= Zbigniew Ziobro =

Polish politician (born 1970)

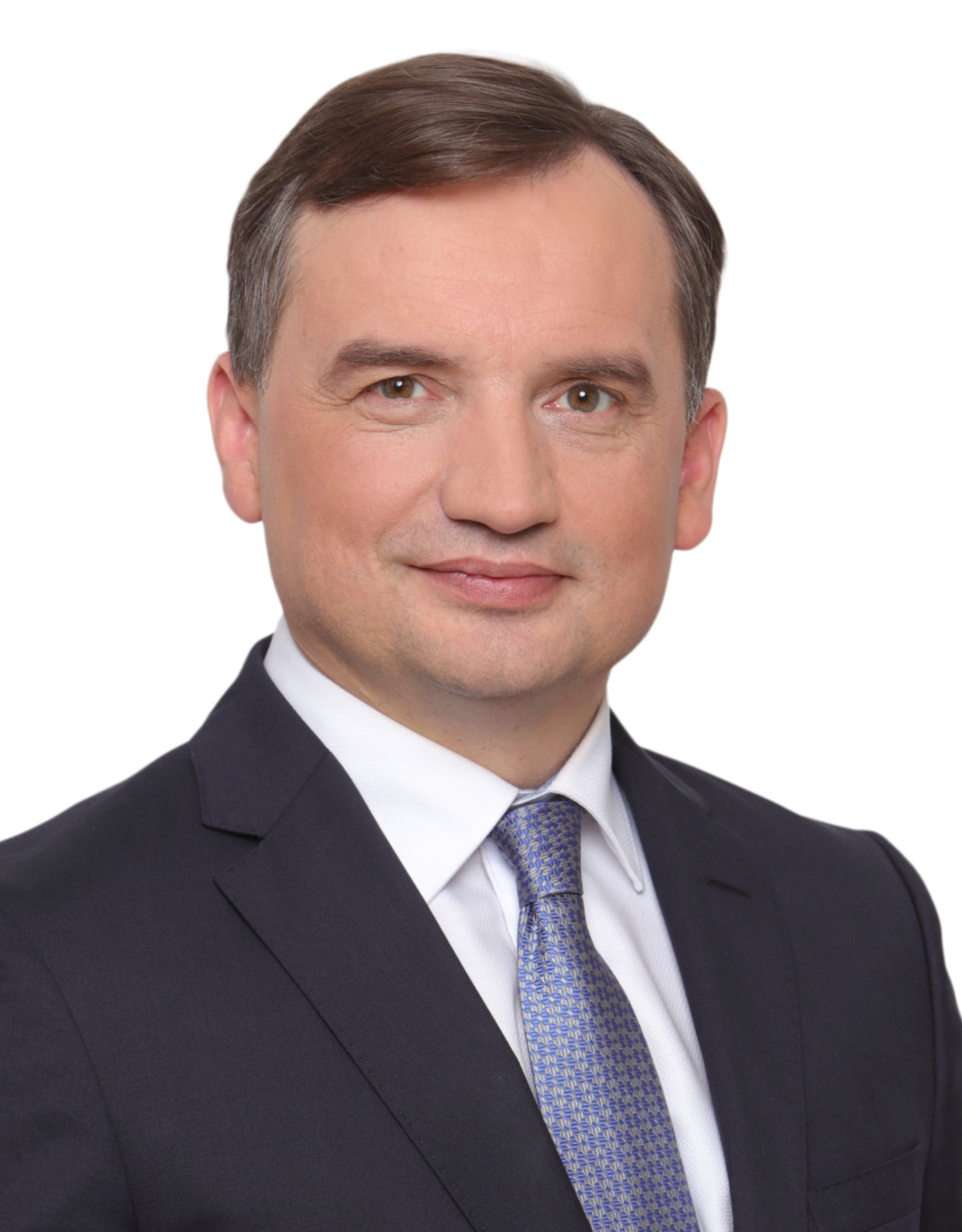
- Ziobro in 2022

Minister of Justice
- In office 16 November 2015 – 27 November 2023
- Prime Minister: Beata Szydło; Mateusz Morawiecki
- Preceded by: Borys Budka
- Succeeded by: Marcin Warchoł

Public Prosecutor General
- In office 4 March 2016 – 27 November 2023
- Preceded by: Andrzej Seremet
- Succeeded by: Marcin Warchoł

Minister of Justice and Public Prosecutor General
- In office 31 October 2005 – 7 September 2007; 11 September – 16 November 2007
- Prime Minister: Kazimierz Marcinkiewicz; Jarosław Kaczyński
- Preceded by: Andrzej Kalwas
- Succeeded by: Zbigniew Ćwiąkalski

Leader of Sovereign Poland
- In office 24 March 2012 – 12 October 2024
- Preceded by: Office established
- Succeeded by: Office abolished

Member of the European Parliament for Lesser Poland and Świętokrzyskie
- In office 14 July 2009 – 30 June 2014

Personal details
- Born: Zbigniew Tadeusz Ziobro; 18 August 1970 (age 56) Kraków, Poland
- Party: Law and Justice (2001–2011; 2024–present)
- Other political affiliations: Sovereign Poland (2012–2024)
- Spouse: Patrycja Kotecka
- Children: 2
- Education: Jagiellonian University
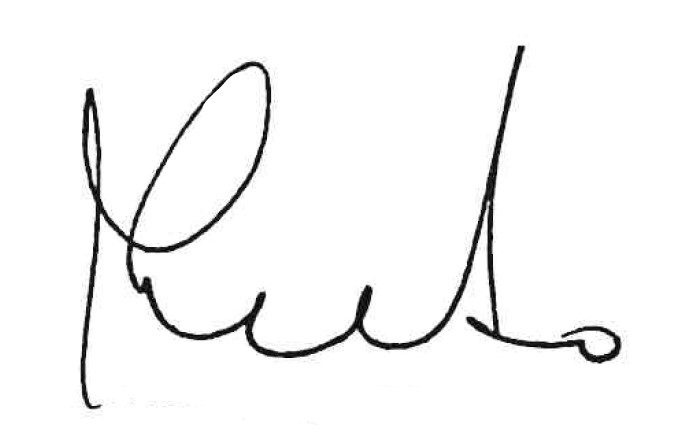
- Signature

Zbigniew Tadeusz Ziobro (Polish: [ˈzbiɡɲɛv ˈʑɔbrɔ]; born 18 August 1970) is a Polish politician and lawyer. He served as minister of justice and public prosecutor general from 2005 to 2007, returned as justice minister in 2015 and again combined the two offices from 2016 until 2023. He has been a member of the Sejm during six parliamentary terms and was a Member of the European Parliament (MEP) from 2009 to 2014. A co-founder of Law and Justice (PiS), he was expelled from the party in 2011 and subsequently founded and led Sovereign Poland, known until 2023 as United Poland. The party merged into PiS in October 2024.

Ziobro rose to national prominence through his anti-corruption rhetoric and his work on the parliamentary inquiry into the Rywin affair. As justice minister, he cultivated a law-and-order image and became one of Poland's most influential and polarising politicians. During his second period in office he was a principal architect of changes to the judiciary and prosecution service that the European Commission, the Court of Justice of the European Union (CJEU), the European Court of Human Rights (ECtHR) and other critics said weakened judicial independence and politicised law enforcement. Ziobro and PiS maintained that the changes increased accountability, removed communist-era structures and improved efficiency.

Since 2025, Polish prosecutors have sought to prosecute Ziobro for 26 alleged offences connected mainly with the management of the Justice Fund, including alleged abuse of office, misappropriation of public funds and directing an organised criminal group. Ziobro denies wrongdoing and describes the proceedings as political retaliation by the government of Donald Tusk. He was granted refugee status by Hungary in January 2026 and travelled to the United States in May. Hungary revoked his status and refugee travel document on 2 July 2026; on the same day, a Warsaw court made an order for his pre-trial detention final. As of July 2026, he remained in the United States.

== Early life and education ==
Ziobro was born on 18 August 1970 in Kraków. He studied law at the Faculty of Law and Administration of Jagiellonian University, graduating with a master's degree, and completed a prosecutorial apprenticeship at the Regional Prosecutor's Office in Katowice. He later began doctoral studies but did not complete a doctorate.

In 2000, justice minister Lech Kaczyński appointed Ziobro secretary of a team preparing amendments to Poland's criminal-law codes. From March to July 2001, he served as an undersecretary of state in the Ministry of Justice.

== Political career ==
=== Entry into parliament and the Rywin inquiry (2001–2005) ===
Ziobro was among the founders of Law and Justice in 2001 and was elected to the Sejm that year. He became nationally prominent as a member of the parliamentary commission investigating the Rywin affair, a corruption scandal involving film producer Lew Rywin and senior figures associated with the governing Democratic Left Alliance. Ziobro prepared a minority report alleging a wider network of political responsibility; the Sejm adopted his report as the commission's final conclusions in September 2004.

In the 2005 parliamentary election, Ziobro was re-elected in the Kraków constituency with 120,188 votes, one of the strongest individual results in the election. He also worked on Lech Kaczyński's successful presidential campaign.

=== First tenure as justice minister and prosecutor general (2005–2007) ===
Ziobro was appointed minister of justice and public prosecutor general on 31 October 2005 in the government of Kazimierz Marcinkiewicz and remained in the posts under Jarosław Kaczyński. His tenure was interrupted from 7 to 11 September 2007, when he was dismissed and then reappointed. He left office on 16 November 2007 after PiS lost its parliamentary majority.

He promoted an aggressive campaign against corruption and organised crime and frequently announced arrests and investigations at press conferences. Supporters credited him with challenging entrenched interests, while critics accused him of using prosecutorial powers for partisan purposes and prejudicing ongoing cases. In 2006, the Polish weekly Wprost named him its Person of the Year.

=== Opposition, European Parliament and Sovereign Poland (2007–2015) ===
Ziobro was re-elected to the Sejm in 2007. In the 2009 European Parliament election in Poland, he won a seat in the Lesser Poland and Świętokrzyskie constituency with 335,933 votes, the second-highest individual total nationally after Jerzy Buzek. In the European Parliament, he sat on the Committee on Legal Affairs and, at different periods, belonged to the European Conservatives and Reformists and Europe of Freedom and Democracy groups.

After PiS's defeat in the 2011 parliamentary election, Ziobro and fellow MEPs Jacek Kurski and Tadeusz Cymański called for changes in the party leadership. PiS expelled them on 4 November 2011. Ziobro's supporters established a parliamentary group and then launched Solidarna Polska (United Poland) on 24 March 2012, with Ziobro as leader. The party failed to win seats in the 2014 European Parliament election. Later that year it entered an electoral alliance with PiS and Poland Together, which became known as the United Right.

=== Justice minister and prosecutor general (2015–2023) ===
Ziobro returned to the Sejm in the 2015 parliamentary election as a candidate on the PiS list and was appointed justice minister in Beata Szydło's government on 16 November 2015. A law adopted in early 2016 reunited the offices of justice minister and prosecutor general; Ziobro became prosecutor general on 4 March 2016. He retained both positions in the governments of Mateusz Morawiecki and was re-elected to the Sejm in 2019 and 2023.

Ziobro oversaw extensive changes to the organisation of courts, judicial appointments, disciplinary proceedings and the prosecution service. He was also responsible for the Justice Fund, which had originally been established primarily to assist crime victims and people leaving prison but was expanded to finance crime-prevention projects and other programmes. His party was renamed Sovereign Poland in May 2023.

In 2020, when the EU blocked funding for Polish towns that declared themselves 'LGBT-free zone.' Ziobro announced that the town of Tuchów in southern Poland would now receive 250,000 zlotys ($67,800) from the ministry's Justice Fund, to compensate for the EU funding reversal for its support for LGBT-free zone.

On 27 November 2023, during the short-lived Third Cabinet of Mateusz Morawiecki, Ziobro was replaced as justice minister and prosecutor general by Marcin Warchoł.

=== Return to Law and Justice (2024–present) ===
Ziobro suspended most political activity in late 2023 after being diagnosed with oesophageal cancer and underwent surgery and chemotherapy, including treatment in Belgium. Sovereign Poland merged with PiS on 12 October 2024, ending Ziobro's twelve-year leadership of the separate party.

== Political views ==
=== Religion and social policy ===
Political scientists Brent F. Nelsen and James L. Guth have described Ziobro as a Catholic integralist whose politics emphasise Poland's Roman Catholic identity and traditional Catholic morality.

Ziobro opposes same-sex marriage and adoption by same-sex couples. In 2020, he said it would be unacceptable for EU institutions to make legalisation of same-sex marriage a condition for Poland to receive EU funds. In March 2021, his ministry proposed legislation intended to prevent people in same-sex relationships from adopting as single parents; Ziobro said the measure defended the traditional family and reflected the views of most Poles.

Ziobro has opposed the Istanbul Convention on preventing and combating violence against women and domestic violence. In July 2020, he announced that his ministry would begin the process of withdrawing Poland from the convention, arguing that it introduced an ideological concept of gender and weakened the significance of biological sex. In 2012, he had called the convention a feminist instrument intended to legitimise what he termed “gay ideology”.

=== European Union and judicial sovereignty ===
Ziobro has supported Poland's membership of the European Union but has taken a strongly sovereigntist and Eurosceptic position on the scope of EU authority. During disputes over the Polish judicial reforms, he accused EU institutions of “blackmail” and said Poland should remain in the EU, but “not at any cost”. In July 2021, after a CJEU order concerning Poland's judicial disciplinary system, he said Poland could not comply with a ruling that, in his view, exceeded powers conferred on the EU.

== Controversies and legal proceedings ==
=== Statements concerning Mirosław Garlicki ===
On 12 February 2007, the Central Anticorruption Bureau arrested cardiac surgeon Mirosław Garlicki on suspicion of corruption and homicide. At a press conference two days later, Ziobro said that “no one will ever again be deprived of life by this man”. Garlicki was not charged with homicide, although he was later convicted of some corruption offences. He sued Ziobro for infringement of his personal rights. In December 2008, the Kraków Court of Appeal upheld a judgment requiring Ziobro to apologise publicly and pay compensation; the Supreme Court declined to hear his cassation appeal in 2009. In a 2011 judgment concerning Garlicki's arrest and detention, the European Court of Human Rights found, among other violations, that Ziobro's public statement had breached Garlicki's right to be presumed innocent.

=== Death of his father and prosecution of doctors ===
Ziobro's father, Jerzy Ziobro, died in 2006 following cardiac treatment at the Jagiellonian University Hospital in Kraków. The family alleged medical negligence. Prosecutors discontinued the investigation in 2008 and again in 2011, but it was reopened after Ziobro returned as justice minister and prosecutor general. Four doctors were acquitted in 2017; further appellate proceedings continued for years. Critics, including judges' and lawyers' organisations, alleged that the prosecution service had devoted exceptional resources to a private case involving the prosecutor general's family and had exerted pressure on the doctors and the trial judge. Ziobro and his family maintained that the proceedings were necessary to establish responsibility for his father's death. In 2022, the ECtHR found no violation of Article 2, concluding that the Polish authorities had investigated the alleged medical negligence with sufficient thoroughness.

=== Andrzej Lepper affair and secret recording ===
In 2007, a failed anti-corruption operation concerning alleged bribery at the Ministry of Agriculture led to the dismissal of deputy prime minister Andrzej Lepper and contributed to the collapse of the governing coalition. Former interior minister Janusz Kaczmarek accused senior officials, particularly Ziobro, of misconduct and political manipulation during the investigation. In the ensuing public dispute, Ziobro disclosed that he had secretly recorded a conversation with Lepper. Lepper accused him of manipulating the recording and of responsibility for the operation.

=== Barbara Blida case and State Tribunal attempt ===
Former construction minister Barbara Blida died by suicide on 25 April 2007 while officers of the Internal Security Agency were attempting to arrest her in a corruption investigation. A parliamentary inquiry established after the change of government concluded in 2011 that the investigation and arrest operation had been politically driven and recommended that Ziobro and Jarosław Kaczyński be brought before the State Tribunal. PiS members issued a dissenting report and argued that the majority's conclusions were politically motivated.

In 2012, MPs from the governing coalition submitted a broader motion to hold Ziobro constitutionally accountable for alleged abuses during his 2005–2007 tenure. In July 2015, the Sejm's Constitutional Accountability Committee found grounds to proceed on six of the eight allegations. On 25 September 2015, 271 deputies voted to refer the case to the State Tribunal, five fewer than the required three-fifths majority of 276, so the motion failed.

=== Disclosure of prosecution files ===
In 2008, the Sejm lifted Ziobro's parliamentary immunity so prosecutors could investigate whether he had unlawfully disclosed confidential files from an investigation into the fuel mafia to Jarosław Kaczyński while serving as prosecutor general. Ziobro said the disclosure had been lawful and related to the prime minister's supervisory responsibilities. The investigation was discontinued in November 2009 for insufficient evidence to establish an offence.

=== Judicial overhaul and conflict with European courts ===
During Ziobro's second tenure, the government changed the rules governing the National Council of the Judiciary, the Supreme Court, court presidents and the disciplinary system for judges. The justice minister received expanded powers to dismiss and appoint presidents and vice-presidents of ordinary courts. Critics said the changes allowed the executive and parliamentary majority to influence judicial careers and punish judges who questioned the reforms; the government argued that the measures increased democratic accountability and efficiency.

The CJEU issued several judgments and interim orders finding aspects of the disciplinary regime incompatible with EU law. The ECtHR likewise found violations arising from the appointment and removal of judges and the composition of newly created chambers. The dispute contributed to the European Commission withholding billions of euros in EU recovery funds from Poland. Ziobro rejected the rulings as an encroachment on national sovereignty and said Poland could not comply with decisions that exceeded EU competences.

=== Judges' smear campaign ===
In August 2019, Onet reported that deputy justice minister Łukasz Piebiak had coordinated with a private individual to circulate personal information and hostile material about judges critical of the government's judicial changes. Piebiak resigned after the disclosures. Messages published by Onet indicated that he referred to reporting his activities to an unnamed “boss”; no evidence published at the time established that Ziobro had personally ordered the campaign. Ziobro accepted Piebiak's resignation and called for the allegations to be investigated.

=== Justice Fund spending ===
The Supreme Audit Office (NIK) repeatedly criticised the management of the Justice Fund under Ziobro. In a 2021 audit, NIK found that large sums had been spent outside the fund's core purpose of assisting crime victims, that grant procedures lacked transparency and equal treatment, and that some spending was uneconomic or ineffective. The Ministry of Justice rejected the central conclusions and argued that the broadened use of the fund was lawful.

A later NIK audit covering 2021–2025 again assessed the fund's operation negatively. It identified, among other issues, backdated or nominal strategic documents, insufficient supervision, grants to entities that did not meet formal requirements and excessive administrative and promotional spending. NIK found that the statutory limit on operating costs had been exceeded by about 967,000 złoty in 2021 and 16.6 million złoty in 2023; it also noted that promotional material featuring Ziobro and other politicians was broadcast before and during the 2023 election campaign.

In March 2024, prosecutors and the Internal Security Agency searched properties belonging to Ziobro and other former officials in an investigation into alleged misuse of the fund. Ziobro, who was then undergoing cancer treatment, denied wrongdoing, while members of Sovereign Poland described the searches as politically motivated.

=== Pegasus purchase and parliamentary inquiry ===
Money from the Justice Fund was used in 2017 to transfer 25 million złoty to the Central Anticorruption Bureau for the purchase of the Pegasus spyware system. Ziobro later acknowledged that he had initiated the purchase and said the software was acquired lawfully to combat serious crime and corruption. The subsequent discovery that Pegasus had been used against opposition politicians, prosecutors and lawyers generated allegations that it had been deployed for political surveillance; Ziobro denied that it was used unlawfully.

A Sejm inquiry summoned Ziobro repeatedly in 2024 and 2025. He disputed the committee's legality and initially cited his cancer treatment in declining to appear. A court authorised his detention and compulsory appearance. On 31 January 2025, police detained him after a television interview and brought him to the Sejm, but the committee ended its sitting before questioning him and sought a custodial penalty for his failure to attend. The detention was therefore an enforcement measure connected with a witness summons, not an arrest on criminal charges relating to Pegasus. He ultimately testified before the committee on 29 September 2025.

=== Criminal case concerning the Justice Fund (2025–present) ===
On 28 October 2025, Prosecutor General Waldemar Żurek asked the Sejm to waive Ziobro's parliamentary immunity and authorise his detention and pre-trial arrest. Prosecutors alleged that, from 2017 to 2023, Ziobro directed an organised criminal group within the Ministry of Justice that manipulated grant competitions, authorised contracts and payments to ineligible organisations, concealed documents and diverted approximately 150 million złoty from the Justice Fund for political or personal benefit. The allegations included the financing of Pegasus and grants or equipment intended to benefit politicians associated with Sovereign Poland. Some alleged offences carry a maximum sentence of 25 years' imprisonment.

On 7 November 2025, the Sejm waived Ziobro's immunity in relation to all 26 alleged offences and authorised his detention and possible pre-trial arrest. Prosecutors issued decisions to present the charges and compel his appearance, but he remained abroad and the decisions could not be served in person. The National Prosecutor's Office said the evidence included testimony from co-suspects and witnesses, documents, recorded conversations and data recovered from electronic devices. Ziobro denied every allegation, said the spending had served the public interest, and accused Tusk's government of seeking revenge for investigations he had conducted while in office.

In November 2025, Poland cancelled Ziobro's diplomatic passport. On 5 February 2026, a Warsaw court ordered three months of pre-trial detention to take effect upon his arrest; the following day, prosecutors issued a national wanted notice. On 2 July 2026, an appellate court upheld the detention order, making it final and allowing prosecutors to prepare an extradition request to the United States. No court had determined Ziobro's guilt as of July 2026.

=== Asylum in Hungary and departure for the United States ===
In January 2026, the government of Hungarian prime minister Viktor Orbán granted Ziobro refugee status. Ziobro said he had accepted protection because he could not receive a fair trial in Poland; the Polish government rejected that claim and described the decision as interference with the operation of an EU member state's justice system.

Ziobro travelled from Milan to New York on 9 May 2026 using a Hungarian-issued refugee travel document and a United States journalist visa. Reuters reported that US Deputy Secretary of State Christopher Landau had instructed officials to facilitate approval of the visa; the State Department and Landau declined to comment. Ziobro said he was working as a correspondent and commentator for the right-wing Polish broadcaster Telewizja Republika. His lawyer said that, at the time of travel, no international arrest warrant or travel ban applied to him.

After a change of government in Hungary, the Hungarian authorities revoked the refugee status and travel documents of Ziobro, his wife Patrycja Kotecka-Ziobro and former deputy justice minister Marcin Romanowski on 2 July 2026. Polish officials said they would seek clarification from the United States about Ziobro's legal status and pursue extradition. Ziobro continued to describe the prosecution as politically motivated.

== Personal life and health ==
Ziobro is married to journalist and former media executive Patrycja Kotecka; they have two sons. He was diagnosed with oesophageal cancer in November 2023 and subsequently underwent several operations and chemotherapy in Poland and Belgium.

== See also ==
- Polish constitutional crisis
- Pegasus
- Marcin Romanowski
