= First Tusk cabinet =

First Cabinet of Donald Tusk
- 15th Cabinet of Poland
- 2007–2011
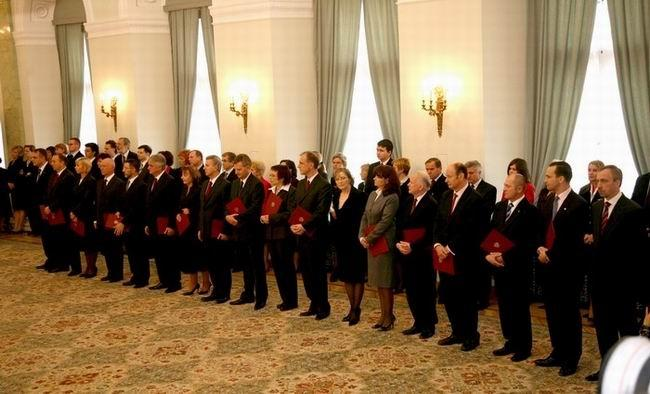
- Ministers pictured after their swearing-in, (2007)
- Date formed: 16 November 2007
- Date dissolved: 18 November 2011

People and organisations
- Head of state: Lech Kaczyński: Bronisław Komorowski (Acting); Bogdan Borusewicz (Acting); Grzegorz Schetyna (Acting); Bronisław Komorowski
- Head of government: Donald Tusk
- Head of government's history: 2007–2014, 2023–present
- Deputy head of government: Waldemar Pawlak (2007-11); Grzegorz Schetyna (2007-9)
- Member parties: Civic Platform Polish People's Party
- Status in legislature: Majority (coalition)
- Opposition party: Law and Justice Left and Democrats
- Opposition leader: Jaroslaw Kaczyński

History
- Election: 2007 Polish parliamentary election
- Predecessor: Kaczyński
- Successor: Tusk II

The first cabinet of Donald Tusk was the government of Poland from 16 November 2007 to 18 November 2011, sitting in the Council of Ministers during the 6th legislature of the Sejm and the 7th legislature of the Senate. It was appointed by President Lech Kaczyński on 16 November 2007 and passed the vote of confidence in Sejm on 24 November 2007. Led by the centre-right politician Donald Tusk it was supported by the coalition of two parties: the liberal conservative Civic Platform (PO) and the agrarian Polish People's Party (PSL).

== The cabinet ==
Civic Platform
Polish People's Party
Independent

Office	Image	Name	Party	From	To
Prime Minister		Donald Tusk	Civic Platform	16 November 2007	18 November 2011
Chairman of the Committee for European Integration		Donald Tusk	Civic Platform	16 November 2007	31 December 2009
Deputy Prime Minister		Waldemar Pawlak	Polish People's Party	16 November 2007	18 november 2011
Minister of Economy		Waldemar Pawlak	Polish People's Party	16 November 2007	18 november 2011
Deputy Prime Minister		Grzegorz Schetyna	Civic Platform	16 November 2007	13 October 2009
Minister of Interior and Administration		Grzegorz Schetyna	Civic Platform	16 November 2007	13 October 2009
Minister of Regional Development		Elżbieta Bieńkowska	Independent	16 November 2007	18 November 2011
Minister of Justice		Zbigniew Ćwiąkalski	Independent	16 November 2007	20 January 2009
Minister of Sport and Tourism		Mirosław Drzewiecki	Civic Platform	16 November 2007	13 October 2009
Minister of Justice		Andrzej Czuma	Civic Platform	23 January 2009	13 October 2009
Minister of Justice		Krzysztof Kwiatkowski	Civic Platform	14 October 2009	18 November 2011
Minister		Zbigniew Derdziuk	Independent	16 November 2007	13 October 2009
Minister of Sport and Tourism		Adam Giersz	Independent	14 October 2009	18 november 2011
Minister of Interior and Administration		Jerzy Miller	Independent	14 October 2009	18 November 2011
Minister		Michał Boni	Independent	15 January 2009	18 November 2011
Ministry Labour and Social Policy		Jolanta Fedak	Polish People's Party	16 November 2007	18 November 2011
Minister of Agriculture and Rural Development		Marek Sawicki	Polish People's Party	16 November 2007	18 November 2011
Minister of National Defence		Bogdan Klich	Civic Platform	16 November 2007	2 August 2011
Minister of Health		Ewa Kopacz	Civic Platform	16 November 2007	7 November 2011
Minister of National Defence		Tomasz Siemoniak	Civic Platform	2 August 2011	18 November 2011
Minister of Foreign Affairs		Radosław Sikorski	Civic Platform	16 November 2007	18 November 2011
Minister of Finance		Jacek Rostowski	Civic Platform	16 November 2007	18 November 2011
Minister of National Education		Katarzyna Hall	Independent	16 November 2007	18 November 2011
Minister of Environment		Maciej Nowicki	Independent	16 November 2007	1 February 2010
Minister of State Treasury		Aleksander Grad	Civic Platform	16 November 2007	18 November 2011
Minister of Environment		Andrzej Kraszewski	Independent	2 February 2010	18 November 2011
Minister of Culture and National Heritage		Bogdan Zdrojewski	Civic Platform	16 November 2007	18 November 2011
Minister of Science and Higher Education		Barbara Kudrycka	Civic Platform	16 November 2007	18 November 2011
Minister of Infrastructure		Cezary Grabarczyk	Civic Platform	16 November 2007	7 November 2011

== Vote of confidence ==
Vote of confidence in the First Cabinet of Donald Tusk
Ballot →	24 November 2007
Required majority →	223 out of 444
Votes in favour: • PO (206); • PSL (31); • Independent (1)	238 / 444
Votes against: • PiS (159); • SLD (45)	204 / 444
Abstentions: • Independent (2)	2 / 444
Absent: • SLD (8); • PiS (5); • PO (3)	16 / 460
