= National Court Register =

Polish official companies register

- Krajowy Rejestr Sądowy
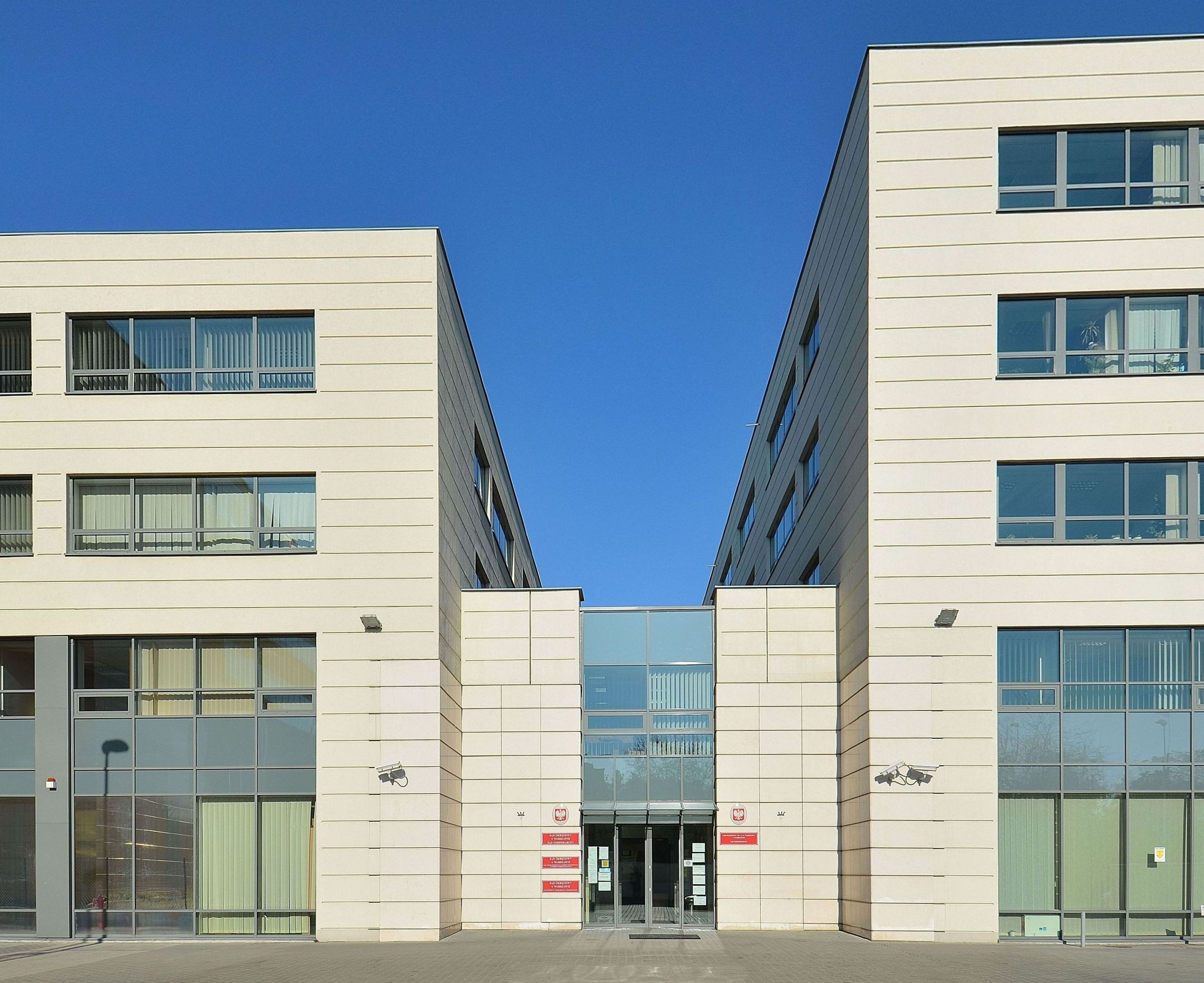
- Headquarters of the KRS in Warsaw

Company register overview
- Formed: 2001; 25 years ago
- Type: Department
- Jurisdiction: Poland
- Headquarters: Warsaw, Poland
- Parent department: Ministry of Justice (Poland) and Polish Courts
- Website: wyszukiwarka-krs.ms.gov.pl

The National Court Register (Polish: Krajowy Rejestr Sądowy [kraˈjɔ.vɨ ˈrɛ.jɛstr sɔnˈdɔ.vɨ], KRS) is the Polish official company register.

Launched in 2001, the KRS is jointly administered by the Ministry of Justice and the regional courts. Most companies and organisations in Poland must register in order to legally conduct their activities, and only companies with a physical presence in Poland may register. Registered companies are afforded certain rights, including protection of their name. In the years following its introduction, the register underwent gradual digitalisation and since 2021 is only available electronically.

The KRS operates through an IT system that enables the collection, verification, processing and exchange of data important for ensuring the order and security of legal transactions. The task of the National Court Register is to provide public access to fast and reliable information on the legal status of a registered person (KRS central information), the most important elements of its financial status and the way it is presented.

== History ==
Proposals by the Ministry of Justice outlining the creation of a national business register passed into law in the Sejm on 20 August 1997. It was designed to replace the previous system of 12 separate directories, which had been in place since 1934, and to make the information contained within more accessible both to businesses and the public.

The new National Court Register (NCR) came into force on 1 January 2001 and comprises three main parts:

- the business register,
- the associations register, other social and professional organisations, foundations and public healthcare institutions,
- the register of insolvent debtors (replaced by the National Register of Debtors on 1 December 2021).

These contain data such as the names and addresses of the company and its board members, any articles of association, financial returns and information around insolvency proceedings.

Certain types of business, including investment firms and pension providers, are exempt from registration.

Companies incorporated before 2001 had to re-register on the NCR in order to continue trading legally.

== Legal rights ==
Once a business is registered it acquires the status of a legal entity and is able to carry out business lawfully. All new entries on the NCR are published in an accompanying journal called the Court Monitor (Polish: Monitor Sądowy i Gospodarczy), which is published every weekday. Registered companies enjoy certain protections under Polish law; no new company may use the same name as an existing registered company in the same town or city, and companies can also prevent others from using their trading name if different from the registered name.

Under Article 23 of the National Court Register Act, the registry court carries out substantive checks on the application for entry in the Register and on the accompanying documents. The court also verifies the accuracy of the entity’s identification data (name and surname, PESEL, the entity’s name or company, REGON and the KRS number); the court also verifies other data in the application if it has reasonable doubt as to their veracity.

Only companies based in Poland are allowed to register on the NCR. International companies must therefore open an office in the country before registering, which can only be registered if the Polish company is involved in similar business activities to its parent. In the case of a merger or acquisition, the newly formed company must re-register and any old records must be removed.

== Functions of the register ==
The KRS has two main functions: informational and legalisation. The informational function is that the KRS constitutes a nationwide database of entities participating in economic transactions. The legalisation function consists in the fact that only an entry in the register allows further legal actions to be performed (this is often tantamount to obtaining legal personality).

In order to ensure the veracity of the data contained in the register, as well as its completeness, the National Court Register Act contains a presumption of the veracity of entries in the register. However, in the event of the discovery of a discrepancy between the facts and the registration record, legal remedies are placed at the disposal of the registration court to restore the state of affairs in accordance with the applicable regulations. These remedies are designed to protect the fundamental constitutional principles contained in the National Court Register Act.

The KRS is open to the public in terms of form - everyone has the right to familiarise themselves with the data entered in the register, to obtain a copy, extract or certificate concerning the data contained in the register. Everyone has the right to review the registration files of entities subject to entry in the Register of Entrepreneurs at the seat of the registration court (in the file reading rooms located in the buildings of the district courts where the commercial divisions of the NCR are located). It is not necessary to demonstrate any legal or factual interest to view the files. Copies and excerpts can be downloaded from the offices of the Central Information Office of the National Court Register or on the Internet.

Since 2013, automatic data exchange between the National Court Register and the National Criminal Register (KRK) has been possible, thanks to which registration courts can verify on an ongoing basis whether a person enrolled in the NCR has been convicted of one of the offences that prevents him/her from being entered in the register.

== Digitalisation and the NCR Central Information Office ==
The Central Information of the National Court Register is an organisational unit of the Ministry of Justice consisting of the central office and branches operating at registration courts. The main task of the Central Information is to maintain a collection of information entered in the register and to provide information from the National Court Register.

With the help of the CIO, the NCR has incorporated digital elements from its implementation. For the time being, a publicly-accessible search engine allowed users to locate up-to-date documents and records on the register by entering the entity's number in the registry (KRS number), tax identification number (NIP), REGON identification number or the name of the entity. Computer printouts of information on entities entered in the NCR, downloaded independently, have the same force as documents issued by the Central Information if they have features enabling their verification with data contained in the NCR.

Work to combine the NCR with data from municipality-level business records into a computerised system began in 2007. A comprehensive programme of digitalisation was carried out between 2012 and 2015 at a cost of just under 1.5 million złoty. Following this, all actions within the register were available electronically, including the downloading of PDF documents, which were granted the same legal status as ones obtained from the CIO.

Since 1 July 2021, the NCR has been completely electronic. Paper applications are no longer accepted and documents may only be obtained via the online system rather than from the CIO. Before this change, only around 10 percent of submissions were made online.

== Regulator of non-profit organisations ==
Citizens in Poland have the right to freely establish and operate various types of organisations, including trade unions, socio-occupational organizations of farmers, societies, citizens' movements, other voluntary associations and foundations.

There are two main types of non-profit organisations in Poland: associations and foundations. Both are regulated by special laws and have rather different registration procedures. Application forms for registering a legal entity and entering it in the

National Court Register can be found on the website of the Ministry of Justice or by logging in to the personal account of the Court Register Portal.

=== Associations ===
The Law on Associations, regulating the functioning of associations in Poland, defines an association as a self-governing, lasting organisation established at its own will and with non-commercial motives. Associations are membership-based, and no one can be forced to join or remain in an association. Members are not required to unconditionally obey association authorities.

To register an association, the founders must first establish a founding committee and prepare a statute of the association containing a list of the founders, their details and addresses. Along with the set of documents, the relevant registration form must also be completed and submitted to the regional registration court.

A "union of associations" may also be established by a minimum of three associations; other legal entities may also act as founders. Unions of associations are subject to the same rules as other associations.

An association is free to define its purposes, operational program, and organizational structure, and to pass internal resolutions about its operations. It is limited in its purposes and activities only by other laws intended to ensure national security, public order, protection of public health and morals, and the protection of rights and freedom of others.

An association may conduct economic activities. For that purpose, it must be registered with the court register of business entities before undertaking economic activities. In theory, an association could be formed primarily for economic purposes, though excessive economic activity would render it ineligible to become a PBO.

There are no restrictions on the political activities of associations. The opportunity to freely participate in public discourse is granted regardless of the objectives stated in the statute.

=== Foundations ===
Foundations in Poland are governed by the Law on Foundations. Foundation is a non-membership organization established by a founder that pursues economically and socially beneficial objectives subject to the essential interest of the Republic of Poland.

The process of establishing a foundation begins with the signing of the establishment act, an official notarised statement by the founder(s), which states the establishment, purpose and initial capital of the foundation. However, most Polish foundations are operational, which means that they do not possess significant capital and must fundraise, and thus are often competing with associations for funds. A statute describing the organisation and activities of the foundation is drawn up. A board of directors is appointed to manage the foundation. The final step is to submit a package of documents, including an application for registration, to the National Court Register.

A foundation may be formed only for economically and socially beneficial purposes, which include but are not limited to the following: health care, development in economy and science, education, culture and fine arts, welfare, environmental protection, and protection of historical monuments.

A foundation may carry out economic activities to achieve its statutory objectives if this is stipulated in its statute. For this purpose, the foundation must also register with the court register of business entities.

Although no explicit regulations prohibit foundations from engaging in political activities, foundations are only permitted to engage in those activities specified in their governing documents.

=== Public Benefit Organisations ===
Non-governmental organisations, including associations and foundations, are eligible to obtain the status of public benefit organisations under the Law on Public Benefit Activity and Volunteerism. This status grants them certain privileges and obligations aimed at promoting public benefit activities.

In order to obtain PBO status, an organisation must, among other things, carry out public benefit activities for at least two years, distribute all profits for statutory purposes and include in its statute a prohibition on granting loans, providing and using assets for the benefit of members, and purchasing goods at prices above market prices.

PBO status exempts the organisation from certain taxes, including VAT, income tax, real estate tax, and others, but only in relation to their socially useful activities. PBOs are eligible to receive a 1% personal tax deduction from taxpayers. They also enjoy access to free media time in the public media to inform about their activities and can use state or local real estate on privileged terms.

In order to obtain the PBO status, an organisation submits to the registration court a relevant application with attachments in which it confirms that it meets the requirements. An organisation becomes a public benefit organisation at the moment when the information that it has been granted this status is entered into the National Court Register.

PBOs are required to prepare and publish basic and financial reports, including information on the use of funds from the 1% personal tax donation. They are subject to internal and external oversight to ensure transparency and proper use of funds. The list of PBOs, as well as all of their financial reports, is publicly available and can be freely searched in the register on the website of the National Institute of Freedom.

== Entrepreneurial activities for foreign citizens ==
Foreign citizens from Member States of the European Union, Member States of the European Free Trade Association (EFTA) - parties to the Agreement on the European Economic Area and foreign citizens from countries that are not parties to the Agreement on the European Economic Area, who may exercise the freedom of establishment on the basis of agreements concluded by those countries with the European Community and its Member States, may undertake and pursue entrepreneurial activity in the territory of the Republic of Poland on the same principles as Polish citizens.

Citizens of other states who have obtained, inter alia, a permit to settle in the territory of the Republic of Poland, a permit for tolerated stay, refugee status granted in the Republic of Poland or who enjoy temporary protection in the territory of the Republic of Poland, may also take up and pursue economic activity in the territory of the Republic of Poland in accordance with the same principles as Polish citizens.

Other foreign persons have the right to undertake and perform economic activity only in the form of limited partnerships, limited joint-stock partnerships, limited liability companies and joint-stock companies, as well as to join such companies, acquire their shares and stocks, unless international agreements provide otherwise.
