= National Criminal Register (Poland) =

Polish database of criminal convictions

National Criminal Register (Polish: Krajowy Rejestr Karny) is an official database of criminal convictions and other law enforcement data maintained by the Polish Ministry of Justice.

== History and legal basis ==
The National Criminal Register was established on 22 June 2001 by the Act of 24 May 2000 on National Criminal Register and replaced the previously existing Central Register of Convicts (Polish: Centralny Rejestr Skazanych) and Central Register of Juvenile Offenders (Polish: Centralny Rejestr Nieletnich).

In early 2022, the Ministry of Justice announced a bill to reform the National Criminal Register by allowing some official notices and documents to be shared between authorities by digital means, and hence improving its reliability and currentness. Moreover, the information in the Register is to be linked to the PESEL Register. The proposed changes are aimed at creating a new computer system labelled "KRK 2.0".

== Data processed and stored ==
The following information is stored in the National Criminal Register:

- data about convictions for criminal offences and tax offences,
- data about persons who received a conditional discharge for a criminal offence or a tax offence,
- data about persons who received a conditional discharge for a criminal offence or a tax offence under amnesty schemes,
- data about Polish citizens convicted by foreign courts,
- data about persons who are subject to court-imposed preventive measures (bail) in cases of criminal or tax offences,
- data about juvenile offenders who were subject to court-imposed educational, corrective or educational-medical measures or were punished under the article 13 or the article 19 of the Act of 26 October 1982 on the procedure for juvenile offenders,
- data about persons who were convicted for a petty (minor) offence and were given a punishment of imprisonment for that offence,
- data about persons who are wanted on an outstanding arrest warrant,
- data about persons who are detained pending trial,
- data about juvenile offenders detained in a juvenile shelter.

Data regarding fixed penalty notices (Polish: mandat karny) issued and convictions for petty (minor) offences, like traffic violations, are not stored in the Register, unless a custodial sentence was imposed.

=== Accessing data ===
The Register is not public. Access to data is limited to authorities (Policja, prosecutor offices (Polish: prokuratura), courts, Foreign Intelligence Agency, Internal Security Agency, Border Guard, Central Anticorruption Bureau, State Protection Service, Military Counterintelligence Service, Military Intelligence Service), data subjects, and, in limited cases, data subjects' employers (when a statue requires an employee to have no criminal record).

As of 2019, data in the Register are accessed as often as 3 million times a year, with 80 per cent of all access requests coming from relevant state authorities.

=== Removal of data ===
Data about convictions are automatically removed when they are considered "spent" under the Polish criminal law. Information about conditional discharges is removed if no further offence is committed within a stated probation period, or when the criminal proceedings resume following breach of the conditions of the discharge. Data about court-imposed preventive measures are removed once they expire. Information is also removed on the event of data subject's death.
