= Marcin Romanowski =

Polish former official

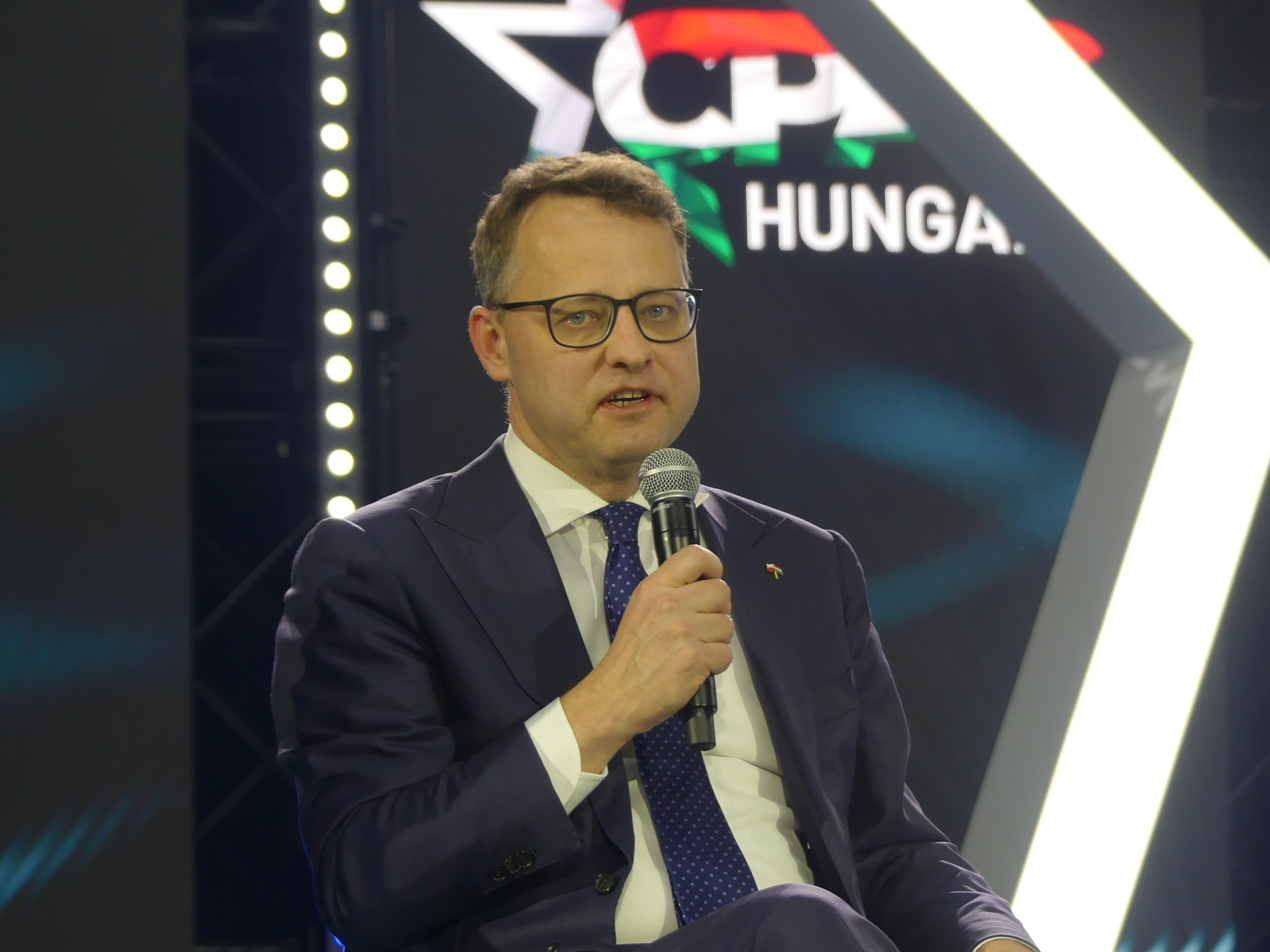
- Romanowski at a CPAC Hungary event, 2025

Personal details
- Born: 20 January 1976 (age 50)
- Party: Prawo i Sprawiedliwość
- Education: Nicolaus Copernicus University in Toruń; University of Regensburg

Marcin Romanowski (born 20 January 1976) is an internationally fugitive Polish politician.

== Life ==
Romanowski graduated from the Faculty of Law and Administration of Nicolaus Copernicus University in 2000, later studying at the University of Regensburg. Romanowski serves as a numerary of the conservative Catholic group Opus Dei.

He was a deputy Minister of Justice of the Republic of Poland in the Second and Third Cabinet of Mateusz Morawiecki. He was elected as a member of the Sejm on 15 October 2023 from the Law and Justice list. From January 2024, he was deputy representative of the Sejm in the Parliamentary Assembly of the Council of Europe.

Following a change of the Polish government in the 2023 Polish parliamentary election, 11 corruption charges were levelled against Romanowski, including defrauding, or attempting to defraud, $40m from a justice fund meant to help crime victims. After he continued to evade being detained by the authorities for a week, a European Arrest Warrant (EAW) was issued by the Polish judiciary on 19 December 2024. Opus Dei denied having him hidden on their properties. The Dominican monastery in Lublin was searched by the police, but it did not result in his capture. A wish to obtain a detailed explanation regarding its disturbance was later published by the order.

On the next day it was announced by the Hungarian government of Viktor Orbán that, in spite of the EAW, Romanowski had received asylum in his country. Polish-Hungarian relations noticeably worsened further, following the change of the ruling party in Warsaw. As a result, the Polish Foreign Ministry recalled its ambassador to Hungary for consultations. On the same day, the Hungarian ambassador to Warsaw was summoned to present him with a protest note.

Following the end of Orbán's premiership in the 2026 election, Romanowski fled Hungary. In August of that year he was reported to be residing in Transnistria, and was publicly put under suspicion of being an MGB, GRU, and FSB asset by the Ministry of National Defence and the Central Anticorruption Bureau.

== See also ==
- Nikola Gruevski, former Prime Minister of Macedonia given asylum in Hungary in 2018
- Zbigniew Ziobro, Polish politician given asylum in Hungary in 2026
