= Kalwas (disambiguation) =

Kalwas is a village in India.

Kalwas may also refer to:

- Andrzej Kalwas, Polish lawyer and politician
- Piotr Ibrahim Kalwas, Polish writer and journalist
