= Krzysztof Kwiatkowski =

Polish lawyer and politician

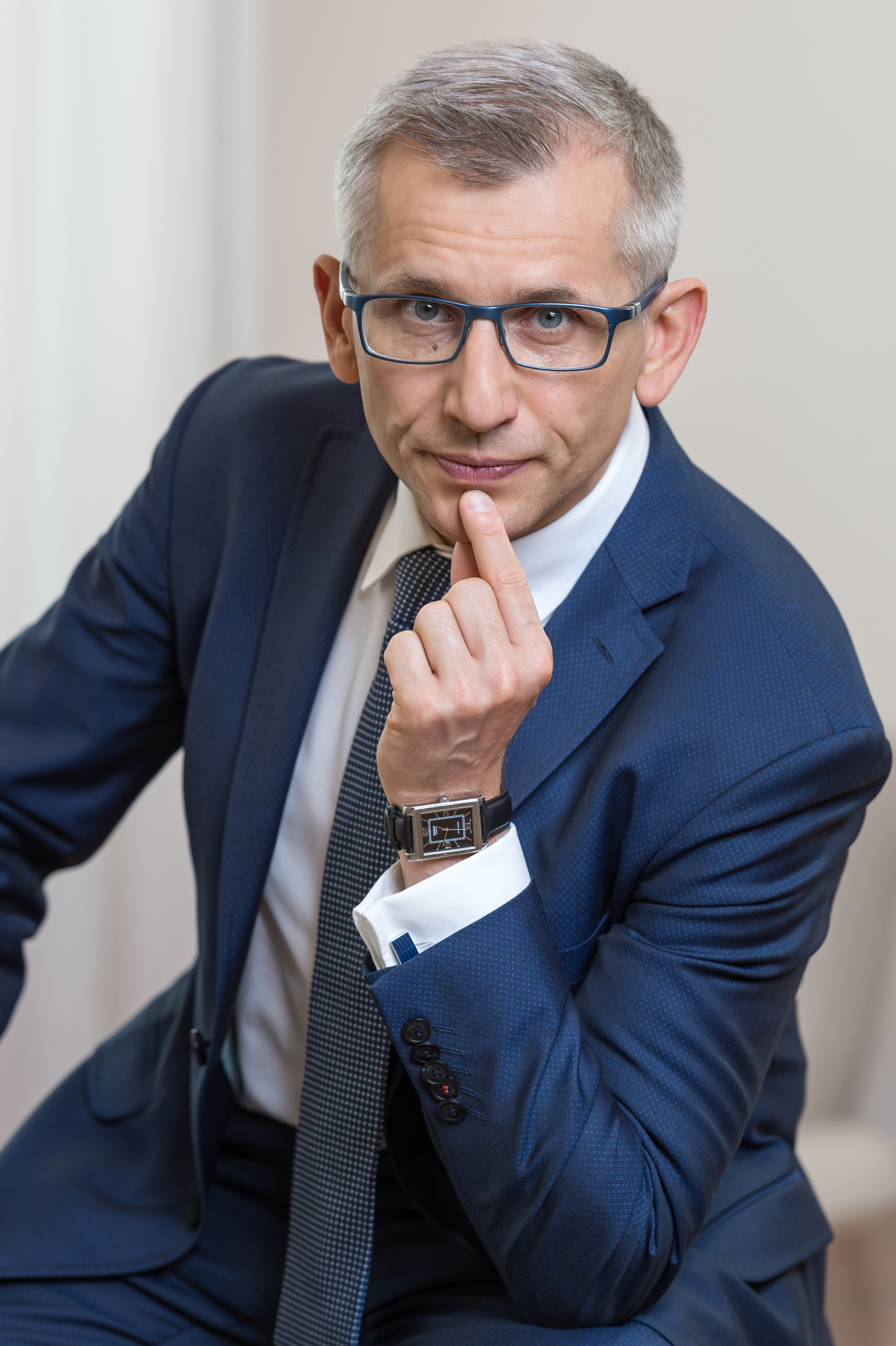
- Kwiatkowski in 2018

6th President of the Supreme Audit Office
- In office 27 August 2013 – 30 August 2019
- President: Bronisław Komorowski; Andrzej Duda
- Prime Minister: Donald Tusk; Ewa Kopacz; Beata Szydło; Mateusz Morawiecki
- Vice President: Wojciech Misiąg; Marian Cichosz; Wojciech Kutyła; Jacek Uczkiewicz; Mieczysław Łuczak; Ewa Polkowska
- Preceded by: Jacek Jezierski
- Succeeded by: Marian Banaś

Minister of Justice
- In office 14 October 2009 – 18 November 2011
- President: Lech Kaczyński; Bronisław Komorowski (Acting); Bogdan Borusewicz (Acting); Grzegorz Schetyna (Acting); Bronisław Komorowski
- Prime Minister: Donald Tusk
- Preceded by: Andrzej Czuma
- Succeeded by: Jarosław Gowin

Public Prosecutor General
- In office 14 October 2009 – 31 March 2010
- National: Edward Zalewski
- Chief Military: Krzysztof Parulski
- Preceded by: Andrzej Czuma
- Succeeded by: Andrzej Seremet

Member of the Senate
- Incumbent
- Assumed office 12 November 2019
- Constituency: 24 — Łódź
- In office 5 November 2007 – 8 November 2011
- Constituency: 24 — Łódź

Member of the Sejm
- In office 8 November 2011 – 9 August 2013
- Constituency: 9 — Łódź

Personal details
- Born: Krzysztof Kwiatkowski; 14 May 1971 (age 55) Zgierz, Poland
- Party: Solidarity Electoral Action (1997-2001); Civic Platform (2004–2013); Independent (2013–2019); Independent Senators Circle (2019–2024); Civic Platform (2024–present)
- Education: University of Warsaw
- Awards: Order of Merit of Hungary Order

Krzysztof Kwiatkowski (born 14 May 1971, in Zgierz) is a Polish lawyer, politician and government official who served as the Minister of Justice of Poland in Cabinet of Donald Tusk from 2009 until 2011, Public Prosecutor General from 2009 until 2010, and as President of the Supreme Audit Office (NIK) from 2013 until 2019. He was also a member of Senate (from Civic Platform) from 2007 until 2011.

Krzysztof Kwiatkowski at the age of 17 joined the Federation of Fighting Youth. He began his studies at the Faculty of Law and Administration at the University of Łódź. His education was interrupted due to cancer. Kwiatkowski graduated with the Master of Law and Administration degree at Warsaw University. He had been actively participating at Independent Students’ Association as a member of the national board.

From 1997 until 2001 he held the position of the personal secretary of the Prime Minister of Poland, Jerzy Buzek. From 2004 until 2013 he was a member of Civic Platform. Kwiatkowski was also a national board member of Polish Paralympic Committee.

On 14 October 2009 he had been appointed by the president Lech Kaczyński for the position of the Minister of Justice and the Public Prosecutor General in the first Cabinet of Donald Tusk. On 11 April 2011 he became a member of Parliamentary Committee for the investigation of the Tu-154M crash in Smolensk after the Smolensk air disaster which occurred on 10 April 2010.

During parliamentary elections in 2011 Kwiatkowski was a candidate of Civic Platform to Sejm. He gained the mandate after reaching 68 814 votes.

On 26 July 2013 he was appointed by Sejm for the position of the President of the Supreme Audit Office. In the same month he resigned from his membership in Civic Platform. On 19 August 2019 he handed his resignation from the position due to the participation in parliamentary elections in the same year. Officially, his term of office ended on 30 August 2019.
