= Piwnik =

Piwnik is a Polish surname. Notable people with the surname include:

- Barbara Piwnik (born 1955), Polish politician
- Jan Piwnik (1912–1944), Polish resistance fighter
