= Hanna Suchocka =

Prime Minister of Poland from 1992 to 1993

The Honourable Hanna Suchocka OB GCPO
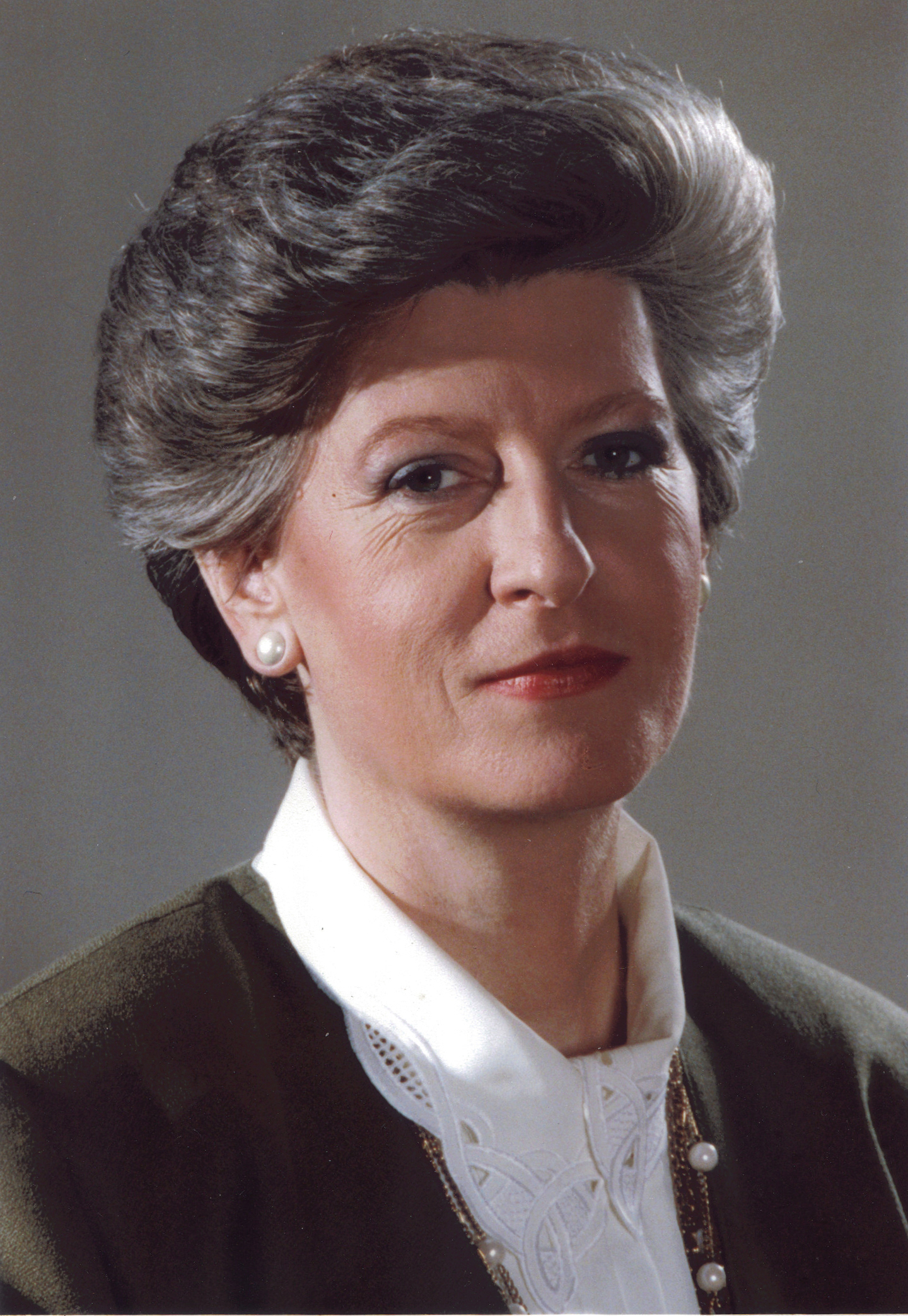
- Official portrait, 1992

Prime Minister of Poland
- In office 8 July 1992 – 26 October 1993
- President: Lech Wałęsa
- Deputy: Henryk Goryszewski; Paweł Łączkowski
- Preceded by: Waldemar Pawlak
- Succeeded by: Waldemar Pawlak

Minister of Justice Public Prosecutor General
- In office 31 October 1997 – 8 June 2000
- Prime Minister: Jerzy Buzek
- Preceded by: Leszek Kubicki
- Succeeded by: Lech Kaczyński

Member of the Sejm
- In office 18 June 1989 – 18 October 2001
- In office 23 March 1980 – 31 July 1985

Personal details
- Born: 3 April 1946 (age 80) Pleszew, Poland
- Party: Alliance of Democrats (before 1989); Solidarity (1989–1990); Democratic Union (1990–1994); Freedom Union (1994–2000)
- Education: Adam Mickiewicz University; M.Jur. (1968), PhD (1975), Habilitation (2015)
- Occupation: Legal scholar, diplomat
- Awards: Order of the White Eagle (Poland) Order of Pius IX
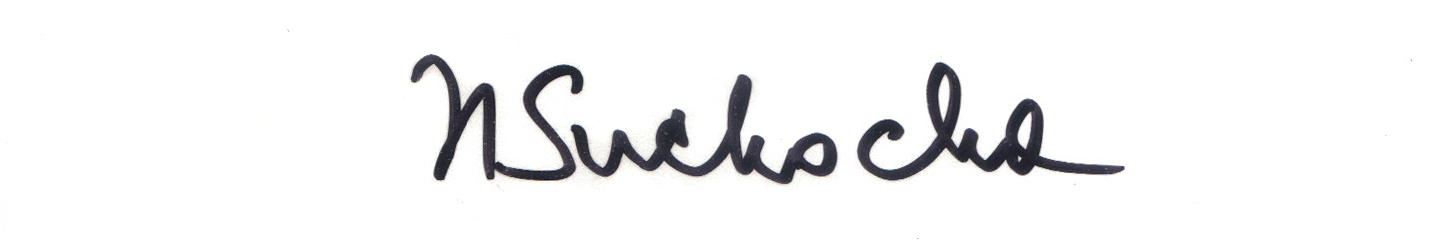
- Signature

Hanna Stanisława Suchocka (pronounced [ˈxanna suˈxɔt͡ska]; born 3 April 1946) is a Polish politician and lawyer who served as Prime Minister of Poland from 8 July 1992 to 26 October 1993 during the presidency of Lech Wałęsa. She is the first woman to hold this post in Poland (preceding Ewa Kopacz and Beata Szydło who both held the post in the 2010s) and was the 14th woman to be appointed and serve as prime minister in the world.

Suchocka currently serves as a professor at Adam Mickiewicz University in Poznań and Chair of the Constitutional Law Department. She is also a former First Vice-President and Honorary President of the Venice Commission.

== Early life ==
Suchocka was born in Pleszew, Poland, in a Catholic family of chemists. Her grandfather was a university teacher and her grandmother Anna became a member of the first Polish parliament for Poznań after independence in 1918 when women got the right to vote. Suchocka went to law school and became a researcher at the University of Poznań (UAM), gaining a PhD in Constitutional Law. Later she worked as a reader in law at Lublin university and for most of her professional life at a facility of the Polish academy of sciences in Poznań until 2013. She gained a habilitation at UAM in 2015.

== Political career ==
In 1969, she joined a small non-Marxist 'satellite party', the Democratic Party (SD), and was a member of parliament the Sejm of People's Republic of Poland in 1980–1985. At the same time, she was a member and a legal advisor to Solidarity. She was one of only a few MPs who did not to vote in favour of martial law in 1981 and the criminalisation of Solidarity in 1984. The party suspended her (or she resigned), but with the support of Solidarity, she was re-elected to parliament in 1989. When Solidarity supporters split up into several political parties, Suchocka joined the centre-liberal Democratic Union (DU) and was re-elected to parliament in 1991.

== Prime Minister of Poland (1992–1993) ==
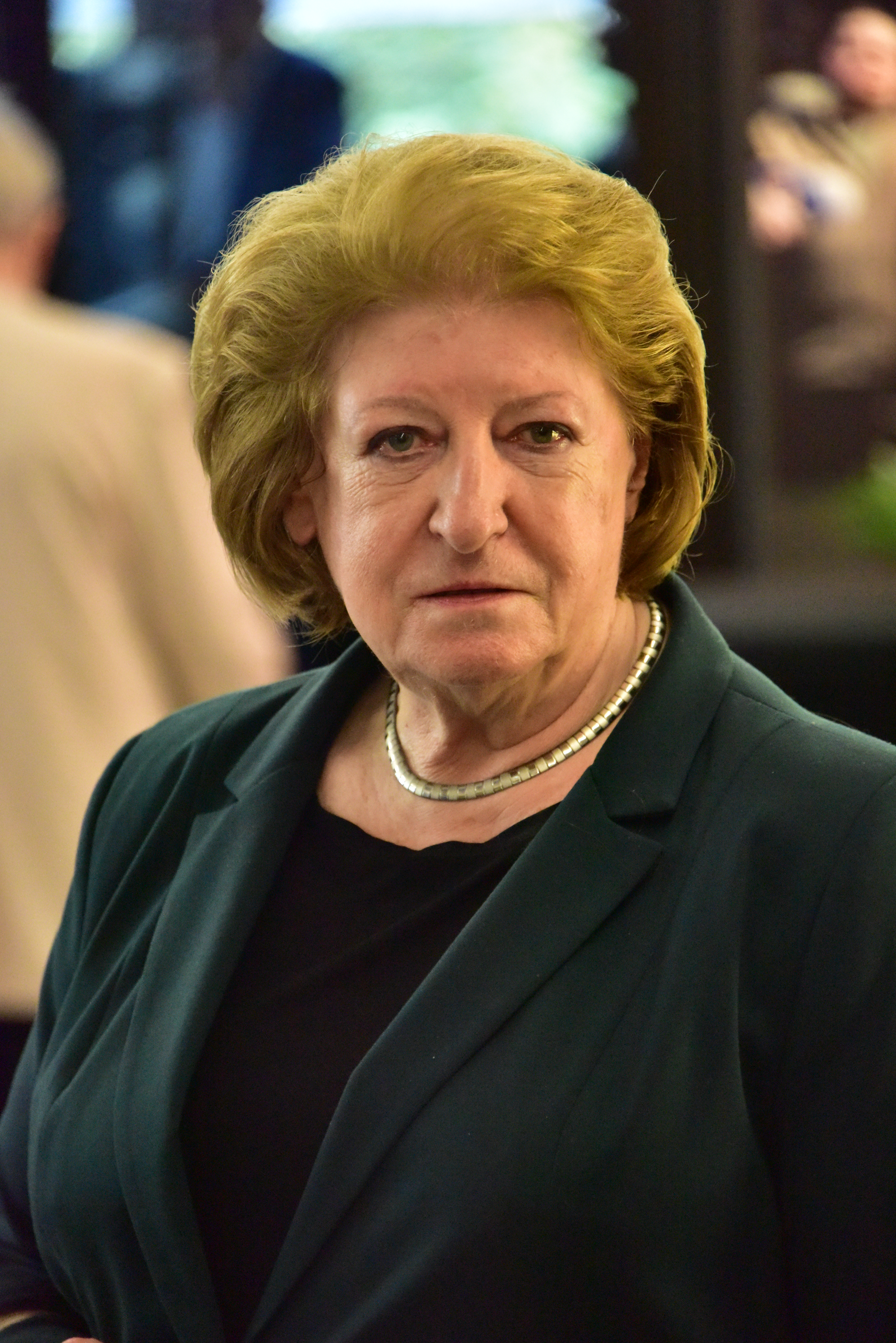
Suchocka in 2024

Suchocka became prime minister in 1992. Governments at the time were based on various coalitions and changed constantly. She was chosen to the amazement of many male politicians but she was known for her low profile and willingness to make compromises and promote reconciliation. She could be accepted by people who had an antipathy towards more prominent leaders of DU. In addition, as a liberal, while being opposed to abortion as a Catholic, she could be accepted by both sides of the political spectrum and satisfy the interests of a majority in a parliament consisting of seven parties, including a Christian and a liberal party.

Suchocka declared that her government was for social reconciliation and would lead the country forward in the transformation from communism to capitalism. She was approved by 233 against 61 votes and 113 abstentions She quickly formed a cabinet, but it didn't include any other female ministers, although she wanted them. None of the coalition partners was willing to accept another woman and she got two male deputy prime ministers. She stayed longer as prime minister than any of her four predecessors, but she did not stay long. There was a wave of strikes and Suchocka was a warm supporter of market reforms and followed a hard line against the strikers. When she wouldn't give salary increases to teachers and health workers, parliament passed a vote of no-confidence by a majority of one vote. Wałęsa dissolved parliament and held new elections. Before the early 1993 parliamentary elections, Suchocka's government signed a concordat with the Holy See, which was the object of charges of the successful Democratic Left Alliance, which criticized the fact that the concordat had signed a cabinet without a parliamentary mandate. Suchocka resigned as soon as the new parliament was in place.

== Later career ==
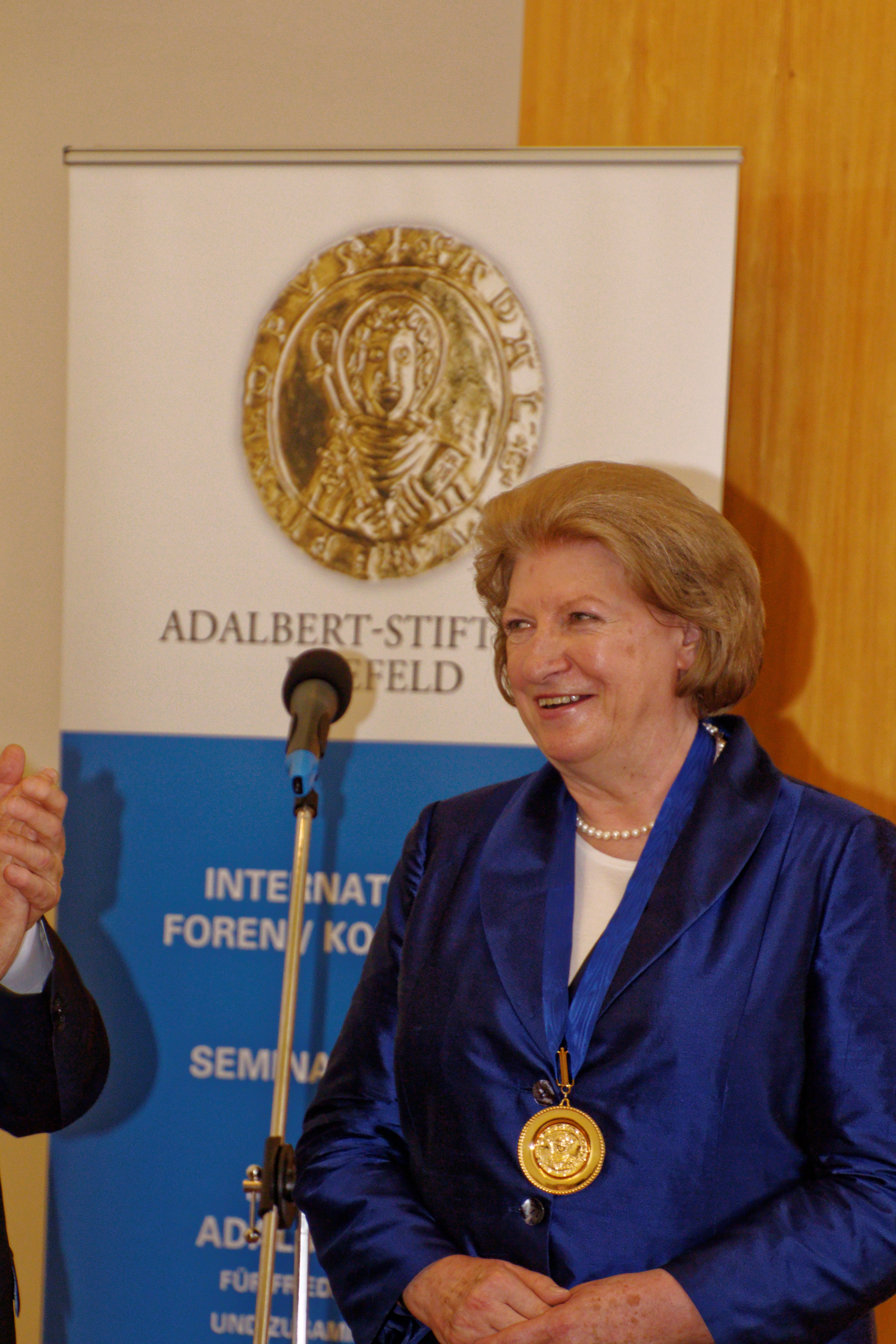
Suchocka in 2015

In 1994, Suchocka was one of the founders of a liberal and social-democratic Liberty Union party, which became the country's third-largest political force. From 1997 to 2000 she was the minister of justice in a coalition government. Suchocka's candidacy stirred controversy amongst some of the activists who co-founded the Solidarity Electoral Action (AWS) and Centre Agreement (PC). In August 1997, former Interior Minister Zbigniew Siemiątkowski accused Suchocka's government of allowing alleged surveillance of opposition political parties. On 8 June 2000, the entire Freedom Union (UW) left the coalition after weeks of negotiations failed to find an acceptable replacement for Jerzy Buzek (whom the Freedom Union accused of failing to push through economic reforms).

She is also a member of the Club of Madrid.

Suchocka is a member of the Council of Women World Leaders, an international network of current and former women presidents and prime ministers whose mission is to mobilize the highest-level women leaders globally for collective action on issues of critical importance to women and equitable development.

She served as Poland's Ambassador to the Holy See from 2002 to 2013. She was also a member of the Pontifical Academy of Social Sciences in the Vatican (appointed by Pope John Paul II on 19 January 1994).

In April 2014 Suchocka was among the eight initial appointees of Pope Francis to the Pontifical Commission for the Protection of Minors.

Political offices
Preceded by Waldemar Pawlak	Prime Minister of Poland; 1992–1993	Succeeded by Waldemar Pawlak
Preceded by Leszek Kubicki	Minister of Justice; 1997–2000	Succeeded by Lech Kaczyński
Diplomatic posts
Preceded by Stefan Frankiewicz	Polish Ambassador to the Holy See; 2001–2013	Succeeded by Piotr Nowina-Konopka
Preceded by Stefan Frankiewicz	Polish Ambassador to the Sovereign Military Order of Malta; 2002–2013	Succeeded by Piotr Nowina-Konopka
