= Andrzej Czuma =

Polish politician, lawyer and historian

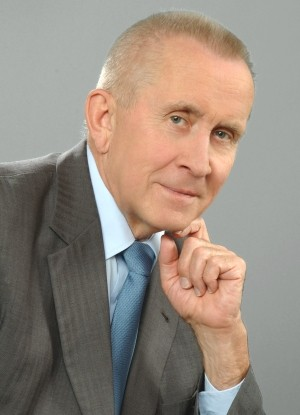

Minister of Justice
- In office 23 January 2009 – 7 October 2009
- Preceded by: Zbigniew Ćwiąkalski
- Succeeded by: Krzysztof Kwiatkowski

Member of the Sejm
- In office 12 December 2006 – 7 November 2011
- Constituency: 19 – Warsaw I

Personal details
- Party: Civic Platform
- Awards: Order of Polonia Restituta; Cross of Freedom and Solidarity
- Website: http://www.czuma.pl/

Andrzej Bobola Czuma [ˈandʐɛj ˈt͡ʂuma] (born 7 December 1938 in Lublin) is a Polish politician, lawyer and historian. He was an activist of the Polish anti-Communist opposition in the Polish People's Republic and was oppressed and imprisoned by the Communist authorities. In the 1980s he left for the USA where he became an activist in the community of Polish expats. Since 2006, Czuma has been a member of the Polish Parliament as a representative of the Civic Platform political party.

He studied law at Warsaw University. He was one of the founders of Ruch - an anti-Communist organisation aiming at making Poland a democratic country and was imprisoned by the Communist authorities. In June 1970, he was sentenced to 7 years' imprisonment for "an attempt to overthrow the Communist government by force". He was a spokesperson for and one of the leaders of the Movement for Defence of Human and Civic Rights (Polish: Ruch Obrony Praw Człowieka i Obywatela, ROPCiO) as well as an editor of Opinia magazine. He was sentenced to 3 months' imprisonment in March 1980 for organising a celebration of Independence Day in front of the Tomb of the Unknown Soldier in Warsaw on 11 November 1979. After the nationwide anti-Communist protests in August 1980 he became an advisor to the Solidarity movement in Silesia region as well as the publisher and editor of Wiadomości Katowickie magazine. He was imprisoned from 12 December 1981 to 23 December 1982 in internment camps in Białołęka, Jaworze and Darłówko.

In 1986 he moved to Chicago as a political refugee, where during the first two years he worked as a house painter and factory worker. In 1988 Czuma started to host his own radio show broadcast in the Chicago region first on WNVR 1030 AM and next on WPNA 1490 AM and was considered a prominent leader of Chicago's Polonia.

On 12 December 2006, he was sworn in as a member of the Polish Parliament. He was reelected in the next election on 21 October 2007. Czuma was the Minister of Justice from 23 January to 7 October 2009.

Czuma was awarded the Officer's Cross of the Order of Polonia Restituta by President Kazimierz Sabbat and the Commander's Cross with Star of Polonia Restituta by the Polish President Lech Kaczyński.
