= Barbara Piwnik =

Polish judge and politician (born 1955)

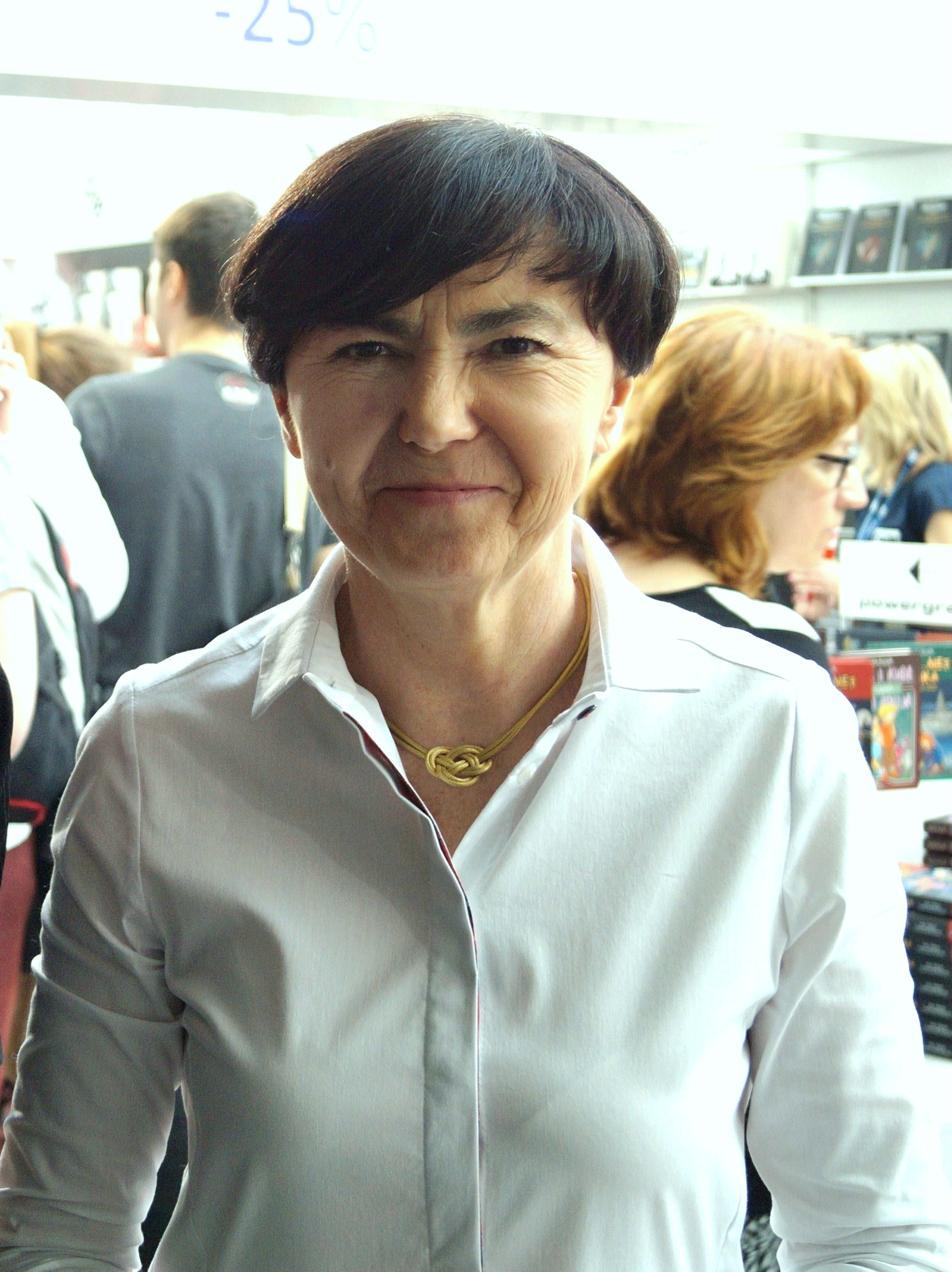

Minister of Justice
- In office 19 October 2001 – 6 July 2002
- Prime Minister: Leszek Miller
- Preceded by: Stanisław Iwanicki
- Succeeded by: Grzegorz Kurczuk

Personal details
- Born: 5 March 1955 (age 71) Kosowice, Poland
- Party: Independent

Barbara Elżbieta Piwnik (born 5 March 1955) is a Polish judge. She served as Minister of Justice of Poland from 2001 to 2002.

== Career ==
A judge by profession, on 19 October 2001, Piwnik was appointed Minister of Justice in the cabinet headed by Prime Minister Leszek Miller. She was an independent member of the cabinet. In July 2002, Prime Minister Miller requested her resignation.

Piwnik's term ended on 6 July 2002 and she was succeeded by Grzegorz Kurczuk as Minister of Justice.
