= Wilhelm Kalwas =

Wilhelm Maciej Kalwas
- Born: 4 July 1896; Pașcani, Kingdom of Romania
- Died: 1 February 1978 (aged 81) Warsaw, Polish People's Republic
- Branch: Polish Legions in World War I Polish Armed Forces (Second Polish Republic); Polish People's Army
- Service years: 1913-1949
- Conflicts: Battle of Koziatyn; Polish-Soviet War; Invasion of Poland (Battle of the Bzura)
- Children: Andrzej Kalwas

Wilhelm Maciej Kalwas (4 July 1896 in Pașcani - 1 February 1978 in Warsaw) – was a Polish military officer.

== Biography ==
Wilhelm Kalwas was born in 1896 in Pașcani, in the Romanian Old Kingdom.

In 1913, at the age of 17, he enlisted in the Rifle Teams in Horodenka in the Kingdom of Galicia and Lodomeria. After the reorganization of the teams, he was assigned to the 2nd Cavalry Regiment based in Brody, Ukraine, to the first Legions of Józef Piłsudski. He fought against the Russian Empire in World War I and against Soviet Russia in the Polish-Soviet war.

In 1922 he was promoted to the rank of lieutenant. He became a professional officer. In 1925 he was awarded the Legion's Cross by Józef Piłsudski. In the 1930s he was promoted to the rank of major and was transferred to the 7th Regiment of Mounted Rifles in Biedrusko, Poznań to the position of the regiment's first deputy commander.

During the Invasion of Poland in 1939 he became the first deputy commander of the 7th Mounted Rifle Regiment of the Wielkopolska Cavalry Brigade. Colonel Stanisław Królicki commanded the regiment, and general Roman Abraham commanded the brigade. Kalwas was wounded in the fighting near Włocławek. During the German occupation, he belonged to the Secret Polish Army, then to Konfederacja Zbrojna, and finally to the Home Army, where he stayed during the war.

From July 7, 1945, to January 14, 1949, he served in the Polish People's Army in the Command of the Military District No. 1, Division I.

In 1948, he was judged by the Honorary Officer Court for Staff Officers on account of being a Polish officer of the Second Republic of Poland. Kalwas died in Warsaw in 1978.

== Decorations ==
- Order Virtuti Militari (1919)
- Legion's Cross (1925)

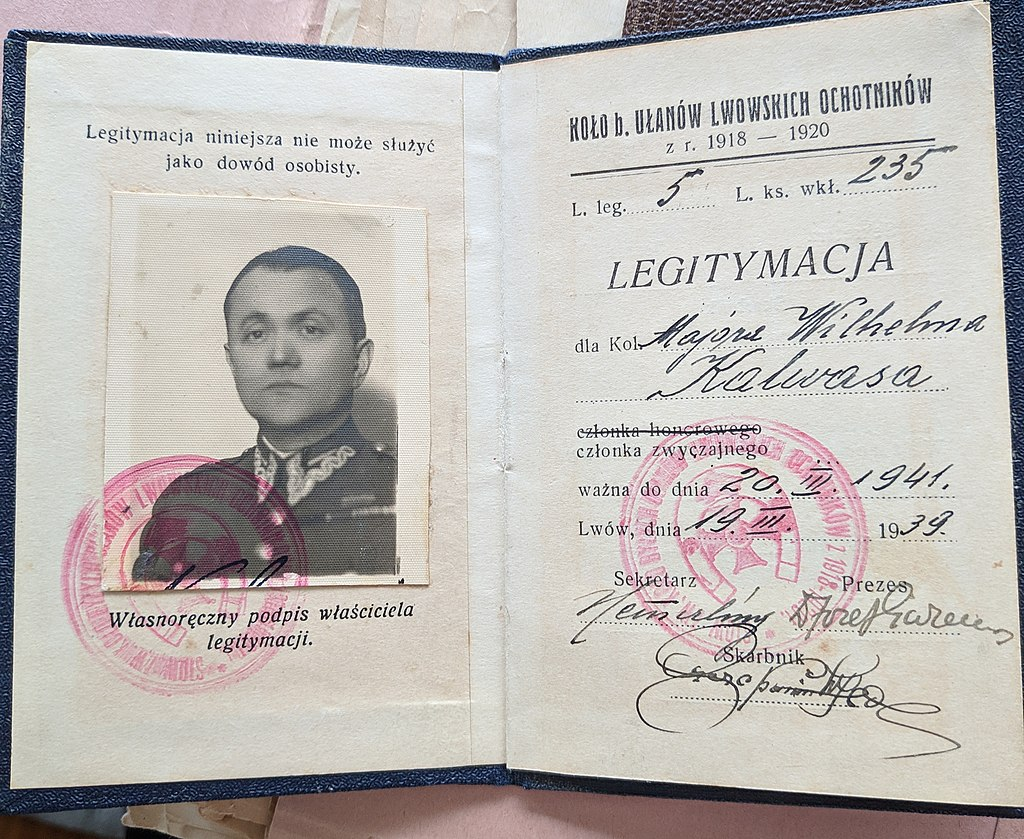
Military ID for Wilhelm Kalwas for being a member of the Circle of Ułanów of Lviv Volunteers in 1918–1920

- Order of Polonia Restituta (1946)
