= Andrzej Kalwas =

Polish lawyer and legal adviser (born 1936)

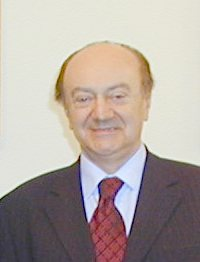

Minister of Justice
- In office 6 September 2004 – 31 October 2005
- Preceded by: Marek Sadowski
- Succeeded by: Zbigniew Ziobro

Personal details
- Born: 23 June 1936 (age 89) Włocławek
- Children: 2, including Piotr Ibrahim Kalwas
- Parent: Wilhelm Kalwas (father)
- Occupation: Politician, businessman, Legal Adviser, lawyer

Andrzej Jan Kalwas (born 23 June 1936 in Włoclawek) is a Polish lawyer, legal adviser, former minister of justice and attorney general in the government of Marek Belka.

== Biography ==
In 1963 he graduated from law studies at the University of Warsaw. He completed the apprenticeship at the State Commercial Arbitration, and in 1965 he started his career as a legal adviser. Since 1990, he has been the founder in the law firm of "Kalwas i wspólnicy".

In the years 1983–1995 he was the dean of the board of the District Chamber of Legal Advisors in Warsaw, and in the years 1995–2004 the president of the National Council of Legal Advisors.

In the periods 1989–1991 and 2002–2004 he was a member of the State Tribunal. He was also one of the founders of the Polish Chamber of Commerce. In 2004, he ran unsuccessfully in the elections to the European Parliament from the Warsaw list of the Voting Committee Together for the Future, formed by various non-governmental organizations.

On 6 September 2004, he was appointed by President Aleksander Kwaśniewski as the Minister of Justice in the government of Marek Belka, replacing Marek Sadowski. He served this function until the end of 31 October 2005.

On 18 April 2018, he was detained by officers of the Central Anticorruption Bureau to present him with charges as part of the investigation of persons claiming to be special services officers during the government of Civic Platform. He was released the next day on 19 April 2018.

== Personal life ==
Andrzej Kalwas was married to Hania Kalwas. They have two children.
