= Andrzej Marcinkowski =

Polish lawyer and politician

Andrzej Marcinkowski (28 February 1929 in Poznań – 13 March 2010) was a Polish lawyer and politician. He served as the acting Polish Minister of Justice from 25 November 1991 until 5 December 1991 within the government of Prime Minister Jan Krzysztof Bielecki. He was a recipient of the Commander's Cross and Commander's Cross with Star of the Order of Polonia Restituta.

Marcinkowski died on 13 March 2010, at the age of 81.
