= Piotr Ibrahim Kalwas =

Polish novelist and journalist

Piotr Ibrahim Kalwas (born 4 November 1963) is a Polish novelist, journalist, and twice nominated for the Nike Literary Award.

== Biography ==
Piotr Ibrahim Kalwas was born in 1963 in Powiśle, Warsaw to a family of Catholics in Poland. His father is a former Minister of Justice of Poland, Andrzej Kalwas. In his youth, Piotr Kalwas was a member of the youth punk subculture. He studied at a university, but was expelled, and earned a living by taking simple jobs, most notably when he worked as an illegal immigrant construction painter in Norway for 3 years and where he met his wife, Agata. Then he became involved in business, most notably as a restaurant manager in Warsaw, and he was among the writers of the popular Polish 1990s series "The World According to the Kiepski Family" (in his book, "Salam", Kalwas described "The World According to the Kiepski Family" as "the most intense show in the history of Polish television ").

In 2000, after long journeys to Asia and Africa, Kalwas converted to Islam and assumed the middle name of "Ibrahim". According to Kalwas himself, his religious views are close to Sufism, although he is not Sufi. In 2008, he moved to Egypt with his wife and son, and lived for 8 years in Alexandria from 2008 until 2016. Kalwas's life and work in Egypt became the main theme of his literary work – reportages for Polish media and several books. Kalwas lived in Egypt for eight years, but after publishing the book "Egypt: Haram, Halal" he left the country because of concerns about personal and family safety, considering the critical nature of his books and reports about Egyptian society, even the Egyptian government in some instances.

He currently lives in Gozo, Malta. He's married and has a son.

== Novels ==
- Salam, 2003
- Czas, 2005 – nominated for the Nike Literary Award 2006, the action takes place in Eritrea
- Drzwi, 2006
- Rasa mystica: traktat około Indii, 2008
- Dom, 2010
- Tarika, 2012
- Międzyrzecz, 2013
- Egipt: Haram Halal, 2015 (reportage) – nominated for the Nike Literary Award 2016
  - Ukrainian translation: "Єгипет: харам, халяль", translated by Les Beley, "Choven" (Човен, "Boat") Publishing House, 2018, ISBN 978-83-941461-7-7.
- Archipelag Islam, 2018
- Gozo. Radosna siostra Malty, 2020
- Dziecko Księżyca, 2021
- Marhaba, 2022
