= Corruption in Poland =

Corruption in Poland is below the world average but notable. Within Poland, surveys of Polish citizens reveal that it is perceived to be a major problem.

== Historical ==
In the early 1920s, during the first years of the Second Polish Republic, Polish institutions were plagued by endemic corruption, and several of the governments of the day were accused of widespread corruption, very likely with a sound cause. Between 1923 and 1926, Józef Piłsudski came to conclude that the system which he dubbed "Sejmocracy" fostered general corruption, ultimately leading him to launch the May Coup and seize power. His byword Sanation referred to the cleansing he promised to introduce, in contrast to his predecessors' shady practices.

However, once in power, his allies uncovered very few cases of corruption in past governments; persistent references to mass corruption amounted to a type of "primitive propaganda", in the words of historian Andrzej Garlicki. Later, it was Piłsudskiites who became embroiled in a well-publicized scandal revolving around election budgets, the Czechowicz affair. By the 1930s, the country had developed an economic model involving nationalised industry, with key industries in government hands. While this fostered growth in vital areas, it also gave rise to inefficiency and corruption. Private businesses found it hard to compete directly with state-owned concerns, in particular for public contracts.

In the communist People's Republic of Poland, corruption was widespread, particularly by Polish United Workers' Party officials (see nomenklatura). Corruption under the communist regime was so pervasive that some scholars have referred to the system as "legalized corruption".

== Recent era ==
Global Integrity 2010 report gave Poland a score of 80 out of 100 assessing the legal framework as 86 (strong) and actual implementation as 71 (moderate). The report scored Poland particularly well (score of 90) in the categories of "Non-Governmental Organizations, Public Information and Media" and "Elections", and particularly low in the category of "Public Administration and Professionalism" (score of 59).

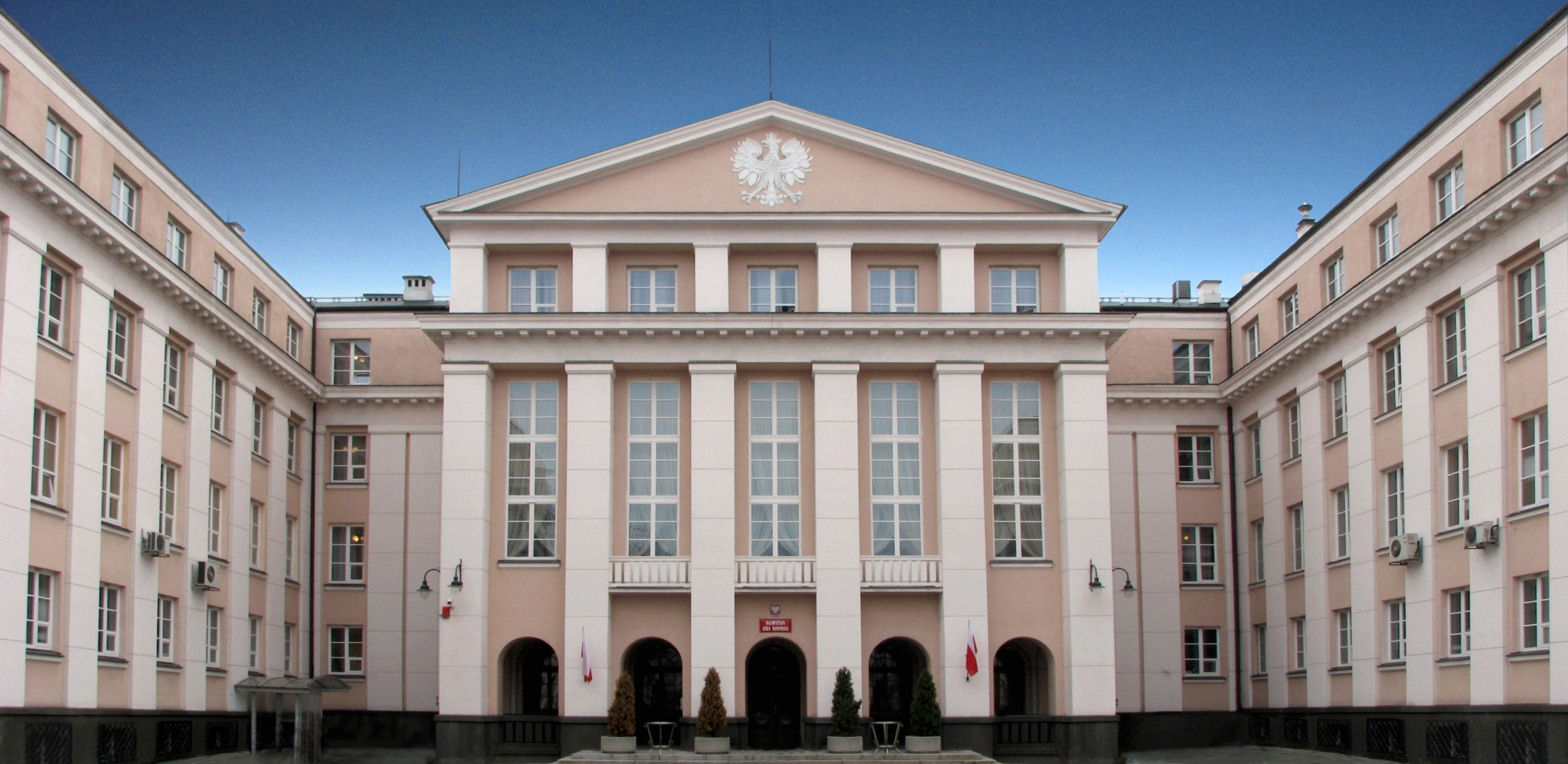
The Supreme Audit Office (NIK) offices

A 2011 report by the Institute of Public Affairs also criticized the standards of public life in Poland, and the prevalence of nepotism and cronyism.

A 2012 report jointly prepared by the Institute of Public Affairs (ISP) and Transparency International (TI) notes that corruption in Poland is lower than in the past when in the mid-1990s it was "a phenomenon of a systemic nature". As described in that report, the World Bank Worldwide Governance Indicators (accessible here ) for "rule of law" and "control of corruption" show steady improvement for Poland. Poland has joined the OECD Anti-Bribery Convention in 2000, implementing relevant legislation in 2001. Poland has also made significant progress in combating corruption like the establishment of the Central Anti-Corruption Bureau and the first anti-corruption strategy which was adopted in 2002.

The 2012 report from the ISP and TI, reviewing individual Polish anti-corruption institutions, praised the Supreme Audit Office (NIK), followed by the Polish Ombudsman (RPO). It criticized the civil society, the private sector, and the executive and public administration for insufficient efforts in fighting corruption. Poland's watchdog organisations are considered weak in combating corruption, and corruption allegations often appear in government contracting and permit issuance.

The 2012 report from the ISP and TI praised the overall direction of the anti-corruption efforts in Poland, noting that they are "bringing noticeable results", but noted that those efforts, particularly from the public authorities, are "rather chaotic, sometimes contradictory or even controversial". It concluded that "corruption in Poland still entails considerable risks" and "the level of anti-corruption protection is unsatisfactory". A 2013 OECD report analyzing the implementation of the OECD Anti-Bribery Convention concluded that "the current Polish framework for fighting foreign bribery is still inadequate".

A 2013 survey in Poland found that 83% of surveyed Polish citizens think that corruption is a major problem for their country, particularly prevalent among politicians (62 percent) and in the healthcare sector (53 percent). A growing number of citizens (57%) are concerned that there is no political will to fight corruption.

On Transparency International's 2025 Corruption Perceptions Index, Poland scored 53 on a scale from 0 ("highly corrupt") to 100 ("very clean"). When ranked by score, Poland ranked 52nd among the 182 countries in the Index, where the country ranked first is perceived to have the most honest public sector. For comparison with regional scores, the best score among Western European and European Union countries (Note: Austria, Belgium, Bulgaria, Croatia, Cyprus, Czechia, Denmark, Estonia, Finland, France, Germany, Greece, Hungary, Iceland, Ireland, Italy, Latvia, Lithuania, Luxembourg, Malta, Netherlands, Norway, Poland, Portugal, Romania, Slovakia, Slovenia, Spain, Sweden, Switzerland, and the United Kingdom.) was 89, the average score was 64 and the worst score was 40. For comparison with worldwide scores, the best score was 89 (ranked 1), the average score was 42, and the worst score was 9 (ranked 181, in a two-way tie).

The Polish cash-for-visa scandal (Polish: afera wizowa, lit. 'visa affair', also called: Polish: mafia wizowa, lit. 'visa mafia') was a political scandal concerning alleged corruption in the granting of travel visas by officials of the Polish Ministry of Foreign Affairs and the Polish consular service. The majority of recipients left Poland for other Schengen Area countries or for North America. According to critics, up to 350,000 visas may have been illegally issued in return for bribes.

== See also ==
- Central Anticorruption Bureau – Polish anti-corruption agency
- Corruption Perceptions Index – Country ranking by public sector corruption
- Crime in Poland
- Group of States Against Corruption – Council of Europe's anti-corruption monitoring body
- International Anti-Corruption Academy – Intergovernmental organization
- International Anti-Corruption Day – Annual event of the UN on 9 December
- ISO 37001 Anti-bribery management systems – Standard
- List of anti-corruption agencies
- OECD Anti-Bribery Convention – Anti-corruption agreement among high-economic power countries
- Police corruption in Poland – Abuse of power by civil law enforcement
- Transparency International – International non-governmental organization
- United Nations Convention against Corruption – Anti-corruption treaty
