= Waldemar Żurek =

Polish politician (born 1970)

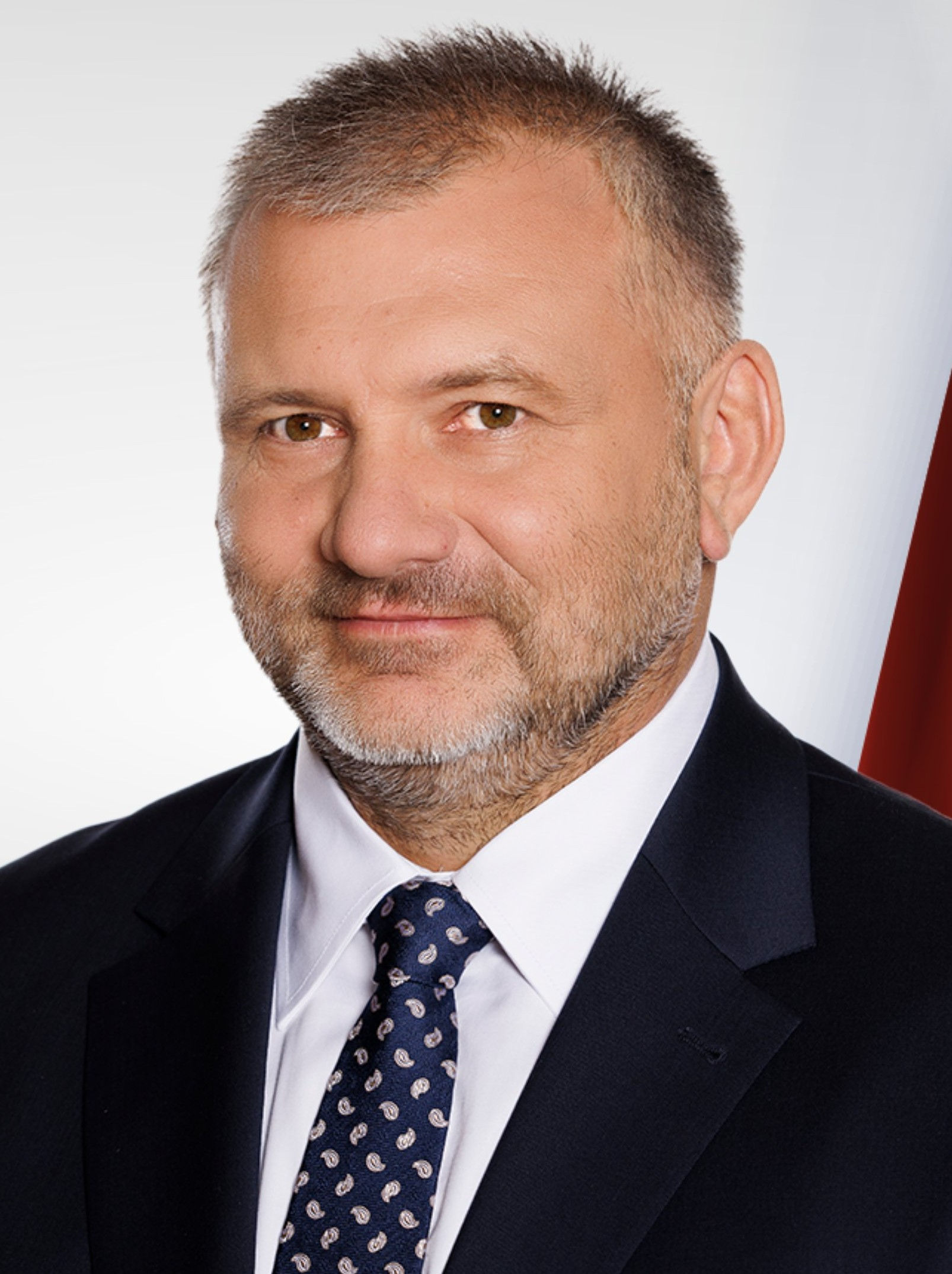
- Żurek in 2025

Minister of Justice Public Prosecutor General
- Incumbent
- Assumed office 24 July 2025
- Prime Minister: Donald Tusk
- Preceded by: Adam Bodnar

Personal details
- Born: 6 January 1970 (age 56) Chrzanów, Poland

Waldemar Żurek (born 6 January 1970) is a Polish politician, lawyer, former judge, and the Minister of Justice and Prosecutor General in the Third Cabinet of Donald Tusk, following the cabinet reshuffle announced on 23 July 2025. From 2010 to 2018, he was a member of the National Council of the Judiciary.

== Early life ==
Żurek was born in Chrzanów and attended the Technical School of Forestry in Brynek. He later attended and graduated from the Faculty of Law and Administration of the Jagiellonian University.

During his time as a student he was actively involved in the Confederation of Independent Poland which later split in various other political groups.

== Legal and Judicial career ==
He was employed as a chief specialist in the Ministry of Justice from 18 November 2002 to 17 May 2003.

He afterwards became a judge of the District Court of Kraków in 2005 and also served as the official spokesperson for the court for 14 years. During his tenure as a judge he was also assigned to administrative duties in the National School of Judiciary and Public Prosecution on two separate occasions from 4 May 2009 to 30 November 2009 and 30 June 2010 to 30 September 2010.

== Political career ==
On 23 July 2025 he was nominated by Prime Minister Donald Tusk to serve in his Third Cabinet as the Minister of Justice following a cabinet reshuffle. He was appointed a day later by President Andrzej Duda alongside all the other new nominees to the cabinet. As a result of him becoming the Minister of Justice he had to resign from his office of being a judge.
