= Grzegorz Kurczuk =

Polish politician (born 1949)

Member of Sejm
- In office 20 October 1997 – 4 November 2007

Minister of Justice
- In office 6 July 2002 – 2 May 2004

Personal details
- Born: 20 September 1949 (age 76) Warsaw
- Party: Democratic Left Alliance

Grzegorz Kurczuk (pronounced [ˈɡʐɛɡɔʂ ˈkurt͡ʂuk]; born 20 September 1949, in Warsaw) is a Polish politician. He was elected to the Sejm on 25 September 2005, getting 9,683 votes in 6 Lublin district as a candidate from Democratic Left Alliance list.

He was also a member of Senate 1993-1997, Sejm 1997-2001, and Sejm 2001-2005.

== See also ==
- Members of Polish Sejm 2005-2007
