= Zbigniew Ćwiąkalski =

Polish politician (born 1950)

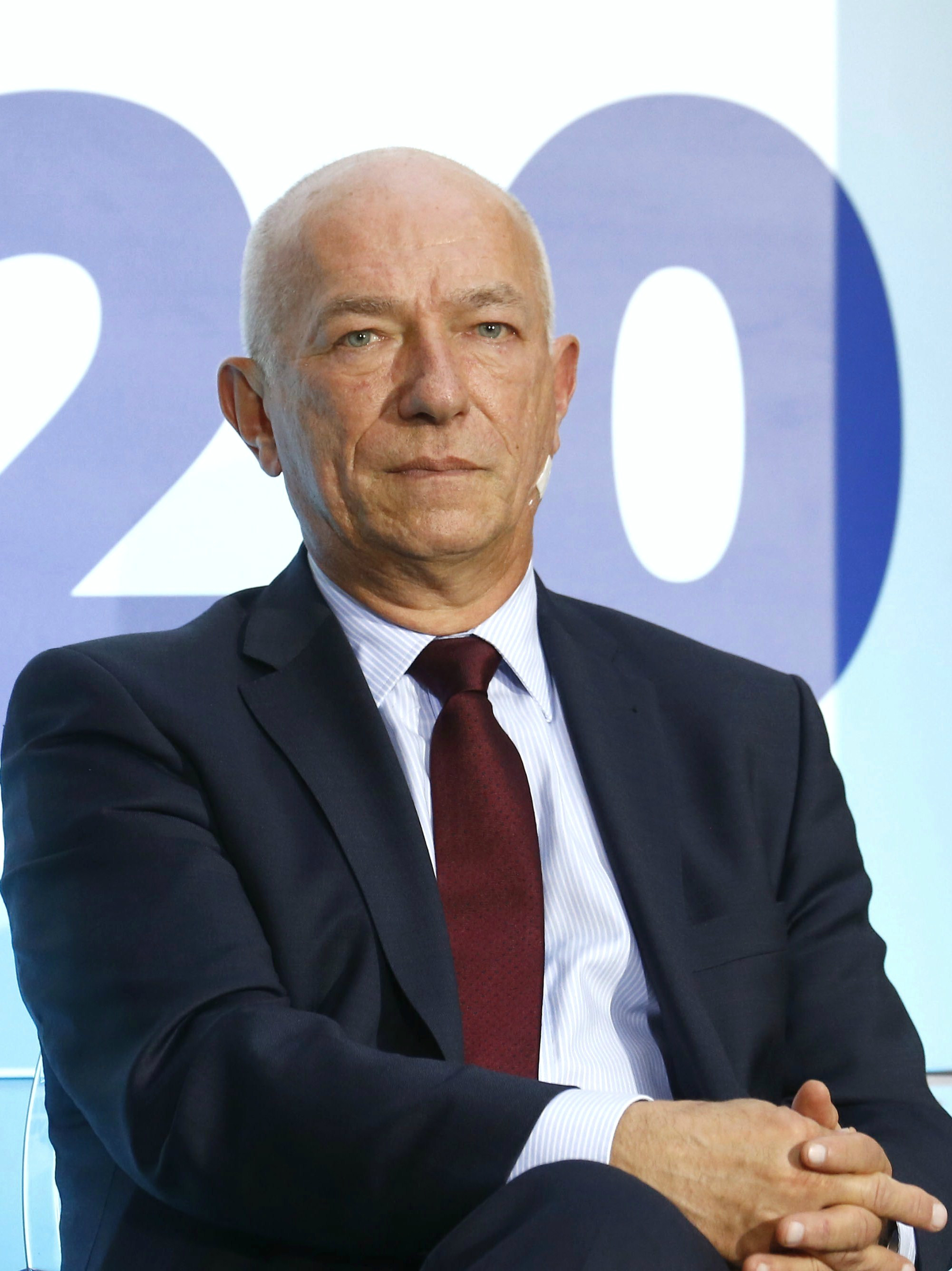
Zbigniew Ćwiąkalski

Zbigniew Ćwiąkalski (IPA: [ˈzbiɡɲɛf t͡ɕfjɔŋˈkalskʲi]; born March 9, 1950, in Łańcut) is a Polish politician, former Minister of Justice and Public Prosecutor General of Poland. He is a qualified lawyer, adwokat, and associate professor of law at the Jagiellonian University (Chair of Penal Law, Faculty of Law and Administration).

From 1972 to 1981 he was a member of the Polish United Workers' Party at Jagiellonian University. In 1981 he joined the Polish opposition (the Solidarity trade union).

In 1985 he was accused of being a secret collaborator of communist Służba Bezpieczeństwa, but there was no evidence of this.

From 2007 to 2009 he was the Minister of Justice in the government of Donald Tusk.
