= Ministry of Justice (Poland) =

Government ministry of Poland

- Ministerstwo Sprawiedliwości
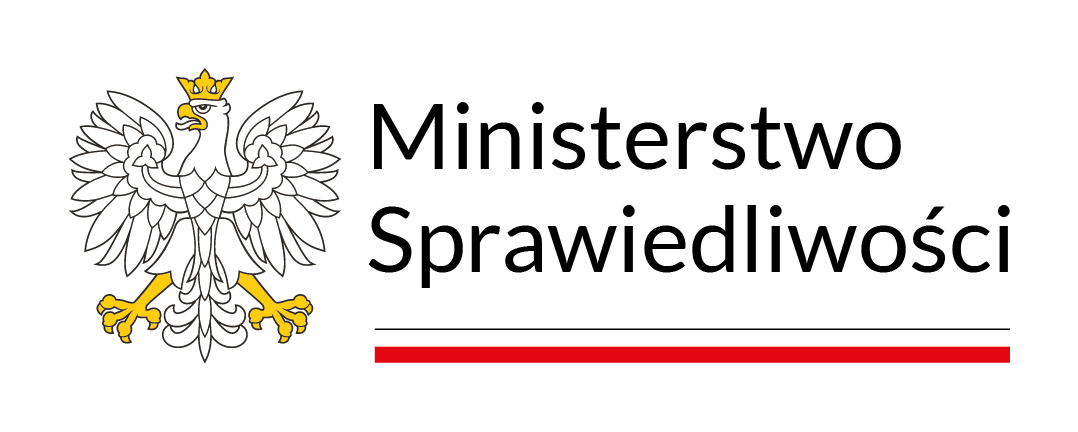
- Ministerial logotype

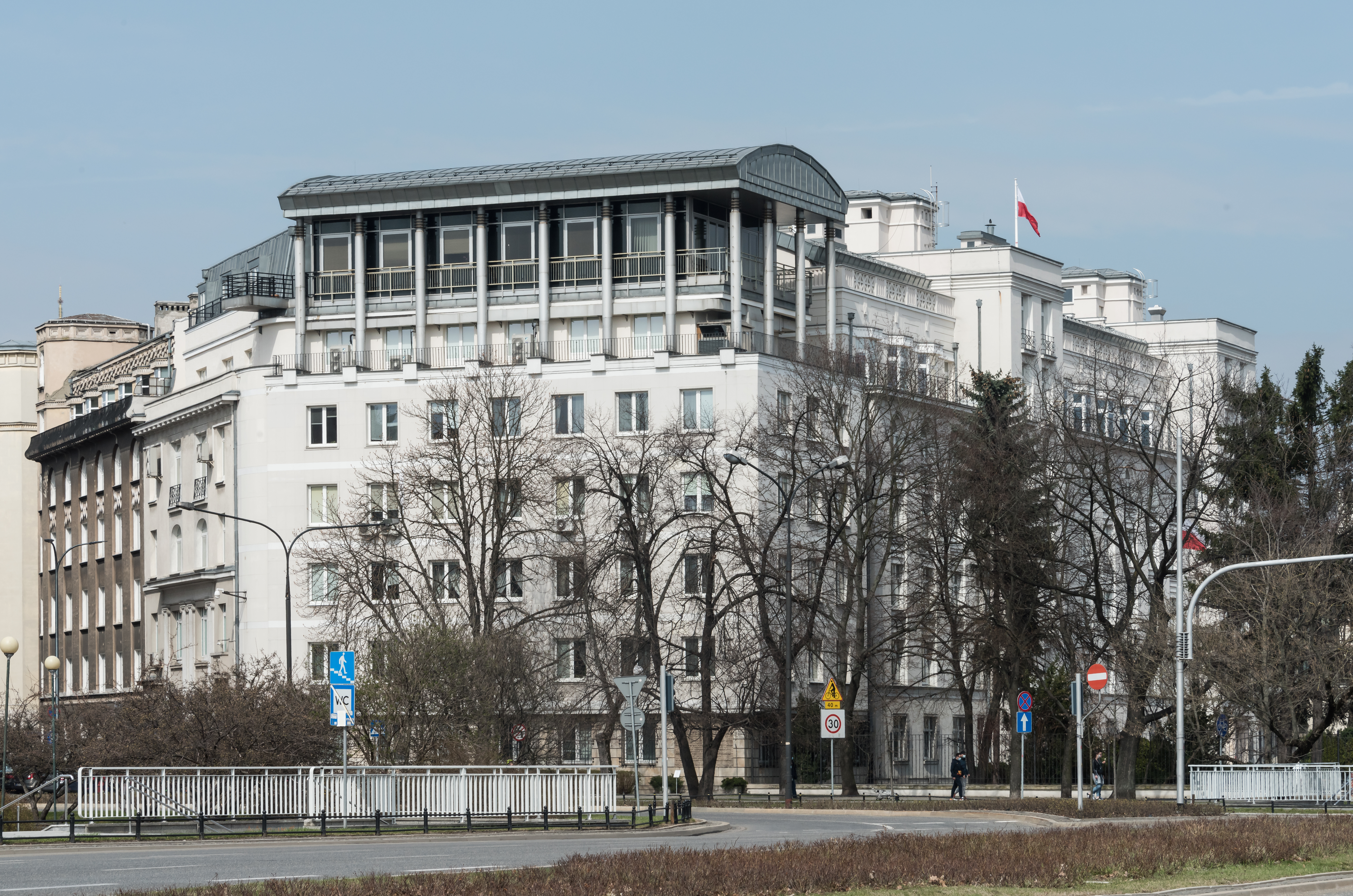
- The seat of the Ministry of Justice at 11 Al. Ujazdowskie, opposite the Sejm in central Warsaw

Agency overview
- Headquarters: Al. Ujazdowskie 11, Warsaw
- Agency executive: Waldemar Żurek, Minister of Justice
- Parent agency: Council of Ministers
- Website: www.gov.pl/sprawiedliwosc

The Ministry of Justice of the Republic of Poland is one of the ministries of Poland.

The Ministry of Justice was established by the Decree of the Council of Ministers of 3 November 1999 on the creation of the Ministry of Justice.

The remit of the Minister of Justice is set out in the Ordinance of the President of the Council of Ministers of 13 December 2017 on the detailed scope of activities of the Minister of Justice.

The Ministry of Justice is a subsidiary office of the Minister of Justice, the chief government administration body responsible for the justice branch of government administration.

From 1956 to 1957, Zofia Wasilkowska was the first woman to serve as a Minister of Justice in Poland's history.

Each Minister of Justice between 1990 and 2010 and since 2016 has also been Public Prosecutor General.

== Competences of the Minister of Justice ==
The regulation defines the detailed scope of the Minister of Justice's competences:

1. The Minister heads the department of government administration - justice.
2. The Minister is the disposer of parts 15 and 37 of the state budget.
3. The Minister's services are provided by the Ministry of Justice.

=== The justice department covers matters of ===
1. judiciary,
2. prosecutor's office, notary's office, advocacy service and legal counsels, within the scope resulting from separate provisions,
3. the execution of penalties and educational and correctional measures ordered by the courts, and matters of post-penitentiary assistance.

The minister competent for justice shall ensure the preparation of draft codifications of civil law, including family law, and criminal law.

The Minister competent for matters of justice shall be competent in matters of the judiciary within the scope of matters not reserved by separate regulations to the competence of other state bodies and taking into account the principle of judicial independence.

== List of ministers ==
=== Ministers of Justice (1989–present) ===
Portrait	Name	Party	Term of office		Prime Minister (cabinet)
	Aleksander Bentkowski	United People's Party/Polish People's Party	12 September 1989	12 January 1991	Tadeusz Mazowiecki (Mazowiecki)
	Wiesław Chrzanowski	Christian National Union	12 January 1991	25 November 1991	Jan Krzysztof Bielecki (Bielecki)
	Andrzej Marcinkowski (acting)	Independent	25 November 1991	5 December 1991	Jan Krzysztof Bielecki (Bielecki)
	Zbigniew Dyka	Christian National Union	23 December 1991	17 March 1993	Jan Olszewski (Olszewski), Hanna Suchocka (Suchocka)
	Jan Piątkowski	Christian National Union	17 March 1993	26 October 1993	Hanna Suchocka (Suchocka)
	Włodzimierz Cimoszewicz	SdRP	26 October 1993	6 March 1995	Waldemar Pawlak (Pawlak II)
	Jerzy Jaskiernia	SdRP	6 March 1995	7 February 1996	Józef Oleksy (Oleksy)
	Leszek Kubicki	Independent	7 February 1996	31 October 1997	Włodzimierz Cimoszewicz (Cimoszewicz)
	Hanna Suchocka	Freedom Union	31 October 1997	8 June 2000	Jerzy Buzek (Buzek)
	Jerzy Buzek (acting)	Solidarity Electoral Action	8 June 2000	12 June 2000	Jerzy Buzek (Buzek)
	Lech Kaczyński	Law and Justice	12 June 2000	4 July 2001	Jerzy Buzek (Buzek)
	Stanisław Iwanicki	Solidarity Electoral Action	4 July 2001	19 October 2001	Jerzy Buzek (Buzek)
	Barbara Piwnik	Independent	19 October 2001	6 July 2002	Leszek Miller (Miller)
	Grzegorz Kurczuk	Democratic Left Alliance	6 July 2002	2 May 2004	Leszek Miller (Miller)
	Marek Sadowski	Independent	2 May 2004	6 September 2004	Marek Belka (Belka I)
	Andrzej Kalwas	Independent	6 September 2004	31 October 2005	Marek Belka (Belka II)
	Zbigniew Ziobro	Law and Justice	31 October 2005	7 September 2007	Kazimierz Marcinkiewicz (Marcinkiewicz), Jarosław Kaczyński (Kaczyński)
	Jarosław Kaczyński (acting)	Law and Justice	7 September 2007	11 September 2007	Jarosław Kaczyński (Kaczyński)
	Zbigniew Ziobro	Law and Justice	11 September 2007	16 November 2007	Jarosław Kaczyński (Kaczyński)
	Zbigniew Ćwiąkalski	Independent	16 November 2007	21 January 2009	Donald Tusk (Tusk I)
	Andrzej Czuma	Civic Platform	21 January 2009	13 October 2009	Donald Tusk (Tusk I)
	Krzysztof Kwiatkowski	Civic Platform	13 October 2009	18 November 2011	Donald Tusk (Tusk I)
	Jarosław Gowin	Civic Platform	18 November 2011	29 April 2013	Donald Tusk (Tusk II)
	Marek Biernacki	Civic Platform	29 April 2013	22 September 2014	Donald Tusk (Tusk II)
	Cezary Grabarczyk	Civic Platform	22 September 2014	30 April 2015	Ewa Kopacz (Kopacz)
	Ewa Kopacz (acting)	Civic Platform	30 April 2015	4 May 2015	Ewa Kopacz (Kopacz)
	Borys Budka	Civic Platform	4 May 2015	16 November 2015	Ewa Kopacz (Kopacz)
	Zbigniew Ziobro	United Poland / Sovereign Poland	16 November 2015	27 November 2023	Beata Szydło (Szydło), Mateusz Morawiecki (Morawiecki, Morawiecki II)
	Marcin Warchoł	Sovereign Poland	27 November 2023	13 December 2023	Mateusz Morawiecki (Morawiecki III)
	Adam Bodnar	Independent	13 December 2023	24 July 2025	Donald Tusk (Tusk III)
	Waldemar Żurek	Independent	24 July 2025	Incumbent	Donald Tusk (Tusk III)

== Charity regulator ==
In Poland, the regulation of non-profit organisations is primarily governed by the Ministry of Justice. The Ministry of Justice, jointly with regional courts, administers the National Court Register. The National Court Register serves as the official register for businesses, professional organisations, non-profit foundations, public health institutions, and bankrupt debtors.

== See also ==
- Justice ministry
- Politics of Poland
- National Court Register
