= Public Prosecutor General (Poland) =

The Attorney General or (Public) Prosecutor General (Polish: Prokurator Generalny [prɔ.kuˈra.tɔr ɡɛ.nɛˈral.nɘ]) is the top prosecutorial official in Poland. The Office of the Public Prosecutor General has authority over the National Public Prosecutor, public prosecutors of universal prosecutorial bodies, regional prosecutorial bodies and various specific prosecutorial commissions. Apart from a brief period between 2010 and 2016, the position of Public Prosecutor General has been held concurrently by the Minister of Justice. Waldemar Żurek has served as Public Prosecutor General since 24 July 2025.

== History and legislative development ==
=== 1950–85 ===
After the establishment of the Polish People's Republic following the Second World War, Polish prosecutorial law largely emulated similar Soviet statutes and conventions. The 1950 Prosecution Service Act established the Polish prosecution service as an independent body under the supervision of the Council of State. Under this legislative framework, the prosecution service was headed by a General Prosecutor and had jurisdiction over state bodies and private citizens. In addition to the prosecution of crimes, the procuracy became responsible for enforcing loyalty to the ‘socialist rule of law’ and was closely controlled by the Polish United Workers' Party, despite its nominal independence from party rule. Under the 1950 Act, the procuracy was removed from the judicial branch of government and became a separate, nominally independent organisation under the auspices of the Council of State, an executive body.

=== 1985–2010 ===
The 1950 Act was replaced by the 1985 Act on the Public Prosecutor's Office. Significant amendments made after Poland's transition to democracy removed the prosecution service from the control of the abolished Council of State and combined the role of Public Prosecutor General with the Minister of Justice. This amendment aimed to relieve the prosecution of political interference and impropriety given the accountability of the Minister of Justice to the Sejm. It was supposed that parliamentary accountability would foster greater transparency and reduce arbitrariness in prosecutorial judgements. However, in practice the combination of the Minister of Justice with the office of Public Prosecutor General has permitted political control and influence of the prosecution service by the ruling party of the day, with prosecutorial decisions exposed to the exigencies of party politics. Under 2007 amendments to the Act, the Minister of Justice was given power to personally make orders on ongoing cases.

=== 2010–2016 ===
2010 amendments to the Act on the Public Prosecutor's Office separated the role of Public Prosecutor General from that of Minister of Justice. The reforms coincided with the election of a more liberal government and sought to protect the prosecution service from political interference and guarantee its independence. The Prosecutor General was to be appointed by the President of Poland from a choice of two candidates for a renewable term of six years. Candidates were nominated by legal and judicial experts from the National Procurators Council and the National Judicial Council. The Prosecutor General was protected from removal without cause. With cause, any motion for removal required a two-thirds majority of Parliament. These entrenching provisions sought to create security of tenure and to remove the potential for party-political interference in the duties of the Prosecutor General.

=== 2016–present ===
In 2016, after the 2015 election of the Law and Justice Party, the Act on the Public Prosecutor's Office was amended to reintegrate the offices of Minister of Justice and Public Prosecutor General. The amended Act gave further powers to the Prosecutor General to “change or revoke” the decisions of a subordinate prosecutor, appoint prosecutors to positions without conducting a competition and, importantly, to unilaterally transfer and demote subordinate prosecutors within the prosecution service without cause. These amendments came contemporaneously with other reforms which granted the Minister of Justice more power over the appointment and constitution of superior courts.

The Commissioner for Human Rights of Poland unsuccessfully challenged a number of the amended provisions before the Polish Constitutional Tribunal.

In justifying the amendments, the Law and Justice Party argued that the dual role of Minister of Justice and Public Prosecutor General better reflected pre and post-Soviet Polish legal tradition and that the amendments increased the accountability and efficiency of the prosecution service. It was also noted by defenders of the amendments that a number of other European jurisdictions had also subordinated the Public Prosecutor General to the Minister of Justice. The European Commission for Democracy Through Law (Venice Commission) distinguished the Polish amendments: “it does not only subordinate or link the prosecution office to the Minister of Justice, but the latter becomes the chief prosecutorial body.” The 2016 amendments have continued to be a controversial issue in Poland.

== Hierarchy ==
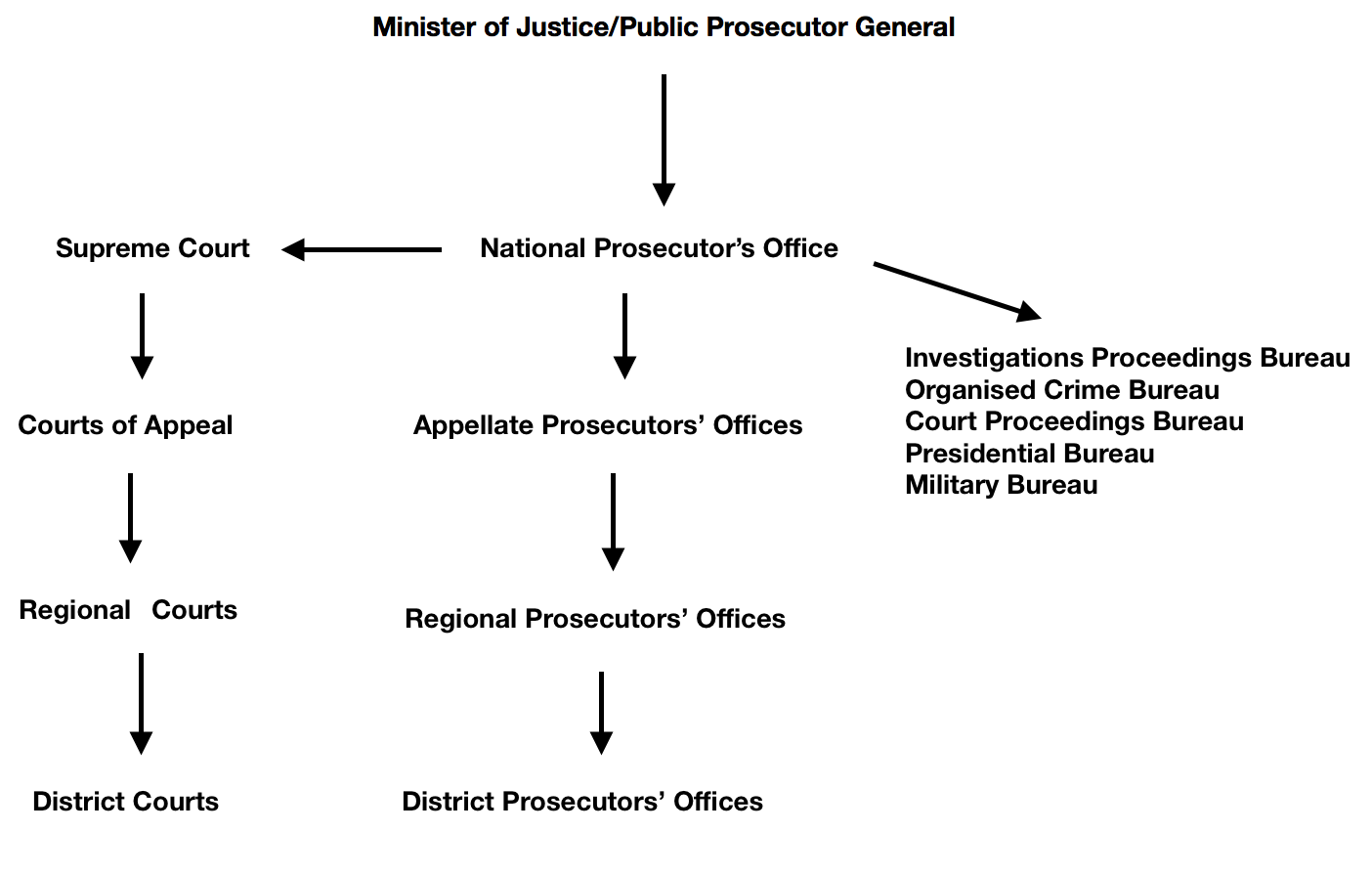
Polish Prosecutorial Hierarchy

Article 13(1) of the Act on the Public Prosecutor's Office establishes the Public Prosecutor General as being “in charge” of the Public Prosecutor's Office which consists of the entire apparatus of the Polish prosecution service. Under Article 14(1), the National Public Prosecutor is the Prosecutor General's first deputy. The Prosecutor General may delegate the exercise of their powers and tasks to the National Public Prosecutor or another specified deputy. Subject-specific branch divisions and departments are established through the office of the National Public Prosecutor. Examples include the Branch Division of the Department for Organised Crime and Corruption and the Department for Military Matters. Below the National Public Prosecutor's office are, in order of superiority, offices of provincial public prosecutors; regional public prosecutors; and district public prosecutors. Each office reports to the immediately superior office in the hierarchical chain.

== Powers ==
Article 2 of the Act on the Public Prosecutor's Office stipulates that the office broadly “executes tasks related to prosecuting crimes, and maintain[ing] law and order.” Article 3 provides elaboration, dividing this general duty into 14 specific responsibilities. Some of these relate to cooperation with other law enforcement bodies while others permit the Prosecutor General to gather IT data and to conduct research on crime and crime prevention. Further responsibilities include normal prosecutorial functions such as appealing against decisions and bringing civil actions in court. The most significant departure from previous iterations of the Act is found in Article 7(3) which grants the Prosecutor General power to make orders “concerning the content of an act in court” by a subordinate prosecutor. Subordinate prosecutors are bound to act in accordance with such orders.

== Criticism ==
The 2016 amendments to the Act on the Public Prosecutor's Office have drawn domestic and international criticism from academics, intergovernmental organisations and civic groups. These concerns have largely been related to a perceived reduction in prosecutorial independence, and questioning of the appropriateness of the dual-role of Justice Minister and Public Prosecutor, given the potential for conflicts to arise. An article in Foreign Policy argued that the 2016 amendments “greatly expanded power to interfere with rank-and-file prosecutors, their decisions, and their freedoms of speech and association.” A 2019 report by Amnesty International found that, in 2016, immediately after the amendments, all 11 leaders of regional prosecution offices, 44 of 45 leaders of county prosecution offices and the “vast majority” of the 342 prosecutions leading regional offices had been replaced. Furthermore, approximately 200 prosecutors took early retirement after the 2015 election in order to avoid the effects of the new amendments. It has been reported that demotion and transfer have been used as tools to enforce political loyalty amongst prosecutors. A number of prosecutors have been demoted and transferred to less prominent roles after speaking out against the government.

Rule of Law advocates have criticised the close involvement of the Public Prosecutor General in day-to-day prosecutorial affairs. Rule of Law in Poland, a civic advocacy body, has argued that concentration of prosecutorial power in the Minister of Justice has allowed for party-political outcomes to dictate the appointment of prosecutors and corrupted the procedure for deciding whether or not to prosecute certain cases. According to Rule of Law in Poland, “the extensive interference of the Prosecutor General in ongoing pre-trial proceedings makes it possible to prosecute people the authorities find inconvenient and discontinue proceedings against those who support the authorities.”

The power of the Prosecutor General over disciplinary proceedings has also been questioned. Under the 2016 Act, the Prosecutor General appoints members of the Disciplinary Court of the Prosecutor General. The Prosecutor General may also request that an investigation be initiated against certain prosecutors. Given the combination of the Prosecutor General's role with that of Justice Minister, it has been argued that disciplinary proceedings have become a political rather than administrative tool which is used to ensure loyalty from the prosecutorial service.

The Council of Europe prepared a detailed report on the 2016 Act on the Public Prosecutor's Office. It provided the following recommendation regarding the powers of the Public Prosecutor General:

“...given the extensive powers of the Public Prosecutor General...the offices of the Public Prosecutor General and the Minister of Justice should be separated. In addition, the provisions concerning the powers of the Public Prosecutor General to intervene in particular cases should be reduced and safeguards should be provided...If the current system of merger of offices were maintained, then any competence of the Public Prosecutor General (ie. the Minister of Justice) to intervene in individual cases should be excluded and his/her competences should be limited to giving general regulations and guidelines to the subordinate prosecutors in order to prevent any risk of political manipulation…”

== Regional comparison ==
In the majority of European jurisdictions, the role of Minister of Justice is separate from that of Public Prosecutor General. A 2009 report by the Committee of Ministers of the Council of Europe recognised an increasing European tendency towards independent, rather than subordinate prosecutorial offices. The European Council advised that “prosecutorial systems where the public prosecution is part of or subordinated to the government are in line with European standards, provided that effective measures to guarantee the independence and autonomy of the prosecution office and safeguards against in particular government intervention in particular cases are in place.”

Some European jurisdictions still have a prosecution service which is subordinate to the Minister of Justice. These include Austria, Denmark, Germany and the Netherlands. According to the Council of Europe, these jurisdictions have safeguards to protect against government interference and intervention. Poland's post-2010 system is unique in that “it does not only subordinate or link the prosecution office to the Minister of Justice, but the latter becomes the chief prosecutorial body.”
