= Central Anticorruption Bureau =

Polish anti-corruption agency

Coordinates: 52°13′05″N 21°01′30″E

Central Anticorruption Bureau Centralne Biuro Antykorupcyjne
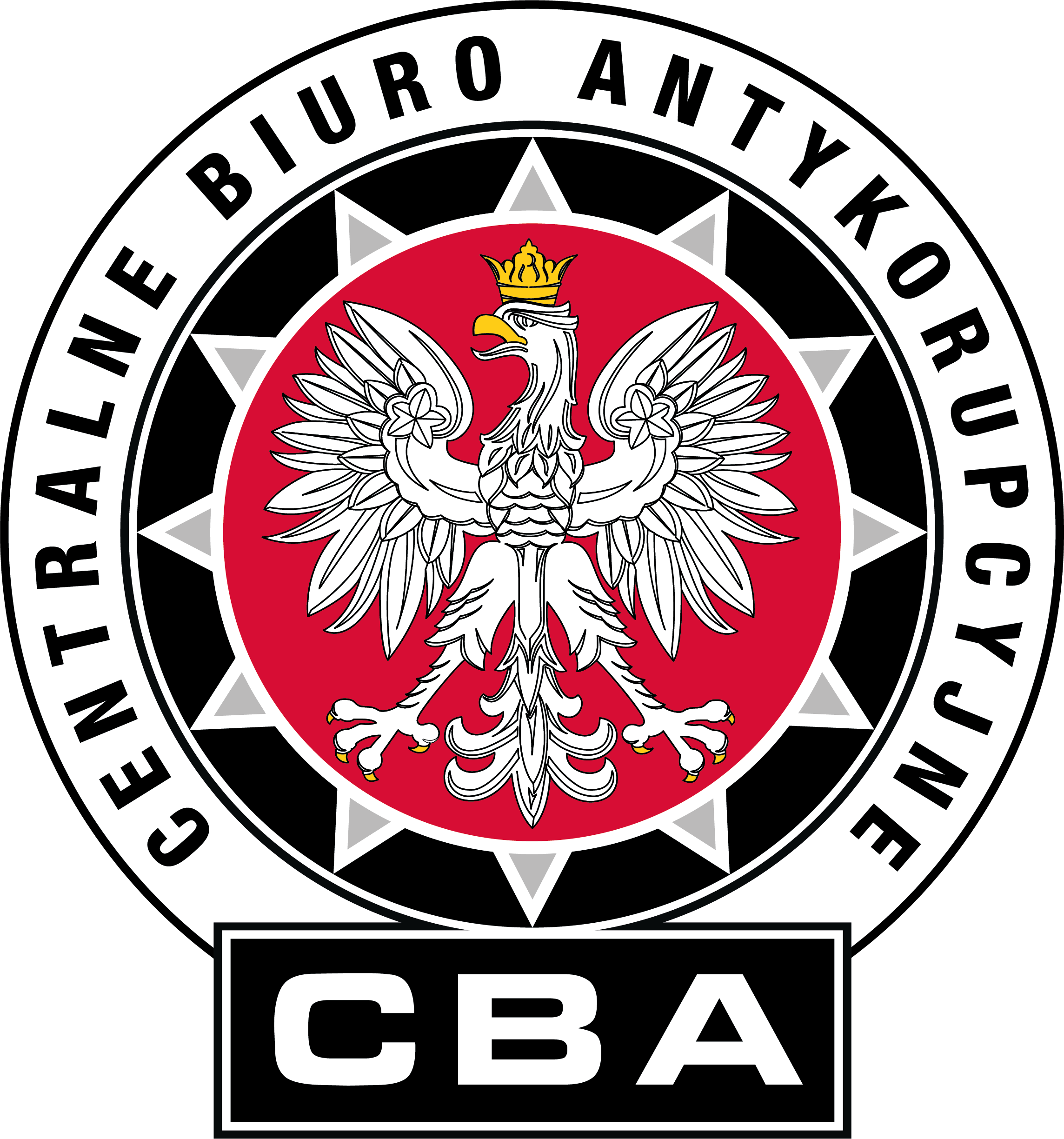
- Logo of CBA
- Abbreviation: CBA

Agency overview
- Formed: 2006; 20 years ago

Jurisdictional structure
- Operations jurisdiction: Poland
- Specialist jurisdiction: Anti-corruption

Operational structure
- Headquarters: Warsaw
- Elected officer responsible: Donald Tusk, Prime Minister of Poland
- Agency executive: Tomasz Strzelczyk, Head of CBA

Website
- www.cba.gov.pl

The Central Anticorruption Bureau (CBA, Polish: Centralne Biuro Antykorupcyjne) is a division of the Polish government, reporting to the Prime Minister of Poland, responsible for addressing corruption in Poland. Located in Warsaw, the CBA has been functional since 24 July 2006, having been activated by the June 2006 Central Anticorruption Bureau Bill. While it works in both public and private sectors, it is particularly focused on combatting corruption in state and self-government institutions. Its scope includes both investigating criminal corruption and preventing corruption which is not yet criminal. It is given the duty of informing the Prime Minister, the President of Poland and the National Assembly of the Republic of Poland of matters which may affect the economic well-being of the Polish state.

CBA is headed by Tomasz Strzelczyk.

== See also ==
- Corruption in Poland
- Corruption Perceptions Index – Country ranking by public sector corruption
