= Cholewa =

Cholewa is a Polish surname. It can refer to:

- Anita F. Cholewa (born 1953), American botanist
- Marek Cholewa (born 1963), Polish ice hockey player
- Michał Cholewa (writer) (born 1980), Polish fantasy and science fiction writer
- Michał Cholewa (born 1986), Polish diplomat
- Laurie Cholewa (born 1980), French television presenter
- Cholewa coat of arms, used by many Polish szlachta
