= Michał Cholewa =

Michał Cholewa may refer to:

- Michał Cholewa (writer)
- Michał Cholewa (diplomat)
