= Paweł Lechowicz =

Polish politician

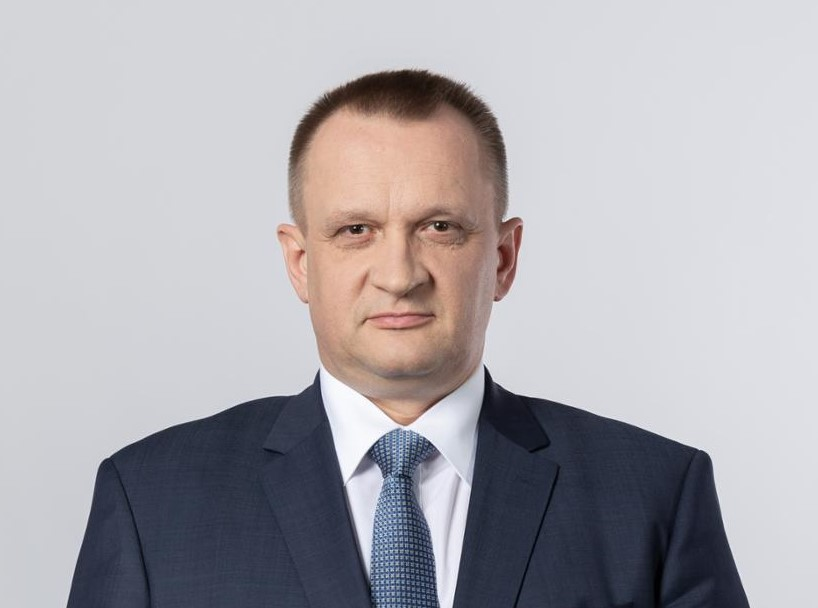

6th Poland Ambassador to Kuwait
- In office December 2017 – 15 June 2023
- Preceded by: Grzegorz Olszak
- Succeeded by: Michał Cholewa

Personal details
- Education: University of Łódź
- Profession: civil servant, diplomat, intelligence officer

Paweł Lechowicz is a Polish civil servant who served as the Ambassador of the Republic of Poland to Kuwait (2017–2023).

== Life ==
Paweł Lechowicz in 1991 has graduated from history at the University of Łódź specializing in history of international relations.

After graduation he started his career at the Office for State Protection, office in Łódź. From 2001 to 2004 he worked for the Supreme Audit Office. Between 2006 and 2008, as the colonel, he was the deputy head of Foreign Intelligence Agency. Between 2009 and 2013 he worked at the embassy in Washington, D.C., where he was responsible for security issues, especially of the countries of the Persian Gulf Basin. After that, he was the deputy director of the Inspectorate of the Foreign Service and the director of the Bureau for the Protection of Classified Information.

Between December 2017 and 15 June 2023 he served as the Ambassador of Poland to Kuwait, accredited additionally to Bahrain.

== Honours ==
- Knight's Cross of the Order of Polonia Restituta
- Gold Cross of Merit (2002)
- Silver Cross of Merit (2006)
- Bronze Cross of Merit (1999)
- Gold Medal of Merit for National Defence
- Legion of Merit
