= Persian Gulf =

Mediterranean sea in West Asia

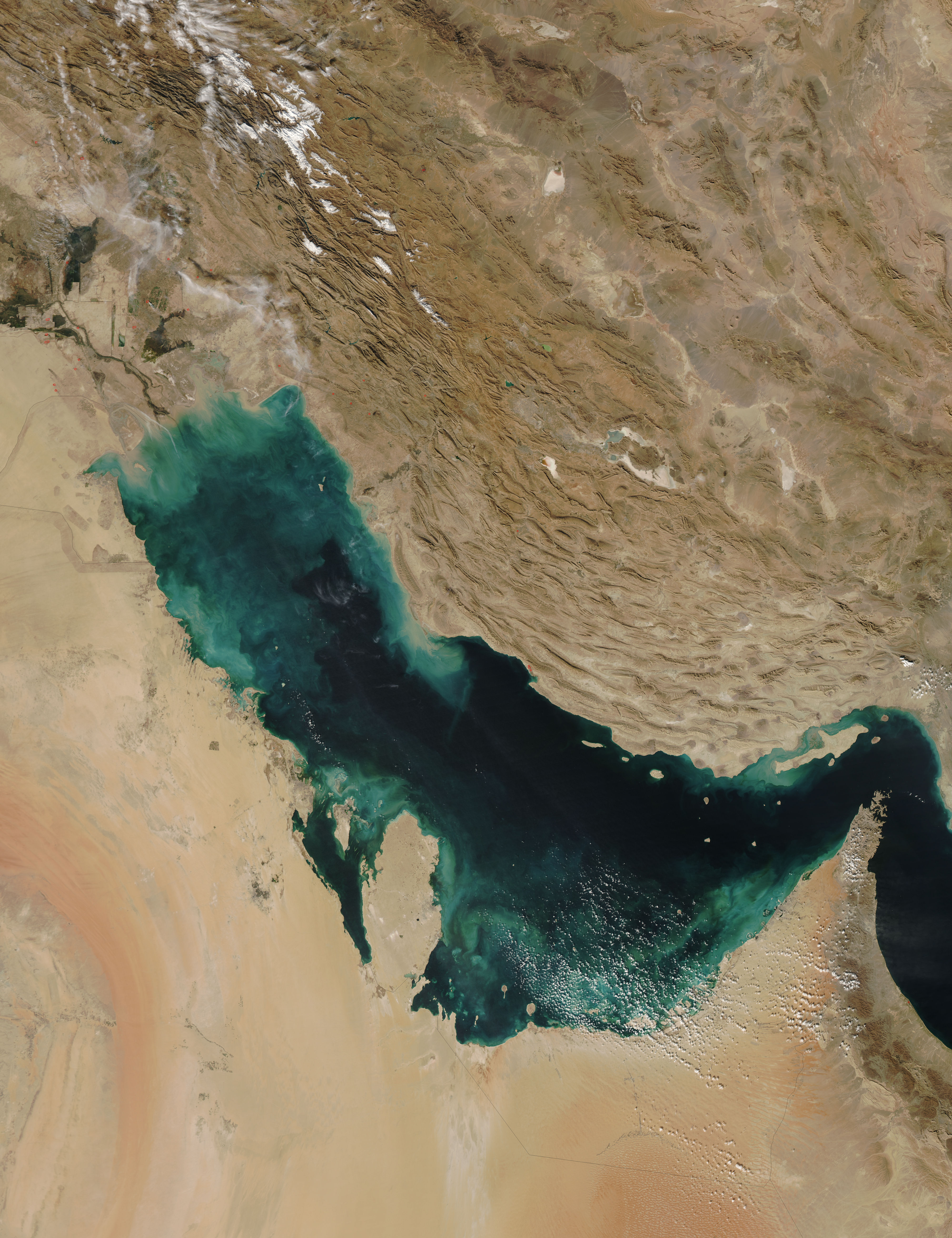
- The Persian Gulf from space
- Interactive map of Persian Gulf
- Location: West Asia
- Coordinates: 26°N 52°E
- Type: Gulf
- Primary inflows: Gulf of Oman, Shatt al-Arab
- Basin countries: Iran, Iraq, Kuwait, Saudi Arabia, Bahrain, Qatar, the United Arab Emirates, and Oman (exclave of Musandam)
- Max. length: 989 km (615 mi)
- Surface area: 251,000 km^{2} (97,000 sq mi)
- Average depth: 50 m (160 ft)
- Max. depth: 90 m (300 ft)
- Water volume: 8,780 km^{3} (2,100 cu mi)

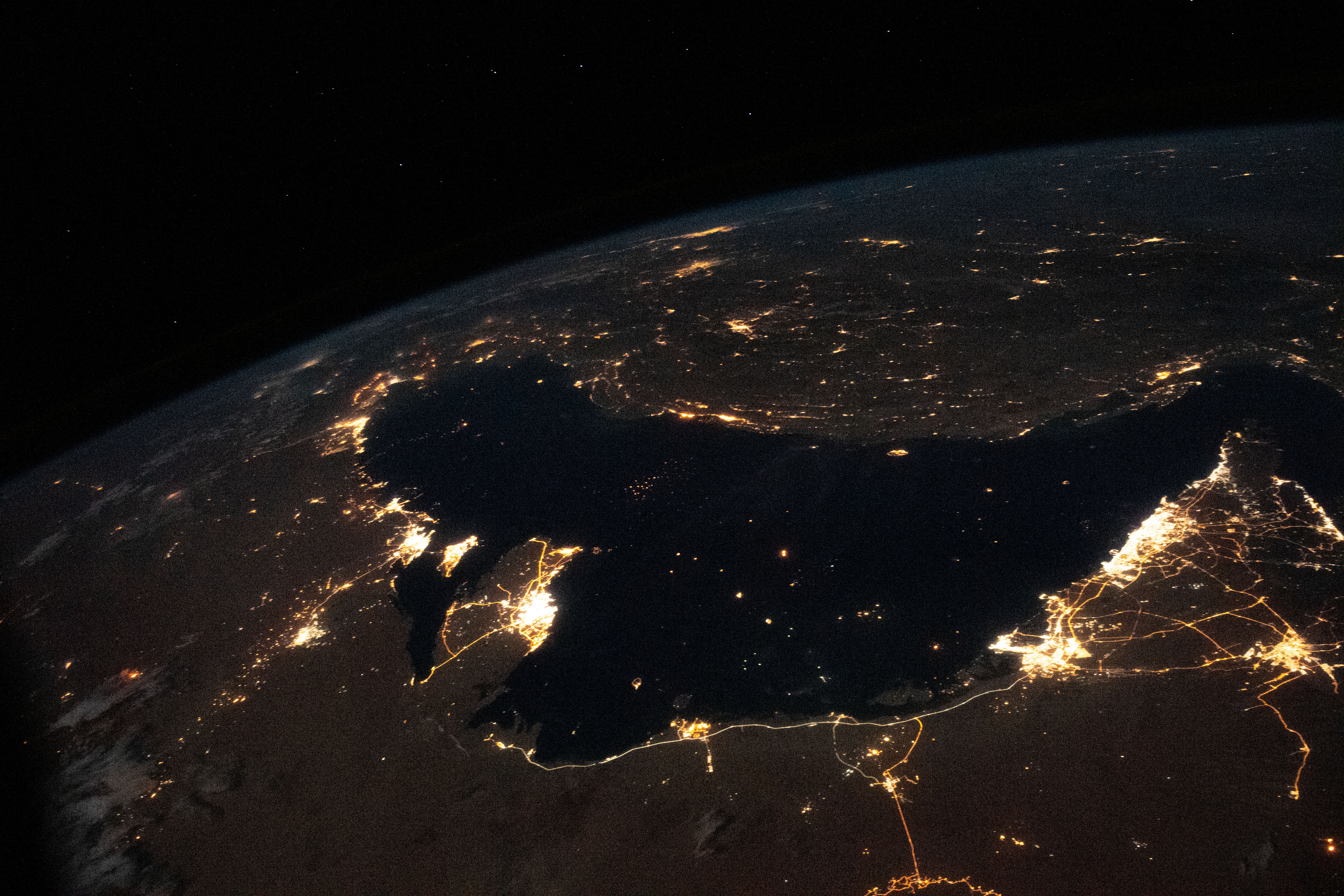
The Persian Gulf at night from the ISS, 2020.

The Persian Gulf, (Note: Persian: خلیج فارس, romanized: Xalīj-i Fârs, pronounced [xæˈliːdʒ e ˈfɒːɹs], Arabic: الخليج الفارسي) sometimes called the Arabian Gulf, (Note: Arabic: الخليج العربي, romanized: al-Khalīj al-ˁArabiyy, pronounced [al.xaˈliːdʒ al.ʕaraˈbijj, - alˈʕarabiː].) is a mediterranean sea in West Asia. The body of water is an extension of the Arabian Sea and the larger Indian Ocean located between the Arabian Peninsula and Iran (Persia). It is connected to the Gulf of Oman in the east by the Strait of Hormuz. The river delta of the Shatt al-Arab forms the north-west shoreline.

The Persian Gulf has many fishing grounds, extensive reefs (mostly rocky, but also coral), and abundant pearl oysters; however, its ecology has been damaged by industrialization and oil spills.

The Persian Gulf is in the Persian Gulf Basin, which is of Cenozoic origin and related to the subduction of the Arabian plate under the Zagros Mountains. The current flooding of the basin started 15,000 years ago due to rising sea levels of the Holocene glacial retreat.

== Geography ==
The International Hydrographic Organization defines the Persian Gulf's southern limit as "The Northwestern limit of Gulf of Oman". This limit is defined as "A line joining Ràs Limah (25°57'N) on the coast of Arabia and Ràs al Kuh (25°48'N) on the coast of Iran (Persia)".

This inland sea of some 251,000 square kilometres (96,912 sq mi) is connected to the Gulf of Oman in the east by the Strait of Hormuz. Its western end is marked by the major river delta of the Shatt al-Arab, which carries the waters of the Euphrates and the Tigris. In Iran, this is called "Arvand Rud" (lit. 'Swift River').

Its length is 989 kilometres (615 miles), with Iran covering most of the northern coast and Saudi Arabia most of the southern coast. The Persian Gulf is about 56 km (35 mi) wide at its narrowest, in the Strait of Hormuz. The waters are very shallow, with a maximum depth of 90 metres (295 feet) and an average depth of 50 metres (164 feet).

Countries with a coastline on the Persian Gulf are (clockwise, from north): Iran; Oman's Musandam exclave; the United Arab Emirates; Saudi Arabia; Qatar, on a peninsula off the Saudi coast; Bahrain, an island nation; Kuwait; and Iraq in the northwest. Various small islands also lie within the Persian Gulf, some of which are the subject of territorial disputes between the states in the region.

=== Exclusive economic zone ===
Exclusive economic zones in the Persian Gulf:

Number	Country	Area (km^{2})
1	Iran	97,860
2	United Arab Emirates	52,455
3	Saudi Arabia	33,792
4	Qatar	31,819
5	Kuwait	11,786
6	Bahrain	8,826
7	Oman	3,678
8	Iraq	540
Total	Persian Gulf	240,756

=== Coastlines ===
Countries by coastline length:

Number	Country	Length (km)
1	Iran	1,536
2	Saudi Arabia	1,300
3	United Arab Emirates	900
4	Qatar	563
5	Kuwait	499
6	Bahrain	161
7	Oman	100
8	Iraq	58
Total	Persian Gulf	5,117

=== Islands ===
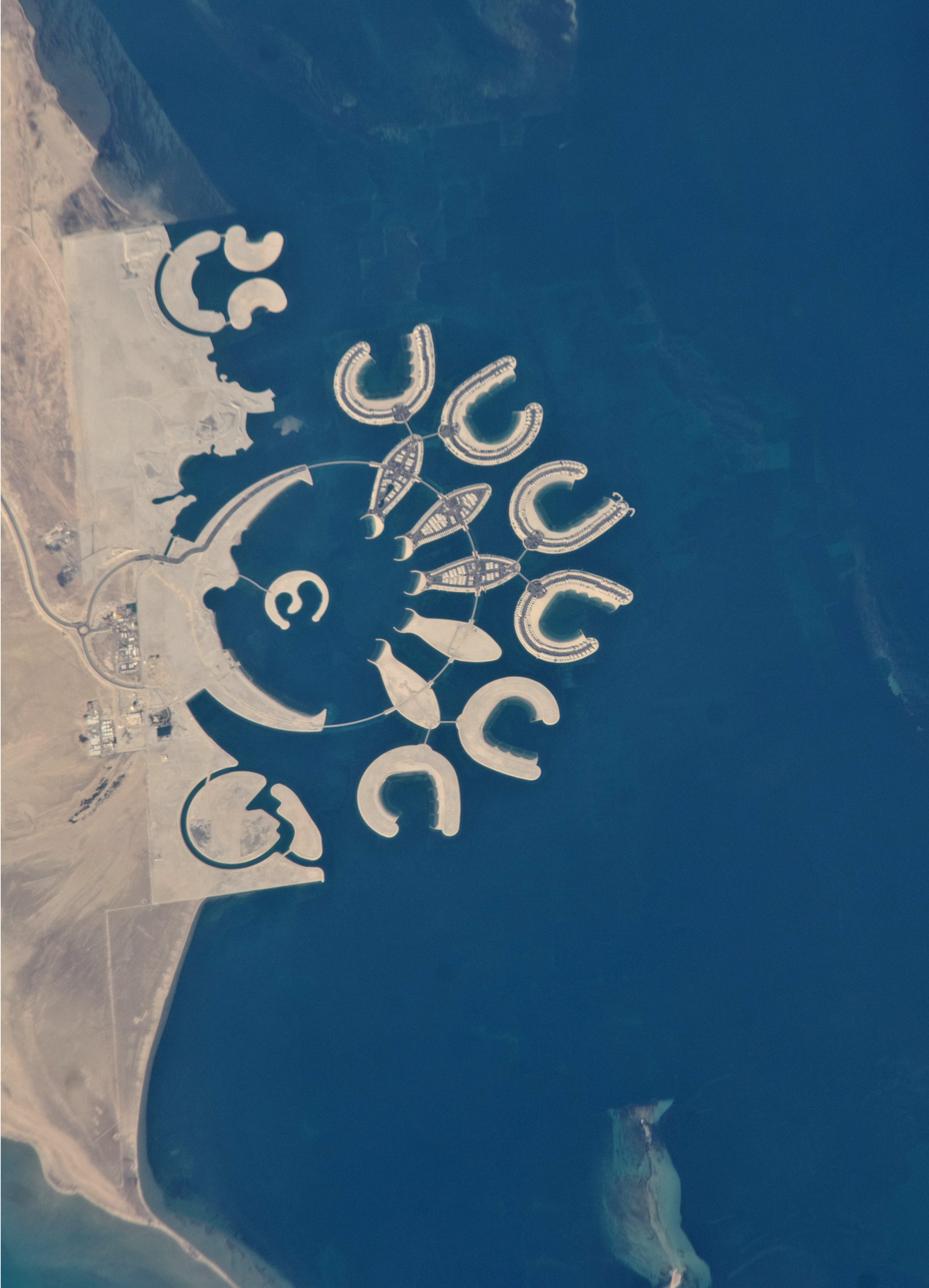
Durrat Al Bahrain from ISS, 2011

The Persian Gulf is home to many islands such as Bahrain, an Arab state. Geographically, the biggest island in the Persian Gulf is Qeshm island, belonging to Iran and located in the Strait of Hormuz. Other significant islands in the Persian Gulf include Greater Tunb, Lesser Tunb and Kish administered by Iran, Bubiyan administered by Kuwait, Tarout administered by Saudi Arabia, and Dalma administered by UAE. In recent years, there has also been the addition of artificial islands for tourist attractions, such as The World Islands in Dubai and The Pearl Island in Doha. Persian Gulf islands are often also historically significant, having been used in the past by colonial powers such as the Portuguese and the British in their trade or as acquisitions for their empires.

== Oceanography ==
The Persian Gulf is connected to the Indian Ocean through the Strait of Hormuz. Writing the water balance budget for the Persian Gulf, the inputs are river discharges from Iran and Iraq (estimated to be 2,000 cubic metres (71,000 cu ft) per second), as well as precipitation over the sea which is around 180 mm (7.1 in)/year in Qeshm Island. The evaporation rate is high, so that after considering river discharge and rain contributions, there is still a deficit of 416 cubic kilometres (100 cu mi) per year.

This difference is supplied by currents at the Strait of Hormuz. The water from the Persian Gulf has a higher salinity, and therefore exits from the bottom of the Strait, while ocean water with less salinity flows in through the top. Another study revealed the following numbers for water exchanges for the Persian Gulf: evaporation = –1.84 m (6.0 ft)/year, precipitation = 0.08 m (0.26 ft)/year, inflow from the Strait = 33.66 m (110.4 ft)/year, outflow from the Strait = -32.11 m (105.3 ft)/year, and the balance is 0 m (0 ft)/year. Data from different 3D computational fluid mechanics models, typically with spatial resolution of 3 kilometres (1.9 mi) and depth each element equal to 1–10 metres (3.3–32.8 ft) are predominantly used in computer models.

== Name ==
=== Historical names ===
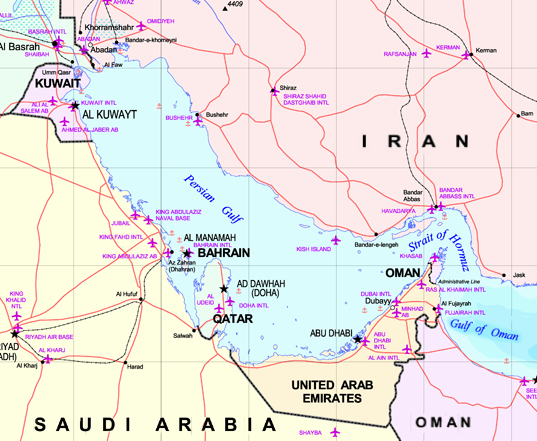
A map of the Persian Gulf. The Gulf of Oman leads to the Arabian Sea. Detail from larger map of the Middle East.

Before the adoption of the current name, the Persian Gulf was known by other names. The Assyrians called it the "Bitter Sea". In 550 BC, the Achaemenid Empire established the first ancient empire in Persis (Pars, or modern Fars, also known as Persia), in the southwestern region of the Iranian plateau. Consequently, in the Greek sources, the body of water that bordered this province came to be known as the "Persian Gulf". In the book of Nearchus known as Indikê (300 BC), the word "Persikon kolpos" is mentioned multiple times referring to the Persian Gulf.

In 550–330 BC, coinciding with the sovereignty of the Achaemenid Persian Empire over the region, the name "Persian (Pars) Sea" appears frequently in written texts.

An inscription and engraving of Darius the Great, dating to the fifth century BC states: King Darius says:

I ordered to dig this (Canal of the Pharaohs) canal from the river that is called Nile (Pirâva) and flows in Egypt (Mudrâyâ), to the sea that begins in Persia (Pârsa). Therefore, when this canal had been dug as I had ordered, ships went from Egypt through this canal to Persia, as I had intended.

— Darius I, Darius the Great's Suez Inscriptions

In the Persian Sasanian Empire (224–651 AD), the Persian Gulf was called Pūdīg, which comes from Avestan: Pūitika, lit. 'cleansing', a name mentioned in Bundahishn.

=== Modern naming dispute ===
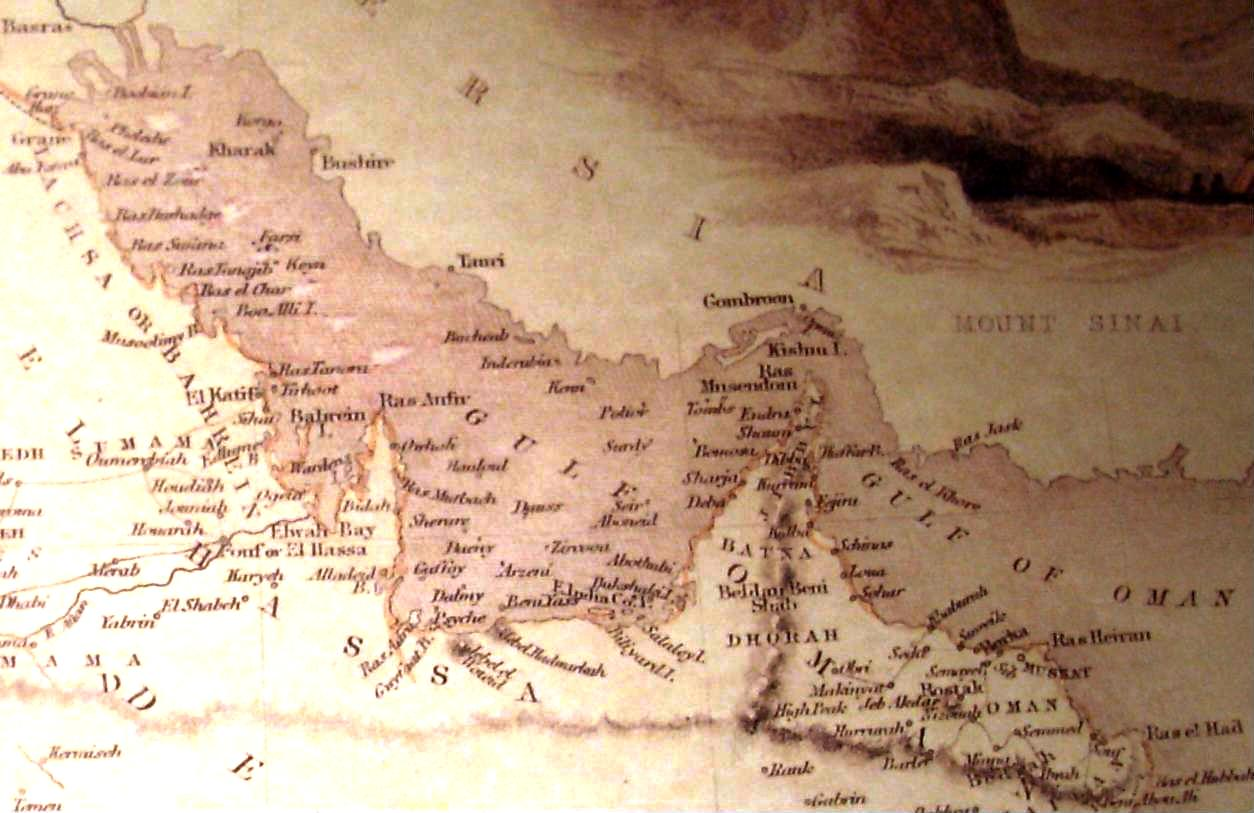
A historical map of the Persian Gulf in a Dubai museum with the word Persian censured

The body of water is historically and internationally known as the Persian Gulf. It is listed in the third edition of Limits of Oceans and Seas as "Gulf of Iran (Persian Gulf) and, as of 2002, in the draft fourth edition as "Persian Gulf". Arab governments refer to it as the Arabian Gulf or The Gulf. The name Gulf of Iran is used by the International Hydrographic Organization.

The dispute in naming has become especially prevalent since the 1960s. Rivalry between Iran and certain Arab states, along with the emergence of pan-Arabism and Arab nationalism, has seen the name "Arabian Gulf" become predominant in most Arab countries. Although historically less common, the term "Arabian Gulf" first began to be used by some Arab states during the 1950s and 1960s, at a time when Arab nationalism was at its height. Despite the dispute, Britannica notes that outside Arab states, the name “Arabian Gulf” has not received widespread recognition.

== History ==
=== Ancient history ===
The region of the Persian Gulf has been inhabited since the Paleolithic. During most of the Last Glacial Period (115,000–11,700 years Before Present), due to lowered sea levels (reaching around 125 metres (410 ft) metres below present values during the Last Glacial Maximum) combined with the shallow depth of the Gulf (on average around 35 metres (115 ft) and at max around 100 metres (330 ft) metres depth) most of the Persian Gulf was exposed as dry land, forming a flat floodplain where a number of rivers converged.

This region may have served as an environmental refuge for early humans during periodic hyperarid climate oscillations. The modern marine Gulf was formed when sea level rose during the early Holocene, from around 12,000 to 6,000 years ago. The flooding of the Gulf may have stimulated the development of Neolithic farming cultures in regions of the Middle East adjacent to the Gulf.

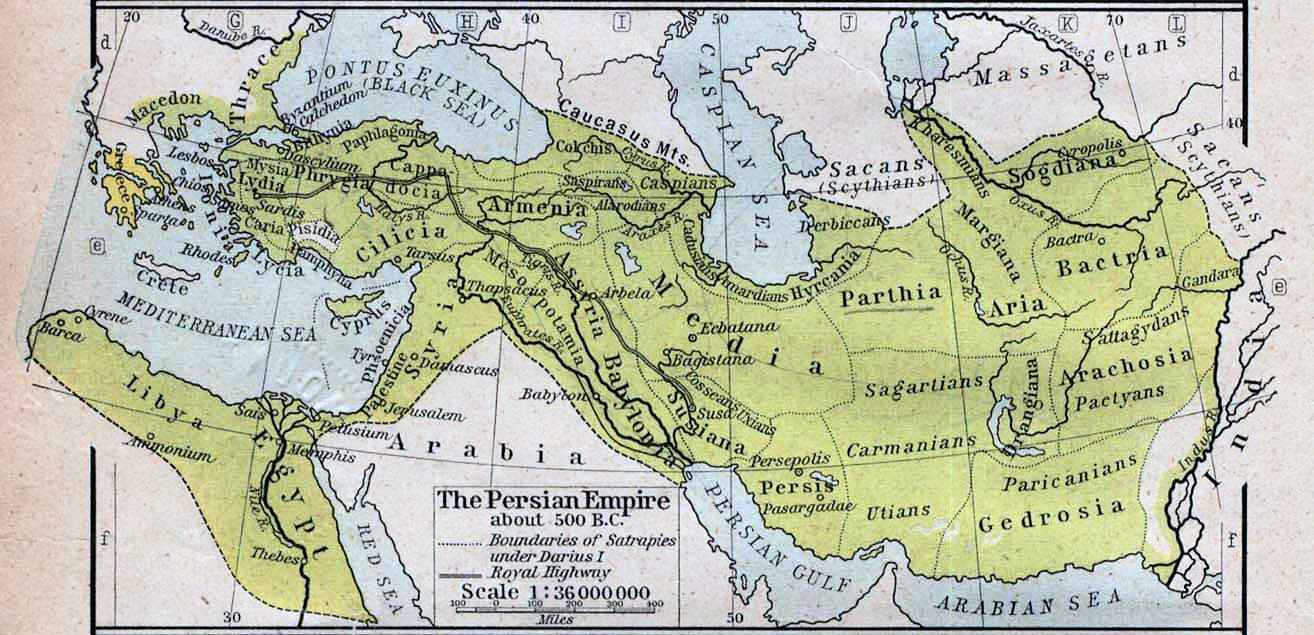
A map depicting the Achaemenid Persian Empire in relation to the Persian Gulf.

Persian Gulf, by John Friend, 1704 and by M. Bellin, 1764 - 1787, Dalrymple's charts

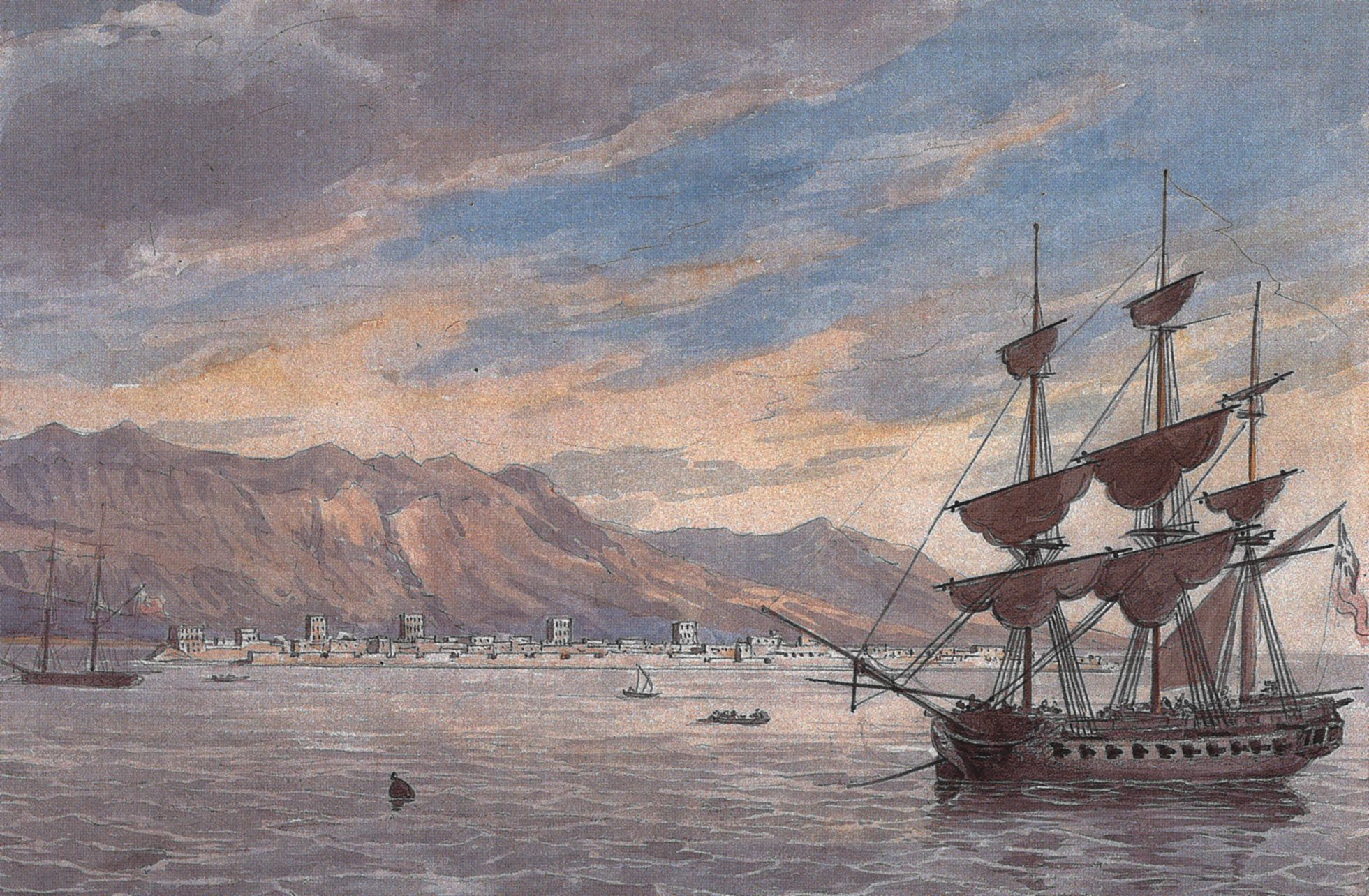
A painting depicting the British Expeditionary Force off the coast of Ras Al Khaimah in 1809.

The world's oldest known civilization (Sumer) developed along the Persian Gulf and southern Mesopotamia. The oldest evidence in the world for seagoing vessels has been found at H3 in Kuwait, dating to the mid-sixth millennium BC, when the Gulf was part of an extensive trade network that involved the Ubaid settlements in Mesopotamia and communities along the entire Gulf coast.

For most of the early history of the settlements in the Persian Gulf, the southern shores were ruled by a series of nomadic tribes. During the end of the fourth millennium BC, the southern part of the Persian Gulf was dominated by the Dilmun civilization. For a long time, the most important settlement on the southern coast of the Persian Gulf was Gerrha. In the second century the Lakhum tribe, who lived in what is now Yemen, migrated north and founded the Lakhmid Kingdom along the southern coast. Occasional ancient battles took place along the Persian Gulf coastlines, between the Sassanid Persian empire and the Lakhmid Kingdom, the most prominent of which was the invasion led by Shapur II against the Lakhmids, leading to Lakhmids' defeat, and advancement into Arabia, along the southern shorelines. During the 7th century, the Sasanian Persian empire conquered the whole of the Persian Gulf, including southern and northern shores.

Between 625 BC and 226 AD, the northern side was dominated by a succession of Persian empires including the Median, Achaemenid, Seleucid and Parthian empires. Under the leadership of the Achaemenid king Darius the Great (Darius I), Persian ships found their way to the Persian Gulf. Persians were not only stationed on islands of the Persian Gulf, but also had ships often of 100 to 200 capacity patrolling empire's various rivers including Shatt-al-Arab, Tigris, and the Nile in the west, as well as Sind waterway, in India.

The Achaemenid high naval command had established major naval bases located along Shatt al-Arab river, Bahrain, Oman, and Yemen. The Persian fleet would soon not only be used for peacekeeping purposes along the Shatt al-Arab but would also open the door to trade with India via Persian Gulf.

Following the fall of Achaemenid Empire, and after the fall of the Parthian Empire, the Sasanian Empire ruled the northern half and at times the southern half of the Persian Gulf. The Persian Gulf, along with the Silk Road, were important trade routes in the Sasanian Empire. Many of the trading ports of the Persian empires were located in or around Persian Gulf. Siraf, an ancient Sasanian port that was located on the northern shore of the Persian Gulf, located in what is now the Iranian province of Bushehr, is an example of such commercial port. Siraf, was also significant in that it had a flourishing commercial trade with China by the fourth century, having first established connection with the far east in 185 AD.

=== Colonial era ===
Portuguese influence in the Persian Gulf lasted for 250 years. Since the beginning of the 16th century, Portuguese dominance contended with the local powers and the Ottoman Empire. Following the arrival of the English and the Dutch, the Safavid Empire allied with the newcomers to contest Portuguese dominance of the seas in the 17th century.

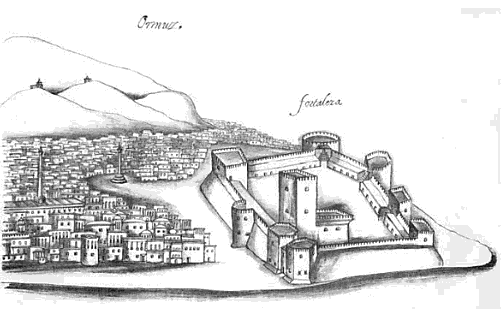
The Portuguese Castle on Hormuz Island, Gaspar Correia. "Lendas da Índia", c. 1556

Portuguese expansion into the Indian Ocean in the early 16th century following Vasco da Gama's voyages of exploration saw Afonso de Albuquerque capture the strategically located kingdom of Hormuz. The Portuguese fought the Ottomans in the Persian Gulf. In 1521, a Portuguese force led by commander Antonio Correia invaded Bahrain to take control of the wealth created by its pearl industry. On 29 April 1602, Shāh Abbās, the Persian emperor of the Safavid Persian Empire, expelled the Portuguese from Bahrain, and that date is commemorated as Persian Gulf National Day in Iran. With the support of the British fleet, in 1622 'Abbās took the island of Hormuz from the Portuguese; much of the trade was diverted to the town of Bandar 'Abbās, which he had taken from the Portuguese in 1615 and had named after himself. The Persian Gulf was therefore opened to a flourishing commerce with the Portuguese, Dutch, French, and British merchants, who were granted particular privileges.

The Ottoman Empire reasserted itself into Eastern Arabia in 1871. Under military and political pressure from the governor of the Ottoman Vilayet of Baghdad, Midhat Pasha, the ruling Al Thani tribe submitted peacefully to Ottoman rule. The Ottomans were forced to withdraw from the area with the start of World War I and the need for troops in various other frontiers.

In World War II and following the Anglo-Soviet invasion of Iran, the Western Allies used Iran as a conduit to transport military and industrial supply to the USSR, through a pathway known historically as the "Persian Corridor". Britain utilized the Persian Gulf as the entry point for the supply chain in order to make use of the Trans-Iranian Railway. The Persian Gulf therefore became a critical maritime path through which the Allies transported equipment to Soviet Union against the Nazi invasion.

The piracy in the Persian Gulf was prevalent until the 19th century. Many of the most notable historical instances of piracy were perpetrated by the Al Qasimi tribe. This led to the British mounting the Persian Gulf campaign of 1819. The campaign led to the signing of the General Maritime Treaty of 1820 between the British and the Sheikhs of what was then known as the "Pirate Coast". From 1763 until 1971, the British Empire maintained varying degrees of political control over some of the Persian Gulf states, including the United Arab Emirates (originally called the Trucial States) and at various times Bahrain, Kuwait, Oman, and Qatar through the British Residency of the Persian Gulf.

=== Modern history ===
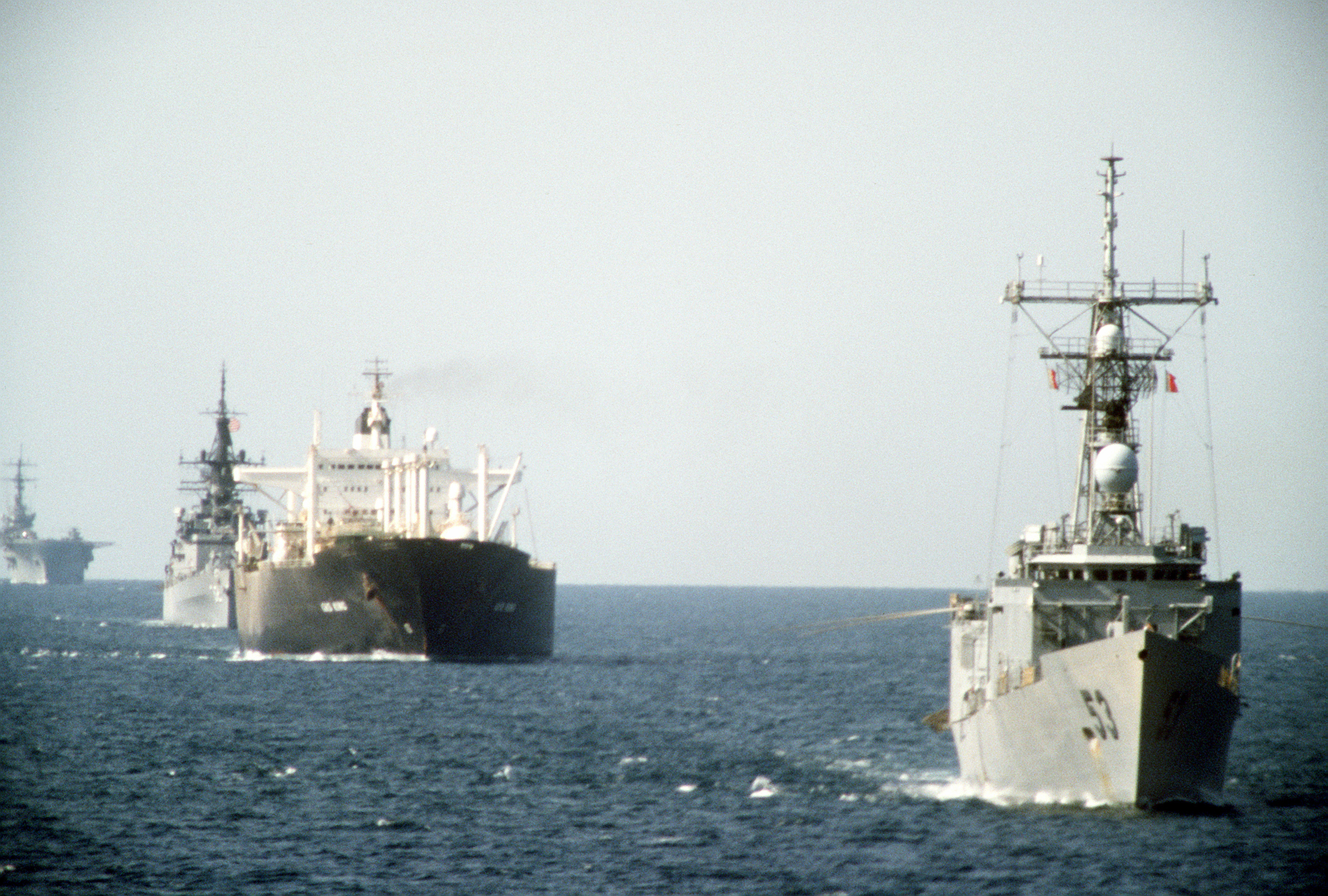
Operation Earnest Will: Tanker convoy No. 12 under US Navy escort in October 1987

The Persian Gulf was a battlefield of the 1980–1988 Iran–Iraq War, in which each side attacked the other's oil tankers. It is the namesake of the 1991 Gulf War, the largely air- and land-based conflict that followed Iraq's invasion of Kuwait. The United States' role in the Persian Gulf grew in the second half of the 20th century. On 3 July 1988, Iran Air Flight 655 was shot down by the U.S. military (which had mistaken the Airbus A300 operating the flight for an Iranian F-14 Tomcat) while it was flying over the Persian Gulf, killing all 290 people on board. The United Kingdom maintains a profile in the region; in 2006 alone, over 1 million British nationals visited Dubai. In 2018, the UK opened a permanent military base, HMS Jufair, in the Persian Gulf, the first since it withdrew from East of Suez in 1971 and is developing a support facility in Oman.

== Cities and population ==
Eight nations have coasts along the Persian Gulf: Bahrain, Iran, Iraq, Kuwait, Oman, Qatar, Saudi Arabia, and the United Arab Emirates. The Persian Gulf's strategic location has made it an ideal place for human development over time. Today, many major cities of the Middle East are located in this region.

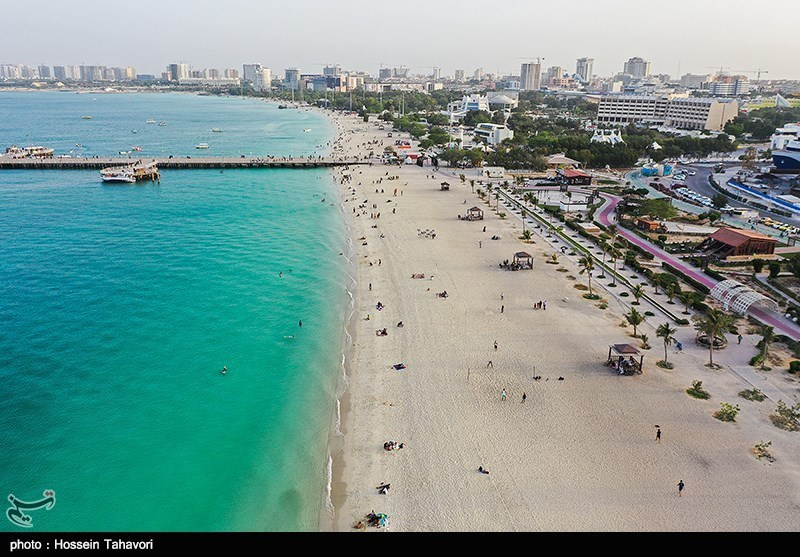
Kish island, Iran

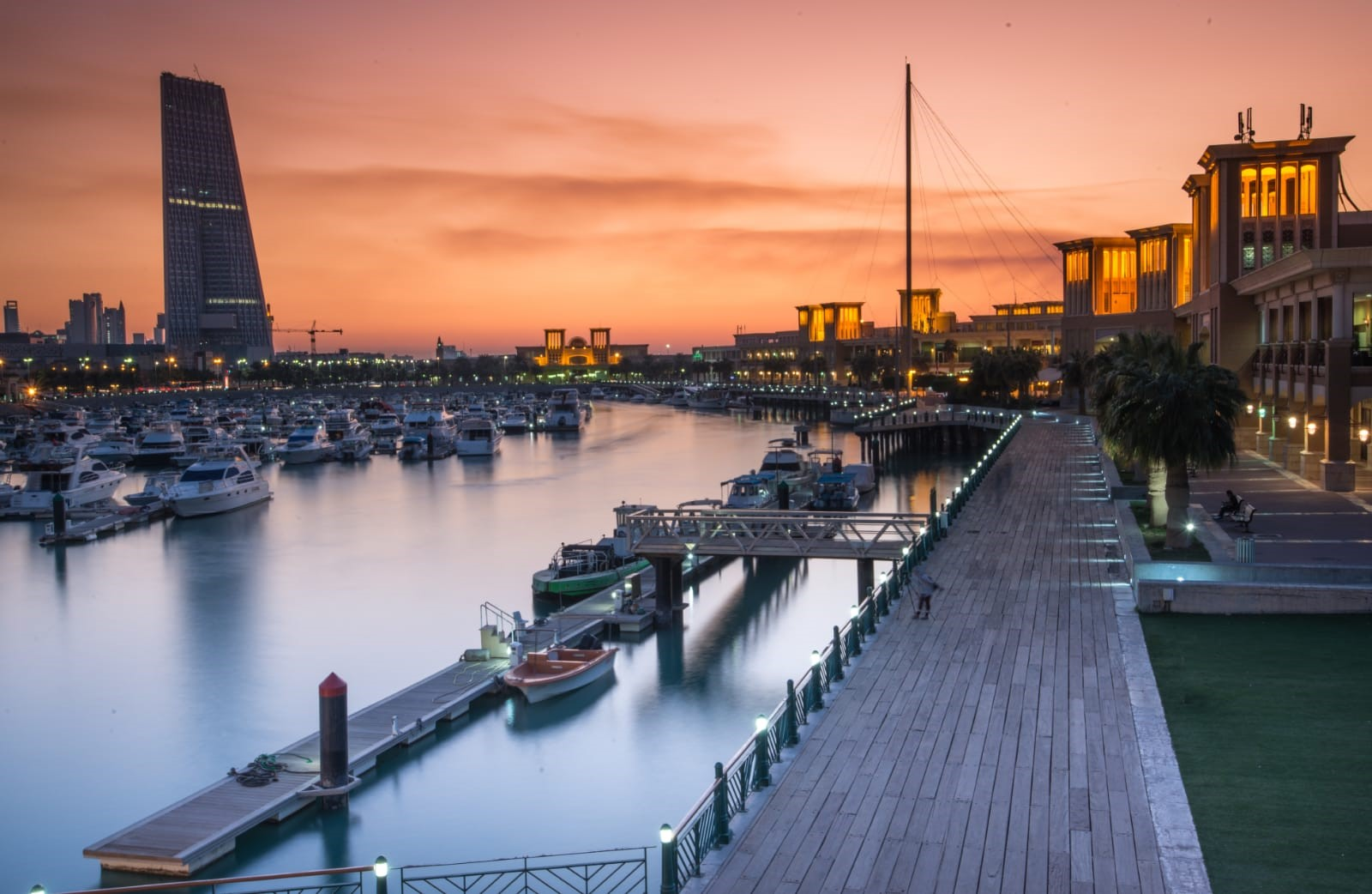
Kuwait City, Kuwait

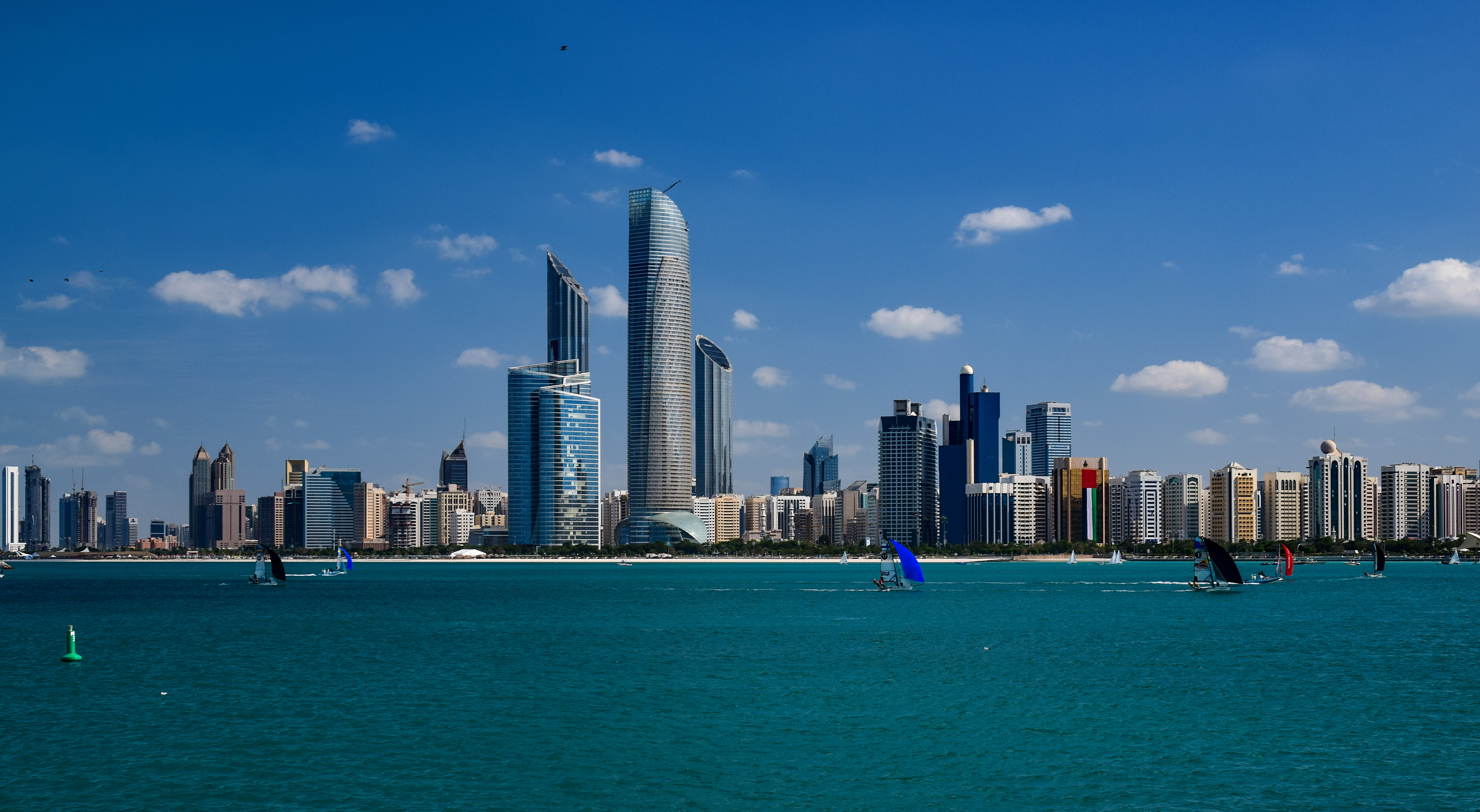
Abu Dhabi, UAE

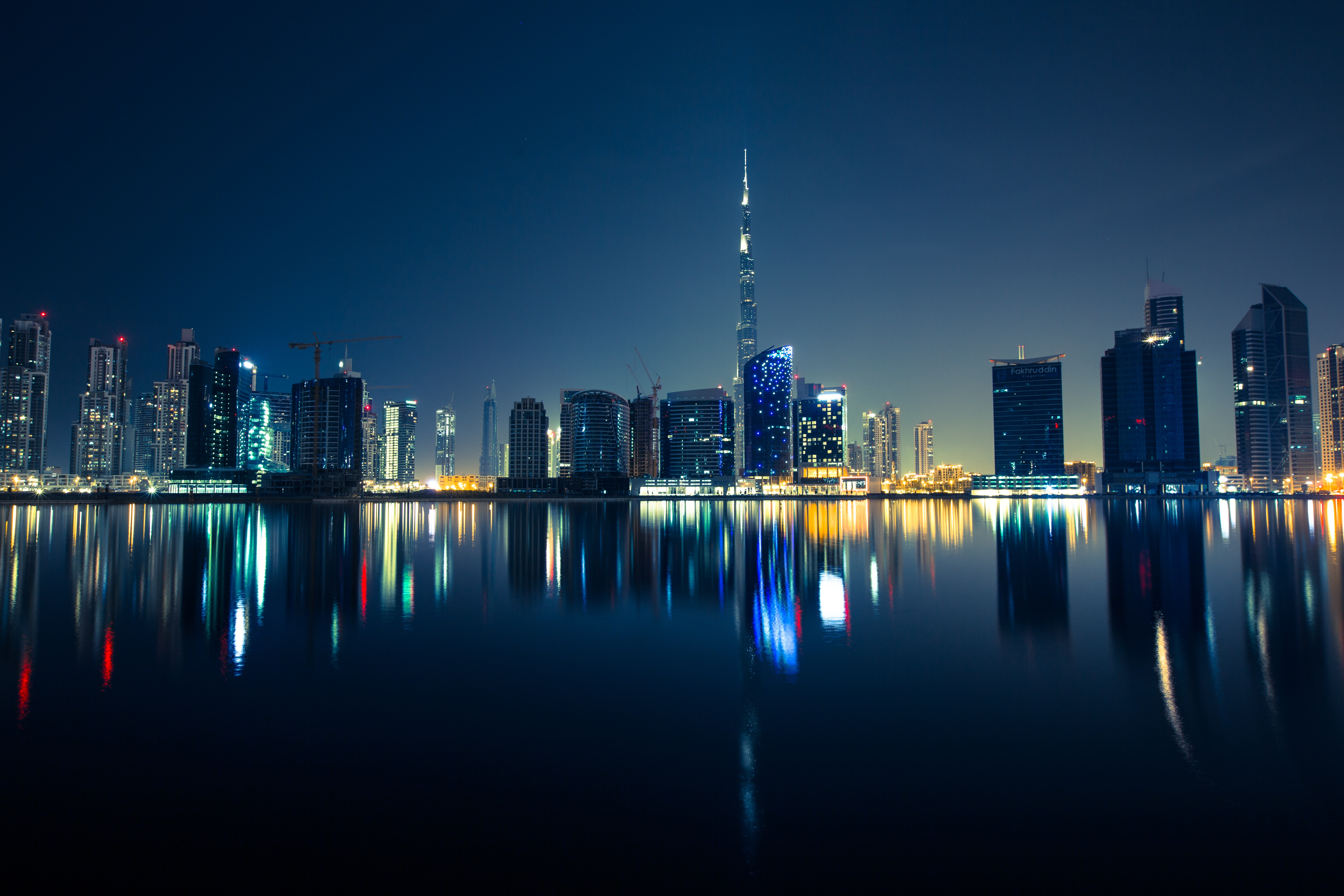
Dubai, UAE

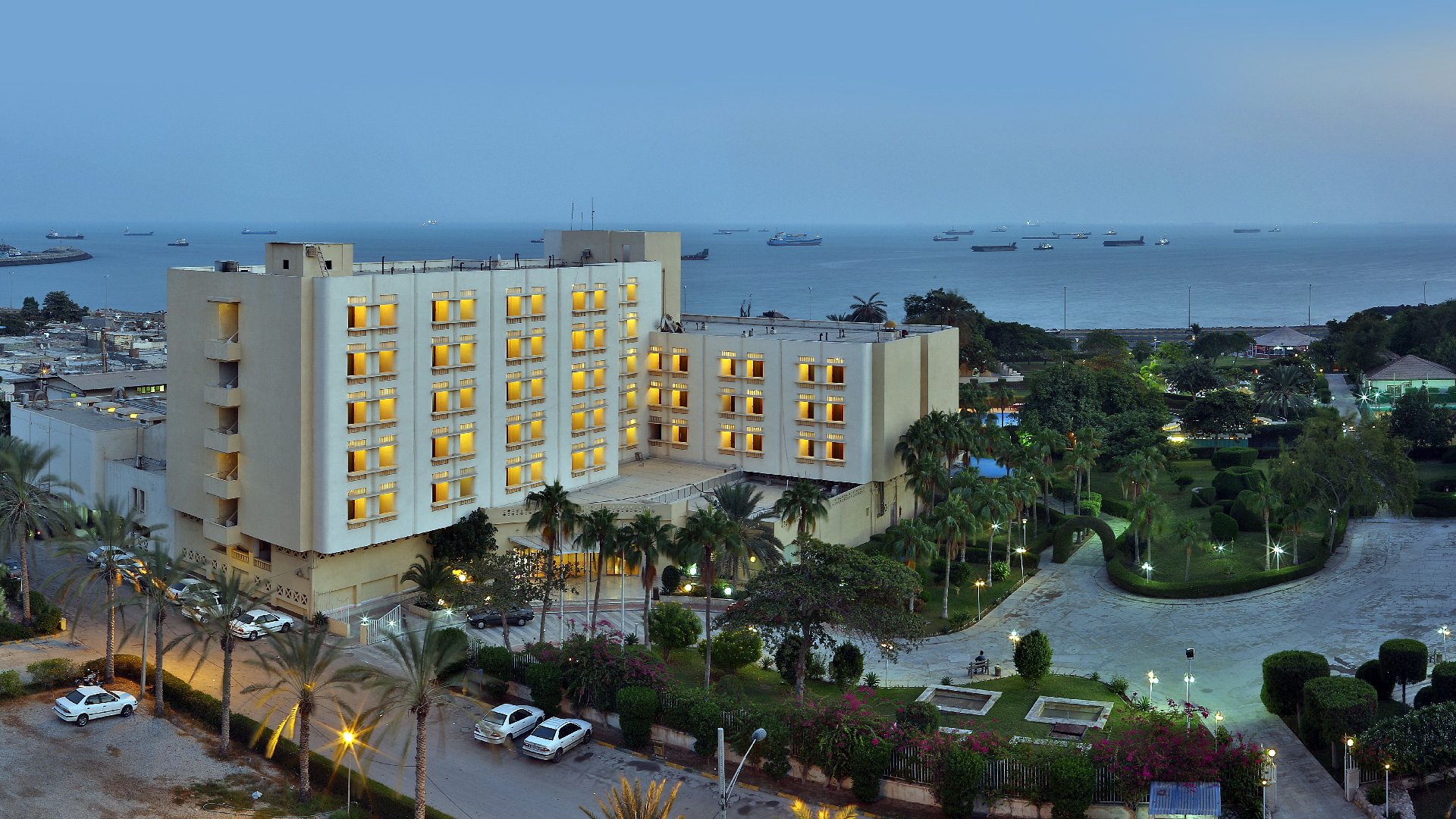
Bandar Abbas, Iran

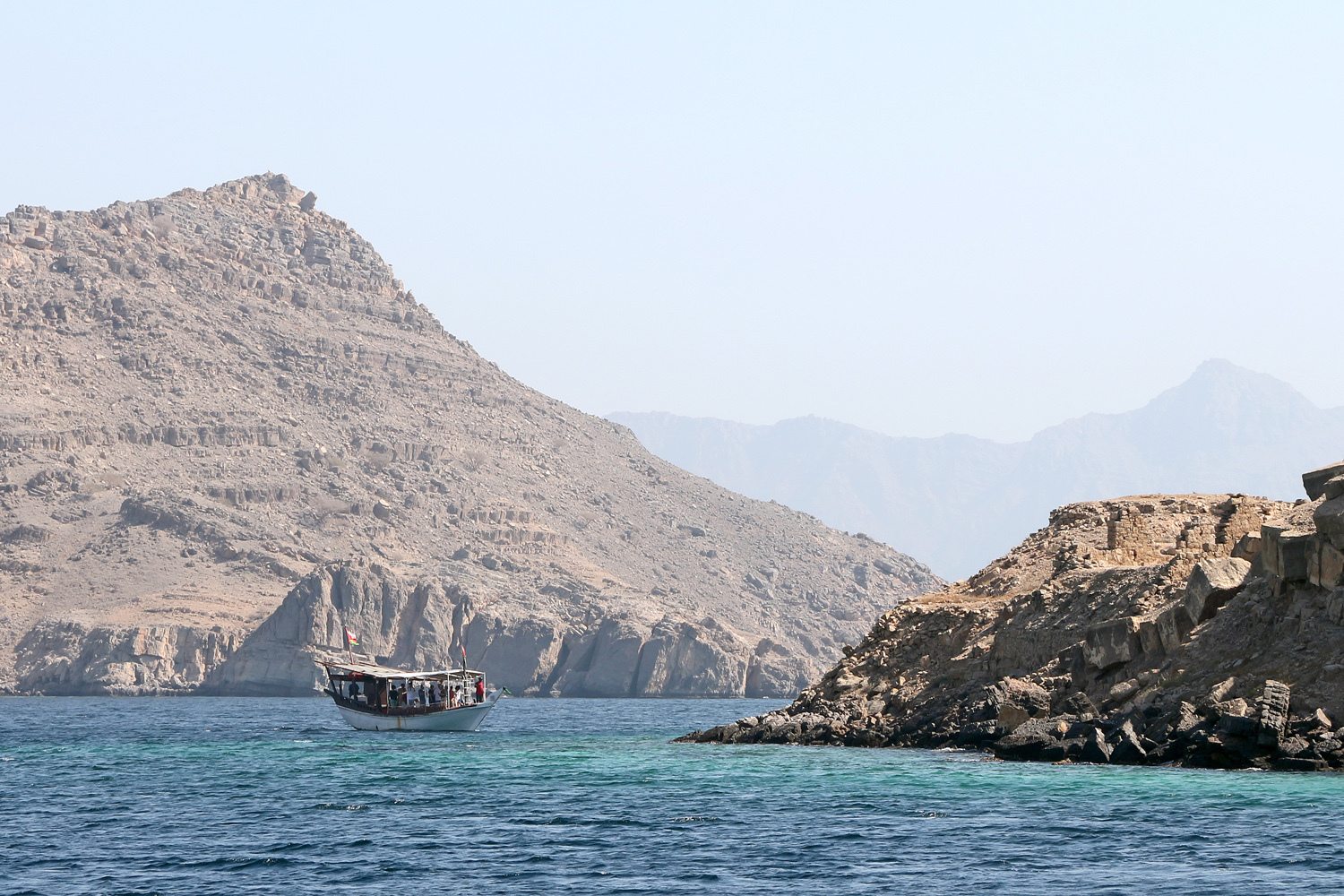
Khasab, Musandam, Oman

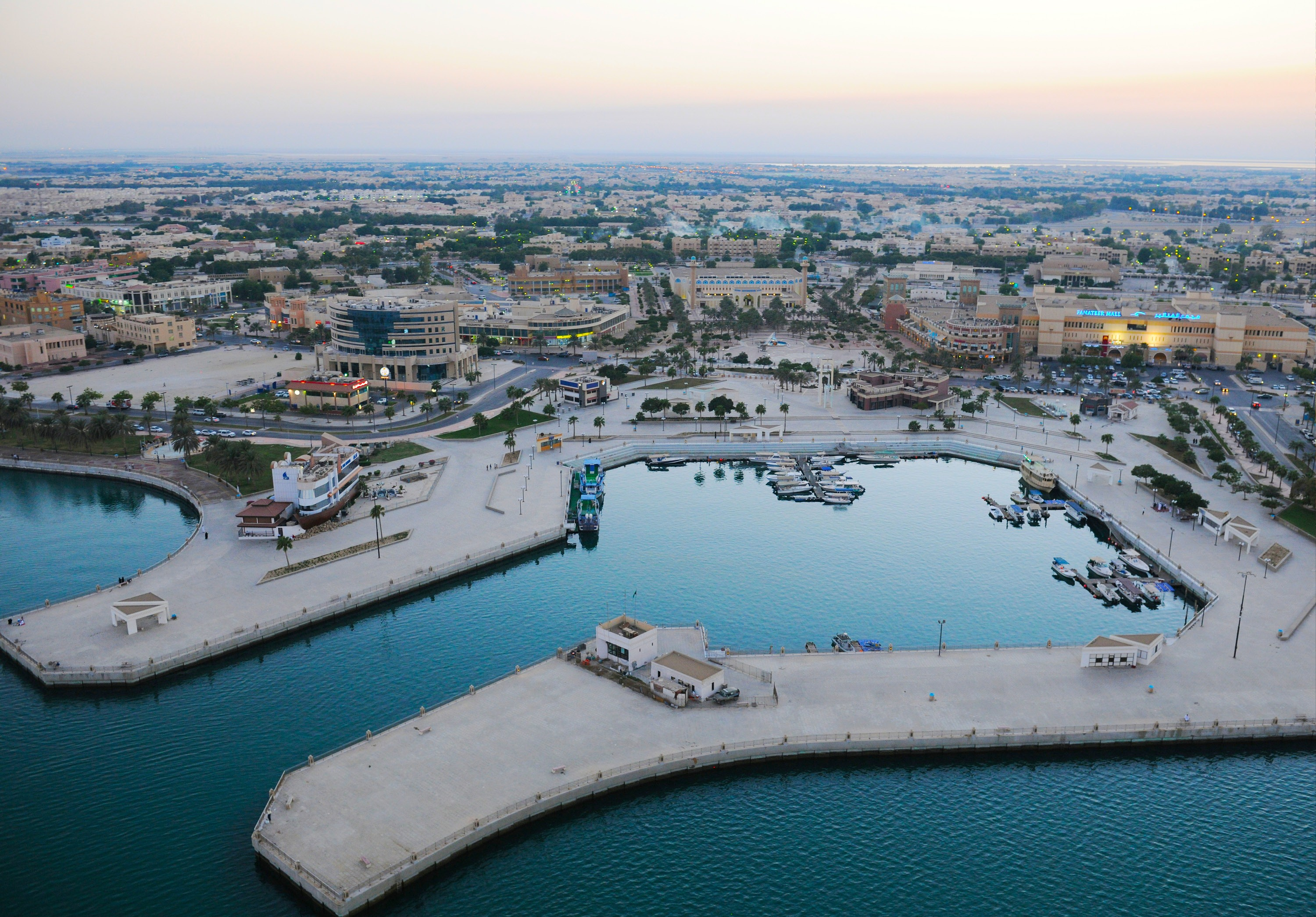
Jubail, Saudi Arabia

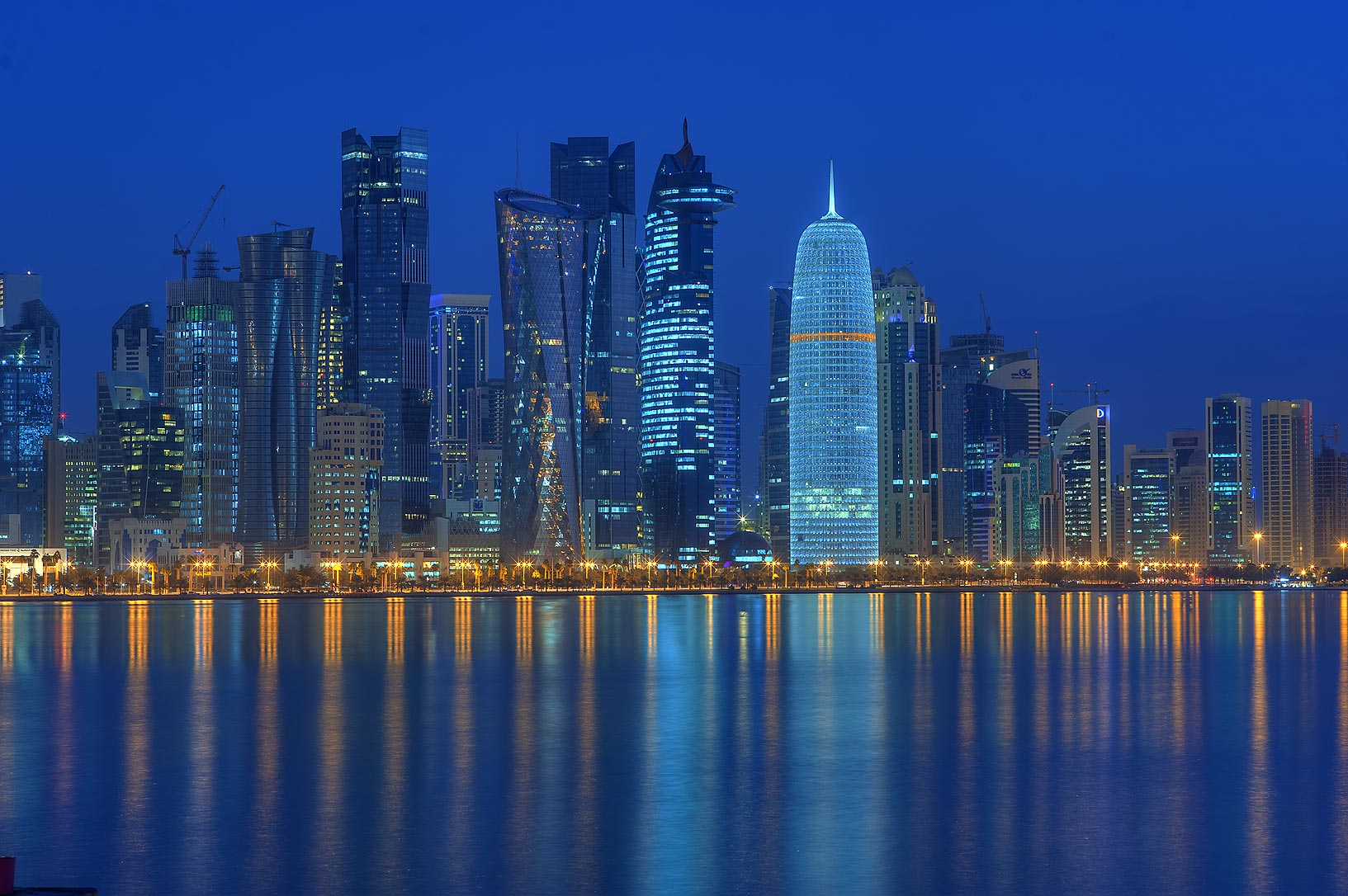
Doha, Qatar

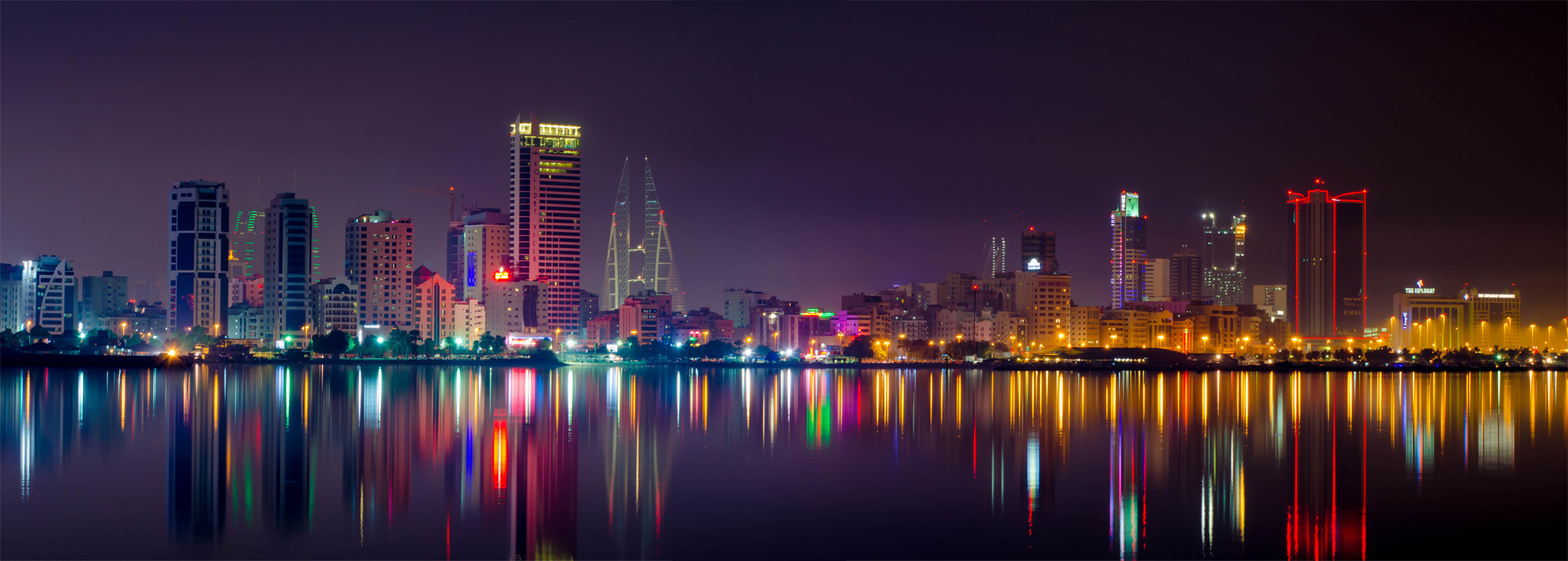
Manama, Bahrain

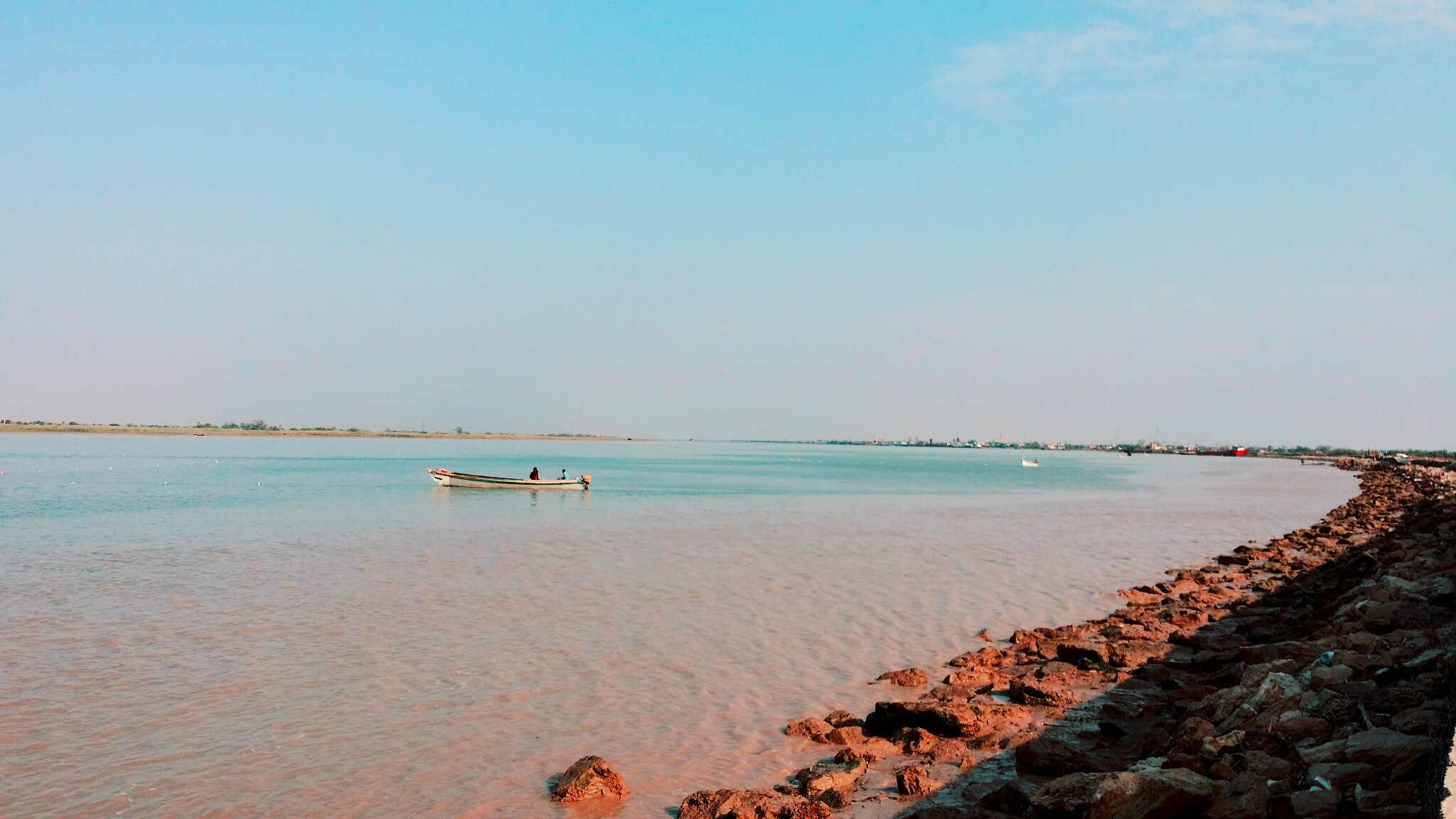
Al-Faw, Iraq

== Wildlife ==
The wildlife of the Persian Gulf is diverse, and entirely unique because of the Persian Gulf's geographic distribution and its isolation from the international waters only breached by the narrow Strait of Hormuz. The Persian Gulf has hosted some of the most magnificent marine fauna and flora, some of which are near extirpation or at serious environmental risk. From corals, to dugongs, Persian Gulf is a diverse cradle for many species who depend on each other for survival. However, the Persian Gulf is not as biologically diverse as the Red Sea.

Overall, the wildlife of the Persian Gulf is endangered from both global factors, and regional, local negligence. Most pollution is from ships; land generated pollution counts as the second most common source of pollution.

=== Aquatic mammals ===
Along the mediterranean regions of the Arabian Sea, including the Persian Gulf, the Red Sea, the Gulf of Kutch, the Gulf of Suez, the Gulf of Aqaba, the Gulf of Aden, and the Gulf of Oman, dolphins and finless porpoises are the most common marine mammals, while larger whales and orcas are rarer today. Historically, whales had been abundant in the Persian Gulf before commercial hunting wiped them out. Whales were reduced even further by illegal mass hunts by the Soviet Union and Japan in the 1960s and 1970s.

Along with Bryde's whales, these once common mammals can be seen in deeper marginal seas such as Gulf of Aden, Israel coasts, and in the Strait of Hormuz. Other species, such as the critically endangered Arabian humpback whale, (also historically common in Gulf of Aden and increasingly sighted in the Red Sea since 2006, including in the Gulf of Aqaba), omura's whale, minke whale, and orca also swim into the Persian Gulf.

Many other large species such as blue whale, sei, and sperm whales were once migrants into the Gulf of Oman and in deeper coastal waters, and still migrate into the Red Sea, but are seen mainly in the deeper water of outer seas. In 2017, it was found that the Persian Gulf alongside Abu Dhabi had the world's largest population of Indo-Pacific humpbacked dolphins.

The dolphins that live in the Persian Gulf in northern waters around Iran are also at risk. Research show that dolphins are at danger of entrapment in purse seine fishing nets and exposure to pollution from oil, sewage, and industrial run offs.

The dugong (Dugong dugon) can be found in the Persian Gulf. Their diet of sea grass has been impacted by developments along the Persian Gulf coastline, particularly the construction of artificial islands by Arab states and pollution from oil spills caused during the "Persian Gulf war" and other natural and artificial causes. Uncontrolled hunting has also had a negative impact on the survival of dugongs. The waters off Qatar, Bahrain, UAE, and Saudi Arabia are the dugongs second most important habitat (after Australia), with around 7,500 dugongs. The number of dugongs is dwindling, and it is unknown how many there are or their reproductive trend.

=== Birds ===
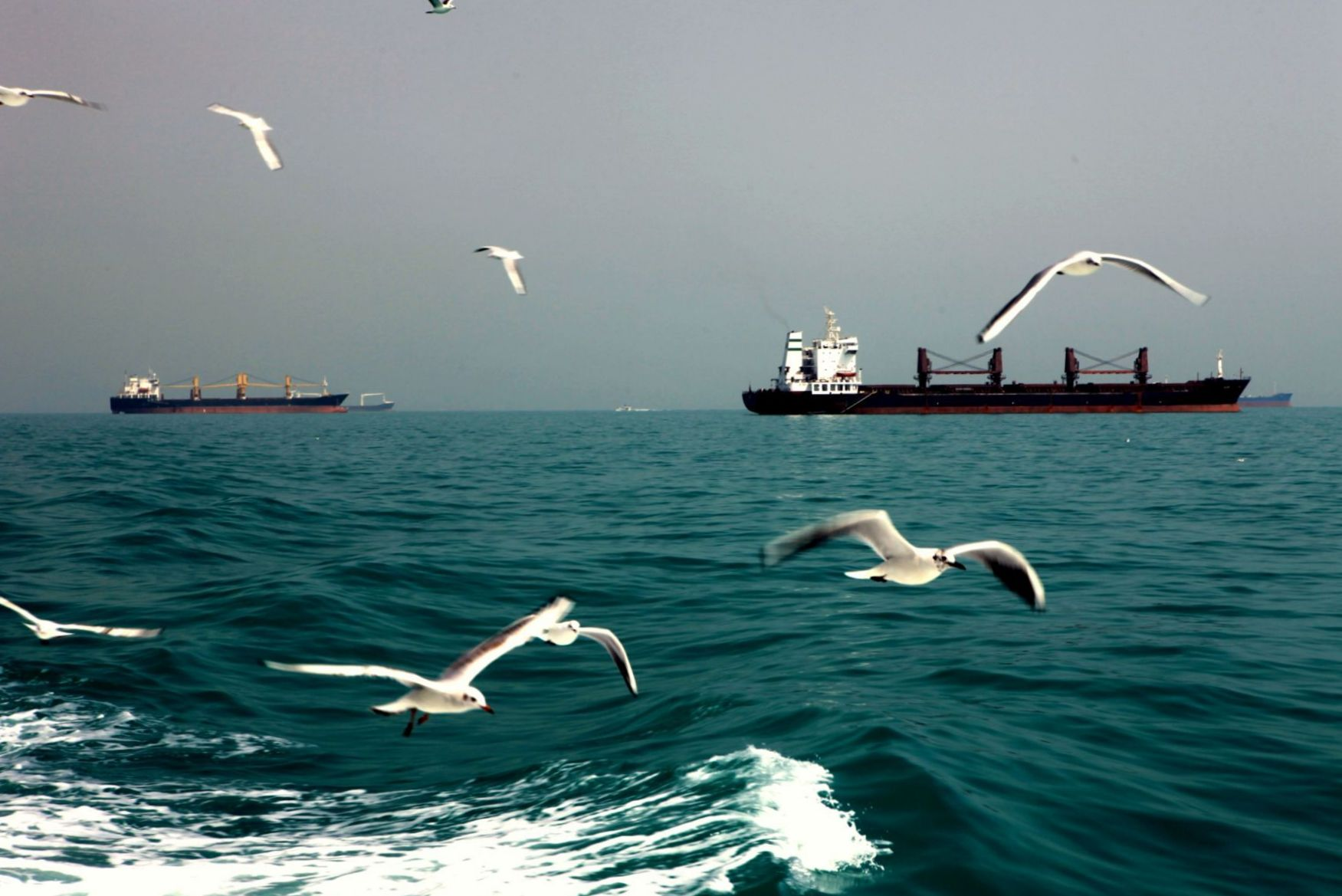
Birds in the Persian Gulf Near Hormuz Island

The Persian Gulf is home to many migratory and local birds. Concerns regarding the endangerment of the kalbaensis subspecies of the collared kingfishers were raised by conservationists over real estate development by the United Arab Emirates and Oman. Estimates from 2006 showed that only three viable nesting sites were available for this bird, one 80 miles (129 km) from Dubai, and two smaller sites in Oman.

A UN plan to protect the mangroves as a biological reserve was ignored by the emirate of Sharjah, which allowed the dredging of a channel that bisects the wetland and construction of an adjacent concrete walkway. Environmental watchdogs in Arabia are few, and those that advocate for wildlife are often silenced or ignored by developers of real estate many of whom have governmental connections.

Real estate development in the Persian Gulf by the United Arab Emirates and Oman has raised concerns that the habitats of species such as the greater flamingo, and booted warbler may be destroyed.

A 2009 study of ten Iranian islands in the Persian Gulf recorded more than 100,000 breeding pairs of waterbirds from 11 species, including the bridled tern (Sterna anaethetus), lesser crested tern (Thalasseus bengalensis), and crab plover (Dromas ardeola). These islands provide critical nesting habitat, and fluctuations in seabird populations have been proposed as biological indicators of regional ecological health.

=== Fish and reefs ===
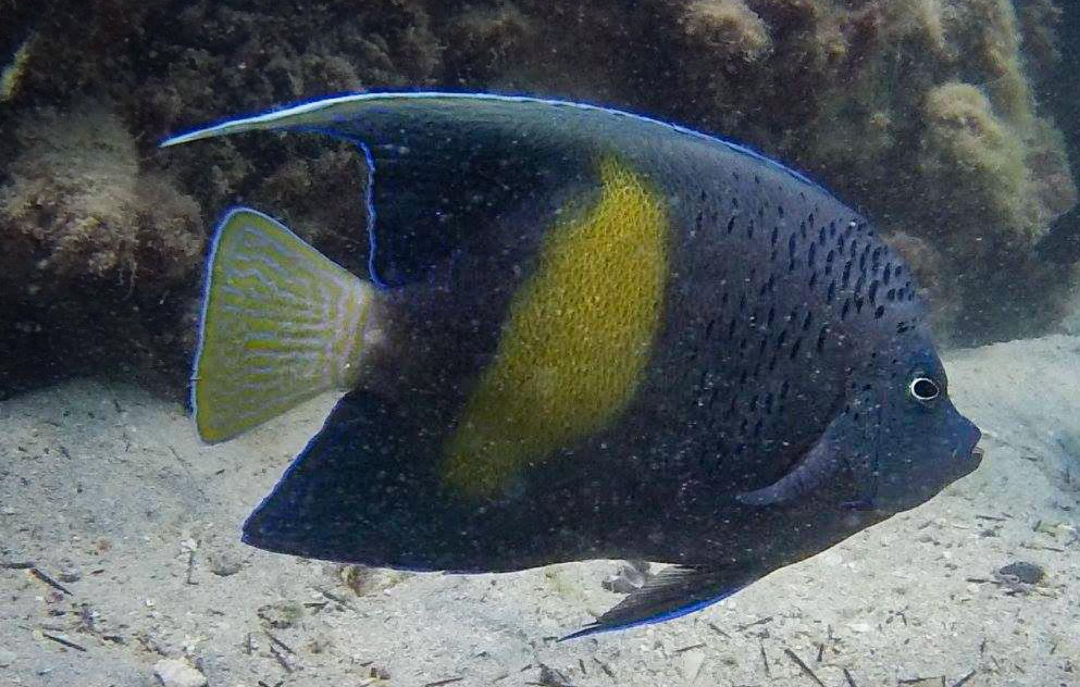
A Yellowbar Angelfish (Pomacanthus maculosus) from Dubai-Jumeirah Sea, UAE

The Persian Gulf is home to over 700 species of fish, most of which are native. Of these, more than 80% are reef associated. These reefs are primarily rocky, but compared to the Red Sea, the coral reefs in the Persian Gulf are relatively few and far between. This is primarily connected to the influx of major rivers, especially the Shatt al-Arab (Euphrates and Tigris), which carry large amounts of sediment (most reef-building corals require strong light) and causes relatively large variations in temperature and salinity (corals in general are poorly suited to large variations). Nevertheless, coral reefs have been found along sections of coast of all countries in the Persian Gulf. Corals are vital ecosystems that support multitude of marine species, and whose health directly reflects the health of the Persian Gulf. Recent years have seen a drastic decline in the coral population in the Persian Gulf, partially owing to global warming but mostly to dumping by Arab states like the UAE and Bahrain. Construction garbage such as tires, cement and chemical by-products have found their way to the Persian Gulf in recent years. Aside from direct damage to the coral, the construction waste creates "traps" for marine life in which they are trapped and die. The result has been a dwindling population of the coral, and as a result a decrease in number of species that rely on the corals for their survival.

=== Flora ===
The mangroves in the Persian Gulf require tidal flow and a combination of fresh and salt water for growth, and act as nurseries for many crabs, small fish, and insects, which are the source of food for many marine birds. Mangroves are a diverse group of shrubs and trees belonging to the genus Avicennia or Rhizophora that flourish in the salt water shallows of the Persian Gulf, and are the most important habitats for small crustaceans that dwell in them. They are as crucial an indicator of biological health on the surface of the water. Mangroves' ability to survive the salt water through intricate molecular mechanisms, their unique reproductive cycle, and their ability to grow in the most oxygen-deprived waters have allowed them extensive growth in hostile areas of the Persian Gulf. However, with the advent of artificial island development, much of their habitat is being destroyed, or occupied by man-made structures. This has had a negative impact on the crustaceans that rely on the mangrove, and in turn on the species that feed on them.

=== Gallery ===
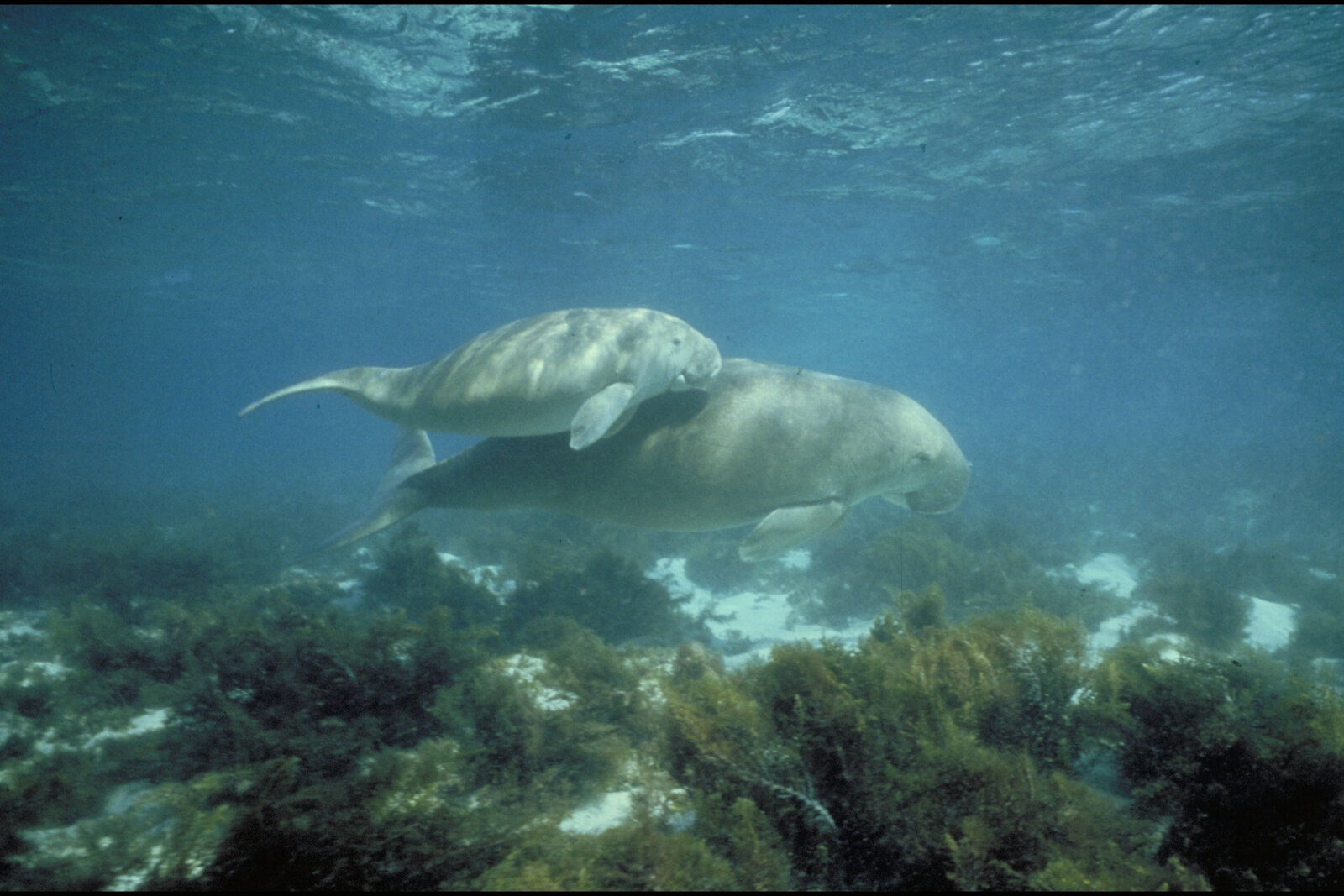
Dugong mother and her offspring in shallow water

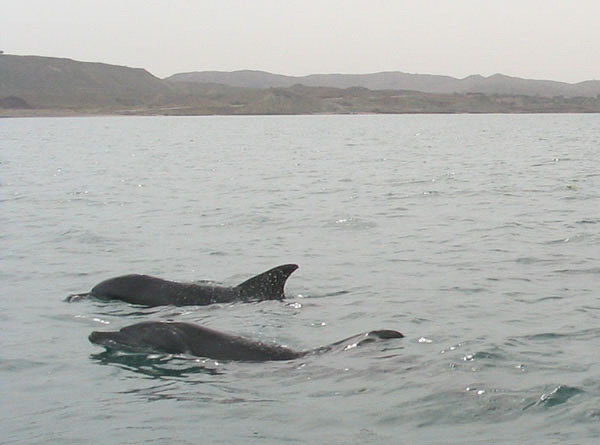
Indo-Pacific bottlenose dolphins off the southern shore of Iran, around Hengam Island

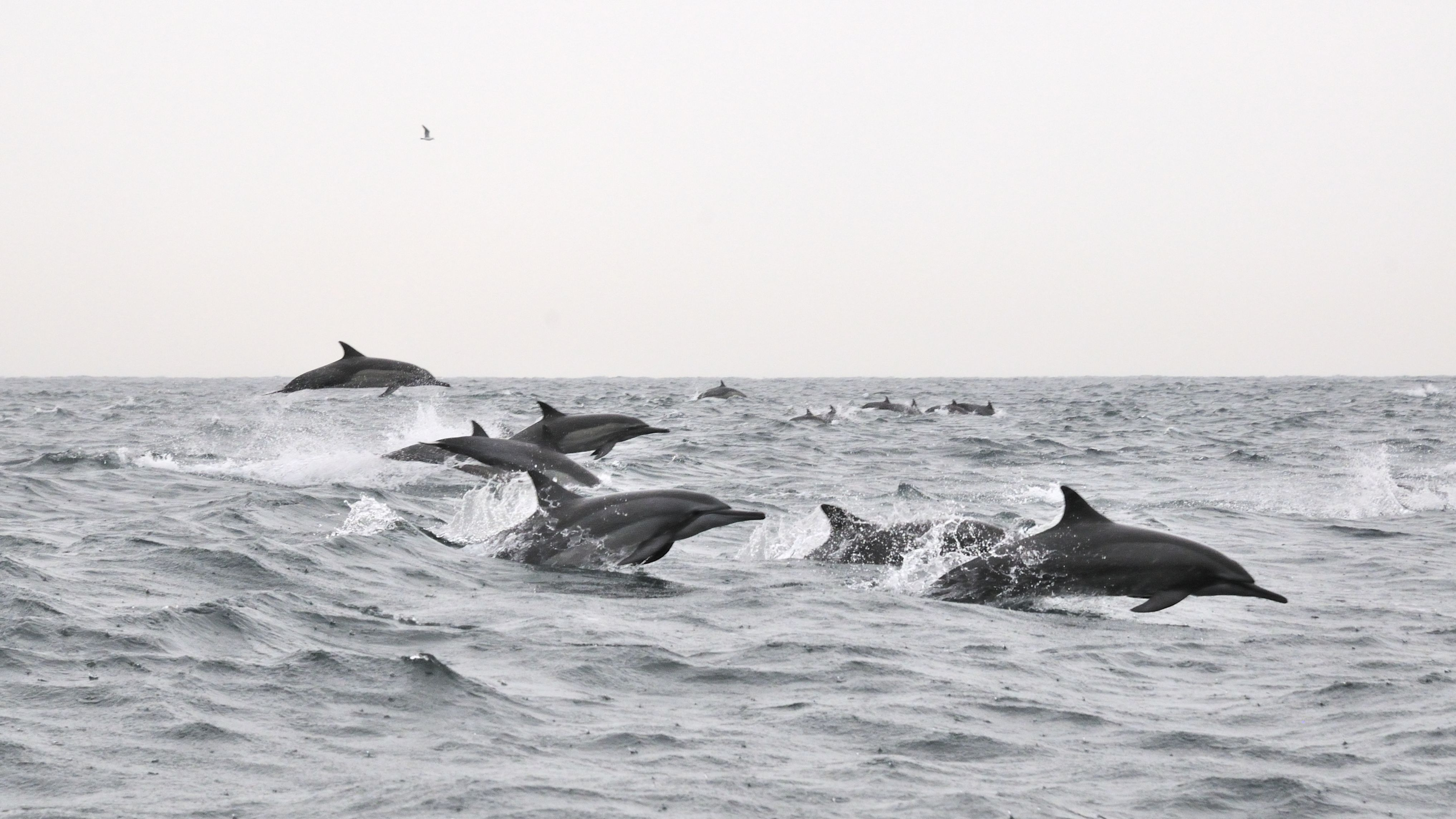
Spinner dolphins leaping in the Persian Gulf

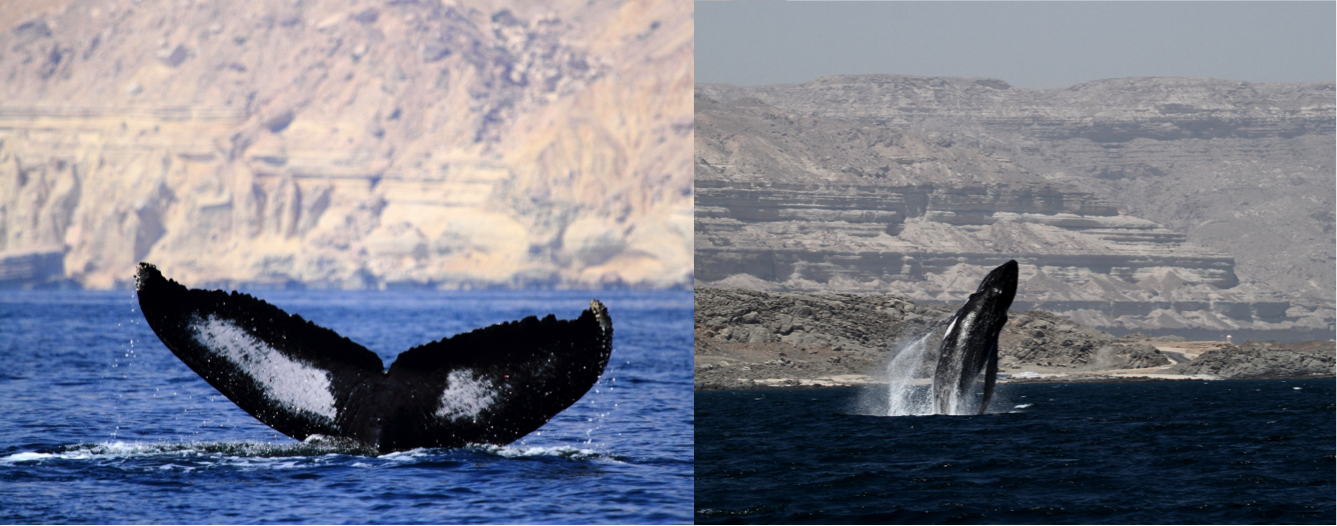
Critically endangered Arabian humpback whales (being the most isolated, and the only resident population in the world) off Dhofar, Oman

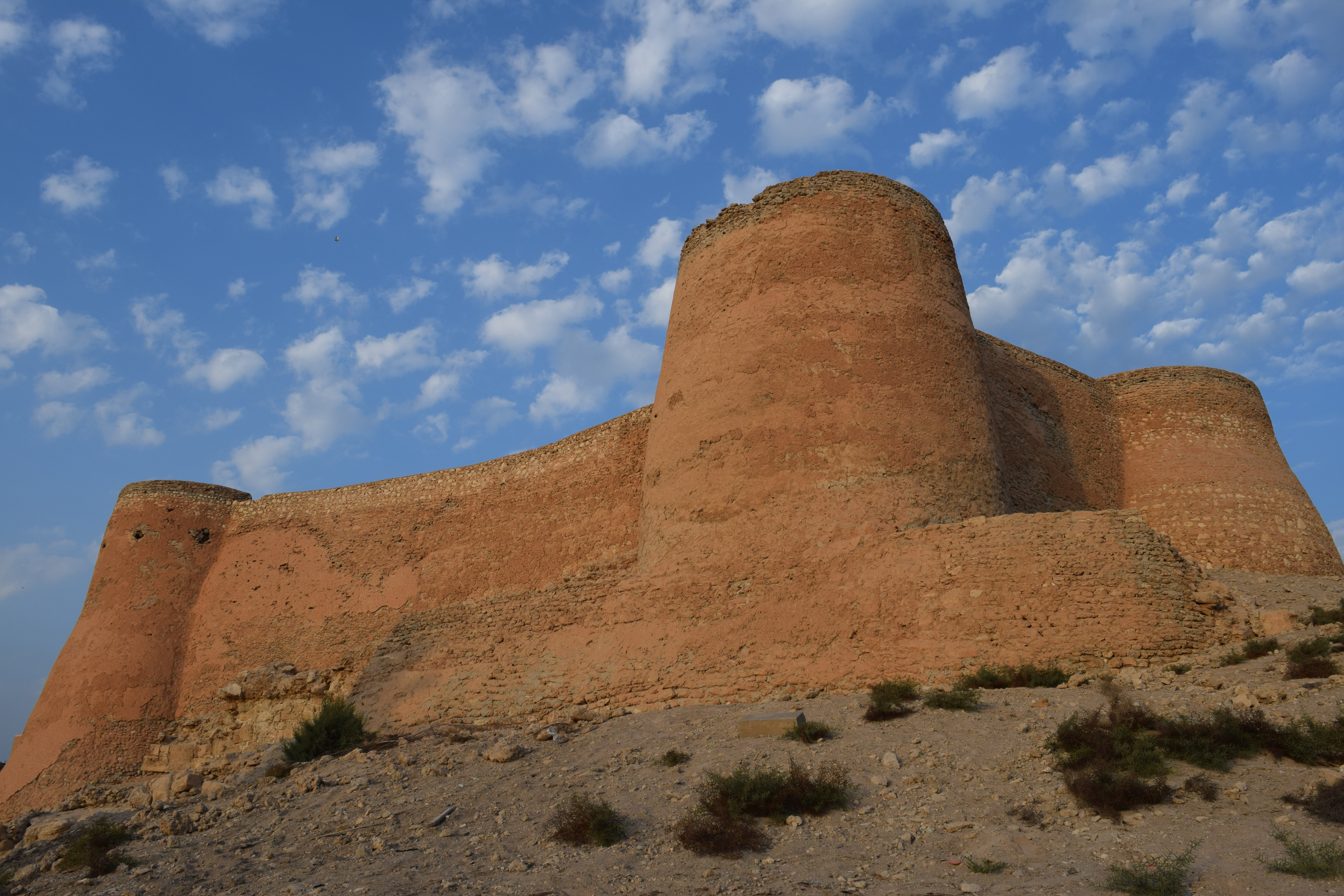
Tarout Castle on Tarout Island in the Eastern Province of Saudi Arabia.

== Exports ==
=== Oil and gas ===
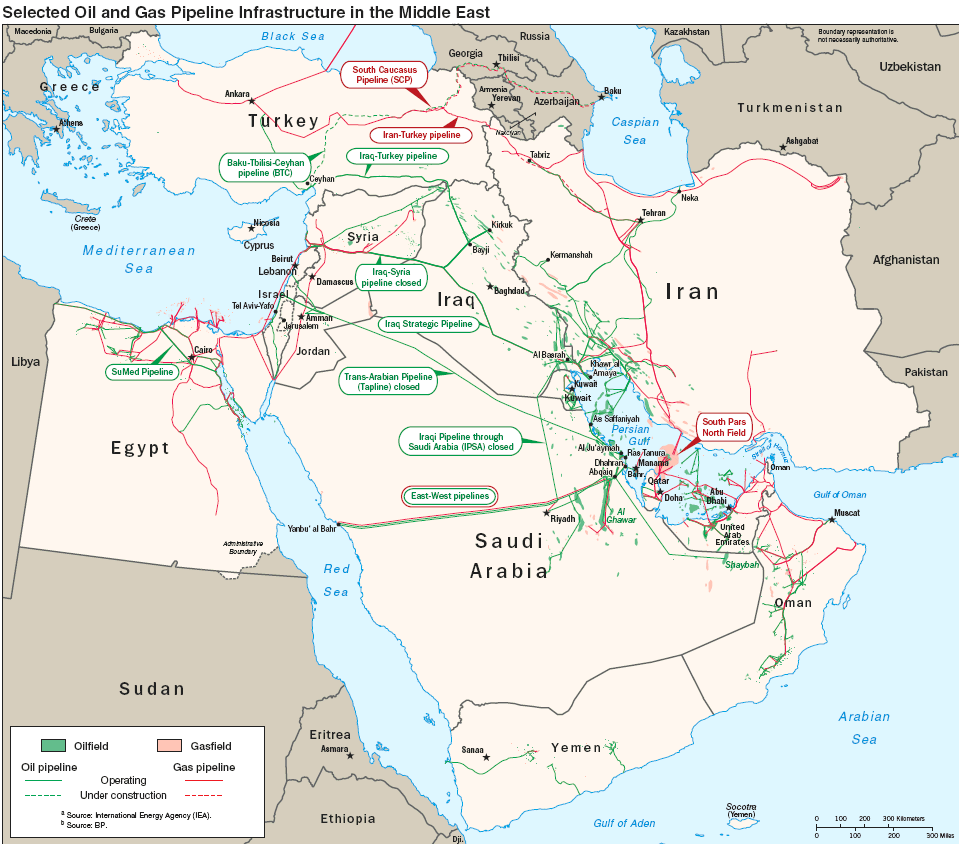
Oil and gas pipelines and fields

The Persian Gulf and its coastal areas are the world's largest single source of petroleum, and related industries dominate the region. The gulf plays a central role in the global energy system. In 2026, approximately one fifth of global LNG exports originate in the Gulf. The region is also a key supplier of refined fuels such as liquefied petroleum gas (LPG), diesel and jet fuel.

Safaniya Oil Field, the world's largest offshore oilfield, is located in the Persian Gulf. Large gas finds have also been made, with Qatar and Iran sharing the world's largest gas field across the territorial median line (North Field in the Qatari sector; South Pars Field in the Iranian sector). Using this gas, Qatar has built up a substantial liquefied natural gas (LNG) and petrochemical industry.

In 2002, the Persian Gulf nations of Bahrain, Iran, Iraq, Kuwait, Qatar, Saudi Arabia, and the UAE produced about 25% of the world's oil, held nearly two-thirds of the world's crude oil reserves, and about 35% of the world's natural gas reserves. The oil-rich countries (excluding Iraq) that have a coastline on the Persian Gulf are referred to as the Persian Gulf States. Iraq's egress to the Persian Gulf is narrow and easily blockaded, consisting of the marshy river delta of the Shatt al-Arab, which carries the waters of the Euphrates and the Tigris rivers, where the east bank is held by Iran.

=== Fertilizer ===
The Persian Gulf is also a major hub for global fertilizer production and exports. Countries such as the Islamic Republic of Iran, Qatar, Saudi Arabia, and Oman are among the world’s leading exporters of nitrogen fertilizers, including urea and ammonia. In the 2020s the region has accounted for roughly 30–35 percent of global urea exports and around 20–30 percent of ammonia exports. Overall, up to 30% of internationally traded fertilizers normally transit the Strait of Hormuz.

== See also ==
- Eastern Arabia
- Eastern Arabian cuisine
- Southern Iran
- Cradle of civilization
- Deluge (prehistoric)
- Fars territory
- Fars province
- Persis
- Musandam Peninsula
- History of the United Arab Emirates#The pearling industry and the Portuguese empire: 16th - 18th century
- Saeed bin Butti#Perpetual Maritime Truce
- Trucial States
- Sultan bin Saqr Al Qasimi#Perpetual Maritime Truce of 1853
- Persian Gulf campaign of 1809
- Persian Gulf campaign of 1819
- General Maritime Treaty of 1820

Nations:

- Geography of Iran
- Geography of Saudi Arabia
- Geography of Oman
- Geography of United Arab Emirates
- Geography of Qatar
- Geography of Bahrain
- Geography of Kuwait
- Geography of Iraq

== Sources ==
This article incorporates text from a free content work. Licensed under CC BY 4.0 (license statement/permission). Text taken from Global Agrifood Implications of the 2026 Conflict in the Middle East, Impacts on energy and fertilizer trade, and food security. Food and Agriculture Organization of the United Nations.

- Limits of Oceans and Seas (PDF) (3rd ed.). International Hydrographic Organization. 1953. Archived from the original (PDF) on 8 October 2011.
