= Grzegorz Olszak =

Polish politician

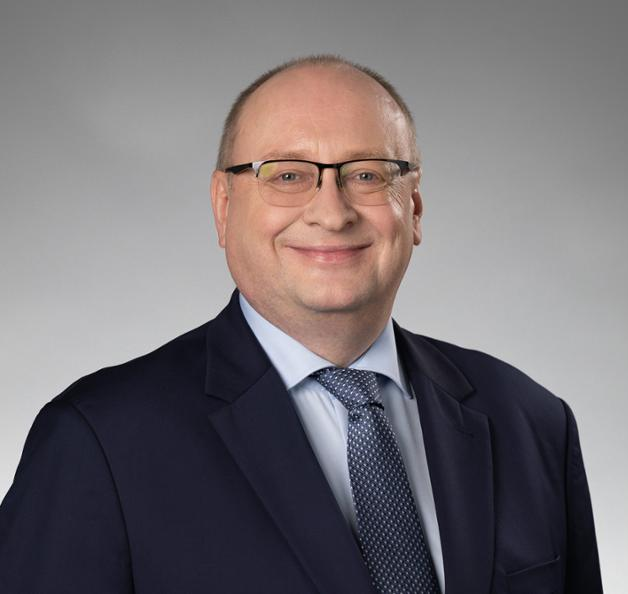
- Grzegorz Olszak (2024)

5th Poland Ambassador to Kuwait
- In office 2013–2017
- Preceded by: Janusz Szwedo
- Succeeded by: Paweł Lechowicz

Personal details
- Born: 1969 (age 56–57) Puławy, Poland
- Education: University of Warsaw, National School of Public Administration
- Profession: civil servant, diplomat

Grzegorz Olszak (born in 1969 in Puławy) is a Polish civil servant and diplomat, serving as Poland chargé d'affaires to Libya (since 2023) and Ambassador to Kuwait (2013–2017).

== Life ==
Grzegorz Olszak graduated at the University of Warsaw from Arab studies (M.A., 1996) and from international relations (M.A., 1998). He was educated also at the National School of Public Administration (1999–2001). He spent three years in Cairo, two as a student of the Cairo University and one as an assistant of the director of the Polish Centre of Mediterranean Archaeology University of Warsaw in Cairo.

After graduation he was working at the Ministry of the Interior and Administration, as a member of the military personnel of the Polish Military Contingent in Syria. Between 2001 and 2005, he worked for the Ministry of Environment where he reached the position of the director of the Minister's Office. In January 2005, he joined the Ministry of Foreign Affairs. From October 2005 to August 2009, he was deputy head of the Embassy in Cairo, for eight months heading it as chargé d'affaires. Afterwards, he was head of a unit at the MFA Department of Africa and the Middle East. From February to July 2012, he was head of the U.S. Interests Section at the Embassy of Poland in Damascus, Syria. In 2012, he was nominated Poland ambassador to Kuwait, accredited additionally to Bahrain. He started his mission on 23 April 2013. He ended his term on 31 August 2017. In autumn 2023, he became chargé d’affaires to Libya (residing in Tunis).

Besides Polish, he speaks English, Arabic and Russian.
