= Persian Gulf Basin =

Geological basin

- Stratigraphic range: Precambrian to Neogene
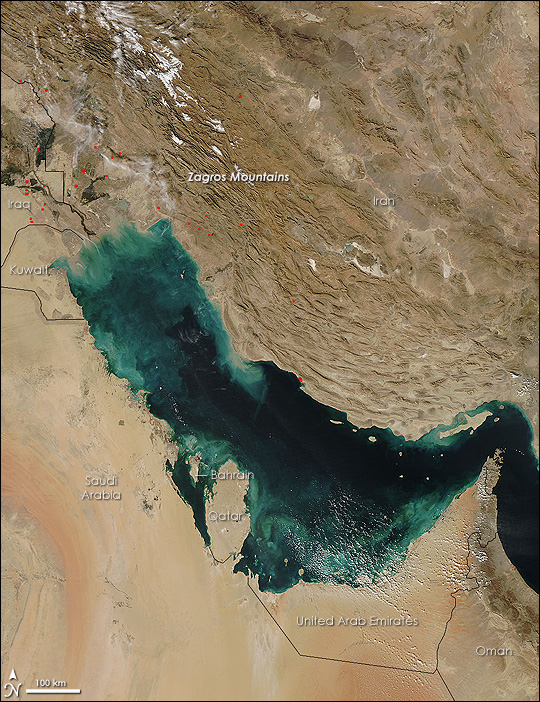
- Satellite picture of the Arabian Plate Basin
- Type: Foreland Basin
- Area: 240,000 km^{2} (93,000 sq mi)
- Thickness: 12 to 13 km

Location
- Location: Iran, Iraq, Kuwait, Saudi Arabia, Qatar, Bahrain, United Arab Emirates and Oman (exclave of Musandam)
- Region: Western Asia

Type section
- Country: Iran, Kuwait, United Arab Emirates, Saudi Arabia, Qatar, Oman, Bahrain and Iraq

The Persian Gulf Basin, is found between the Eurasian and the Arabian plate. The Persian Gulf is described as a shallow marginal sea of the Indian Ocean that is located between the south western side of the Zagros Mountains and Arabian Peninsula and south and southeastern side of Oman and the United Arab Emirates. Other countries that border the Persian Gulf basin include; Saudi Arabia, Qatar, Kuwait, Bahrain and Iraq. The Persian Gulf extends a distance of 1,000 km (620 mi) with an area of 240,000 km^{2} (93,000 sq mi). The Arabian plate basin a wedge-shaped foreland basin which lies beneath the western Zagros thrust and was created as a result of the collision between the Arabian and Eurasian plates.

== Persian Gulf Basin and the Middle East ==
A collection of these countries is commonly referred to as the Middle East which is the oil-rich location in the south western side of the Asia continent. A review of the world's energy with different estimates indicates that the Middle East holds 55% to 68% of the world's oil deposits and more than 40% of the world's recoverable natural gas reserves.

Worldwide, it is the richest side of the world in terms of hydrocarbon resources, both oil and gas reserves with an area of approximately 93000 square miles. The name Persian Gulf in most cases refers not only to the Persian Gulf but also the Gulf of Bahrain, the Gulf of Oman, and the Strait of Hormuz as well as various outlets that are linked to the Arabian Sea.

== Tectonic evolution ==
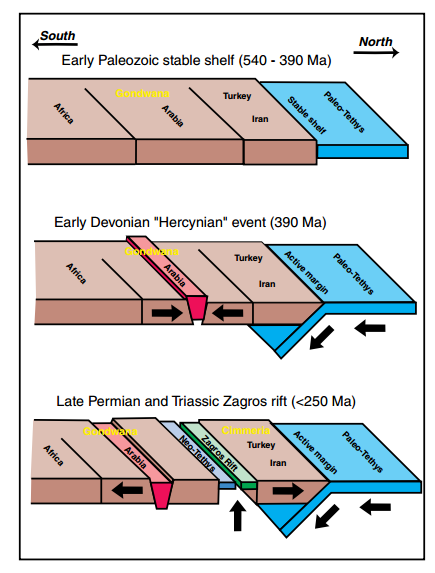
Evolution of Arabian plate tectonics from early Paleozoic to Late Permian and Triassic, showing Early Devonian “Hercynian” compressional event and Early Zagros rifting event (usgs.gov)

The Arabian plate tectonic origin is grouped into six phases which contributed to its current geology:

=== Precambrian phase ===
The early Precambrian (from 800 to 650 Ma) is a compressional phase where a series of island-arcs and micro-continent terrane accreted to form the oldest portions of the Arabian plate (Gondwana). The development of Hormuz saltbasin was a consequence of the last Precambrian orogenic event.

=== Ordovician-Silurian glaciations ===
An expanding of polar glaciation in Gondwana occurred in the Late Ordovician, and later sea level rose in the Early Silurian was as a result of the deglaciation which led to extensive deposition of organic-rich shale that corresponds to a maximum flooding surface. This hot shale is considered the major source of Paleozoic hydrocarbon in Saudi Arabia.

=== Carboniferous phase ===
During the Late Devonian, the plate was located in a back-arc-setting. The initiation of the Hercynian Orogeny led to the uplift of the central Arabian plate and tilted it eastward, which resulted in a basement tectonism and extensive erosion. The Arabian plate underwent many compressional phases during this period.

=== Early Triassic ===
Thermal subsidence and Arabian plate stretching (that resulted from the fragmentation of Gondwana in the Late Permian) resulted in extensional faulting and the early rifting of Zagros that opened the Neo-Tethys Sea.

=== Late Cretaceous phase (early Alpine orogeny) ===
This period was where the Alpine Orogeny started to form as a result of compression, which resulted in major uplifts and erosions, in addition to the closure of Neo-Tethys Sea.

=== Tertiary phase (late Alpine orogeny) ===
During this period there was the second Alpine Orogeny, which was as a result of the collision between the Arabian and the Eurasian plates at the Mesozoic and Cenozoic border and this resulted in the formation of the Zagros Fold Belt together with the extensive Mesopotamian Foredeep and thus the formation of the foreland Persian basin. In addition to the opening of the Red Sea about ~25 Ma, which resulted in the separation of the African and the Arabian plates.

== History of natural resources ==
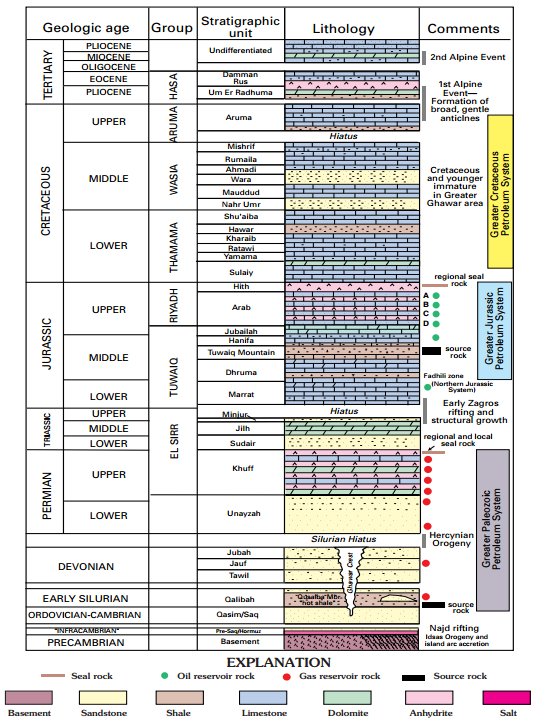
Stratigraphic section, major tectonic events, and stratigraphic units that make up the Greater Paleozoic, Jurassic, and Cretaceous petroleum systems of the eastern Arabian Peninsula (USGS.gov)

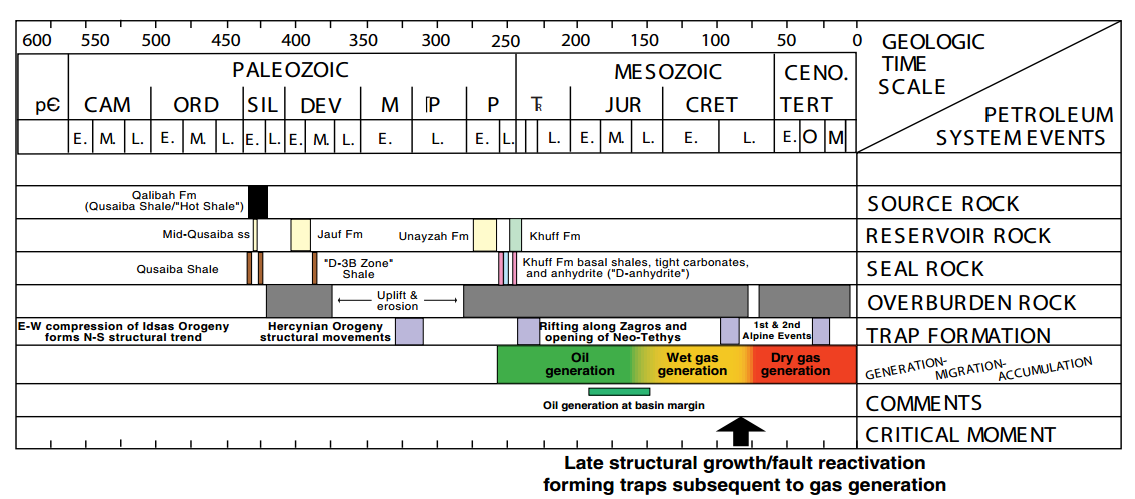
Total petroleum system events chart for Central Arabia (USGS.gov)

The extensive oil and gas reserves of the Persian Gulf basin have a connection with the stable tectonic history. Over time, the Persian Gulf basin area has experienced continuous deposition that was consistent through the Paleozoic era and led to the initial accumulation of the carbonate rocks (which are excellent reservoir rocks) and evaporites (which play a big role as hydrocarbon seal rocks). The accumulation process was favored by the unique landscape and stable subsidence conditions which favored extensive deposition of carbonate rocks and evaporites which resulted in a thickness of ~12 to 13 km. Sediments and other deposits that came from the land were moved and then deposited at the bottom of the basin. Successive deposition and accumulation led to the creation of layers with an increased level of pressure as the processes progressed over time. After the deposition process, the increased pressure led to the breakdown of the organic material and consequently, the formation of the organic rich residue referred to as kerogen. Continuous accumulation and increased pressure combined with heat are applied on the kerogen which then transforms into either oil or gas.

Most of the oil in the Persian Gulf basin is produced from the Jurassic carbonates. However, presently, the rocks rich in organic hydrocarbons exist in three major geological systems:

1. Paleozoic petroleum system
2. Jurassic petroleum system
3. Cretaceous petroleum system

Oil and gas are formed in a source rock (mostly shales), and then they migrate to the reservoir layer of rocks (carbonates). After that, the formation of structural folds and faults in the reservoir rocks leads to the natural creation of zones where the natural resources become trapped and stored as reserves that are commercially recoverable.

Four major tectonic events resulted in the formation of structural traps:

1. Carboniferous Hercynian Orogeny
2. Early Triassic Zagros rifting
3. First (or early Oman) Alpine Orogeny
4. Second (or late) Alpine Orogeny

which led to the collection and successive generations of the hydrocarbons after undergoing deformation and other processes that resulted in the final compartmentalization. In the middle Persian Gulf, large volumes of natural gas collections in Permo-Triassic accumulations have a direct link to the hot shale rocks found in the lower base-Silurian formation. Then the oil migrated to the carbonates reservoir rocks and finally was trapped in the four major traps, which explains why the Persian Gulf basin is one of the richest basins in terms of hydrocarbon resources.

== Structural and tectonic settings ==
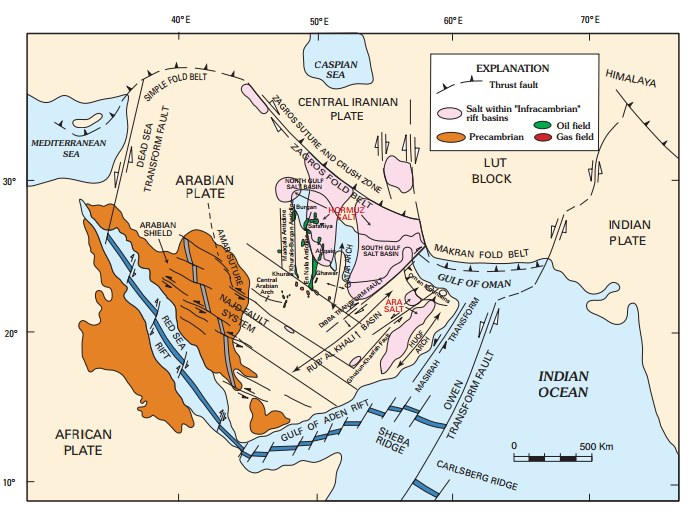
Arabian Plate showing general tectonic and structural features, Infracambrian rift salt basins, and oil and gas fields of Central Arabia and North Gulf area (usgs.gov)

The Arabian plate shows divergent margins around the adjacent areas of the Gulf of Aden, Red Sea and the south western side of the Arabian plate. On the south and south eastern side of the Arabian plate lies the Owen-Sheba which is an intra-oceanic transform fault. Then there is convergent margin located on the north and north eastern side close to Turkey and in the Zagros Mountains located on the east of Iran, where the Arabian plate is subducting underneath the Eurasian plate. Lastly the Dead Sea, which is a transform fault zone found on the north western side of the Arabian plate.

The current deformation and accumulation processes that are related to the natural structures and the subsequent compression of the layers within the Persian Gulf illustrates the origin of the various natural resources found in the place, the geologic processes and the tectonic regimes that occurred.

The tectonic representation of the Middle East is divided into three parts that have different characteristics concerning their age, thickness and types of rocks :

- Stable Arabian shelf
- Unstable Arabian shelf
- Zagros fold-and-thrust belt

The end of the Paleozoic experienced some transformations in terms of subsidence differentiations and sea level rise that led to the formation of structural elements such as the three troughs:

- Arabian Trough – in the middle part of the basin which is largely covered by Saudi Arabia and Bahrain.
- Gotnia Trough – in the northern side of the basin covering Iraq and Syria.
- Rub-Al-Khali – in Saudi Arabia and United Arab Emirates.

Most of the geological characteristics were established during the Paleozoic which were initiated by the continuous continental marine sedimentation on the north east side of Gondwana. Some complex events which were effects of the Carboniferous processes also affected the area through creation of regional uplift, extensive erosions some basement tectonics. Therefore, the consistent tectonic geological evolution and the structural settings that resulted thereafter formed the Arabian plate after successive tectonic regimes.
