= Michał Cholewa (diplomat) =

Polish diplomat

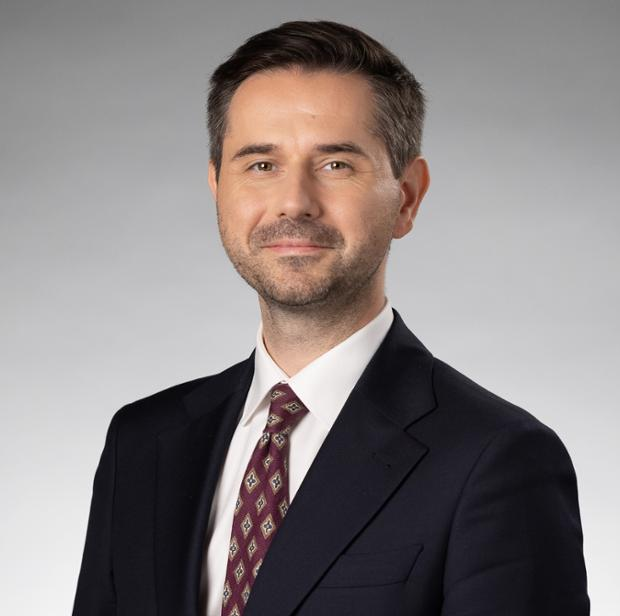

7th Poland Ambassador to Kuwait
- Incumbent
- Assumed office April 2025
- Preceded by: Paweł Lechowicz

Personal details
- Born: 1986 (age 39–40) Chorzów, Poland
- Children: 2
- Education: Jagiellonian University
- Profession: diplomat

Michał Cholewa (born 1986 in Chorzów) is a Polish diplomat who serves as the Ambassador of the Republic of Poland to Kuwait (since 2025).

== Life ==
Michał Cholewa graduated, magna cum laude, at the Jagiellonian University from international relations (major in American studies). He began his PhD studies there. He studied also political science at the Paris 8 University Vincennes-Saint-Denis (2008/2009), and the Harvard University (2019).

He began his diplomatic career as a graduate of the Ministry of Foreign Affairs Diplomatic Academy. He worked in the Policy Planning Department (as head of section), EU External Relations Department, and Africa and the Middle East Department (as head of the Maghreb and Mashreq section). He served in the embassies in Tel Aviv (until 2018) and Paris.

In November 2024, he became head of the Embassy of Poland in Kuwait City. In April 2025, he was nominated Ambassador to Kuwait, accredited additionally to Bahrain.

As a member of the Ministry’s association football team he won gold and silver medals at the diplomatic tournaments for the Baltic Cup as well as the Central European Cup.

Married to Agata. Father of two sons.
