= Bust of Krzysztof Kozłowski =

Monument in Warsaw, Poland

- Interactive map of Bust of Krzysztof Kozłowski
- Location: 5 Batorego Street, Mokotów, Warsaw, Poland
- Coordinates: 52°12′39.6″N 21°00′59.3″E
- Type: Bust
- Material: Bronze
- Opening date: 25 October 2013
- Dedicated to: Krzysztof Kozłowski

The bust of Krzysztof Kozłowski (Polish pronunciation: [ˈkʂɘʂ.tɔf kɔˈzwɔf.ski]; Polish: popiersie Krzysztofa Kozłowskiego) is a monument in the city of Warsaw, Poland, placed at the courtyard of the Ministry of the Interior and Administration building at 5 Batorego Street, in the neighbourhood of Old Mokotów. It is dedicated to Krzysztof Kozłowski, the first Minister of the Interior and Administration of the Third Polish Republic, serving from 1990 to 1991. The monument takes the form of a bronze bust placed on top of a pedestal. It was unveiled on 26 October 2013.

== History ==
The monument commemorates Krzysztof Kozłowski, the first Minister of the Interior and Administration of the Third Polish Republic, serving from 1990 to 1991. It was proposed by the Social Committee for the Commemoration of Late Krzysztof Kozłowski, which included members such as Tadeusz Mazowiecki, Andrzej Milczanowski, Wojciech Brochwicz, Jerzy Miller, and Henryk Woźniakowski. The funds for it were collected via the public donations. The monument was unveiled on 25 October 2013 by Bartłomiej Sienkiewicz, the Minister of Interior and the coordinator of the special forces.
