= Orlengate =

Polish political scandal

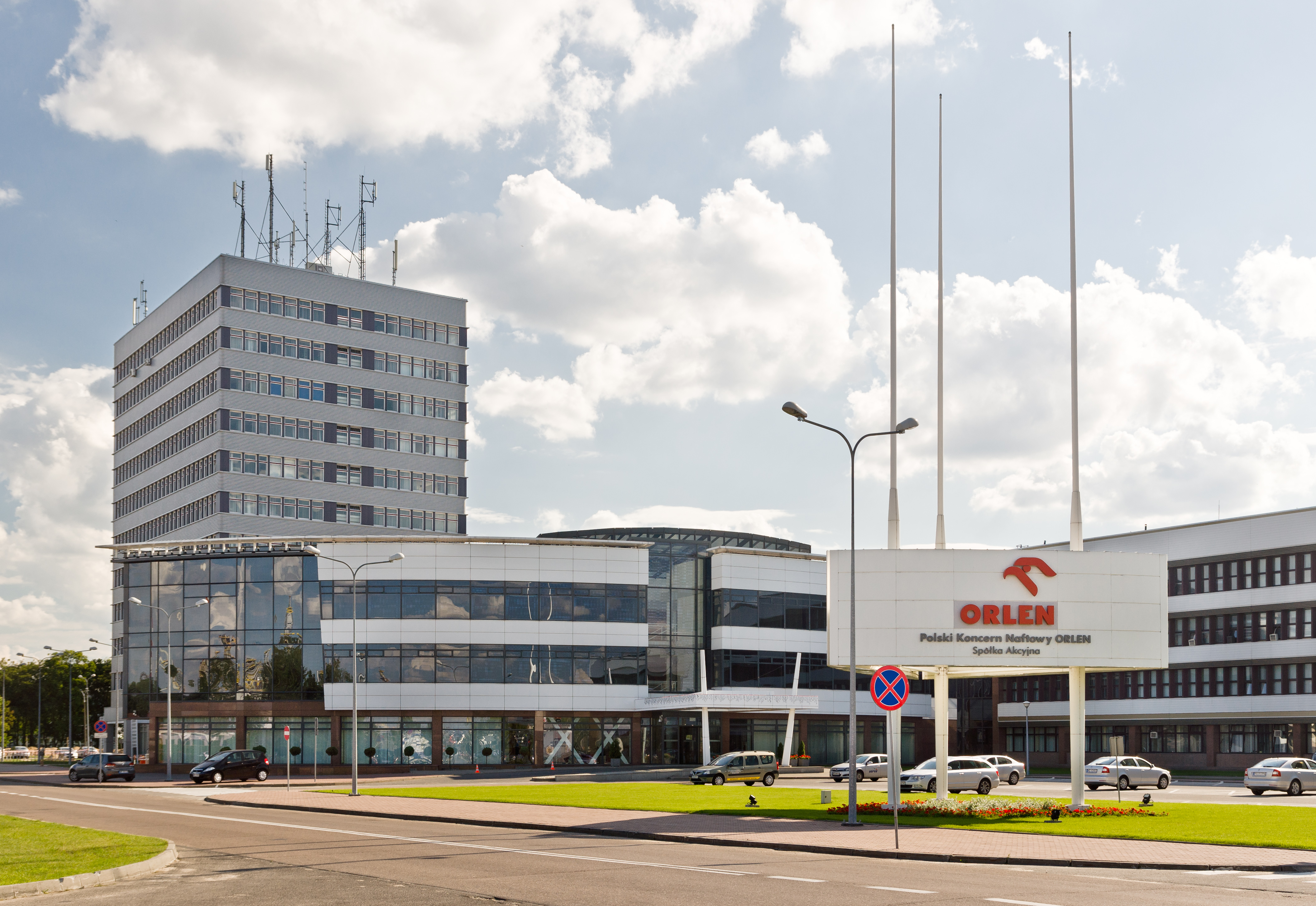
Orlen's headquarters in Płock, Poland

Orlengate (Polish: Afera Orlenu) was one of the biggest political scandals in modern Polish history. Disclosed in 2004, the scandal began with the arrest of Andrzej Modrzejewski, former CEO of PKN Orlen, on 7 February 2002 by the Office of State Protection (UOP). In 2004, Sejm initiated an investigatory committee to investigate the scandal.

Modrzejewski was arrested as per the order of the attorney general's office. The arrest was a source of controversy from the beginning, carried out on the eve of a board of directors meeting. Two hours before the meeting, Modrzejewki was released and the board removed him from his position.

Former Treasury Minister Wiesław Kaczmarek stated in an interview with Gazeta Wyborcza that the real purpose of the arrest was to provoke Modrzejewki's dismissal and to block the signing of a contract for oil worth 14 billion USD. According to this interview, the decision to arrest Modrzejewski was taken during an unofficial meeting of the Prime Minister's cabinet with Leszek Miller, Minister of Justice Barbara Piwnik and Chief of the UOP, Zbigniew Siemiątkowski. Kaczmarek, who also participated, disclosed the purpose of the meeting to avoid possible future accusations of misconduct during his term as Treasury Minister.

For their part in the scandal, Ryszard Bieszyński and Zbigniew Siemiątkowski were arrested in 2012 and 2013 respectively.

== PKN Orlen investigation commission ==
After the publication of the article, the Katowice attorney general began their investigation into the scandal. Sejm's official Committee for Special Services started an independent investigation and found that the UOP put pressure on the attorney's office. The ABW, the UOP's successor, denied it. In April 2004, Sejm proposed a special investigative committee. This decision was taken by the Sejm on 28 May, and the first session happened on 6 July.

The commission discovered new threads in the case, and on 21 October 2004 it published notes from the Intelligence Agency describing a meeting between Jan Kulczyk and Władimir Ałganow in Vienna in July 2003. Kulczyk allegedly mentioned his influence on president Aleksander Kwaśniewski, who could enable a privatization of the Gdańsk refinery on advantageous conditions for the Russians.

On 10 November 2004, the committee obtained transcripts of 160 wiretapped calls of lobbyist Marek Dochnal from the ABW. Dochnal allegedly negotiated the sale of important energy firms with Treasury Minister Zbigniew Kaniewski. Dochnal was allegedly referred to the Minister by SLD member Andrzej Pęczak, who was working with Dochnal in exchange for a luxurious car. Calls between Pęczak and Dochnal's coworker, Krzysztof Popenda were recorded, where the member negotiated the details of the car's equipment.

In July 2006 the court acquitted Modrzejewski of charges relating to sharing of confidential information to Grzegorz Wieczerzak, and in December 2006 the court acquitted Modrzejewski and Wieczerak of other charges.

In 2012, Ryszard Bieszyński was convicted in relation to the case, along with Zbigniew Siemiątkowski in 2013. In the verbal justification of the judgement, the judge pointed towards the attorney general's assistance of the UOP and the coordinated, extra-legal activities of the UOP and the Prime Minister Leszek Miller's office.

The commission did not reach a conclusion. According to public opinion, it was considered a political tool of the right-wing opposition (Law and Justice, Civic Platform, League of Polish Families) to destroy the presidential aspirations of Włodzimierz Cimoszewicz.

=== Commission members ===
- Józef Gruszka, Polish People's Party (PSL) - chairman
- Roman Giertych, League of Polish Families (LPR) - vice-chairman
- Zbigniew Wassermann, Law and Justice (PiS) - vice-chairman
- Andrzej Aumiller, Labour Union (UP) - vice-chairman
- Bogdan Bujak, Democratic Left Alliance (SLD) - member
- Andrzej Rożański, Democratic Left Alliance (SLD) - member
- Andrzej Grzesik, Self-Defence of the Republic of Poland (SRP) - member
- Andrzej Celiński, Social Democracy of Poland (SDPL) - member
- Konstanty Miodowicz, Civic Platform (PO) - member
- Zbigniew Witaszek, Federated Parliamentary Club (FKP) - member
- Antoni Macierewicz, National-Catholic Movement (RKN) - member
