= Lustration in Poland =

Polish policy regarding former communists

Lustration in Poland is the policy of limiting the participation of former communists – especially of informants of the communist secret police – during 1944–1990, in successor governments or even in civil-service positions.

The term lustration, "cleansing", stems from the Latin word lustratio, for a Roman purification ceremony.

The first Polish lustration bill was passed by the Polish parliament in 1992, but was declared unconstitutional by the Constitutional Tribunal of the Republic of Poland. Subsequently other bills were submitted and reviewed by a special commission, resulting in a new lustration law passed in 1996.

== 1997–2007 ==
In the years 1997–2007 lustration was dealt with by the office of Public Interest Spokesperson (Rzecznik Interesu Publicznego), who analyzed lustration declarations and could initiate further proceedings, including submitting a request to the courts to initiate a legal lustration proceeding. The declarations may be seen as forms of public confessions, through which offices are exchanged for truth in a similar way as amnesty was exchanged for truth in South Africa. Owing to its resemblance with the South African truth and reconciliation process, the Polish lustration system of the period is seen as the most innovative among all lustration models in Central and Eastern Europe.

== 2007 ==
On 18 December 2006 Polish law regulating Institute of National Remembrance (pol. Instytut Pamięci Narodowej - IPN) was changed and came into effect on 15 March 2007. This change gave IPN new lustration powers . The first Polish lustration laws were adopted in 1997; only since 2007 do they officially involve IPN, which has now replaced the old Polish lustration institution, the Public Interest Spokesman. According to the revised Chapter 5a of the Act of 18 December 1998 on the Institute of National Remembrance – Commission for Prosecution of Crimes against the Polish Nation (Ustawa z dnia 18 grudnia 1998 r. o Instytucie Pamięci Narodowej — Komisji Ścigania Zbrodni przeciwko Narodowi Polskiemu), the Lustration bureau of the Institute of National Remembrance performs the following functions:

1. maintains the register of lustration statements;
2. analyzes lustration statements and collects information necessary for its correct assessment;
3. prepares lustration procedures;
4. notifies the respective bodies about non-performance by non-judicial bodies of obligations in accordance with this Law;
5. prepares and publishes catalogues of documents containing personal data:

a) produced by this individual (or with their participation) in connection with their activities as a secret informant
b) from the content of which it follows that the relevant individual was regarded by security services as a secret informer or operational assistant collecting information.

Lustration by IPN was to be obligatory for 53 categories of people born before August 1, 1972, and holding positions of significant public responsibility, including lawyers, public notaries, attorneys, journalists and academic workers. However, key articles of that law were judged unconstitutional by Poland's Constitutional Court or Constitutional Tribunal of the Republic of Poland on May 11, 2007, making the role of IPN unclear and putting the whole process into question. Most importantly, the part of the law that would have required about 700,000 people in the above 53 categories to submit declarations on whether they had spied for the secret services has been thrown out. With this key change, the role of IPN in the lustration process is at present highly unclear. Some influential opinionmakers and politicians in Poland are now declaring that, since the whole lustration process in the old format is essentially over, the secret police archives should simply be thrown open. Others oppose such a move, arguing that the release of all of the personal and confidential information contained in the files would cause unacceptable harm to innocent people.

== Controversy surrounding counterfeit files and fake police reports ==
The former head of the State Protection Office (UOP), General Gromosław Czempiński, and others have described a process by which counterfeit top-secret files and faked police reports were produced by the Communist secret service in the People's Republic of Poland. Their purpose was to undermine the credibility of prominent opponents of the ruling party and many other persons by ruining their good names as private individuals. Fałszywka (pl: fałszywki) contained fake revelations about opposition members' working as alleged police informants under the communist system. The communist secret service used them frequently, said Czempiński, adding that often the officers who "signed" them were created out of thin air. Writer Jerzy Urban noted that, if available, signatures of alleged collaborators on unrelated documents were xeroxed and pasted into fałszywkas before their reprinting.

The presence of fałszywkas in the secret police archives makes the process of lustration extremely sensitive in Poland, leading to a number of highly publicized cases for slander or libel. Many prominent politicians, such as the Minister Władysław Bartoszewski (a former Auschwitz concentration camp prisoner), and Professor Jerzy Kłoczowski (a member of the UNESCO Executive Board), have been among their targets. Kłoczowski was defended against a libelous SB fałszywka by a 2004 letter published in the newspaper Rzeczpospolita, signed by many Polish intellectuals, including Professor Jerzy Buzek, Tadeusz Mazowiecki, Jan Nowak-Jeziorański, Professor Władysław Bartoszewski, Professor Andrzej Zoll, Józef Życiński, Andrzej Wajda, Professor Barbara Skarga, Professor Jan Miodek, Professor Jerzy Zdrada, Aleksander Hall, Władysław Frasyniuk, Professor Adam Galos, and Krystyna Zachwatowicz.

The extensive use of fałszywkas (fake documents) in communist Poland was confirmed during a 2000 court case by a 1985 document written by Major Adam Styliński during an internal investigation at the Ministry of Internal Affairs. The document described how fałszywkas were produced and disseminated during martial law in Poland. Lech Wałęsa had been a target of fake police reports as early as the early 1970s.

== See also ==
- Communist crime
- Thick line (gruba kreska)
- Instruction UOP nr 0015/92
