= Fałszywka =

Polish socio-political term

Fałszywka (English: false document or forgery) is a Polish socio-political term describing counterfeit top secret files and fake police reports produced by the Ministry of Public Security in the People's Republic of Poland. Their purpose was to undermine the popularity of prominent opponents of Polish United Workers' Party, mainly by attempting to ruin their good name as private individuals. Fałszywka (pl. fałszywki) were used from the beginning of the People's Republic against opponents of the Communist system. These included seemingly stolen or declassified revelations about opposition members working as alleged police informants under the Soviet system. Most notably, some have argued that an entire forged file of this sort was produced in the 1980s and then disseminated by the communist establishment about the leading dissident and future President of Poland Lech Wałęsa when he was nominated for the Nobel Peace Prize. Some politicians claim it was fabricated and then "leaked" to the media (as "proof" of his betrayal of Solidarity) in an attempt to prevent Wałęsa from being awarded the Prize.

== History ==
The former head of the State Protection Office (UOP), General Gromosław Czempiński, described the method in which typical fałszywka used to be made. Nobody ever saw the original document (as in the case of Lech Wałęsa). The Security Service of the Ministry of Internal Affairs made sure that only the photocopies were in circulation, because they could not be denounced as fake, and were easy to make. The Ministry of Public Security used them frequently, said Czempiński, stating also that often the officers who signed them were created out of thin air. Writer Jerzy Urban noted, that (if available) signatures of alleged collaborators, from unrelated documents, were also photocopied and pasted into fałszywkas before reprints.

Following the revolutions of 1989, the fałszywkas were catalogued by the Institute of National Remembrance in accordance with its own mandate, and subsequently also made available to the public based on the right to request access to recorded information held by government organizations (RFI). Numerous prominent politicians, such as the Minister Władysław Bartoszewski (former Auschwitz concentration camp prisoner), and Professor Jerzy Kłoczowski (member of the UNESCO Executive Board), have been noted among their targets. Kłoczowski was defended against slander based on a fałszywka produced by Security Service, in a letter of protest published in Rzeczpospolita in 2004, and signed by a number of Polish public personalities, including Prof. Jerzy Buzek, Tadeusz Mazowiecki, Jan Nowak-Jeziorański, Prof. Władysław Bartoszewski, Prof. Andrzej Zoll, Józef Życiński, Andrzej Wajda, Prof. Barbara Skarga, Prof. Jan Miodek, Prof. Jerzy Zdrada, Aleksander Hall, Władysław Frasyniuk, Prof. Adam Galos, Krystyna Zachwatowicz and many others.

== Lech Wałęsa as agent Bolek ==
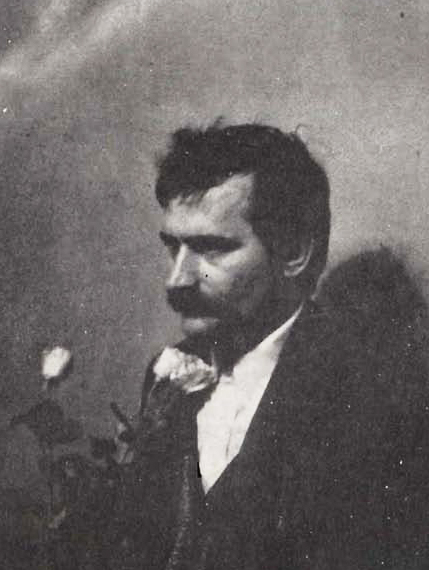
Lech Wałęsa in 1980, Gdańsk

Wałęsa has been accused of having been an informer for the Polish secret police Służba Bezpieczeństwa (SB) already in the early 1970s. A 2008 book by historians from the Institute of National Remembrance (IPN), Sławomir Cenckiewicz and Piotr Gontarczyk, presented evidence provoking a nationwide debate. The book was perceived by some as very controversial; but it contained over 130 pages of documents in support of its thesis, originating from the archives of the SB secret service, which were inherited by the IPN. Cenckiewicz defended his discoveries on those basis. Even Janusz Kurtyka, president of the Institute of National Remembrance at the time, believed it was true, while admitting that the book did not contain a "hundred-percent" proof of Wałęsa in fact being the agent Bolek. To make the matters worse, some of the photocopies went missing from the secret police records during Wałęsa's presidency of Poland (1990–1995), which some commentators perceived as a more serious problem inhibiting the post-communist process of lustration in Poland. The SB security police tried to recruit Wałęsa several times and maintained the Bolek file between 1970 and 1976. At different times in his career Wałęsa had both admitted and denied that he has identified individuals during his interrogations recorded there. However, no compromising SB documents exist about him at all, once he joined the Solidarity Coastal Free Trade Union in the following years.

In 2011 the Bialystok IPN seemingly admitted that the Służba Bezpieczeństwa fabricated some of the documents pertaining to the alleged collaboration of Wałęsa with the secret police. The SB goal was to slander and discredit him before the Nobel committee. The fałszywkas were seemingly confirmed in the 2000 court case by a document written in 1985 by Major Adam Styliński during an internal investigation at the Ministry of Internal Affairs. The document written by Styliński described how the fałszywkas were produced and disseminated by the department as far as Norway during the martial law in Poland. On December 22, 2011, the Institute of National Remembrance confirmed in its final statement that the communist apparatus had forged documents secretly mailed to Oslo in the SB operation "Ambasador" and similar others from the 1980s. In April 2015, on the other hand, the IPN found that there was no evidence that any documents had been falsified regarding Wałęsa's supposed collaboration, which led to the conclusion that the documents on this matter had not been fabricated.

Whether or not SB falsified some of the documents to be sent to the Nobel Committee, Cenckiewicz's and Gontarczyk's conclusion are not based on the suspect documents but rather on the authentic SB records which are wholly independent from the Oslo issue. These documents independently establish Wałęsa's collaboration with SB. According to an IPN announcement in 2011 the claim about the falsification of the Nobel Committee Bolek documents only confirms, not refutes Cenckiewicz's and Gontarczyk's findings, specifically what they wrote about SB's falsification attempts on pp. 137–146 of their book. IPN explicitly rejected the incorrect claim that all Bolek documents were found to be fake.

Cenckiewicz and Gontarczyk also establish that Wałęsa tried to destroy the authentic documents during his presidential tenure.

In 2016-2017 the experts of Prof. Jan Sehn Institute of Forensic Research in Cracow have analyzed the new cache of the Bolek documents demonstrating Wałęsa's collaboration with SB and found them to be completely authentic.

== John Paul II assassination folder ==
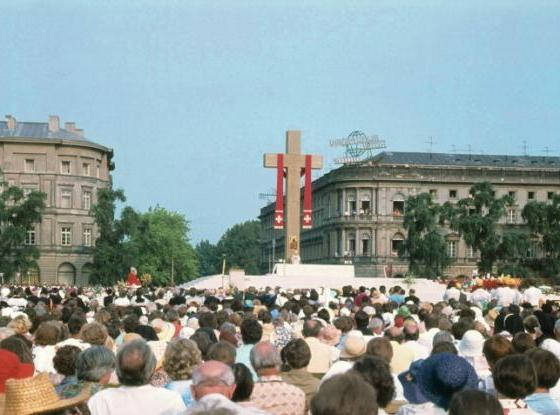
John Paul II at an open-air mass on Victory Square in Warsaw, 1979

On 13 May 1981 Pope John Paul II was shot and critically wounded in Rome by a Turkish gunman. Little is known about classified documents describing an alleged similar attempt on his life during his 1979 Papal visit to Poland. In 2002–2004 the IPN prosecutor Andrzej Witkowski uncovered a fałszywka suggesting that an assassination attempt was planned by the Polish security forces during his church mass in Częstochowa. The information came from the local communist prosecutor Marek Izydorek. However, when Witkowski attempted to locate the actual folder, the only note he found said that there are no such documents.

The alleged John Paul II assassination folder was behind the 1991 publication of an immensely popular book entitled Zabić tego Polaka (To Kill that Pole) printed in Warsaw by Wydawnictwo ROK publishing, with 100,000 copies. The book claimed that the action was conducted not in 1979, but in 1983; and not in Częstochowa, but in Warsaw; and that the only reason why it did not succeed was the faulty bomb detonator. It is suspected that the story was based on a counterfeit police report produced by the Ministry of Public Security.

== See also ==
- Lustration in Poland
