= Grzegorz Małecki =

Official of Polish intelligence and security services

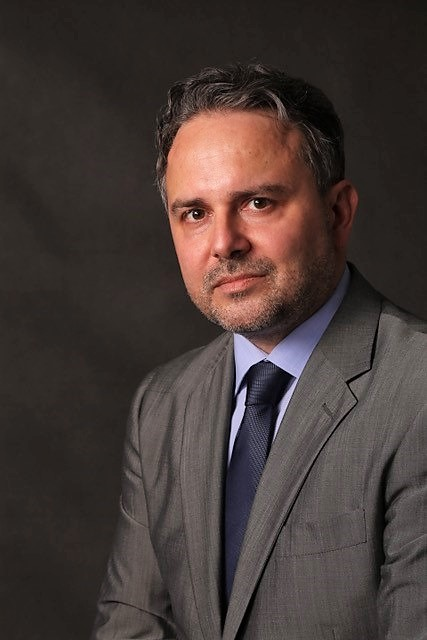

Head of the Polish Foreign Intelligence Agency
- In office 19 February 2016 – 27 September 2016
- Preceded by: Maciej Hunia
- Succeeded by: Piotr Krawczyk

Personal details
- Born: 18 October 1967 (age 58) Wrocław, Poland
- Education: University of Wrocław

Grzegorz Małecki (born 18 October 1967) is an official of Polish intelligence and security services, diplomat, colonel, such as the Office for State Protection (UOP), the Internal Security Agency (ABW) and the Foreign Intelligence Agency (AW). In 2016 he was the Head of the Foreign Intelligence Agency of the Republic of Poland.

== Life ==
He studied at the Faculty of History and Pedagogical Sciences at University of Wrocław, where he graduated in history in 1991. In the same year he joined UOP and completed an officer training in the UOP Central Training Centre in Łódź in 1992. He worked for UOP until 2001 and in this time he was among others deputy director of UOP branch in Opole as well as the head of department in UOP branch in Wrocław. Between 2003 and 2004 he held the position of the head of Inspection and Audit Department in Opole Town Hall. He worked as an advisor to the Head of ABW between 2004 and 2007. In 2006-2008 he lectured at Nicolaus Copernicus University in Toruń. Between 2005 and 2008 he held the position of Director of Buerau and Secretary to the Secret Service Committee. Between 2007 and 2013 he was an advisor to the Head AW, and in 2009 – 2012 he was First Cansellor in the Polish Embassy in Spain. In 2013 he started working for the private sector. On 19 November 2015 he became the Acting Head of AW, and the Head of AW on 19 February 2016. He stopped down from this post on 21 September 2016 and completed his mission as the Head of AW a week later. He was awarded Bronze Cross of Merit and Silver Cross of Merit.
