= UOP Instruction Number 0015/92 =

Internal instruction of Urząd Ochrony Państwa in 1992

UOP Instruction nr 0015/92 was an internal instruction of Urząd Ochrony Państwa issued in October 1992, which allowed the illegal surveillance and, allegedly, the fomenting of the dissolution of those Polish political parties that were in opposition to the Cabinet of the then Prime Minister Hanna Suchocka or to President Lech Wałęsa.

After the downfall of Jan Olszewski's Government in June 1992, and following the revelation of a list of secret collaborators with the former Communist Służba Bezpieczeństwa by the Minister of Internal Affairs Antoni Macierewicz, it was alleged that UOP began the prosecution and dissolution of Polish conservative and independent rightist parties, that were demanding lustration in Poland.

In 1993, Jarosław Kaczyński described UOP 0015/92 and its implications for domestic surveillance at a press conference.

The UOP was formed as a special operational task force, and included former Communist SB officers. The UOP was led by colonel Jan Lesiak.
