= Piotr Naimski =

Polish politician (born 1951)

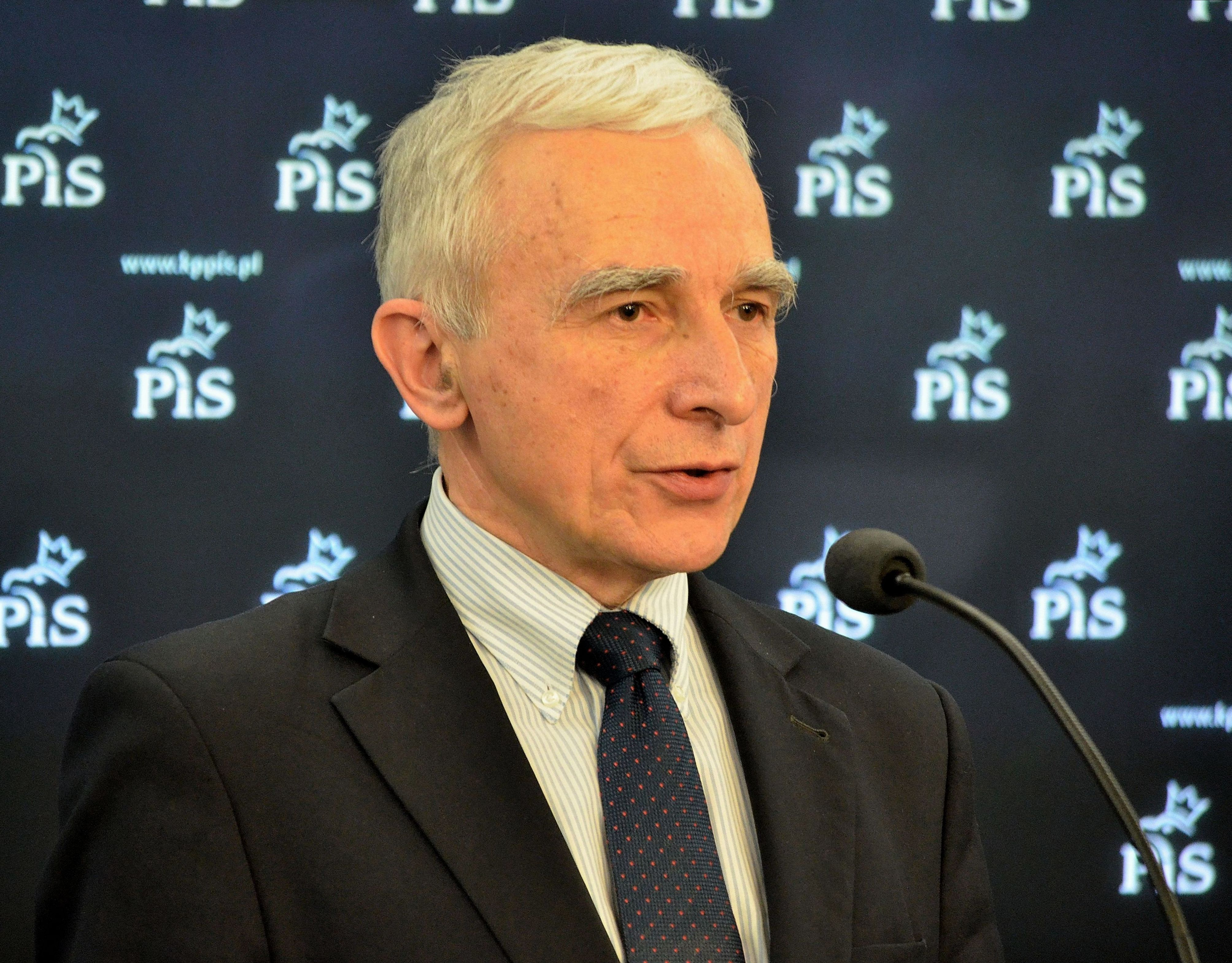

Member of the Sejm
- Incumbent
- Assumed office 9 October 2011

Deputy Minister of Economy
- In office 23 November 2005 – 5 November 2007

Head of the Office for State Protection
- In office 1 February 1992 – 5 June 1992
- Preceded by: Andrzej Milczanowski
- Succeeded by: Andrzej Milczanowski

Personal details
- Born: Piotr Aleksander Naimski; 2 February 1951 (age 75) Warsaw, Poland
- Party: Law and Justice
- Education: University of Warsaw (Ph.D.)
- Profession: Politician, academic
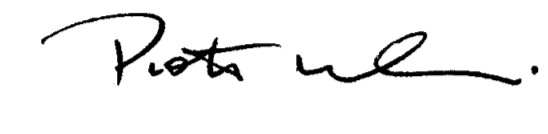
- Signature
- Website: Official website

Piotr Aleksander Naimski (born 2 February 1951) is a Polish politician and academic. He previously served as a Member of the Sejm, the Government Plenipotentiary for Strategic Energy Infrastructure, the Deputy Minister of Economy and the Head of the Office for State Protection.

== Biography ==
Piotr Naimski was born on 2 February 1951. In 1968, he graduated from the Tadeusz Reytan High School in Warsaw. He then studied at the University of Warsaw. In 1981 he received a Doctor of Philosophy in natural science. From 1976 to 1980, Naimski worked at the Institute of Biochemistry and Biophysics of the Polish Academy of Sciences. He was a researcher at the New York University School of Medicine from 1981 to 1984. From 1996 to 2009, Naimski was on faculty at the Wyższa Szkoła Biznesu – National-Louis University, where he has been the Dean of the Faculty of Political Studies.

Since 1964, Naimski was part of the "Black One" scout troop. Naimski took part in organizing assistance to oppressed workers in Radom and Ursus following the June 1976 protests. He was active in the Workers' Defence Committee, working closely with Antoni Macierewicz. In 1980-1981, he served on the board of the Center for Social Research of Solidarity.

In 1981, Naimski was on scholarship in New York City, where he co-organized assistance for Solidarity. He worked at independent anticommunist magazinesGłos and Wiadomości after returning to Warsaw in July 1984.

Naimski was the Director of Głos Publishing from 1989 to 1992, and subsequently worked at the Ministry of Internal Affairs. He was the Head of the Office for State Protection from 1 February 1992 to 5 June 1992. From 1992 to 1996, Naimski was the President of the Atlantic Club. From 1999 to 2001 he was national security adviser in the office of Prime Minister Jerzy Buzek.

From 23 November 2005 to 5 November 2007 Naimski was the Deputy Minister of Economy, and a key person for the Baltic Pipe gasline from Norway to Poland. In 2008, he became an advisor to the Head of the National Security Bureau and a member of the Energy Security Team in the Chancellery of the President. Following the death of President Lech Kaczynski, Naimski resigned from these functions.

Later, Naimski became an advisor at New Direction, a think tank created by the European Conservatives and Reformists. In the 2011 parliamentary elections, he successfully ran for the Sejm, contesting from the Law and Justice list in Nowy Sącz. He was reelected in 2015.

From 23 December 2005 to 20 July 2022 Naimski was the Secretary of State, Government Plenipotentiary for Strategic Energy Infrastructure in Poland.
