= Jerzy Konieczny =

Polish lawyer, civil servant, academic, and author (1950–2020)

Minister of the Interior
- In office 29 December 1995 – 7 February 1996
- Prime Minister: Józef Oleksy
- Preceded by: Andrzej Milczanowski
- Succeeded by: Zbigniew Siemiątkowski

Chief of the Urząd Ochrony Państwa
- In office 15 July 1992 – 1 December 1993
- Preceded by: Andrzej Milczanowski
- Succeeded by: Gromosław Czempiński

Personal details
- Born: 12 September 1950
- Died: 27 July 2020 (aged 69)

Jerzy Marian Konieczny (12 September 1950 – 27 July 2020) was a Polish lawyer, civil servant, academic and author. Konieczny served as the Chief of the Urząd Ochrony Państwa (UOP), Poland's former intelligence agency, from 1992 to 1993. He then served briefly as Minister of the Interior from 1995 to 1996.

== Biography ==
Konieczny was born on 12 September 1950. He earned a degree in chemistry from the University of Silesia in Katowice and studied law at Jagiellonian University. He received his doctorate of law from the University of Wrocław in 1979. He also completed a postdoctoral degree in legal science from the University of Silesia in 1990.

Konieczny served as Chief of the Urząd Ochrony Państwa (UOP) from 1992 to 1993. He founded the Konsalnet security company in 1994. Konieczny later served as the Minister of the Interior from 29 December 1995 until 7 February 1996, in the Cabinet of Prime Minister Józef Oleksy. In 1997, Konieczny ran for a Warsaw-based seat in the Sejm as a Democratic Left Alliance candidate, but lost the election.

He left politics and civil service to become an academic. Konieczny lectured and taught at the University of Silesia in Katowice, the Krakow Academy Andrzej Frycz Modrzewski, the University of Opole, and the University of Management and Marketing in Warsaw. He also co-authored two books: "Justycjariusze, hutmani, policjanci. Z dziejów służb ochrony porządku w Polsce" (co-authored with Andrzejem Abramskim) and "Kryminalistyka" (co-authored with Janem Widackim and Tadeusz Widłą).

Jerzy Konieczny died on 27 July 2020 at the age of 69. He was buried in the Our Lady of Perpetual Help parish cemetery in Rycerka Górna on 31 July 2020.
