= Władysław Czapliński =

Polish historian (1905–1981)

Władysław Czapliński (3 October 1905 in Tuchów – 17 August 1981 in Wrocław) was a Polish historian, a professor of the University of Wrocław, author of many popular books about Polish history.

He finished his studies at the Jagiellonian University in 1927 in the Second Polish Republic, and for the next several years he was a teacher of history. During the Second World War he took part in the underground education in Poland during World War II. After the war he moved to Wrocław, where he worked at the local university until his retirement in 1975.

He received many awards, including an honoris causa diploma from University of Gdańsk. He specialized in the 17th century: history of Denmark, Chmielnicki Uprising, Władysław IV Vasa and the Thirty Years' War.

== Selected publications ==
- Polacy z Czarnieckim w Danii, 1658-59 (1937) [Poles with Czarniecki in Denmark]
- Władysław IV wobec wojny 30-letniej (1937) [Władysław IV and the Thirty Years' War]
- Pierwszy pobyt Jerzego Lubomirskiego na Śląsku (1946) [First visit of Jerzy Lubomirski to Silesia]
- Polska a Prusy i Brandenburgia za Władysława IV (1947) [Poland and Prussia-Branderburg during the reign of Władysław IV]
- Wpływ reformacji i kontrreformacji na stosunki narodowościowe na Śląsku (1949) [Influence of reformation and counterreformation on nationality relations in Silesia]
- Polska a Bałtyk w latach 1632-1648 (1952) [Poland and Baltic during 1632-1648]
- Ruchy ludowe w 1651 roku (1953) [People's movements in 1651]
- Dwa sejmy w roku 1652 roku (1955) [Two Sejms of 1652]
- Ideologie polityczne "Satyr" Krzysztofa Opalińskiego (1956) ["Satyr" political ideologies of Krzysztof Opaliński]
- Na dworze króla Władysława IV (1959) [On the court of king Władysław IV]
- Historia Danii (1965, with Karol Górski) [History of Denmark]
- Władysław IV i jego czasy (1972) [Władysław IV and his times]
- Życie codzienne magnaterii polskiej w XVII wieku (1976, with Józef Długosz) [Everyday life of Polish magnates in 17th century]
- Historia Niemiec (1981, with Adam Galos and Wacław Korta) [History of Germany]
