= Józef Gruszka =

Polish politician (1947–2020)

Józef Zbigniew Gruszka (16 March 1947 – 7 June 2020) was a Polish politician, Member of Parliament, representing Polish People's Party.

Gruszka was born in Kwiatków. He was a graduate of the State Agricultural School (Państwowe Technikum Rolnicze) and a member of Sejm, the lower house of the Polish parliament, elected in Kalisz constituency. From July 2004, he was a member of PKN Orlen investigation commission and, until April 2005, he was also the chairman of the commission. He died in Ostrów Wielkopolski.
