= Mirosław Milewski =

Polish politician

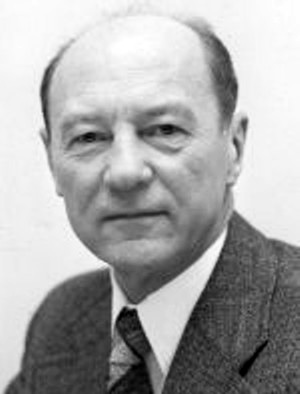

Minister of Interior
- In office 8 October 1980 – 31 July 1981
- Prime Minister: Józef Pińkowski; Wojciech Jaruzelski
- Preceded by: Stanisław Kowalczyk
- Succeeded by: Czesław Kiszczak

Personal details
- Born: 1 May 1928 Lipsk, Second Polish Republic
- Died: 23 February 2008 (aged 69) Warsaw, Poland
- Party: Polish United Workers' Party
- Awards

Military service
- Allegiance: Polish People's Republic
- Branch/service: Milicja Obywatelska; Security Service
- Years of service: 1944–1985
- Rank: Generał Dywizji MO (Major general of MO)
- Battles/wars: Second World War; Anti-communist resistance in Poland (1944–1953)

Mirosław Milewski (1 May 1928 - 23 February 2008) was a Polish communist activist, major general of the Citizens' Militia and Minister of Internal Affairs in the years 1980–1981.

== Biography ==
He was born in Lipsk as a son of Bolesław and Anastazja. Until 1939 he completed 2 grades in a secondary school. After the Soviet invasion of Poland he found employment in the Lipsk Commune Board of the Byelorussian Soviet Socialist Republic administration. In October 1944 he was transferred to the Security Office in Augustów... Together with the units of the Soviet 50th Army, the NKVD troops and units of the Polish People's Army he took part in the Augustów roundup in July 1945. He took an active part in detaining Poles who were later murdered. In 1945 he began cooperation with the Soviet military counterintelligence SMERSH and as a result of his activities many members of the Home Army were arrested

Until March 1946 he served in the Provincial Office of Public Security in Białystok. Then he was transferred to a one-year training course for public security officers. After completing it he returned to Białystok. On 1 April 1955 he was transferred to the Committee for Public Security in Warsaw. In the years 1956-1957 he served in the Citizens' Militia Headquarters in Warsaw. On 1 September 1959 he took the position of head in Department III of the Ministry of Internal Affairs, responsible for monitoring and combating anti-state activities in the country. On 15 November 1962 he took the position of deputy director of Department I (intelligence) and from 15 January 1969 he was the director of that department. On January 25, 1971, he was appointed to the position of Deputy Minister of Internal Affairs and held this position until July 31, 1981. In October 1971, by resolution of the State Council of the Polish People's Republic, he was nominated to the rank of Brigadier General of the Citizens' Militia. The nomination was presented to him at the Belweder Palace by the Chairman of the Council, Józef Cyrankiewicz. In October 1979, he was promoted to the rank of Major General of the Citizens' Militia.

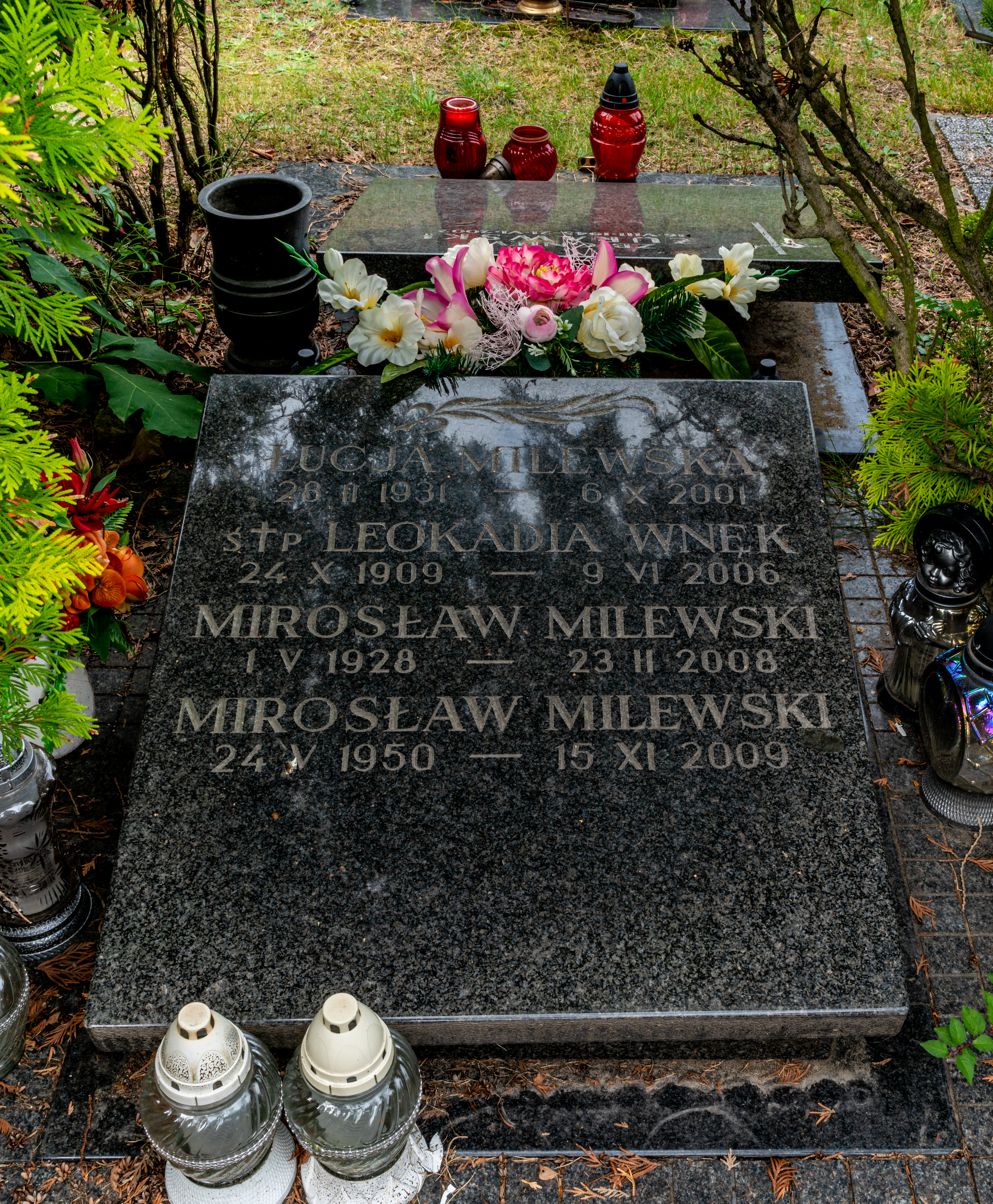
Grave of Mirosław Milewski on the Northern Communal Cemetery in Warsaw

In the years 1945–1948 he was a member of the Polish Workers' Party. After the unification of the Polish Worker's Party and the Polish Socialist Party, he a member of the newly formed Polish United Workers' Party. From 1980 a member of the Central Committee of the Polish United Workers' Party. From July 1981 he was a member of the Politburo and secretary of the Central Committee of the Polish United Workers' Party. In the years 1981–1983 he was a member of the Commission of the Central Committee of the Polish United Workers' Party established to explain the causes and course of social conflicts in the history of the People's Republic of Poland.

He was also a member of the Society of Fighters for Freedom and Democracy. In the years 1979–1985 vice-president of that Society.

Associated with the "Iron" affair and the murder of Father Jerzy Popiełuszko. As a result of these events, in 1985 he was removed from all positions in the party and state, and then retired. In 1990 he was briefly arrested.

He died on February 23, 2008 in Warsaw, and was buried in a family grave at the Northern Communal Cemetery in Wólka Węglowa

== Promotions ==
- Podporucznik (Second lieutenant) - 1949
- Porucznik (First lieutenant) - 1951
- Kapitan (Captain) - 1954
- Major (Major) - 1958
- Podpułkownik (Lieutenant colonel) - 1961
- Pułkownik (Colonel) - 1964
- Generał brygady (Brigadier general) - 1971
- Generał dywizji (Major general) - 1979

== Awards and decorations ==
- Order of the Banner of Labour, 1st Class
- Order of the Cross of Grunwald, 3rd Class
- Commander's Cross of the Order of Polonia Restituta
- Knight's Cross of the Order of Polonia Restituta
- Gold Cross of Merit
- Silver Cross of Merit (twice)
- Bronze Cross of Merit
- Medal of the 30th Anniversary of People's Poland
- Medal of the 40th Anniversary of People's Poland
- Medal of Victory and Freedom 1945
- Medal of the 10th Anniversary of People's Poland
- Silver Medal of Merit for National Defence
- Silver Badge for Merits in the Protection of Public Order
- Bronze Badge for Merits in the Protection of Public Order
- Gold Badge "In the Service of the Nation"
- Silver Badge "In the Service of the Nation"
- Bronze Badge "In the Service of the Nation"
- Order of the Red Star (Czechoslovakia)
- 100th Anniversary of the Birth of Georgi Dimitrov Medal (Bulgaria)
- Order of the Red Star (USSR)

== Bibliography ==
- W. Bagieński (red.), Instrukcje i przepisy wywiadu cywilnego PRL z lat 1953–1990, Warszawa: Instytut Pamięci Narodowej, 2020, ISBN 978-83-8098-203-1, OCLC 1243005981.
- W. Borodziej, J. Kochanowski: PRL w oczach Stasi. Tom II. Dokumenty z lat 1980–1983, Wydawnictwo Fakt, Warszawa 1996, ISBN 83-85776-82-6.
- H. P. Kosk, L. Kosk: Generalicja polska. T. II. Pruszków: Oficyna Wydawnicza „Ajaks", 2001. ISBN 83-87103-81-0. OCLC 69534875.
- L. Kowalski: Generał ze skazą. Biografia wojskowa gen. Wojciecha Jaruzelskiego. Warszawa: Wydawnictwo RYTM, 2001. ISBN 83-88794-43-4. OCLC 830291461.
- Kronika komunizmu w Polsce (oprac. zbiorowe), Wydawnictwo Kluszczyński, Kraków 2009, ISBN 978-83-7447-087-2.
- Kto jest kim w Polsce 1984, L. Becela (red.), Warszawa: Wydawnictwo Interpress, 1984, ISBN 83-223-2073-6, OCLC 830254920.
- M. Czajka, M. Kamler, W. Sienkiewicz: Leksykon Historii Polski. Warszawa: Wydawnictwo Wiedza Powszechna, 1995. ISBN 83-214-1042-1. OCLC 69545827.
- T. Mołdawa: Ludzie władzy 1944–1991. Warszawa: Wydawnictwo Naukowe PWN, 1991. ISBN 83-01-10386-8. OCLC 69290887.
- Leksykon duchowieństwa represjonowanego w PRL w latach 1945–1989: praca zbiorowa, J. Myszor (red.), J. Anteczek, t. 1, Warszawa: Wydawnictwo Verbinum, 2002, ISBN 83-7192-143-8, OCLC 749272042.
- A. Paczkowski: Pół wieku dziejów Polski, Wydawnictwo Naukowe PWN, Warszawa 1996, ISBN 83-01-14487-4.
- P. Pytlakowski: Republika MSW. Warszawa: Wydawnictwo Andy Grafik, 1991. ISBN 83-85265-11-2. OCLC 830495462.
- P. K. Raina: Kardynał Wyszyński i Solidarność, Wydawnictwo „von borowiecky", 2005
- M. F. Rakowski: Dzienniki polityczne 1984–1986, Wydawnictwo Iskry, Warszawa 2005
- W. Roszkowski: Historia Polski, 1914–1991, Wydawnictwo Naukowe PWN, Warszawa 1992
- J. Stroynowski (red.): Who is who in the Socialist countries of Europe: a biographical encyclopedia of more than 12,600 leading personalities in Albania, Bulgaria, Czechoslovakia, German Democratic Republic, Hungary, Poland, Romania, Yugoslavia 1989, tom 3, K.G. Saur Pub., 1989
- R. Szczepkowska: Ks. Jerzy Popiełuszko: życie i śmierć: dokumenty i wspomnienia, Polemika, 1986
- Tajne dokumenty Biura Politycznego. 1980–1981, Wyd. „Ajaks", Londyn 1991
- R. Terlecki: Miecz i tarcza komunizmu: historia aparatu bezpieczeństwa w Polsce, 1944–1990, Wydawnictwo Literackie, 2007
- VI Kongres ZBoWiD Warszawa 7–8 maja 1979, Wydawnictwo ZG ZBoWiD, Warszawa 1979
- Dane osoby z katalogu funkcjonariuszy aparatu bezpieczeństwa. katalog.bip.ipn.gov.pl. [dostęp 2021-11-17].
