= Jacek Cichocki =

Polish politician

Chief of the Chancellery
- In office 25 February 2013 – 16 November 2015
- Prime Minister: Donald Tusk; Ewa Kopacz
- Preceded by: Tomasz Arabski
- Succeeded by: Beata Kempa

Minister of Interior
- In office 18 November 2011 – 25 February 2013
- Prime Minister: Donald Tusk
- Preceded by: Jerzy Miller
- Succeeded by: Bartłomiej Sienkiewicz

Personal details
- Born: 17 December 1971 (age 54) Warsaw, Poland
- Education: Warsaw University

Jacek Cichocki (born 17 December 1971) is a Polish politician and a former member of the Polish Council of Ministers. Cichocki served as the minister of interior in the second cabinet of Prime Minister Donald Tusk and later as chief of the Chancellery for Tusk and his successor Ewa Kopacz

== Early life and education ==
Cichocki was born in Warsaw on 17 December 1971. He received a bachelor's degree in philosophy and sociology from the University of Warsaw.

== Career ==
Cichocki began his career as an expert on armed conflict and ethnic tensions within the former Soviet Union for the Centre for Eastern Studies in 1992, working for the centre until 2008. Additionally, Cichocki also was employed as a programme assistant at the Stefan Batory Foundation for its East-Central Europe Forum, where he worked from 1995 to 1997. He became deputy director of the Centre for Eastern Studies in 2001. From 2004 to 2007, he served as the head of the centre. Following this term, Cichocki joined the government of Prime Minister Donald Tusk, working as a secretary of state for security services in the Chancellery from 2007 to November 2011.

Following a cabinet reshuffle by Prime Minister Tusk, Cichocki was appointed interior minister in Tusk's second cabinet on 18 November 2011, where Cichocki presided over the nation's law enforcement services. Cichocki replaced Jerzy Miller in the post. During his tenure, Cichocki presided over security operations during the UEFA Euro 2012 football championship, defending the event's security preparations and the Policja's response to the 12 June 2012 violent clashes between Polish and Russian fans in Warsaw coinciding with a match between both teams. Following the riot, Cichocki demanded prosecutors to aggressively pursue legal actions against detained Polish hooligans to "fully feel the consequences of their antics," while ordering arrested Russian fans to be deported and excluded from entering the Schengen Area for five years. Cichocki concluded after the championship's completion that far fewer people were arrested during the events than had been expected.

Cichocki's tenure at the interior ministry lasted until 25 February 2013, when he was replaced by Bartłomiej Sienkiewicz. Cichocki was then subsequently reshuffled in the cabinet to become chief of the chancellery, replacing Tomasz Arabski in the post.

Cichocki served as a non-affiliated independent member of the cabinet during both the Civic Platform and Polish People's Party coalition governments under Tusk and later Prime Minister Ewa Kopacz.

Government offices
Preceded by Jerzy Miller	Interior Minister of Poland; 2011 – 2013	Succeeded by Bartłomiej Sienkiewicz
