= Beata Kempa =

Polish politician (born 1966)

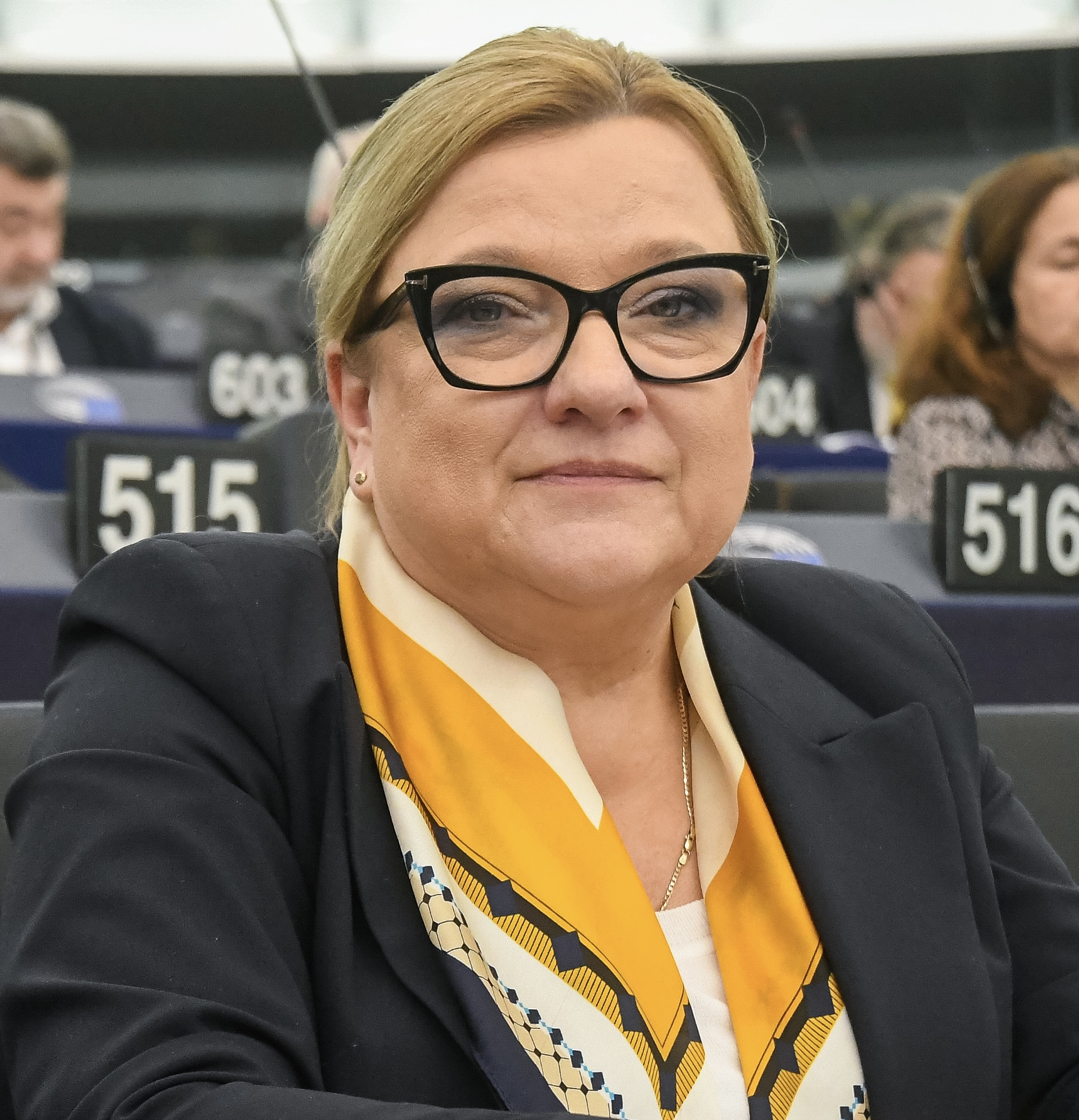
- Kempa in 2024

Member of the European Parliament for Lower Silesian and Opole
- In office 2 July 2019 – 15 July 2024

Chief of the Chancellery
- In office 16 November 2015 – 18 December 2017
- Prime Minister: Beata Szydło; Mateusz Morawiecki
- Preceded by: Jacek Cichocki
- Succeeded by: Michał Dworczyk

Member of the Sejm
- In office 25 September 2005 – 1 July 2019
- Constituency: 3 – Wrocław (2005-2011); 33 – Kielce (2011-2015); 3 – Wrocław (2015-2019)

Personal details
- Born: 11 February 1966 (age 60) Syców, Poland
- Party: Law and Justice (2001-2011), (2024-present); Sovereign Poland (2012-2024)
- Education: University of Wrocław
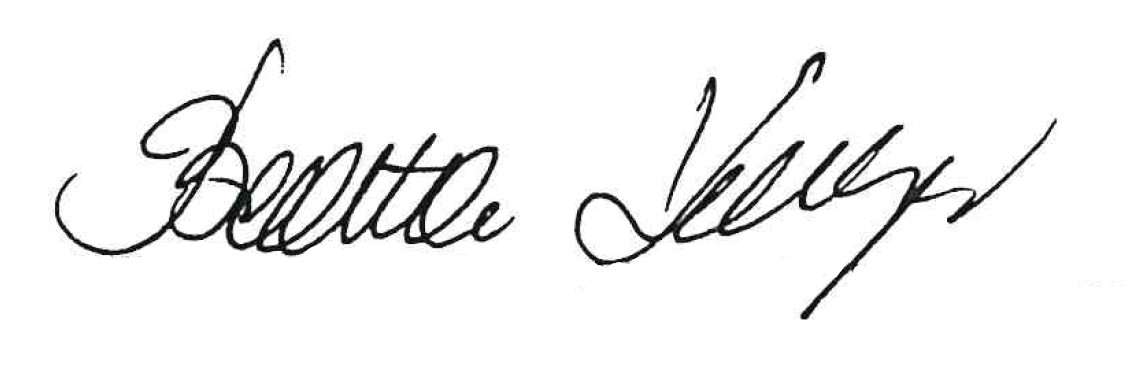
- Signature
- Website: http://www.beatakempa.pl

Beata Agnieszka Kempa (née Płonka; born 11 February 1966, in Syców) is a Polish politician. She was elected to the Sejm on 25 September 2005, getting 5,378 votes in 3 Wrocław district on the Law and Justice list. From 2015 to 2017, Kempa served as Chief of the Chancellery of the Prime Minister. From 2024 to 2025 advisor to the President of Poland, Andrzej Duda.

On 4 November 2011 she, along with 15 other supporters of the dismissed PiS MEP Zbigniew Ziobro, left Law and Justice on ideological grounds to form a breakaway group, United Poland. In December 2015 it gained media attention after sending a letter to the President of the Constitutional Tribunal, Andrzej Rzepliński, informing him that the publication of the judgment of 3 December 2015 on K 34/15 concerning the conformity with the Constitution of the Republic of Poland of certain provisions of the Act of 25 June 2015 About the Constitutional Court]. This was the first such case since the Constitutional Court's inception in 1986 [16]. A prosecutor of the District Prosecutor's Office in Warsaw investigated the abuse of powers in connection with the publication of the judgment. It was redeemed in January 2016 in the absence of the crime (in the justification it was pointed out that the actions of the head of the Chancellery did not affect the publication of the judgment, as it was within the competence of the prime minister).

== See also ==
- Members of Polish Sejm 2005-2007
