= Office of State Protection =

Polish Intelligence and security agency (1990–2002)

- Urząd Ochrony Państwa; UOP

Agency overview
- Formed: 1990
- Preceding agency: Security Service
- Dissolved: 2002
- Superseding agencies: Internal Security Agency; Foreign Intelligence Agency
- Jurisdiction: Poland
- Headquarters: Warsaw
- Agency executives: Krzysztof Kozłowski (1990), First Head; Andrzej Barcikowski (2002), Last Head
- Parent agency: Ministry of the Interior and Administration

The Office of State Protection (Polish: Urząd Ochrony Państwa (Polish pronunciation: [ˈuʐɔnt ɔˈxrɔnɨ ˈpaɲstfa], UOP)) was the intelligence agency of Poland from 1990 to 2002, when it was split into two new agencies.

== Foundation ==
The UOP was founded on 6 April 1990 as a department of the Ministry of Internal Affairs. Krzysztof Kozłowski served as the UOP's first chief from 1990 to 1992. In 1996, the UOP was transformed into a separate government agency under the supervision of the prime minister. It was responsible for intelligence, counter-intelligence and government electronic security, including telephone wiretaps.

== Reasons for formation ==
The UOP replaced the communist-era Służba Bezpieczeństwa (SB), I Departament People's Republic of Poland Ministry of Internal Affairs – intelligence, II Departament People's Republic of Poland Ministry of Internal Affairs – counter-intelligence, whose responsibilities had additionally included the suppression of opposition to the government prior to 1989.

== Agency split ==
In June 2002, the agency was split into two separate entities – Agencja Bezpieczeństwa Wewnętrznego (Internal Security Agency), which deals with internal security of the country, and Agencja Wywiadu (Foreign Intelligence Agency), which deals with foreign intelligence. The abolition of the office enabled the dismissal of several hundred people from service, without the possibility of using the appeals procedure. While budgetary restrictions were cited as the reason for the dismissal, but a political criterion was used as well.

== Chiefs ==
- Krzysztof Kozłowski (1990 – 1990)
- Andrzej Milczanowski (1990 – 1992)
- Piotr Naimski (1992)
- Andrzej Milczanowski (1992)
- Jerzy Konieczny (1992 – 1993)
- Gromosław Czempiński (1993 – 1996)
- Andrzej Kapkowski, p.o. szefa UOP (1996 – 1996)
- Andrzej Kapkowski (1996 – 1997)
- Jerzy Nóżka, p.o. szefa UOP (1997 – 1998)
- Zbigniew Nowek (1998 – 2001)
- Zbigniew Siemiątkowski, p.o. szefa UOP (2001 – 2002)
- Andrzej Barcikowski (2002)

== See also ==
- Instruction UOP nr 0015/92
