= Piotr Krawczyk (government official) =

Polish government official

Piotr Krawczyk is a Polish government official. He was the head of the Foreign Intelligence Agency from 2016 to 2022.
