= Kazimierz Świtała =

Polish politician (1923–2011)

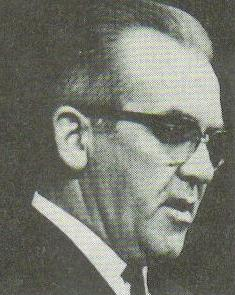
- Minister Kazimierz Świtała

Minister of Interior
- In office 15 July 1968 – 13 February 1971
- Prime Minister: Józef Cyrankiewicz; Piotr Jaroszewicz
- Preceded by: Mieczysław Moczar
- Succeeded by: Franciszek Szlachcic

Personal details
- Born: 21 March 1923 Rakoniewice, Second Polish Republic
- Died: 6 March 2011 (aged 87) Warsaw, Poland
- Party: Polish United Workers' Party
- Awards

Military service
- Allegiance: Polish People's Republic
- Branch/service: Polish People's Army
- Years of service: 1944–1946
- Rank: Porucznik (First lieutenant)
- Battles/wars: Second World War

Kazimierz Czesław Switala (Rakoniewice, Poland on 21 April 1923 – Warsaw, 6 March 2011) was a Polish communist politician. He was the Minister of Internal Affairs from 1968 to 1971, but was forced to resign as a result of the December 1970 massacre of 44 revolting Polish workers. He was a member of the Central Committee of the Polish United Workers' Party from 1968 to 1971, and the head of the Chancellery of the Sejm of the Polish People's Republic (1972–1986).

== Biography ==
Son of Wacław and Maria. In August 1944 he joined the Polish Army. He was assigned to the 37th Artillery Regiment, then sent to the Officers' School of Artillery at the 2nd Polish Army. He graduated at the end of 1944 with the rank of second lieutenant. He took part in the fights of the 2nd Polish Army, as a commander of a fire platoon and a liaison officer of the artillery staff. He was demobilized in 1946 with the rank of lieutenant.

From 1948 he was a member of the Polish United Workers' Party. In 1951 he graduated from law studies at the Higher School of Law in Warsaw, and then from the University of Poznań, obtaining a master's degree in law.

From 1951 he was a judge of the District Court and the Provincial Court in Poznań. He also held the position of Provincial Director of Ideological and Professional Training. In the years 1955–1958 he was the president of the Provincial Court in Katowice. From 1958 he was the vice-president of the Provincial Court for the capital city of Warsaw, and then the president of the Provincial Court for the Warsaw Voivodeship. In the years 1960–1961 he was the director of the Department of Court Supervision in the Ministry of Justice. For 1961 he was the president of the Provincial Court for the capital city of Warsaw, and in the years 1961–1965 the deputy Public Prosecutor General. In the years 1965–1967 he was the undersecretary of state in the Ministry of Justice. From 1967 he was the deputy minister of internal affairs, deputy of general Mieczysław Moczar. From 15 July 1968 to 13 February 1971 he was the Minister of Internal Affairs in the government of Józef Cyrankiewicz and in the government of Piotr Jaroszewicz. As Minister of Internal Affairs, he did not play a decisive role in managing the ministry, as he did not come from the security apparatus.

In December 1970, he participated in a meeting in the office of the First Secretary of the Central Committee of the Polish United Workers' Party, Władysław Gomułka, during which a decision was made to use weapons against protesters on the Coast. After the events of December 1970, he was removed from the position of Minister of Internal Affairs and transferred to the position of head of the Chancellery of the Sejm, which he held in the years 1972–1986.

In the years 1979–1990 a member of the presidium of the Main Board of the Union of Fighters for Freedom and Democracy, from 1985 chairman of the Verification Commission. From 1951 he was also a member of the Union of Polish Lawyers, and from 1968 he was its vice-president.

In 1995 he was accused of directing the massacre of workers during the protests in 1970. Due to poor health he was excluded from the court proceedings in this case.

He was married to Urszula Maria née Stróżyk. He was buried at the Powązki Military Cemetery in Warsaw.

== Awards and decorations ==
- Order of the Banner of Labour, 1st Class
- Commander's Cross with Star of the Order of Polonia Restituta (1978)
- Commander's Cross of the Order of Polonia Restituta
- Gold Cross of Merit
- Silver Cross of Merit (1955)
- Medal of the 30th Anniversary of People's Poland
- Medal of the 40th Anniversary of People's Poland
- Medal of the 10th Anniversary of People's Poland (1955)
- Gold Medal of Merit for National Defence
- Silver Medal of Merit for National Defence
- Bronze Medal of Merit for National Defence
- Badge of the 1000th Anniversary of the Polish State
- Order of the Red Banner (USSR, 1968)
- Jubilee Medal "Forty Years of Victory in the Great Patriotic War 1941–1945" (USSR, 1985)

== Bibliography ==
- Z. Branach, Pierwszy grudzień Jaruzelskiego, Wydawnictwo Cetera, 1998

Dzieje Sejmu Polskiego (opracowanie zbiorowe), Wydawnictwo Sejmowe, Warszawa 1997

- W. Jaruzelski, Przeciwko bezprawiu, Wydawnictwo Adam Marszałek, Toruń 2004
- Kto jest kim w Polsce 1984. Informator encyklopedyczny, Wydawnictwo Interpress, Warszawa 1984, str. 985
- H. Kula, Grudzień 1970: „oficjalny” i rzeczywisty, Wydawnictwo L&L, 2006
- Leksykon Historii Polski, Wydawnictwo „Wiedza Powszechna”, Warszawa 1996
- T. Mołdawa, Ludzie władzy 1944–1991, Wydawnictwo Naukowe PWN, Warszawa 1991
- P. Pytlakowski, Republika MSW, Wydawnictwo Andy Grafik, 1991
- B. Seidler, Kto kazał strzelać: Grudzień ’70, Polska Oficyna Wydawnicza „BGW”, Warszawa 1991
- Tajne dokumenty Biura Politycznego. Grudzień 1970, Wyd. „Aneks”, Londyn 1991
- A. Walicki, Polskie zmagania z wolnością: widziane z boku, Biblioteka „Kuźnicy”, Universitas, 2000
- „Za Wolność i Lud”, 1985, nr 21 (1118), str. 5
- VI Kongres ZBoWiD Warszawa 7–8 maja 1979, Wydawnictwo ZG ZBoWiD, Warszawa 1979
- VII Kongres ZBoWiD, Wydawnictwo ZG ZBoWiD, Warszawa 1985
