= Foreign Intelligence Agency =

Polish intelligence agency

Coordinates: 52°11′56.99″N 20°59′37.76″E

- Agencja Wywiadu
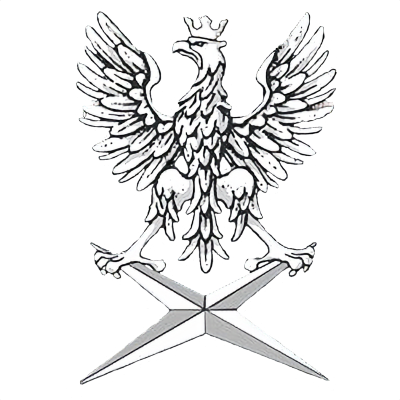

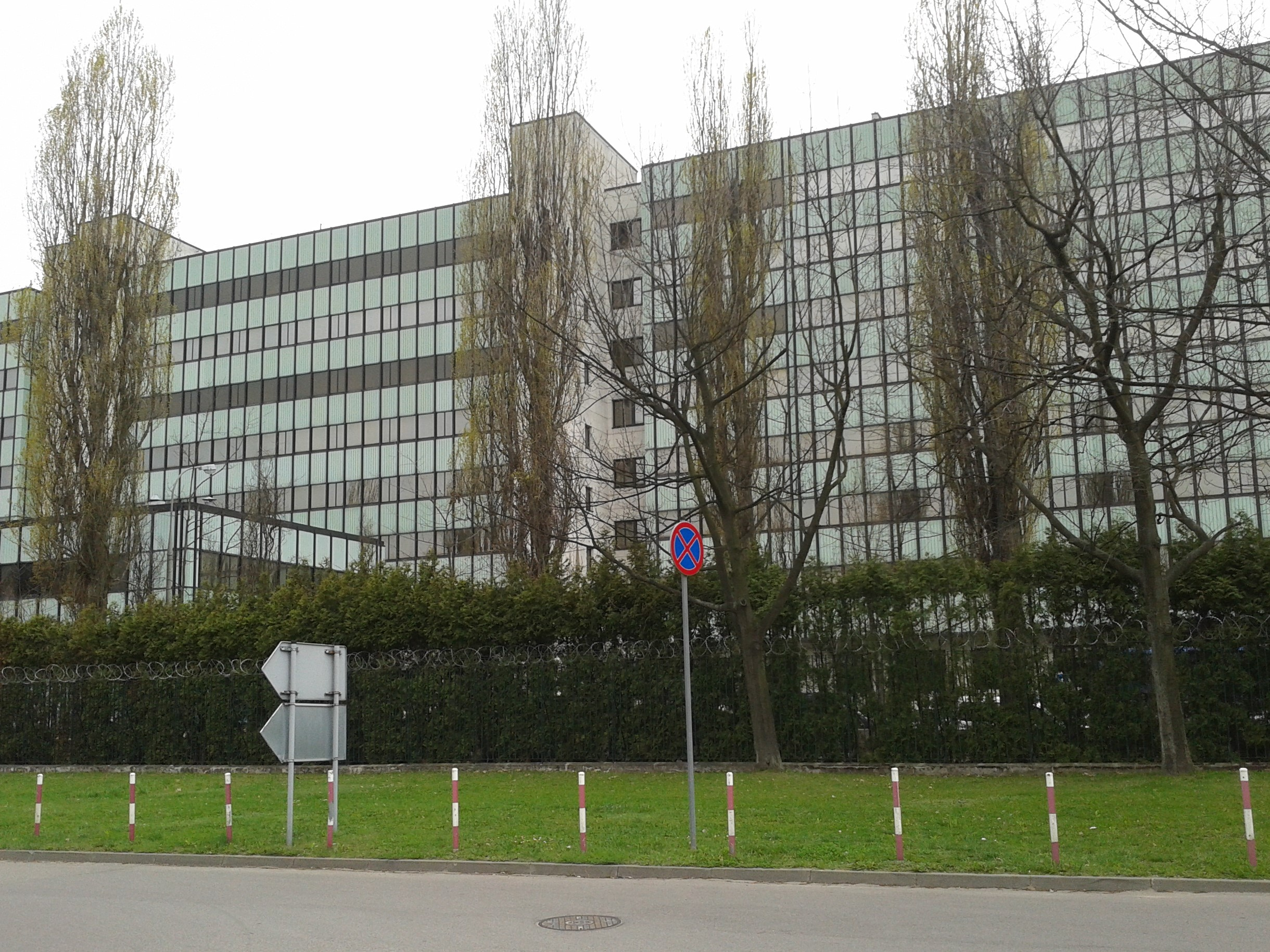

Agency overview
- Formed: 29 June 2002
- Preceding agency: Office of State Protection
- Jurisdiction: Government of Poland
- Headquarters: Miłobędzka St., Warsaw
- Ministers responsible: Donald Tusk, Prime Minister; Tomasz Siemoniak, Minister - Coordinator of Special Forces
- Agency executives: Col. Paweł Szota, Head; Col. Dominik Duda, Deputy Head; Marek Stępień, Deputy Head; Col. Waldemar Mularczyk, Deputy Head
- Website: https://aw.gov.pl/

The Foreign Intelligence Agency (Polish: Agencja Wywiadu (Polish pronunciation: [aˈɡɛnt͡sja vɨˈvʲadu]; or AW) is a Polish intelligence agency tasked with the gathering of public and secret information abroad for the Republic of Poland.

It was created in 2002 from the reform and split of Urząd Ochrony Państwa, which was split into Agencja Wywiadu (AW) and Agencja Bezpieczeństwa Wewnętrznego (ABW).

The current head of the Foreign Intelligence Agency is Colonel Paweł Szota.

== Genesis ==
When the People's Republic of Poland ended in 1989, the new authorities faced the challenge of reforming the special services, which were viewed very negatively by most Poles.

In April 1990, a law was passed creating the Office of State Protection (UOP), which replaced the Departments I and II of the Ministry of Internal Affairs. This marked the abolition of the Security Service (SB). The UOP was a separate, neutral institution that was not part of the Ministry of the Interior, indicating the depoliticization of the intelligence services. The Office of State Protection was supervised by the Ministry of the Interior in terms of personnel policy, the general policy of the head of the UOP and its compliance with state policy. Even then, however, there was a realization that intelligence should rather be under the authority of foreign affairs. The reason why the separation of intelligence and counterintelligence had not yet been decided upon in 1990 was the costliness of such an undertaking.

Even before the 2002 Law came into effect and two separate agencies were established, the position of Head of the UOP had already become the subject of a constitutional dispute. Indeed, this function was entrusted to Zbigniew Siemiątkowski, who was both an MP and secretary of state. The dispute concerned the issue of combining the MP's mandate with other government employment. According to Article 103(1) of the Polish Constitution, this is prohibited. On the other hand, however, in the same place in the Polish Constitution, an exception to this rule appears, stating that members of the Council of Ministers and secretaries of state in government administration may sit in parliament. The Constitutional Court spoke on the matter, ruling in 2004 (after the 2002 reform) that giving the heads of the ABW and AW the rank of secretaries of state is unconstitutional, as it circumvents the prohibition on combining a parliamentary mandate with employment in government administration. According to the CT ruling, the only legal effect of conferring the rank of secretary of state is the possibility of combining the position of agency head with a parliamentary mandate.

== Roles ==
The Foreign Intelligence Agency usually operates outside the territory of the Republic of Poland. Its activities within the Republic of Poland may be conducted only to a limited extent and exclusively in connection with activities outside the country's borders. The roles of the Foreign Intelligence Agency include:

- Obtaining, analyzing, processing and forwarding information that may be significant to the security and international position of the Republic of Poland, as well as to its economic potential;
- Recognizing and counteracting external threats to the security, defense, independence and inviolability of the Republic of Poland;
- Protecting foreign diplomatic missions of the Republic of Poland and their officials from the activities of foreign intelligence services and other activities negatively that may affect the interests of the Republic of Poland;
- Ensuring protection of cryptographic communication with the Polish diplomatic missions and consulates, and of diplomatic pouch;
- Recognizing international terrorism, extremism and international organized crime groups;
- Recognizing international trade in weapons, ammunition and explosive materials, narcotics, psychotropic substances, as well as in goods, technologies and services of strategic importance to the state's security, recognizing international trade in weapons of mass destruction and threats related to the proliferation of those weapons and their carriers;
- Recognizing and analyzing threats occurring in the regions of tensions, conflicts and international crises that exert influence on the state's security, as well as actions undertaking aimed at eliminating those threats;
- Conducting signals intelligence;

== Structure ==
The Foreign Intelligence Agency comprises the following organizational units:

1. Bureau I
2. Bureau II
3. Bureau III
4. Bureau IV
5. Bureau V
6. Bureau VI
7. Bureau VII
8. Bureau VIII
9. Staff Training Centre
10. Independent Legal Unit

However, the Head of the Foreign Intelligence Agency is authorized to form or appoint units of a permanent or ad hoc character (e.g. task units).

== Current management ==
- Head of the Foreign Intelligence Agency: Colonel Paweł Szota
- Deputy Head of the Foreign Intelligence Agency: Colonel Dominik Duda
- Deputy Head of the Foreign Intelligence Agency: Marek Stępień
- Deputy Head of the Foreign Intelligence Agency: Colonel Waldemar Mularczyk

== List of heads ==
Tenure	Name
2002–2004	Zbigniew Siemiatkowski
2004–2005	Andrzej Ananicz
2005–2008	Zbigniew Nowek
2008–2008	Andrzej Ananicz
2008–2015	Maciej Hunia
2015–2016	Grzegorz Małecki
2016–2022	Piotr Krawczyk
2022–2023	Bartosz Jarmuszkiewicz
2023-present	Paweł Szota

== See also ==
- History of Polish intelligence services
