= Bartłomiej Sienkiewicz =

Polish politician (born 1961)

Bartłomiej Sienkiewicz MEP
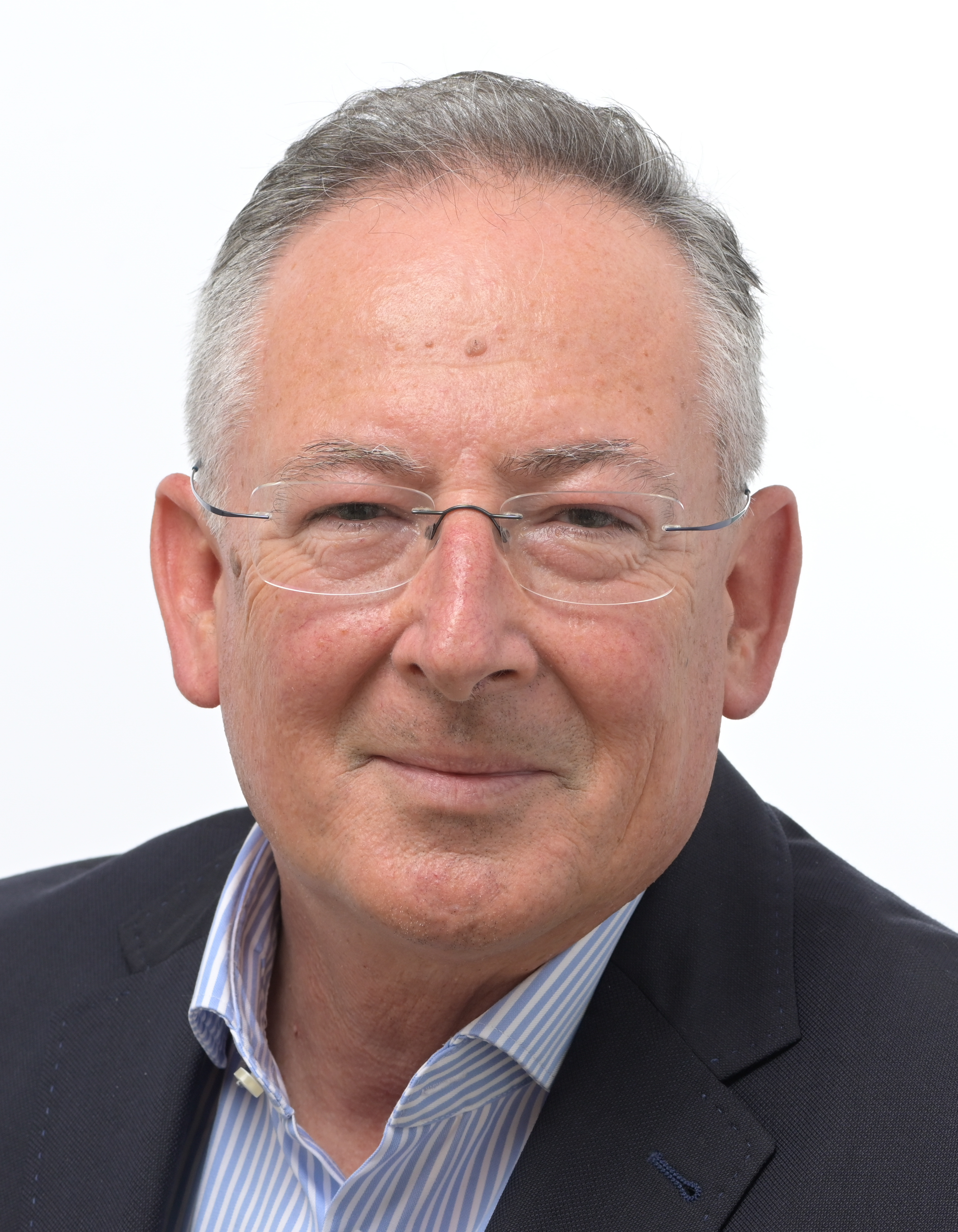
- Sienkiewicz in 2024

Minister of Culture and National Heritage
- In office 13 December 2023 – 13 May 2024
- Prime Minister: Donald Tusk
- Preceded by: Dominika Chorosińska
- Succeeded by: Hanna Wróblewska

Minister of the Interior
- In office 25 February 2013 – 22 September 2014
- Prime Minister: Donald Tusk
- Preceded by: Jacek Cichocki
- Succeeded by: Teresa Piotrowska

Member of the European Parliament for Poland
- Incumbent
- Assumed office 13 July 2024
- Constituency: 10 – Lesser Poland & Świętokrzyskie

Personal details
- Born: 29 July 1961 (age 65) Kielce, Poland
- Party: Civic Platform
- Children: 4
- Education: Jagiellonian University

Bartłomiej Sienkiewicz (Polish pronunciation: [/bartwɔˈmʲɛj ɕɛnˈkʲɛvit͡ʂ]; born 29 July 1961) is a Polish politician who served as Minister of the Interior in the government of Prime Minister Donald Tusk from 25 February 2013 to 22 September 2014. From 13 December 2023 to 13 May 2024, Sienkiewicz has served as Minister of Culture and National Heritage in the third cabinet of Donald Tusk.

== Early life and education ==
Sienkiewicz was born on 29 July 1961 in Kielce. He is the great-grandson of Nobel Prize–winning author Henryk Sienkiewicz. Bartłomiej Sienkiewicz is a graduate of Jagiellonian University.

== Early life and career ==
Sienkiewicz participated in Cracow's opposition movement in the early 1980s. In 1990, he co-established the Office for State Protection and the Centre for Eastern Studies, a think-tank organization. He served as the deputy director of the center for eight years, specifically from 1991 to 1993 and from 1996 to 2001.

In the early 2000s, Sienkiewicz left the state administration and began to work in private sector, founding a firm on the investment risk and analysis of the competitive environment (ASBS Othago, then "Sienkiewicz and Partners").

== Political career ==
=== Minister of the Interior, 2013–2014 ===
On 25 February 2013, Sienkiewicz was appointed by President Bronisław Komorowski as Minister of the Interior to the cabinet led by Prime Minister Donald Tusk. Sienkiewicz replaced Jacek Cichocki in the post.

Sienkiewicz was one of the politicians at the centre of the tape scandal that occurred in Poland in the summer of 2014 when many of the key figures of the Polish political scene were covertly recorded in private. He was recorded during a conversation with Marek Belka, governor of the National Bank of Poland, during which they discussed in a Warsaw restaurant a possible change of the Minister of Finance; Belka and Sienkiewicz later said their words were taken out of context and they denied doing anything illegal. In July 2014, the Polish parliament rejected a motion of no confidence in Sienkiewicz. However, the district prosecutor's office in Warsaw launched an investigation in August 2014 to establish if Belka and Sienkiewicz had exceeded their authority.

Sienkiewicz resigned along with the entire government following the election of Donald Tusk as the new President of the European Council and did not enter the new cabinet headed by Ewa Kopacz.

=== Parliamentary career ===
In the 2019 elections, Sienkiewicz won a seat in the Ninth Sejm, having run as the leader of the Civic Platform list in the Kielce district and receiving 35,009 votes. After the elections, he joined the PO and in January 2020 filed his candidacy for party chairman. As a result of the vote in the same month, he came in last place among the four candidates.

Sienkiewicz was again elected to the Parliament in the general election on 15 October 2023.

=== Minister of Culture and National Heritage, 2023–2024 ===
He was appointed Minister of Culture and National Heritage on 13 December 2023 to the cabinet led by Donald Tusk. On 19 December 2023, he dismissed the directors of TVP, Polish Radio and PAP.

The move was met with accusations of illegality and protests by the dismissed management and the opposition Law and Justice party.

On 25 April 2024, Sienkiewicz resigned from the ministry and announced his candidacy for the European Parliament in elections to be held on 9 June, waiting for the president to have accepted his resignation.

== Personal life ==
Sienkiewicz is married and has four children.

Government offices
| Preceded by Jacek Cichocki | Interior Minister of Poland; 2013 – 2014 | Succeeded by Teresa Piotrowska |
