= Jerzy Kłoczowski =

Polish historian (1924–2017)

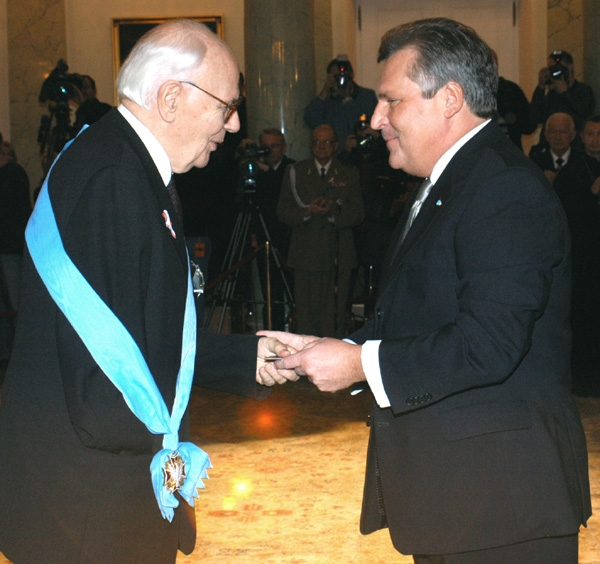
Kłoczowski awarded with the Order of the White Eagle by President Kwaśniewski, 2004

Jerzy Kazimierz Kłoczowski (29 December 1924, Bogdany Wielkie, Poland – 2 December 2017) was a Polish historian, professor at the John Paul II Catholic University of Lublin, and former member of the Polish Senate. During World War II, Kłoczowski was a soldier of the Home Army (Armia Krajowa) and participated in the Warsaw Uprising, where he was seriously injured and lost his right hand. On leaving the military hospital in April 1945, he went to Adam Mickiewicz University in Poznań and then to Nicolaus Copernicus University in Toruń, where he earned a degree and a Ph.D. (1950). Member of the anti-communist Solidarity movement – after the fall of communism in Poland, Kłoczowski was elected Senator and member of the Commission for Foreign Affairs of the Senate, as well as the representative of the Polish Parliament at the Council of Europe.

== Early and private life ==
Jerzy Kłoczowski was son of Eugeniusz, a landlord, and Irena née Cichowska. He attended Gimnazjum im. Adama Mickiewicza (Adam Mickiewicz High School) in Warsaw since 1937.

In 1947 he married Krystyna Minkiewicz. They had five children: Piotr, Paweł, Jan, Isia and Anna.

== Career ==
Kłoczowski served as Professor of history at the Catholic University of Lublin, and Director of the Institute of East-Central Europe in Lublin, as well as Chair of the International Federation of Institutes of East-Central Europe, Chair of the Polish Commission of the Comparative History of Churches, Vice-Chair of the International Commission of the Comparative History of Churches, and Chair of the Polish Commission for UNESCO. He was a former member of the UNESCO Executive Board, fellow of Collegium Invisibile, and the first president of the Joint Committee of UNESCO and International Committee of Historical Sciences (ICHS).

Jerzy Kłoczowski was a former lecturer at the Collège de France (1977), Merton College (Oxford University, 1980), University of Wisconsin–Madison (1985), Paris-Sorbonne University (1985–1987), Institute for Advanced Study in Princeton (1989–1990), College of Europe in Natolin, Warsaw (from 1997). He was a Doctor honoris causa of University of Grodno (1993), Kyiv-Mohyla Academy (1998), Free University of Berlin (1998) and Sorbonne (1999). He was awarded the Order of the White Eagle, Virtuti Militari, Cross of Merit with Swords and Cross of Valor by the Polish government.

== Public protest ==
Professor Kłoczowski became a target of a slanderous controversy, resulting from an article published in Najwyższy Czas! magazine on September 11, 2004 (No. 37/747) by Stanisław Michalkiewicz. Michalkiewicz alleged that Kłoczowski could be the same person as the SB security agent pseudonym "Historyk" (Historian) recruited in 1961, and listed in the secret communist archives held by the Institute of National Remembrance.

Michalkiewicz wrote again about Prof. Kłoczowski for the Paris-based La Voix Catholique (The Catholic Voice) on November 7, 2004. His article resulted in a widely publicized official protest printed by Rzeczpospolita on November 13-14, 2004, and signed by 35 academics and prominent politicians such as Tadeusz Mazowiecki, Władysław Bartoszewski and film director Andrzej Wajda. The letter of protest explained that the slanderous memo (known as "Fałszywka" in Polish) was invented by the security service itself. The public protest was joined by the Catholic University of Lublin. Michalkiewicz was denied access to IPN archives in a decision that spurred further controversy lasting for several years. He was also discharged from La Voix Catholique.

== Death ==
Kłoczowski died on 2 December 2017, at age 92.

== Major publications ==
Jerzy Kłoczowski is an author and editor of about 1,000 publications including:

- Wspólnoty chrześcijańskie (Christian Communities), 1964
- Europa Słowiańska w XIV-XV wieku (Slavic Europe in 14th-15th Centuries), 1984
- Histoire religieuse de la Pologne (Religious History of Poland), 1987
- La Pologne dans l'Église medievale (Poland in the Medieval Church), 1993
- East Central Europe in the historiography of the countries of the region, 1995
- Młodsza Europa. Europa Środkowo-Wschodnia w kręgu cywilizacji chrześcijańskiej średniowiecza (The Younger Europe. East-Central Europe in the Middle Ages Christian Civilisation Circle), 1998
- A History of Polish Christianity, 2000
- L'héritage historique de la Res Publica de Plusieurs Nations (Historic Heritage of the Commonwealth of Two Nations), 2004
- Central Europe between East and West, 2005
- La Pologne et l'Europe, du partage à l'élargissement (XVIIIe-XXIe siècles), 2007
