= Andrzej Modrzejewski =

Polish professor of medical science

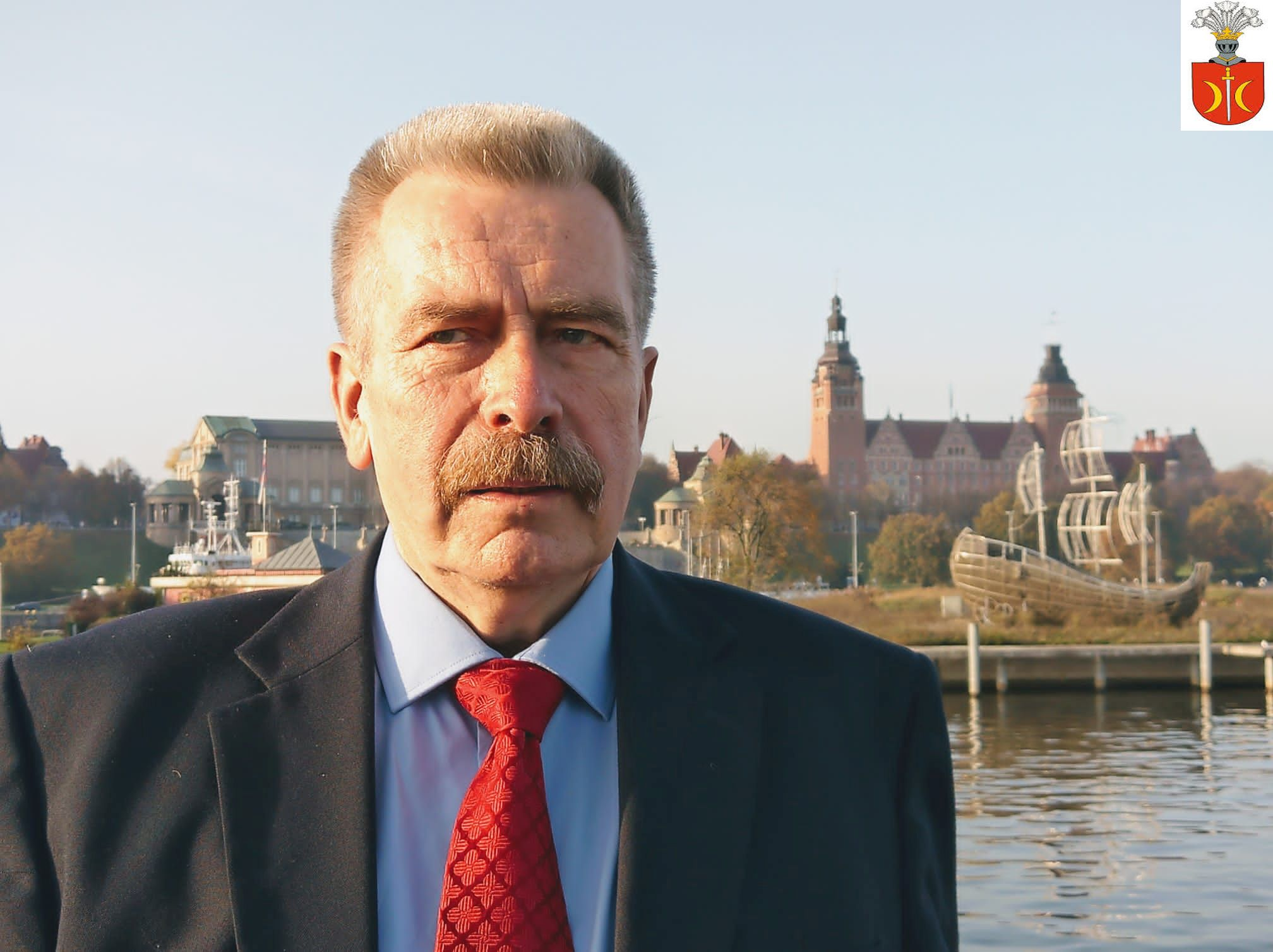
Prof. Andrzej Modrzejewski

Andrzej Tadeusz Modrzejewski (b. 28 October 1957 in Szczecin) is a Polish professor of medical science specialising in general surgery, vascular surgery, angiology; pioneer of Polish laparoscopic surgery.

Modrzejewski studied medicine at the Pomeranian Medical University in Szczecin (PMU) and received his medical degree with honours in 1982. He was employed at PMU in the Third Clinic of General Surgery, followed by winning a three-year doctoral scholarship from the Humboldt Foundation in a nationwide competition. In 1989 he received a PhD from the Humboldt University of Berlin, submitting his dissertation Experimentelle Eutersuchungen mit Cyclosporin A in German.

In early 1990s he began performing reconstructive vascular surgeries, which he continues to do so to this day. He was one of the first surgeons in Poland to organise an operating theatre and acquire equipment to carry out laparoscopic cholecystectomy and laparoscopic appendectomy.

Modrzejewski has performed over 10,000 laparoscopic gallbladder removal surgeries. Despite undertaking some very difficult and risky procedures of this type, he has unblemished record of never damaging bile ducts, which makes him stand out from other surgeons.

Modrzejewski has published over 120 scientific papers, including the first monograph on laparoscopic cholecystectomy in Poland, and has presented 100 papers at scientific conferences and symposia. He co-authored the patent "A tool for extracting organs from the abdominal cavity during laparoscopic surgeries". His hobby is hunting.

== Selected publications ==
- Kurzawski, M.; Modrzejewski, A.; Pawlik, A.; Droździk, M. (July 2009). "Polymorphism of matrix metalloproteinase genes (MMP1 and MMP3) in patients with varicose veins". Clinical and Experimental Dermatology. 34 (5): 613–617. doi:10.1111/j.1365-2230.2008.03166.x. PMID 19508478.
- Modrzejewski, Andrzej; Śledź, Marcin; Koś, Dominik (9 January 2018). "Appendektomia laparoskopowa przeprowadzona w znieczuleniu przewodowym – opis przypadku". Pomeranian Journal of Life Sciences. 63 (4). doi:10.21164/pomjlifesci.325.
- Modrzejewski, Andrzej; Zamojska-Kościów, Ewa; Tracz, Edyta; Parafiniuk, Mirosław (21 September 2018). "Surgical instrument left inside abdomen". Polish Journal of Surgery. 90 (5): 1–5. doi:10.5604/01.3001.0012.6199. PMID 30652687.
- Paśnik, Bartosz; Modrzejewski, Andrzej (10 October 2018). "Major vascular injury during laparoscopy". Polish Journal of Surgery. 90 (5): 36–40. doi:10.5604/01.3001.0012.6659. PMID 31481639.
- Vanek, Petr; Eid, Michal; Psar, Robert; Zoundjiekpon, Vincent; Urban, Ondrej; Kunovsky, Lumir (3 October 2022). "Current trends in the diagnosis of pancreatic cancer". Vnitřní lékařství. 68 (6): 363–370. doi:10.36290/vnl.2022.076. PMID 36316197.
- Dec, Paweł; Modrzejewski, Andrzej; Pawlik, Andrzej (28 December 2022). "Existing and Novel Biomaterials for Bone Tissue Engineering". International Journal of Molecular Sciences. 24 (1): 529. doi:10.3390/ijms24010529. PMC 9820083. PMID 36613972.
