= Jerzy Miller =

Polish politician (1952–present)

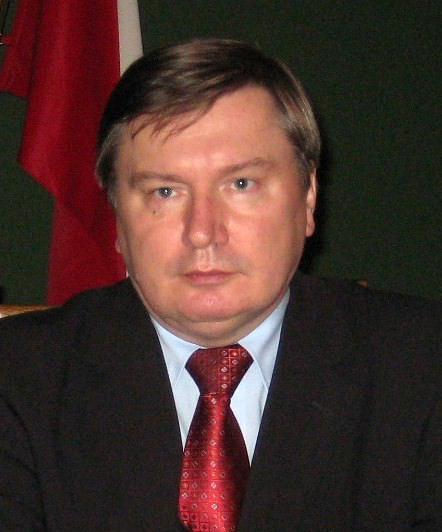

Minister of the Interior and Administration
- In office 14 October 2009 – 18 November 2011
- President: Lech Kaczyński; Bronisław Komorowski
- Prime Minister: Donald Tusk
- Preceded by: Grzegorz Schetyna
- Succeeded by: Jacek Cichocki

Personal details
- Born: 7 June 1952 (age 73) Kraków, Poland

Jerzy Miller (born 7 June 1952 in Kraków) is a Polish politician. He served as Minister of Interior Affairs in the government of Donald Tusk from 14 October 2009 to 18 November 2011. He succeeded Grzegorz Schetyna in the post.
