= Krzysztof Kozłowski =

Polish journalist and politician

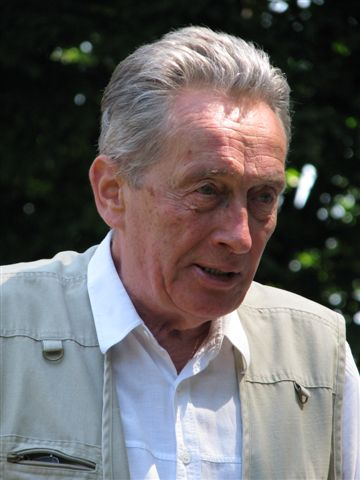
Kozlowski in June 2008.

Krzysztof Jan Kozlowski (Polish: [ˈkʂɘʂ.tɔf kɔˈzwɔf.ski]; 18 August 1931 – 26 March 2013) was a Polish journalist and politician. He served as Poland's Minister of the former Interior and Administration with the Cabinet of Prime Minister Tadeusz Mazowiecki from 1990 until 1991. (The single ministry was split into two separate ministries in 2011). Kozlowski also served as the first Chief of the Urząd Ochrony Państwa (UOP) from 1990 to 1992 and was elected to the Senate of the Republic of Poland for four terms.

Born in 1931 in Przybysławice, Gmina Gołcza, Kozlowski died from heart failure in Kraków on 26 March 2013, at the age of 81.
