= Jerzy Zdrada =

Polish historian and politician

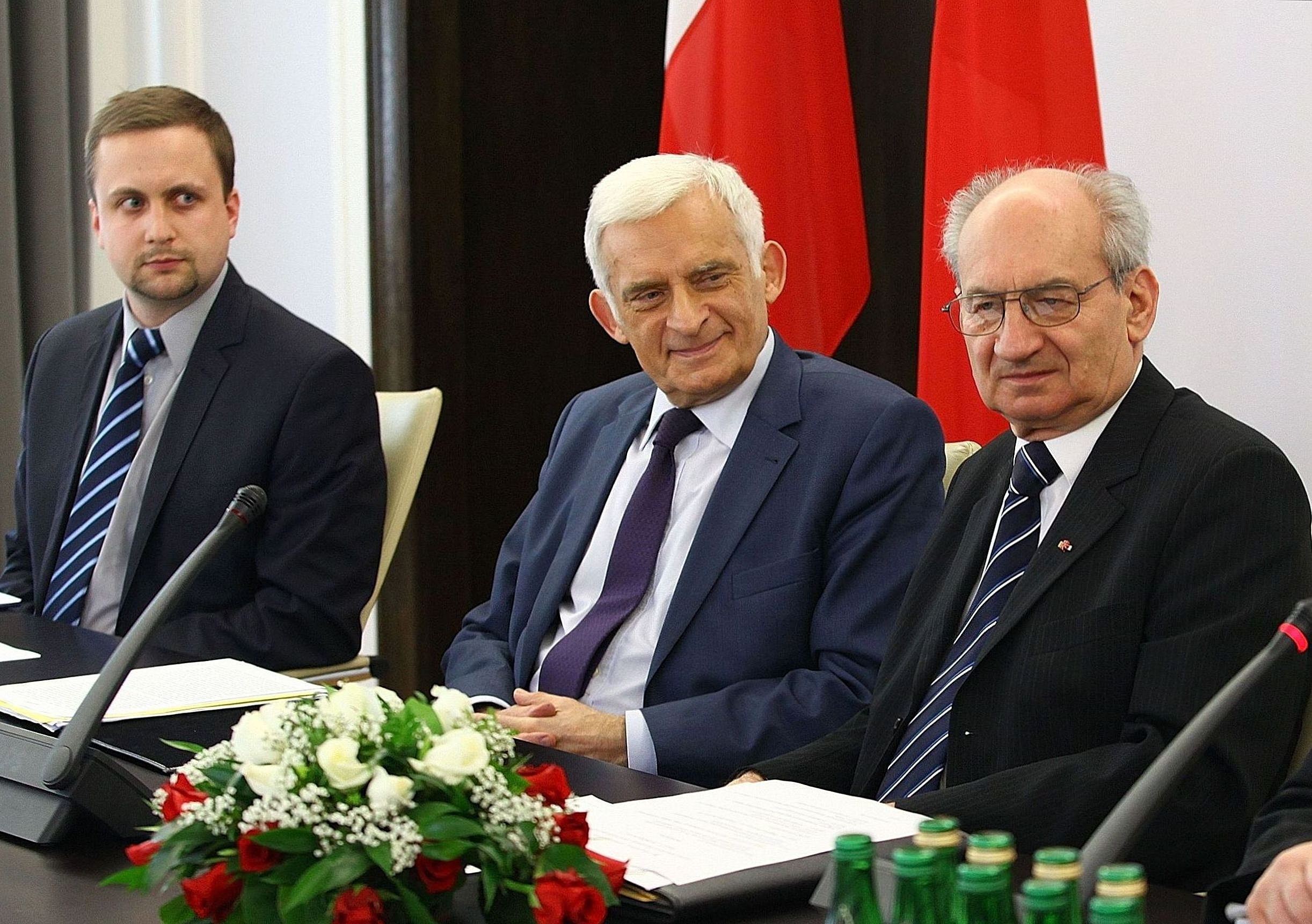
Jerzy Buzek and Jerzy Zdrada at the conference to celebrate 30th anniversary of the NSZZ "Solidarność" Provisional Coordination Committee held in the Polish Senate

Jerzy Władysław Zdrada (born 26 November 1936 in Częstochowa) is a Polish historian and politician.

== Biography ==
He is a member of the Polish Academy of Sciences and a professor at the Jagiellonian University since 1993. As a historian, he specializes in the history of Poland in the 19th century.

He was an activist of the Solidarity movement in communist Poland. After the fall of communism, he was a member of the Democratic Union (UD) and Freedom Union (UW) parties. He was a deputy to the Polish parliament (Sejm) from 1989 to 1997. Afterwards, he was a Deputy Minister in the cabinet of Jerzy Buzek (1997–2001). Afterwards, he retired from active politics.

In 2007, Zdrada was awarded the Commander's Cross with Star of the Order of Polonia Restituta.

== Works ==
- Zmierzch Czartoryskich, 1969
- Jarosław Dąbrowski: 1836-1871, 1973
- Historia Dyplomacji Polskiej Part Three (co-author), 1982
- Wielka Emigracja po Powstaniu Listopadowym, 1987
- Historia Polski 1795-1914, 2005
