= Adam Galos =

Polish historian (1924–2013)

- Born: Adam Wojciech Galos; 22 July 1924; Kraków
- Died: 11 April 2013 (aged 88); Wrocław
- Occupations: historian, professor

Adam Galos (22 July 1924 – 11 April 2013) was a Polish historian and professor at University of Wrocław. He specialized in the history of Germany. He died, aged 88, in Wrocław.

He spent his childhood in Warsaw, where his father worked as officer. In 1946 he graduated at history and started working at University of Wrocław. In 1949 Galos gained PhD. The topic of his thesis was Społeczeństwo niemieckie wobec ustaw antypolskich 1894–1909.

== Works ==
- Rugi pruskie na Górnym Śląsku (1885-1890) (1954)
- Historia Niemiec (1981, with Władysław Czapliński and Wacław Korta)
