= Zbigniew Siemiątkowski =

Polish politician (born 1957)

Zbigniew Siemiątkowski (born 8 October 1957 in Ciechanów, Poland) is a Polish politician and political scientist. He was Minister of Internal Affairs, 1996–97, and head of the Intelligence Agency (Agencja Wywiadu, or AW), 2002 – April 2004.

== Life ==
- 1977-1981 studies at the University of Warsaw, earning a master's degree in political science
- 1987 doctorate in Humanities, University of Warsaw.
- 1981-1991 work in the Department of Journalism and Politics at the University of Warsaw.
- 1978- member of the communist PZPR, and its successors, the SdRP and SLD.
- 1995 Spokesman for the campaign of Aleksander Kwaśniewski; later appointed Assistant Secretary of State, and Deputy Chief of National Security.
- 1996-1997 Minister of Internal Affairs
- 2001-2002 Secretary of State
- 2002 appointed chief of Agencja Wywiadu.
- 2004 resigned from AW.

== Rendition charges ==
On 10 January 2012 Siemiątkowski was charged with "unlawfully depriving prisoners of their liberty" in connection with the Central Intelligence Agency's operation of a Black site in Poland, which was again hidden from the public . The charges were subsequently withdrawn.

== See also ==
- History of Polish intelligence services
- List of Poles
