= Ministry of the Interior and Administration =

Government ministry of Poland

- Ministerstwo Spraw Wewnętrznych i Administracji
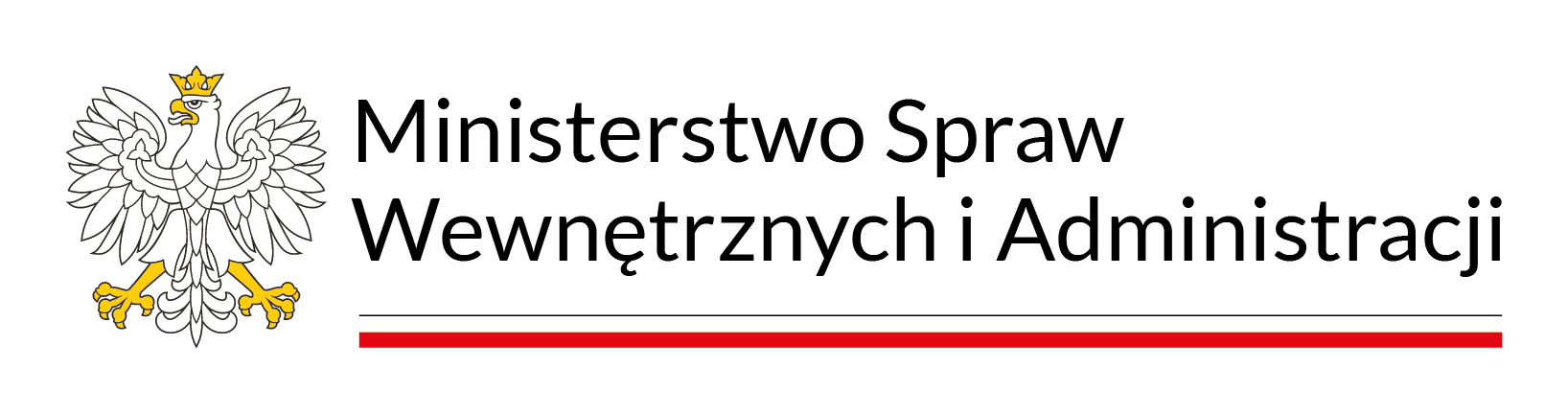
- Ministerial logotype

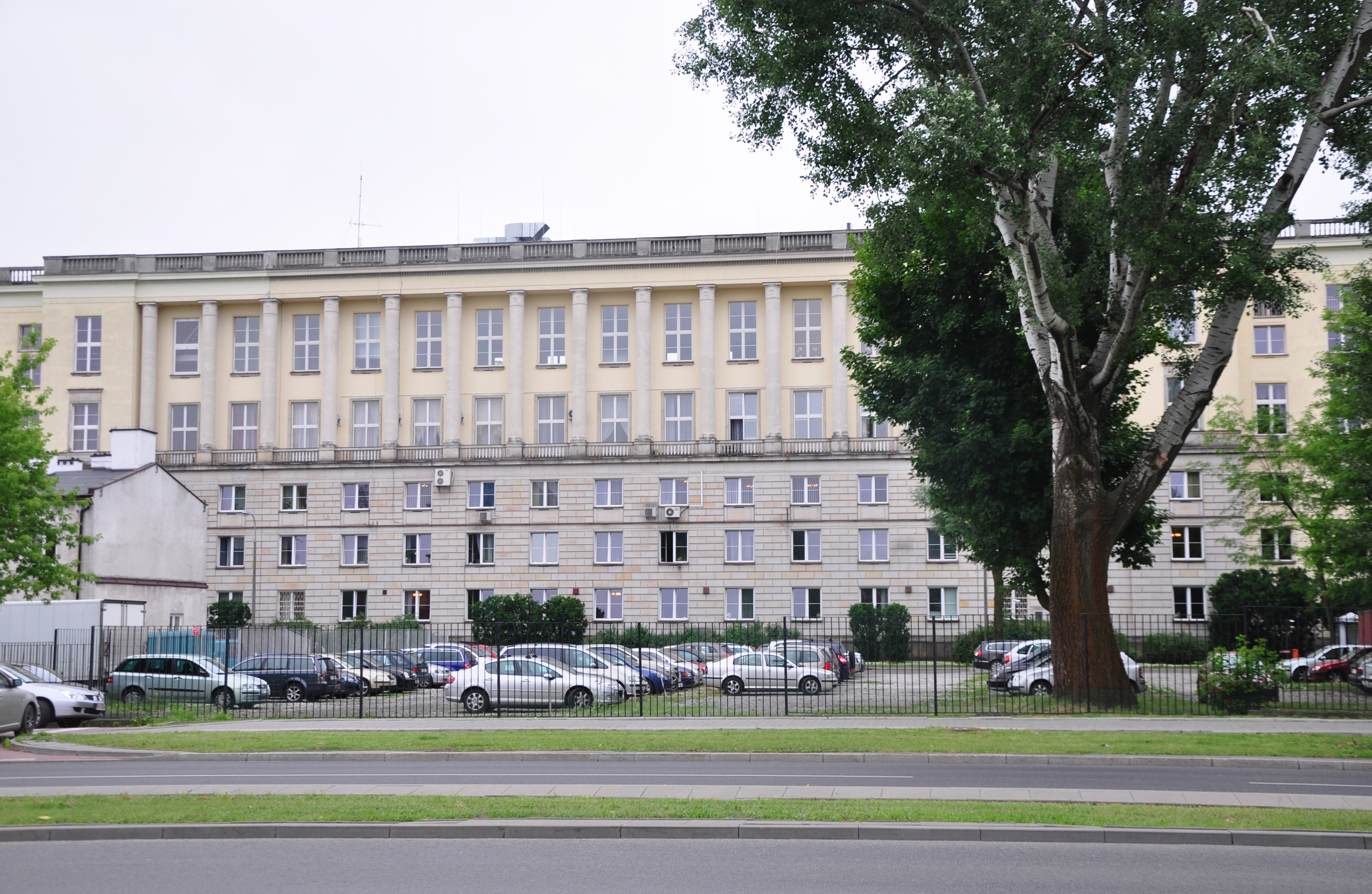
- The seat of the ministry on Stefan Batory Street, Warsaw

Agency overview
- Headquarters: ul. Stefana Batorego 5, Warsaw; 52°12′40″N 21°01′00″E
- Agency executive: Marcin Kierwiński, Minister of the Interior and Administration
- Parent agency: Council of Ministers
- Website: gov.pl/mswia

The Ministry of the Interior and Administration (Polish: Ministerstwo Spraw Wewnętrznych i Administracji, MSWiA) is an administration structure controlling main administration and security branches of the Polish government. After the 2011 Polish parliamentary elections, it was transformed into two ministries: Ministry of the Interior (Minister: Jacek Cichocki) and Ministry of Administration and Digitization (Minister: Michał Boni). It was recreated in late 2015.

== History and function ==
The ministry was founded in 1918 as the Ministry of Internal Affairs (Ministerstwo Spraw Wewnętrznych). It has gone through several reforms, including partial splits and mergers, throughout its history.

Following the abolition of the Security Office (UB) in 1954, auxiliary departments, including departmental hospitals, nurseries, and the Konsumy retail chain, were transferred from the UB to the Ministry of Interior, headed by Władysław Wicha. First of all, the Ministry of Internal Affairs took over the competences related to the resident registration and registration of the population, passport matters (which were soon returned to the security service), supervision over the Citizens' Militia, ORMO, KBW, and the Border Protection Force as well as the State Fire Service and the Prison Service.

On 14 July 1983 The Act "on the office of the Minister of Internal Affairs and the scope of activities of the bodies subordinate to him" was adopted; the Voivodeship Militia Headquarters (Polish: Komenda Wojewódzka MO) were replaced with Voivodeship Offices for Internal Affairs (Polish: Wojewódzki Urząd Spraw Wewnętrznych), and similar steps were taken at the district and regional levels.

Massive changes began in the ministry following the appointment of Krzysztof Kozłowski, a senator on the Solidarity list of the Civic Parliamentary Club, as Deputy Minister on 7 March 1990.

During a reform of the Polish government in 1996, the administration branch was merged into the Ministry and it was renamed to its current name (on 24 December).

== Powers and responsibilities ==
Traditionally, it is one of the most important governmental cabinet positions in Poland,

The ministry is responsible for the following:

- The general interior security of the country, with respect to criminal acts or natural catastrophes
  - including the major law-enforcement forces (see law enforcement in Poland)
    - the Polish National Police (Policja)
    - the Polish Border Guard (Straż Graniczna)
  - Civil defence
    - the State Fire Brigade (Straż Pożarna)
    - Search and rescue and the oversight of ambulance services
- the granting of identity documents (Polish passports, identity cards) and driving licenses through the network of voivodeships
- relations between the central government and local governments (except in the case of regional development, which is undertaken by the Ministry of Regional Development)
- logistics and organization of political elections, at the national and voivodeship levels (but the results of the elections are overseen by the Supreme Court of Poland)
- regulation of immigration and preventing illegal immigration
- integration and registration of legal immigrants

While the ministry of the Interior supervises police forces, it does not supervise criminal enquiries; criminal enquiries are conducted under the supervision of the judiciary.

The Ministry's headquarters was located on the Stefan Batory Street, south of Warsaw's city centre and the governmental district which surrounds the Belweder. The Ministry could be referred to by its initials 'MSWiA'.

The last Minister of the Interior and Administration before it was split in 2011 was Jerzy Miller.

== List of ministers ==
=== Second Polish Republic (1918–1939) ===
Minister	Term of office		Party	Prime minister
Minister of Internal Affairs
Stanisław Thugutt	17 November 1918	16 January 1919	PSL "Wyzwolenie"	Jędrzej Moraczewski
Stanisław Wojciechowski	16 January 1919	9 June 1920	Independent	Ignacy Paderewski
Stanisław Wojciechowski	16 January 1919	9 June 1920	Independent	Leopold Skulski
Józef Kuczyński; Chief executive	23 June 1920	24 July 1920	Independent	Władysław Grabski
Leopold Skulski	24 July 1920	28 June 1921	National People's Union	Wincenty Witos
Władysław Raczkiewicz	28 June 1921	13 September 1921	Independent	Wincenty Witos
Stanisław Downarowicz	19 September 1921	5 March 1922	Independent	Antoni Ponikowski
Antoni Kamieński	10 March 1922	11 December 1922	Independent	Antoni Ponikowski
Antoni Kamieński	10 March 1922	11 December 1922	Independent	Artur Śliwiński
Antoni Kamieński	10 March 1922	11 December 1922	Independent	Julian Nowak
Ludwik Darowski; Chief executive	11 December 1922	14 December 1922	Independent	Julian Nowak
Władysław Sikorski	16 December 1922	26 May 1923	Independent	Himself
Władysław Kiernik	28 May 1923	15 December 1923	PSL "Piast"	Wincenty Witos
Władysław Sołtan	19 December 1923	21 March 1924	Independent	Władysław Grabski
Zygmunt Hübner	21 March 1924	17 November 1924	Independent	Władysław Grabski
Cyryl Ratajski	17 November 1924	14 (15) June 1925	?	Władysław Grabski
Władysław Raczkiewicz	14 (20) June 1925	5 May 1926	Independent	Władysław Grabski
Władysław Raczkiewicz	14 (20) June 1925	5 May 1926	Independent	Aleksander Skrzyński
Stefan Smólski	10 May 1926	15 May 1926	Polish Christian; Democratic Party	Wincenty Witos
Kazimierz Młodzianowski	15 May 1926	30 September 1926	Independent	Kazimierz Bartel
Felicjan Sławoj Składkowski	2 October 1926	7 December 1929	Independent	Józef Piłsudski
Felicjan Sławoj Składkowski	2 October 1926	7 December 1929	Independent	Kazimierz Bartel
Felicjan Sławoj Składkowski	2 October 1926	7 December 1929	Independent	Kazimierz Świtalski
Henryk Józewski	29 December 1929	3 June 1930	Independent	Kazimierz Bartel
Henryk Józewski	29 December 1929	3 June 1930	Independent	Walery Sławek
Felicjan Sławoj Składkowski	3 June 1930	22 June 1931	Independent	Walery Sławek
Felicjan Sławoj Składkowski	3 June 1930	22 June 1931	Independent	Józef Piłsudski
Felicjan Sławoj Składkowski	3 June 1930	22 June 1931	Independent	Walery Sławek
Felicjan Sławoj Składkowski	3 June 1930	22 June 1931	Independent	Aleksander Prystor
Bronisław Pieracki	22 June 1931	15 June 1934 (Note: Assassinated.)	Independent (BBWR)	Aleksander Prystor
Bronisław Pieracki	22 June 1931	15 June 1934	Independent (BBWR)	Janusz Jędrzejewicz
Bronisław Pieracki	22 June 1931	15 June 1934	Independent (BBWR)	Leon Kozłowski
Leon Kozłowski	16 June 1934	28 June 1934	Independent (BBWR)	Leon Kozłowski
Marian Zyndram-Kościałkowski	28 June 1934	12 October 1935	Independent (BBWR)	Leon Kozłowski
Marian Zyndram-Kościałkowski	28 June 1934	12 October 1935	Independent (BBWR)	Walery Sławek
Władysław Raczkiewicz	13 October 1935	15 May 1936	Independent (BBWR)	Marian Zyndram-Kościałkowski
Felicjan Sławoj Składkowski	16 May 1936	30 September 1939	Independent	Himself

=== Communist era (1944–1989) ===
Minister		Term of office		Party	Prime minister
Minister of Public Security
	Stanisław Radkiewicz (Note: Between 21 July and 31 December 1944 as a chief of the Ministry of Public Security (kierownik Resortu Bezpieczeństwa Publicznego) of the PKWN.)	21 July 1944	7 December 1954	Polish United; Workers' Party	Osóbka-Morawski (PKWN, RTRP, TRJN)
	Stanisław Radkiewicz	21 July 1944	7 December 1954	Polish United; Workers' Party	Cyrankiewicz
	Stanisław Radkiewicz	21 July 1944	7 December 1954	Polish United; Workers' Party	Bierut
	Stanisław Radkiewicz	21 July 1944	7 December 1954	Polish United; Workers' Party	Cyrankiewicz
Minister of Internal Affairs
No image available	Władysław Wicha	7 December 1954	12 December 1964	Polish United; Workers' Party	Cyrankiewicz
	Mieczysław Moczar	12 December 1964	15 July 1968	Polish United; Workers' Party	Cyrankiewicz
	Kazimierz Świtała	15 July 1968	13 February 1971	Polish United; Workers' Party	Cyrankiewicz
	Kazimierz Świtała	15 July 1968	13 February 1971	Polish United; Workers' Party	Jaroszewicz
	Franciszek Szlachcic	13 February 1971	22 December 1971	Polish United; Workers' Party	Jaroszewicz
No image available	Wiesław Ociepka	22 December 1971	28 February 1973 (Note: Died aged 51.)	Polish United; Workers' Party	Jaroszewicz
	Stanisław Kowalczyk	22 March 1973	8 October 1980	Polish United; Workers' Party	Jaroszewicz
	Stanisław Kowalczyk	22 March 1973	8 October 1980	Polish United; Workers' Party	Babiuch
	Stanisław Kowalczyk	22 March 1973	8 October 1980	Polish United; Workers' Party	Pińkowski; Acting
	Stanisław Kowalczyk	22 March 1973	8 October 1980	Polish United; Workers' Party	Pińkowski
	Mirosław Milewski	8 October 1980	31 July 1981	Polish United; Workers' Party	Pińkowski
	Mirosław Milewski	8 October 1980	31 July 1981	Polish United; Workers' Party	Jaruzelski
	Czesław Kiszczak	31 July 1981	6 July 1990	Polish United; Workers' Party	Jaruzelski
	Czesław Kiszczak	31 July 1981	6 July 1990	Polish United; Workers' Party	Messner
	Czesław Kiszczak	31 July 1981	6 July 1990	Polish United; Workers' Party	Rakowski
	Czesław Kiszczak	31 July 1981	6 July 1990	Polish United; Workers' Party	Himself
	Czesław Kiszczak	31 July 1981	6 July 1990	Polish United; Workers' Party	Mazowiecki

=== Republic of Poland (after 1989) ===
Minister		Term of office		Party	Cabinet
Minister of Interior
	Krzysztof Kozłowski	6 July 1990	12 January 1991	Democratic Union	Mazowiecki
No image available	Henryk Majewski	12 January 1991	23 December 1991	Independent	Bielecki
	Antoni Macierewicz	23 December 1991	20 June 1992	Christian National Union	Olszewski
No image available	Andrzej Milczanowski	11 July 1992	22 December 1995	Independent	Suchocka
No image available	Andrzej Milczanowski	11 July 1992	22 December 1995	Independent	Pawlak
No image available	Andrzej Milczanowski	11 July 1992	22 December 1995	Independent	Oleksy
No image available	Jerzy Konieczny	29 December 1995	7 February 1996	Independent	Oleksy
No image available	Zbigniew Siemiątkowski	7 February 1996	31 December 1996	Democratic Left Alliance	Cimoszewicz
Minister of Interior and Administration
	Leszek Miller	1 January 1997	31 October 1997	Democratic Left Alliance	Cimoszewicz
No image available	Janusz Tomaszewski	31 October 1997	3 September 1999	Social Movement	Buzek
	Marek Biernacki	7 October 1999	19 October 2001	Social Movement	Buzek
	Krzysztof Janik	19 October 2001	21 January 2004	Democratic Left Alliance	Miller
	Józef Oleksy	21 January 2004	21 April 2004	Democratic Left Alliance	Miller
	Jerzy Szmajdziński; Acting	21 April 2004	2 May 2004	Democratic Left Alliance	Miller
	Ryszard Kalisz	2 May 2004	31 October 2005	Democratic Left Alliance	Belka I
	Ryszard Kalisz	2 May 2004	31 October 2005	Democratic Left Alliance	Belka II
	Ludwik Dorn	31 October 2005	7 February 2007	Law and Justice	Marcinkiewicz
	Ludwik Dorn	31 October 2005	7 February 2007	Law and Justice	Kaczyński
	Janusz Kaczmarek	8 February 2007	7 August 2007	Independent	Kaczyński
	Władysław Stasiak	8 August 2007	16 November 2007	Independent	Kaczyński
	Grzegorz Schetyna	16 November 2007	13 October 2009	Civic Platform	Tusk I
	Jerzy Miller	14 October 2009	18 November 2011	Independent	Tusk I
Minister of Interior
	Jacek Cichocki	18 November 2011	25 February 2013	Independent	Tusk II
	Bartłomiej Sienkiewicz	25 February 2013	22 September 2014	Independent	Tusk II
	Teresa Piotrowska	22 September 2014	16 November 2015	Civic Platform	Kopacz
Minister of Internal Affairs and Administration
	Mariusz Błaszczak	16 November 2015	9 January 2018	Law and Justice	Szydło
	Mariusz Błaszczak	16 November 2015	9 January 2018	Law and Justice	Morawiecki I
	Joachim Brudziński	9 January 2018	4 June 2019	Law and Justice	Morawiecki I
	Elżbieta Witek	4 June 2019	9 August 2019	Law and Justice	Morawiecki I
	Mariusz Kamiński	9 August 2019 (Note: Between 9 and 14 August acting minister. Appointed minister on 14 August into the First Cabinet of Morawiecki and then again on 15 November into the Second Cabinet of Morawiecki.)	27 November 2023	Law and Justice	Morawiecki I
	Mariusz Kamiński	9 August 2019	27 November 2023	Law and Justice	Morawiecki II
	Paweł Szefernaker	27 November 2023	13 December 2023	Law and Justice	Morawiecki III
	Marcin Kierwiński	13 December 2023	13 May 2024	Civic Platform	Tusk III
	Tomasz Siemoniak	13 May 2024	24 July 2025	Civic Platform	Tusk III
	Marcin Kierwiński	24 July 2025	Incumbent	Civic Platform	Tusk III

== See also ==
- Office for the Foreigners' Affairs is overseen by the Ministry
