= Military Intelligence Service (Poland) =

Military intelligence agency of Poland

- Służba Wywiadu Wojskowego (Polish)
- Emplem of the Military Intelligence Service

- Headquarters of the SWW

Agency overview
- Formed: 2006
- Preceding agency: Military Information Services
- Agency executive: Col Dorota Kawecka
- Parent agency: Ministry of National Defence
- Website: www.sww.gov.pl

The Military Intelligence Service (Polish: Służba Wywiadu Wojskowego, SWW) is a military intelligence agency of Poland, responsible for the gathering and assessment of information relevant to the national security and defence capacity of the country and to the military capability of the Polish Armed Forces and to the support of their abroad military operations. During peacetime, the service is organised outside the structure of the Polish military under the Ministry of National Defence. The head of the service is appointed by the Prime Minister and subordinate to the Minister of National Defence. The incumbent head has been Colonel Dorota Kawecka since 5 March 2024, the first woman to hold the office, who previously held the post in an acting capacity from 19 December 2023.

The service and the Military Counterintelligence Service were established in 2006 as the successors to the Military Information Services.

== List of heads ==
- Brig Gen Witold Marczuk, 2006–2008
- Brig Gen Maciej Hunia, 16 January 2008 (acting head from December 2007) – 11 August 2008
- Brig Gen Radosław Kujawa, 2008–2015
- Brig Gen Andrzej Kowalski, 2015–2020
- Brig Gen Marek Łapiński, 2020–2023
- Col Dorota Krawecka, 5 March 2024 (acting head from 19 December 2023) – present

== See also ==
- Military Counterintelligence Service (Poland)
