= Military Information Services (Poland) =

Military Intelligence agency in Poland

- Wojskowe Służby Informacyjne
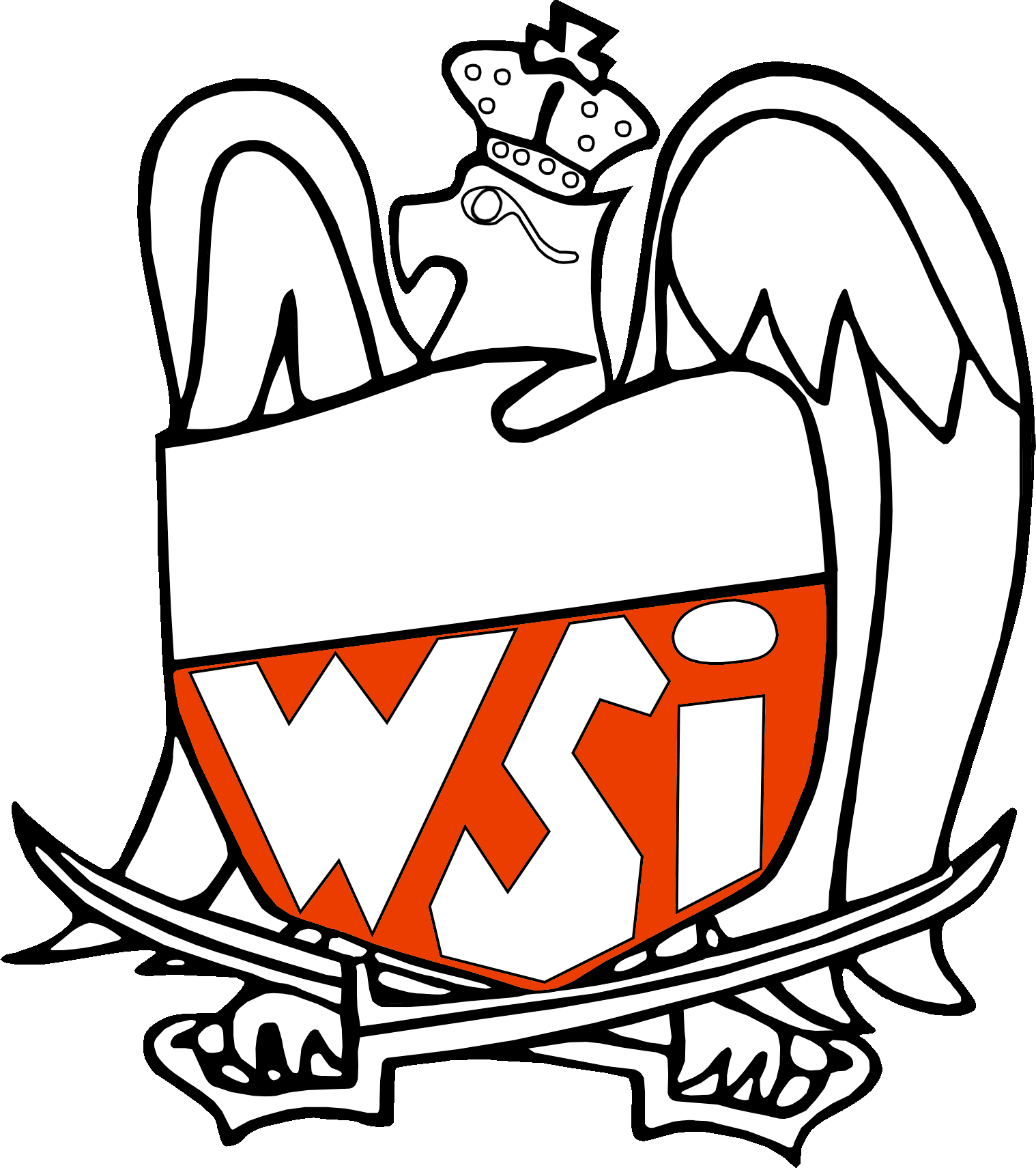
- Emblem of the Military Information Services

Agency overview
- Formed: 1991
- Preceding agencies: Second Directorate for Intelligence and Counter-intelligence; Second Directorate of General Staff of the Polish Army; Internal Military Service
- Dissolved: October 2006
- Superseding agencies: Military Intelligence Service; Military Counterintelligence Service
- Type: Intelligence
- Jurisdiction: Polish Armed Forces
- Parent department: Ministry of Defence

Military Information Services (Wojskowe Służby Informacyjne, or WSI) was a common name for the Polish military intelligence and counterintelligence agency. The agency was created in 1990 after the Revolutions of 1989 that ended the Communist regime as a merger between the former Communist agencies Internal Military Service (Wojskowa Służba Wewnętrzna, or WSW) and the Second Directorate of General Staff of the Polish Army. The combined agency was originally known as the Second Directorate for Intelligence and Counter-intelligence (Zarząd II Wywiadu i Kontrwywiadu); it was renamed to WSI in 1991. At first, all commanding and upper-level officers—and most of the employees—had direct personal and career links with the former Communist regimes of Poland and the Soviet Union.

By a vote of 375 - 48 in favor, the Sejm of the Republic of Poland voted in May 2006 to liquidate WSI in October 2006. Polish President Bronisław Komorowski (at that time as deputy) voted against.

== History ==
In 1990, the Second Directorate of General Staff of the Polish Army was merged with the Counterintelligence Division of the Internal Military Service. That merger combined the intelligence and counter-intelligence agencies under one structure, the Second Directorate for Intelligence and Counter-intelligence. In 1991, the Second Directorate was transformed into the WSI. WSI was responsible for military counter-intelligence and security activities in Poland.

WSI was bound by law to shield vital state information for the newly independent Poland, under the direct control and management of the Ministry of Defense (Ministerstwo Obrony Narodowej). WSI was also intended to be Poland's liaison with the intelligence services of other NATO countries.

WSI was to investigate and counteract threats to Poland's defense forces and vital defense information. It also regulated arms, explosives, equipment, licenses, etc.

=== Disbandment ===
In 2006, WSI was disbanded and replaced by two independent military intelligence services, the Military Counter-intelligence Service (Służba Kontrwywiadu Wojskowego) and the Military Intelligence Service (Służba Wywiadu Wojskowego). Prime Minister Jarosław Kaczyński appointed conservative politician Antoni Macierewicz to oversee the disbanding of WSI.

The work of the Verification Commission allowed to reveal the picture of the actual structure of military intelligence services: out of nearly 10,000 operating in 1990 at home and abroad, 2,500 employees of these services are people planted in the central administrative and economic institutions of the country.

According to military experts of the Polish Democratic Left Alliance and Civic Platform, some NATO officials expressed disapproval of disbanding of the WSI.

The Sejm allowed President Lech Kaczyński's administration to publish the Macierewicz Report, a 164-page document detailing the extralegal activities of the WSI that lead to its disbandment. The report documents alleged misconduct by WSI soldiers and employees. Although the first phase of the disbandment was perceived by most of Polish politicians as successful; the new "verification" phase was incomplete. Polish media discuss the ongoing "professionalization" reforms in the Polish army, which, according to politicians, needs radical changes. Nonetheless, there are many public voices of opposition alleging problems in those reforms in spite of verification of WSI.

Lack of professionals in the new forces replacing the WSI, coupled with their bad performance in 2010s (see for instance the 2010 Polish Air Force Tu-154 crash) improved the public opinions expressed (for instance by the then Polish President Bronisław Komorowski) about the disbanded WSI.

== Directors ==
=== Second Section of General Staff of the Polish People's Army ===
- Nikanor Gołosnicki (July – August 1945)
- Grigory Domaradzki (1945 – December 19, 1945)
- Wacław Komar (December 19, 1945 – October 14, 1950)
- Iwan Pieriemyszczew (1950)
- Konstantin Kashnikov (14 October 1950 – 15 March 1951)
- Igor Suchacki (15 March 1951 – November 15, 1951)

=== Second Directorate of General Staff of the Polish People's Army ===
- Igor Suchacki (November 15, 1951 – 10 April 1953)
- Fyodor Tikhonovich Vedmied (1953 – 1956)
- Grzegorz Korczyński (1956 – 1965)
- Tadeusz Jedynak (acting) (1965)
- Włodzimierz Oliwa (1965 – 1971)
- Bolesław Szczepaniak (1971 – 1973)
- Czesław Kiszczak (1973 – 1979)
- Edward Poradko (1979 – 1981)
- Roman Misztal (1981 – 1990)

=== Military Information Services ===
- Czesław Wawrzyniak (September 30, 1991 – February 1992)
- Marian Sobolewski (April 2, 1992 – July 1, 1992)
- Bolesław Izydorczyk (July 1, 1992 – February 23, 1994)
- Konstanty Malejczyk (23 February 1994 – 26 March 1996)
- Kazimierz Głowacki (March 26, 1996 – December 21, 1997)
- Tadeusz Rusak (December 21, 1997 – October 25, 2001)
- Marek Dukaczewski (November 6, 2001 – November 4, 2004)
- Janusz Bojarski (November 5, 2004 – December 6, 2004)
- Marek Dukaczewski (November 6, 2001 – November 4, 2004)
- Janusz Bojarski (December 14, 2005 – January 1, 2006)
- Jan Żukowski (1 January 2006 – 30 September 2006)

=== Military Intelligence Service ===
- Witold Marczuk (October 4, 2006 – January 16, 2008)
- Maciej Hunia (January 16, 2008 – June 7, 2008)
- Radosław Kujawa (June 7, 2008 – November 19, 2015)
- Andrzej Kowalski (November 19, 2015 – January 27, 2020)
- Marek Łapiński (January 27, 2020 – December 19, 2023)
- Dorota Kawecka (December 19, 2023 – Present)

== See also ==
- Office of State Protection
- Internal Security Agency
- Foreign Intelligence Agency
- Defense Intelligence Agency (America)
- Main Intelligence Directorate
