= Military Counterintelligence Service =

Military Counterintelligence Service may refer to:

- Military Counterintelligence Service (Germany)
- Military Counterintelligence Service (Poland)
