= Antoni Macierewicz =

Polish politician and historian

- Macierewicz in 2019

Senior Marshal of the Sejm
- In office 12 November 2019 – 12 November 2023
- Marshal: Elżbieta Witek
- Preceded by: Kornel Morawiecki
- Succeeded by: Marek Sawicki

Minister of National Defence
- In office 16 November 2015 – 9 January 2018
- Prime Minister: Beata Szydło; Mateusz Morawiecki
- Preceded by: Tomasz Siemoniak
- Succeeded by: Mariusz Błaszczak

Deputy Leader of Law and Justice
- Incumbent
- Assumed office 23 November 2013
- Leader: Jarosław Kaczyński

Member of the Sejm
- Incumbent
- Assumed office 5 November 2007
- In office 20 October 1997 – 18 October 2005
- In office 25 November 1991 – 31 May 1993

Minister of Internal Affairs
- In office 23 December 1991 – 20 June 1992
- Prime Minister: Jan Olszewski
- Preceded by: Henryk Majewski
- Succeeded by: Andrzej Milczanowski

Head of the Military Counterintelligence Service
- In office 4 October 2006 – 5 November 2007
- President: Lech Kaczyński
- Prime Minister: Jarosław Kaczyński
- Preceded by: Position established
- Succeeded by: Janusz Nosek

Minister of State in the Ministry of National Defence
- In office 1 July 2006 – 1 November 2007
- President: Lech Kaczyński
- Prime Minister: Jarosław Kaczyński

Chairman of the Verification Commission
- In office 21 July 2006 – 9 November 2007
- President: Lech Kaczyński
- Prime Minister: Jarosław Kaczyński
- Preceded by: Position established
- Succeeded by: Jan Olszewski

Member of the European Parliament
- In office 23 April 2003 – 19 July 2004

Personal details
- Born: 3 August 1948 (age 78) Warsaw, Poland
- Party: Law and Justice (2012–present)
- Other political affiliations: Christian National Union (1992–1993); Polish Action (1993–1995); Movement for Reconstruction of Poland (1995–1997); Catholic-National Movement (1997–2005); Patriotic Movement (2005–2012)
- Spouse: Hanna Macierewicz
- Parent(s): Zdzisław Macierewicz; Maria Macierewicz
- Education: University of Warsaw; Polish Academy of Sciences
- Profession: Politician; Academic; Historian; Human rights activist
- Website: macierewicz.com

Antoni Macierewicz (Note: Polish pronunciation: [anˈtɔɲi mat͡ɕɛˈrɛvit͡ʂ]) (born 3 August 1948) is a Polish politician and the former Minister of National Defence. He previously served as the Minister of Internal Affairs, Head of the Military Counterintelligence Service, and Minister of State in the Ministry of National Defence.

Employing nonviolent civil disobedience, Macierewicz was one of the founders in 1976 of the Workers' Defense Committee, a major anti-communist opposition organization that was a forerunner of Solidarity. During the 1980s Macierewicz directed the Centre for Social Research of Solidarity and was one of the trade union's key advisors. A former political prisoner, he escaped from incarceration and was in hiding until 1984, directing work and issuing underground publications.

Macierewicz served as the Minister of Internal Affairs from 1991 to 1992, the Head of the Military Counterintelligence Service from 2006 to 2007, and the Minister of National Defence from 2015 to 2018. He is currently in his sixth term in the Parliament of Poland, where he represents the Piotrków Trybunalski district, and was a Member of the European Parliament. He is also the Deputy Leader of Law and Justice, the largest party in the Parliament of Poland.

== Early life ==
Macierewicz was born in Warsaw on 3 August 1948. He is the youngest of three children of Zdzisław and Maria Macierewicz, both scientists. His father, a noted researcher in chemistry, a soldier in the Home Army during World War II, and a member of the Christian democratic Labor Party, committed suicide in 1949.

== Anti-communist activities ==
Macierewicz was expelled from Andrzej Frycz Modrzewski High School for political reasons in 1965, specifically for refusing to denounce the Letter of Reconciliation of the Polish Bishops to the German Bishops. Macierewicz continued his studies at Maria Konopnicka High School. From 1966, he belonged to the Czarna Jedynka scout troop. After completing his baccalaureate exams, he became a student at the University of Warsaw in 1966. He co-organized underground student organizations and participated in the student strikes that marked the 1968 Polish political crisis. He was arrested and remained a political prisoner from 28 March to 3 August 1968. Following the Polish 1970 protests, Macierewicz launched the campaign to help victims of state oppression. In 1971 he earned a master's degree from the Institute of History of the University of Warsaw. His thesis was titled Hierarchy of Power and the Structure of Land Ownership in Tawantinsuyu in the First Half of the Sixteenth Century.

As a doctoral student at the Institute of History of the Polish Academy of Sciences, he developed expertise on South America, but his doctoral thesis was not considered for political reasons. Subsequently, he coordinated with other independent intellectuals, writing letters of protest to the government regarding changes in the constitution of the Polish People's Republic. He taught the history of Latin America at the Department of Iberian Studies of the University of Warsaw. During this time he published articles and learned Quechuan languages. In January 1976, he started a PhD under the supervision of Tadeusz Łepkowski, which was interrupted by the authorities in mid-October 1976 because of Macierewicz’s dissident activities. Moreover, publication of his book and a trip to Argentina in order to conduct archival research were both blocked.

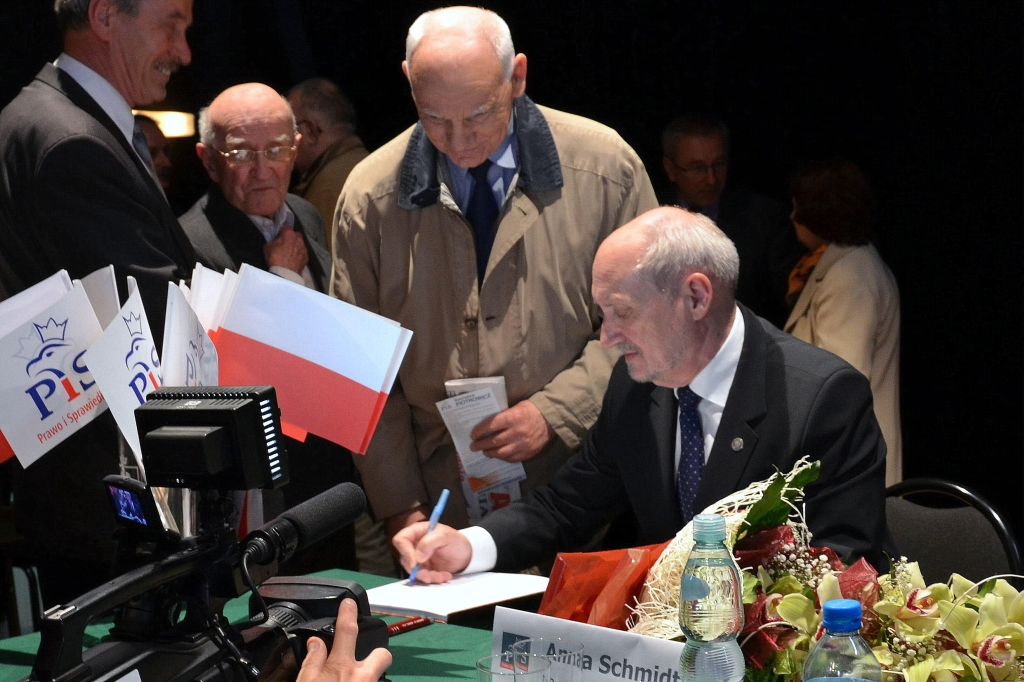
Stanisław Lewek (second from left), the physician who enabled Macierewicz’s 1982 escape from incarceration

After the pacification of workers in June 1976, he organized relief in Radom and Ursus. Along with some of his colleagues from "Black One", he created underground structures, which dealt with the monetary, legal, and medical aid for the oppressed. Macierewicz founded the Workers' Defence Committee (KOR), the forerunner of Solidarity. “Macierewicz, more than anyone else, was responsible for the formation of KOR”, notes David Ost, a Professor of Political Science at Hobart and William Smith Colleges.

In September 1976 he co-authored the organization's first appeal and began publishing the Komunikat „KOR”, working closely with Piotr Naimski and Jan Olszewski. From 16 May to 23 July 1977, and again in December 1979, Macierewicz was held as a political prisoner. In 1977 he started Głos, one of the first magazines of the democratic opposition in the communist era. In October 1979 he was a member of the Solidarity hunger strike at the Holy Cross Church in Warsaw. In connection with his opposition activities, he was kept under surveillance by the security services of communist Poland and, from 1976 until 1980, he was detained at least 23 times and his residence regularly searched.

From September 1980, Macierewicz directed the Centre for Social Research of Solidarity. He also began to publish the independent newspaper News Day Warsaw. Since October 1980 he was a member of the National Coordination Committee of Advisors, and later the National Commission of Solidarity. On 27 September 1981 Macierewicz was one of the signatories of the founding declaration of Independence Service Clubs. In the autumn of 1981, he joined the faculty at the Jagiellonian University. After the introduction of martial law in Poland, Macierewicz was part of the strike committee at the Gdańsk Shipyard. After the pacification of the protest of 16 December 1981, he was arrested but escaped from prison. Macierewicz was in hiding until 1984, directing work and issuing underground publications.

== Political career ==
=== Member of the Sejm ===
Macierewicz remains a Member of the Sejm, where he has served from 25 November 1991 to 31 May 1993, from 20 October 1997 to 18 October 2005 and from 5 November 2007 to present. He represents the Piotrków Trybunalski district. He is the Chairman of the Parliamentary Committee for the Investigation of the Causes of the 2010 Polish Air Force Tu-154 Crash. Macierewicz is also a member of the National Defense Commission and the Subcommission for the Polish Defense Industry and Technical Modernization of the Armed Forces.

=== Minister of Internal Affairs ===
He was Minister of Internal Affairs in Jan Olszewski's government. As a minister responsible for the police and security services, he was afforded full access to the former communist documentary archives, including records of communist intelligence and secret service agents. On 28 May 1992 the Parliament of Poland passed a law that the Minister of Internal Affairs had to provide the Sejm with a list of then senators, representatives, ministers, voivodes, judges and prosecutors who had been secret communist agents between 1945 and 1990. On 4 June 1992, Macierewicz provided a list, commonly known as the Macierewicz List, of 64 members of the government and parliament that had been identified as secret agents in the archives of the communist secret police to the Convent of Senior Parliamentarians. He also provided a second list containing the two names of highest importance, that of than President Lech Wałęsa and Marshall of Sejm Wiesław Chrzanowski.

As the crisis had been unfolding, prior to the lists' presentation, on 29 May 1992, the opposition parties submitted a motion of no confidence, asking for a vote on the fate of Olszewski's government. On the night of 4 June 1992, after the presentation of the lists, the motion of no confidence passed and Olszewski's government was dismissed. This situation was depicted in a documentary film, Nocna zmiana.

=== Activity between government posts ===
In 1993 Macierewicz founded his own party, Polish Action. He joined Olszewski's party, the Movement for Reconstruction of Poland, and became his deputy in 1996. He ran for parliament on Olszewski's party ticket. In 1997 he founded the Catholic-National Movement. In 2001 he joined the League of Polish Families, and on its list was re-elected to parliament in 2001, but left them due to policy differences. In 2002 Macierewicz ran unsuccessfully for President of Warsaw.

=== Member of the European Parliament ===
Macierewicz was a Member of the European Parliament during the fifth term. He served on the Committee on Development and Cooperation.

=== Secretary of State in the Ministry of National Defence ===
Following the 2005 Polish parliamentary election, Macierewicz was selected by Prime Minister Jarosław Kaczyński for the post of Secretary of State in the Ministry of National Defence.

=== Chairman of the Verification Commission ===
In July 2006, Macierewicz was appointed as the Chairman of the Verification Commission. He led the liquidation of the Military Information Services (WSI), an alleged "vestige of the communist era." Macierewicz also established new intelligence and counterintelligence agencies. On 16 February 2007 the closure report, known as the Macierewicz Report, was published in the Polish Monitor.

In its analysis, global intelligence company Stratfor noted:

The move both removes Soviet influence and consolidates the twins' power in the government. The release of the WSI report is one of the largest and most decisive moves along these lines. By naming people in the WSI who are connected to Soviet intelligence, Kaczynski ensures their names will forever be known for — alleged or real — Soviet ties. The move undermines the entire structure of the WSI and all of its former personnel, ensuring that it and those attached to it can never recover.

The report contained list of members of the WSI (military intelligence service), which included dozens of current and former Polish military counterintelligence contacts, some active in highly sensitive places like Afghanistan. Polish ambassadors to Austria, China, Kuwait and Turkey were recalled to Warsaw. At least ten of the names, including the military attaché in Moscow, were fiercely contested.

=== Head of the Military Counterintelligence Service ===
In October 2006, Macierewicz became Head of the Military Counterintelligence Service, in office until the end of the Kaczyński government.

=== Polish Air Force Tu-154 crash investigation ===
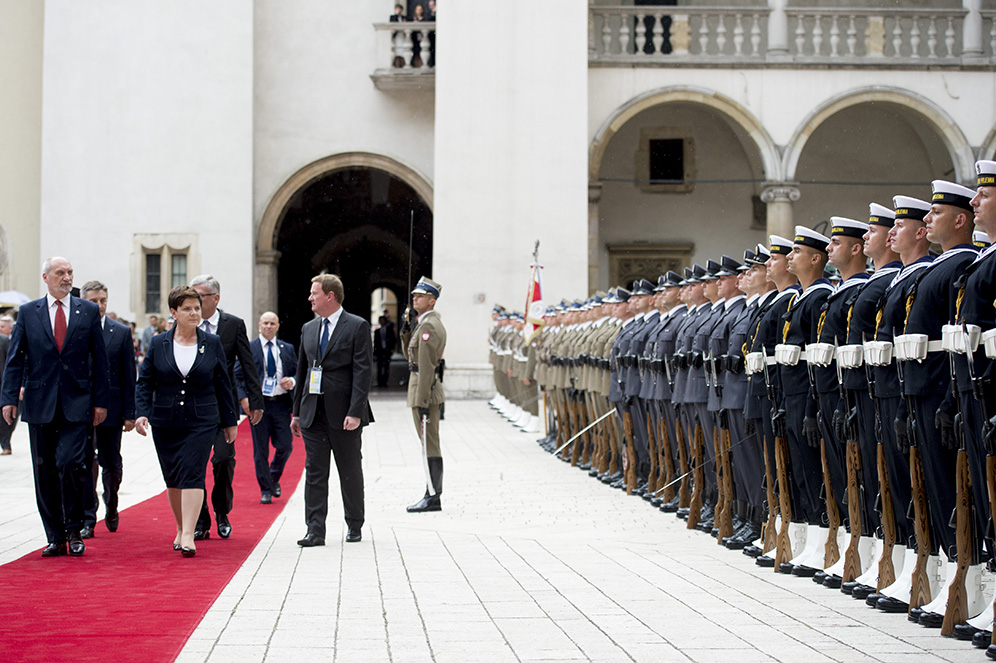
Macierewicz at World Youth Day 2016 in Kraków

Since 20 July 2010 Macierewicz is the Chairman of the Parliamentary Committee for the Investigation of the Causes of the 2010 Polish Air Force Tu-154 crash, commonly known as the Macierewicz Commission. The crash, which killed President of Poland Lech Kaczyński and his wife Maria, and 94 other dignitaries en route to the 70th anniversary commemorations of the Katyń massacre, has already been analyzed and documented by Committee for Investigation of National Aviation Accidents. Since the first days after the crash, Macierewicz claimed the crash was an assassination. Established on 8 July 2010, the goal of Macierewicz Commission was to disprove the official report. As the state investigation moved to exhumation of President Kaczyński's and others' bodies in late 2016, the New York Times summarized that "Macierewicz claimed over the years to have 'irrefutable evidence' of explosives [having caused the crash, but] his experts have yet to produce it."

=== Deputy Leader of Law and Justice ===
Since 23 November 2013 Macierewicz has been the Deputy Leader of Law and Justice, the largest party in the Parliament of Poland.

=== Minister of National Defence ===
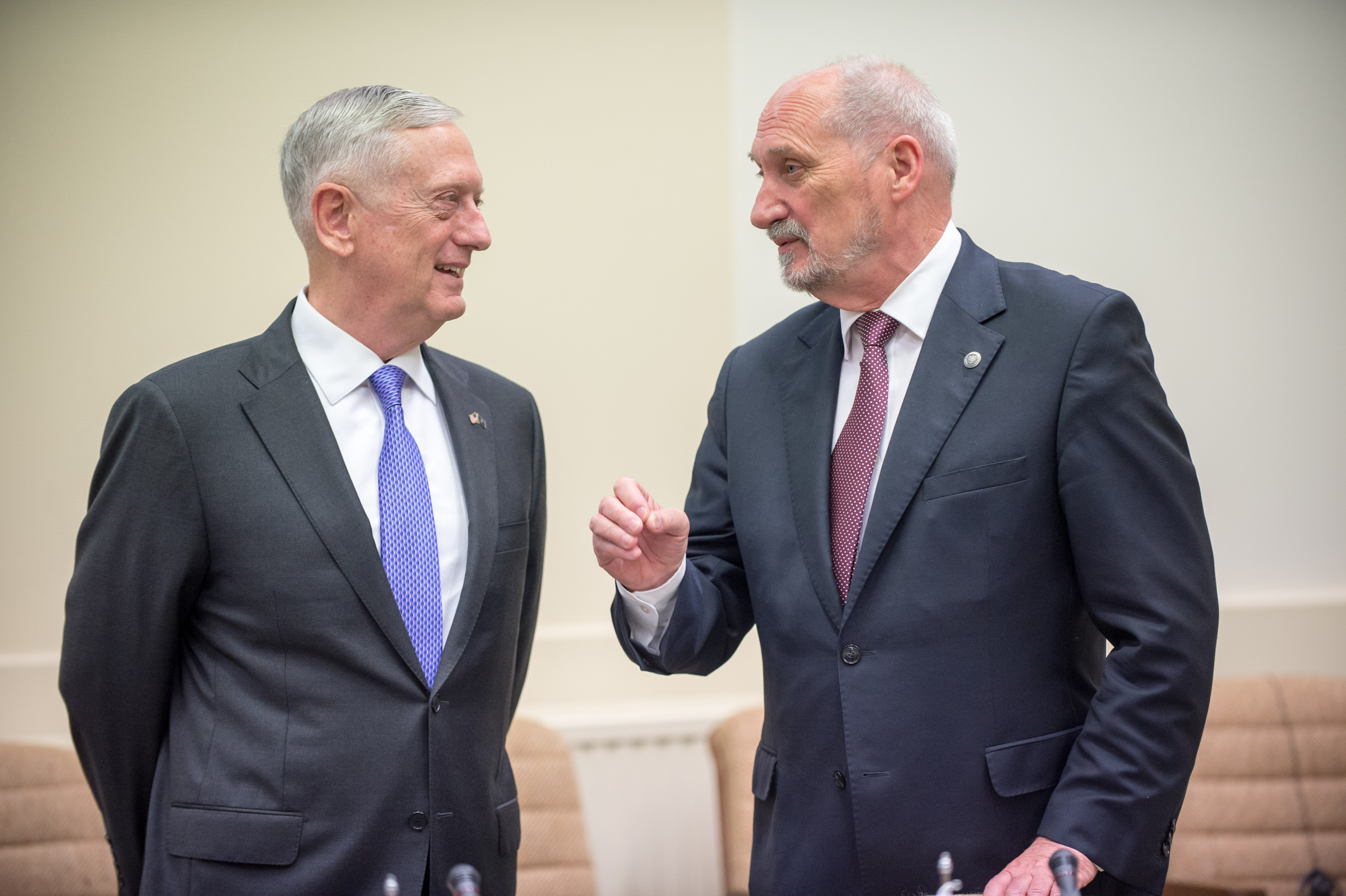
Secretary of Defense James Mattis talks with Antoni Macierewicz, Poland's defense minister, prior to a meeting at the NATO Headquarters in Brussels, Belgium, 29 June 2017

Macierewicz paid an official visit to Israel in April 2016. Macierewicz and Israeli Defense Minister Moshe Ya'alon pledged to strengthened military cooperation between Poland and Israel. Macierewicz was criticized in the Polish press during the 2016 Warsaw summit for his support of the defense industry of Israel. In October 2016 Macierewicz was condemned by Gazeta Wyborcza for his association with a leading champion of the fight to restore assets from Swiss banks to Holocaust survivors.

== Honors and awards ==
On 3 May 1990, Ryszard Kaczorowski, then President of Poland in exile, awarded Macierewicz the Order of Polonia Restituta, one of Poland's highest orders. News magazine Gazeta Polska named Macierewicz the 2010 Man of the Year.

On 23 September 2022 Macierewicz was awarded the Order of the White Eagle, the highest state decoration.

== Controversies ==
Following Macierewicz's designation as Minister of National Defence, he faced allegations of anti-Semitism and protests by the Anti Defamation League. In 1996, Macierewicz wrote that Poles did not murder Jews in the Kielce pogrom in 1946. In 2001, Macierewicz wrote: "Is the hubbub surrounding Jedwabne intended to eclipse the responsibility of Jews for Communism and the Soviet occupation?"

In a radio interview in 2002 Macierewicz said, in response to a caller's question, that he had read the Protocols of the Elders of Zion, and that while there are doubts on authenticity that "Experience shows that there are such groups in Jewish circles." The statement was condemned by the Jewish community in Poland. According to, Krzysztof Izdebski, the Chairman of the Council of The Union of Jewish Communities, Macierewicz apologized for the statement and "accepts with no doubts that the Protocols is false" which was accepted by the council. Justin Schulberg, a Jewish American former legislative assistant to Macierewicz and a student leader at Rutgers University, stated, “As a Jewish American, I am outraged by false and outlandish rumors and innuendos accusing Antoni Macierewicz, Poland’s Minister of National Defence-designate, of antisemitism… I hope that all factions in Poland will forcefully condemn the use of Judaism for political infighting.” Anna Chipczynska, the President of the Jewish Community of Warsaw, said, "the latest statement by Mr. Macierewicz denouncing all forms of anti-Semitism could be a positive signal that the new Polish government will stand strongly against manifestations of hatred toward Jews."

In July 2016, Macierewicz said that the "real enemy", Russia, shares responsibility for the massacres of Poles and Jews in German-occupied Volhynia and Eastern Galicia. Russian Foreign Ministry spokeswoman Maria Zakharova said that "the Polish government is moving from Russophobia to inciting national hatred," and asked Macierewicz if "there are any historical events and natural disasters for which Russia is not the one to blame." Macierewicz's claim was also criticized by the Federation of Jewish Communities of Russia.

In the comical webseries The Chairman's Ear (2017), implicit references are made to an alleged homosexual relationship between "Minister of War" Antoni and a younger man. This pun refers to Macierewicz's close ties with the much younger politician Bartłomiej Misiewicz (born in 1990).

In October 2024, a special commission investigating Russian and Belarusian influences in Poland accused Macierewicz of undertaking decisions as defence minister that weakened Poland's defence capability, including canceling plans to purchase tanker aircraft for the country's F-16 fighter jet fleet without analysis or consultation, which the commission attributed to Macierewicz's "personal aversion to partners in the EU". It also accused him of weakening Poland's intelligence capabilities by closing down 10 out of the Polish intelligence service's 15 regional bureaus in 2017. In response, Macierewicz called the charges "absurd".

== Footnotes ==
Political offices
Preceded by Henryk Majewski	Minister of Internal Affairs; 1991–1992	Succeeded by Andrzej Milczanowski
Preceded by Tomasz Siemoniak	Minister of National Defence; 2015–2018	Succeeded by Mariusz Błaszczak
Government offices
New office	Chairman of the Verification Commission; 2006–2007	Succeeded by Jan Olszewski
New office	Head of the Military Counterintelligence Service; 2006–2007	Succeeded by Janusz Nosek
Party political offices
Preceded by —	Deputy Leader of Law and Justice; 2013–present	Incumbent
Honorary titles
Preceded by Kornel Morawiecki	Senior Marshal of the Sejm; 2019–2023	Succeeded by Marek Sawicki
