= Głos (1991) =

- Owner: Dziedzictwo Polskie
- Editor: Antoni Macierewicz
- Founded: 1977
- ISSN: 0866-9325
- OCLC number: 183350452
- Website: www.glos.com.pl

Głos (Polish pronunciation: [ˈɡwɔs], lit. from Polish: Voice) is a Polish socio-political weekly magazine. Its editor in chief is Polish politician Antoni Macierewicz. It has a self-declared Catholic-nationalist bias (Głos: tygodnik katolicko-narodowy). It traces its tradition back to an underground opposition bibuła publication of anti-communist opposition from 1977 of that same name.
