= Lauder–Morasha School =

- Warsaw; Poland

Information
- School type: Jewish day school
- Established: 1994; 31 years ago
- Grades: Preschool - Grade 9
- Age: 3 to 16
- Enrollment: 240 (2007)

Lauder–Morasha School is a Jewish day school in Warsaw, Poland.

== History ==
The school was established by the Ronald S. Lauder foundation in 1994, following the success of the Lauder Kindergarten created in 1989. It is the first school under Jewish auspices in Warsaw since 1949. In 2007, its enrollment was 240 students, ranging in age from three to sixteen years old (pre-school to Grade 9).

The school's founding director was Helise E. Lieberman (1994–2006); the second director (2006–2017) was Polish-born Rabbi Maciej Pawlak. The current director of the pre-school is Anna Szyc; the grade school and upper division are under the directorship of Anna Grządkowska.

The school is not a religious academy; students are taught Hebrew and Jewish tradition and culture (in addition to the complete standard Polish curriculum), but there are no compulsory religious activities.

The school's historic building was designed by Henryk Stifelman and served as a facility for Jewish senior citizens prior to World War Two. Its ruins were restored for the school by the Ronald S. Lauder Foundation.

== Sister schools ==
The Lauder-Morasha School has a sister school, Lauder Etz Chaim, in the western Polish city of Wrocław, constituting another part of a larger Lauder school network of 36 schools and kindergartens in sixteen Central and Eastern European countries from Germany to Russia and from Estonia to Bulgaria.

Additionally, the Lauder Foundation operates the Lauder E-School in Poland. Headquartered in Łódź in central Poland, E-Szkoła (as it's known in Polish) provides supplemental distant learning courses to Polish-speaking children who cannot attend either of the full-time Jewish day schools.

== See also ==
- History of the Jews of Poland
- Israel–Poland relations
- Lauder Schools of Prague
