= Radosław Kujawa =

Polish intelligence officer

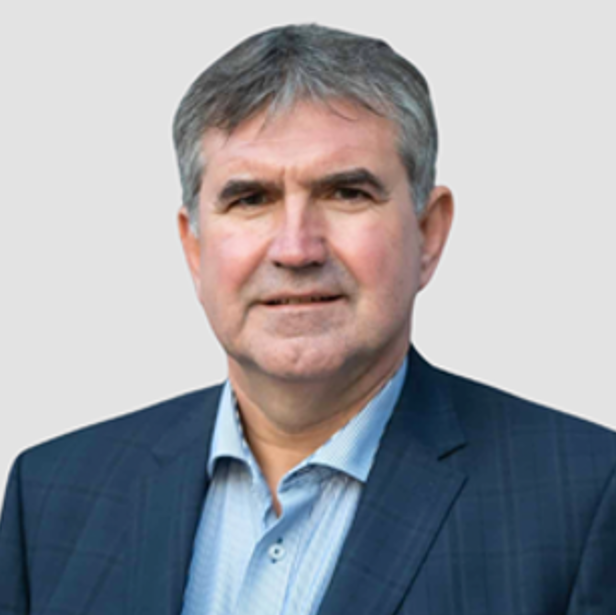

Head of the Military Intelligence Service
- In office 11 August 2008 – 19 November 2015
- Preceded by: Maciej Hunia

Personal details
- Born: Radosław Tomasz Kujawa; 1965 (age 60–61) Poland

Radosław Tomasz Kujawa (born in 1965), is a Polish intelligence officer, who served as head of the Military Intelligence Service from 2008 to 2015.

== Biography ==
Radosław Kujawa was born in 1965.

He was a graduate of history at the University of Wrocław. In the 1980s, he was an activist of the Independent Students' Association at the university. He worked in the Intelligence Board of the State Protection Office, after the reform of the secret services in 2002 he was transferred to the Foreign Intelligence Agency. He served, incl. in managerial positions (head of department and department director)

Since 11 August 2008, Kujawa has been the Head of the Military Intelligence Service. On 9 November 2010, Polish President Bronisław Komorowski, at the request of the Minister of National Defense, Bogdan Klich, appointed Kujawa as the Brigadier General of the SWW. In 19 November 2015, he was dismissed from office by the Prime Minister Beata Szydło.

Since 2018, he has been an associate of the Institute of the Middle and Far East of the Jagiellonian University.

Kujawa is on the list of personalities from European Union countries subject to Russian visa sanctions. This list was compiled in response to the EU sanctions list, and was shown to "apply to people who actively supported the state coup (in Kyiv), as a result of which Russians are persecuted and discriminated against in Ukraine," according to the Minister of Foreign Affairs, Sergey Lavrov.
