= Polish Action =

Christian-National Movement Polish Action Polish: Ruch Chrześcijańsko-Narodowy Akcja Polska
- Abbreviation: AP
- Chairman: Antoni Macierewicz
- Ideology: National conservatism
- Political position: Right-wing

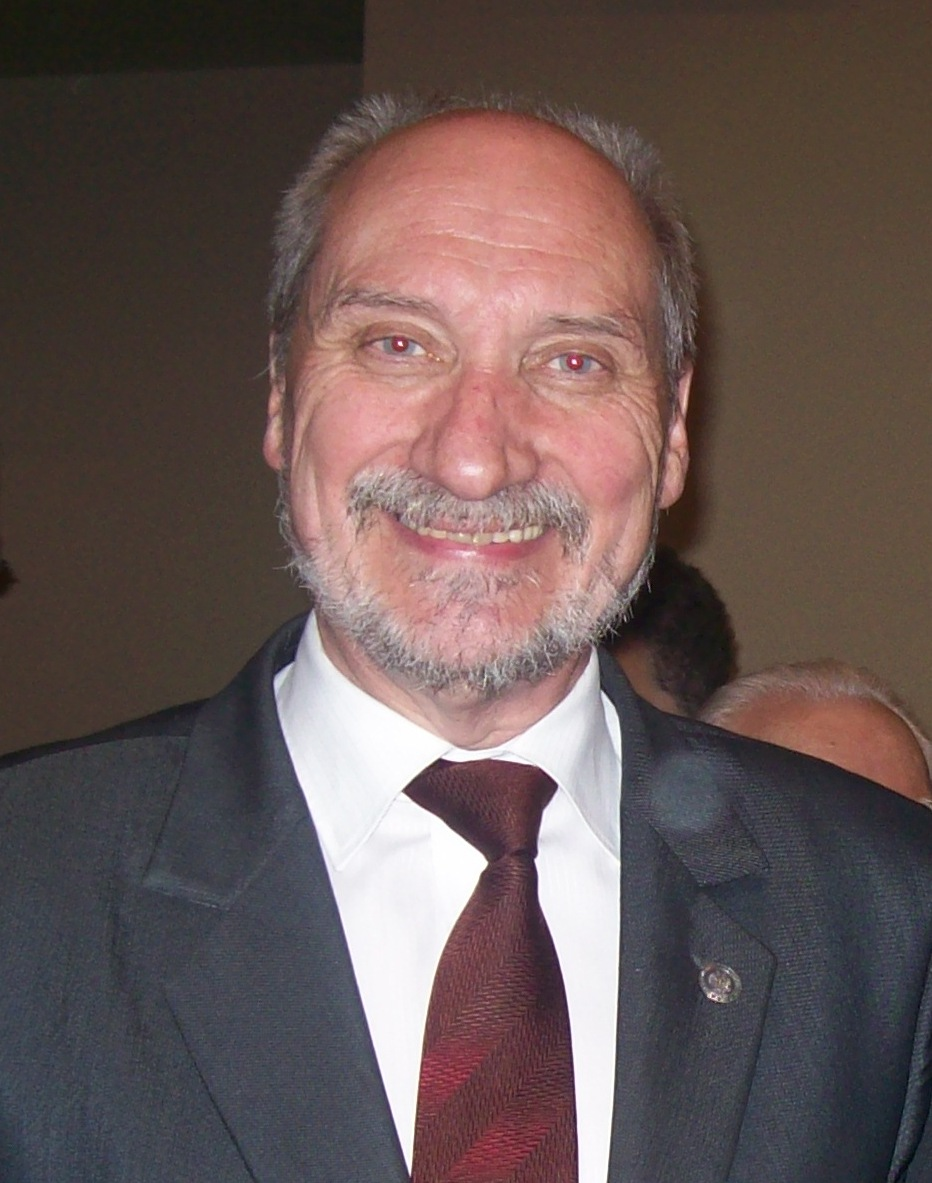
Leader of the Polish Action, Antoni Macierewicz

The Christian-National Movement Polish Action (Polish: Ruch Chrześcijańsko-Narodowy Akcja Polska, AP) was a national-conservative political party existing in the 90s.

== History ==
The party was created by the Polish Action parliamentary circle, a splinter of former Christian National Union activists, which left the Union after the fall of the Cabinet of Jan Olszewski. The circle was composed of Antoni Macierewicz (leader of the circle and party throughout its existence), Mariusz Marasek and Piotr Walerych. The first party convention occurred on 27 February 1993.

On 6 June 1993 the Polish Action joined the Movement for the Republic of Jan Olszewski and in the 1993 parliamentary election, AP activists ran from the Coalition for the Republic list, which failed to cross the 5% threshold.

In 1995 it supported the candidacy of Jan Olszewski in that year's presidential elections, and joined the Movement for the Reconstruction of Poland. Formally it existed until 1998.
