= Embassy of Poland, Tel Aviv =

Ambasada Rzeczypospolitej Polskiej w Izraelu Embassy of the Republic of Poland in Israel

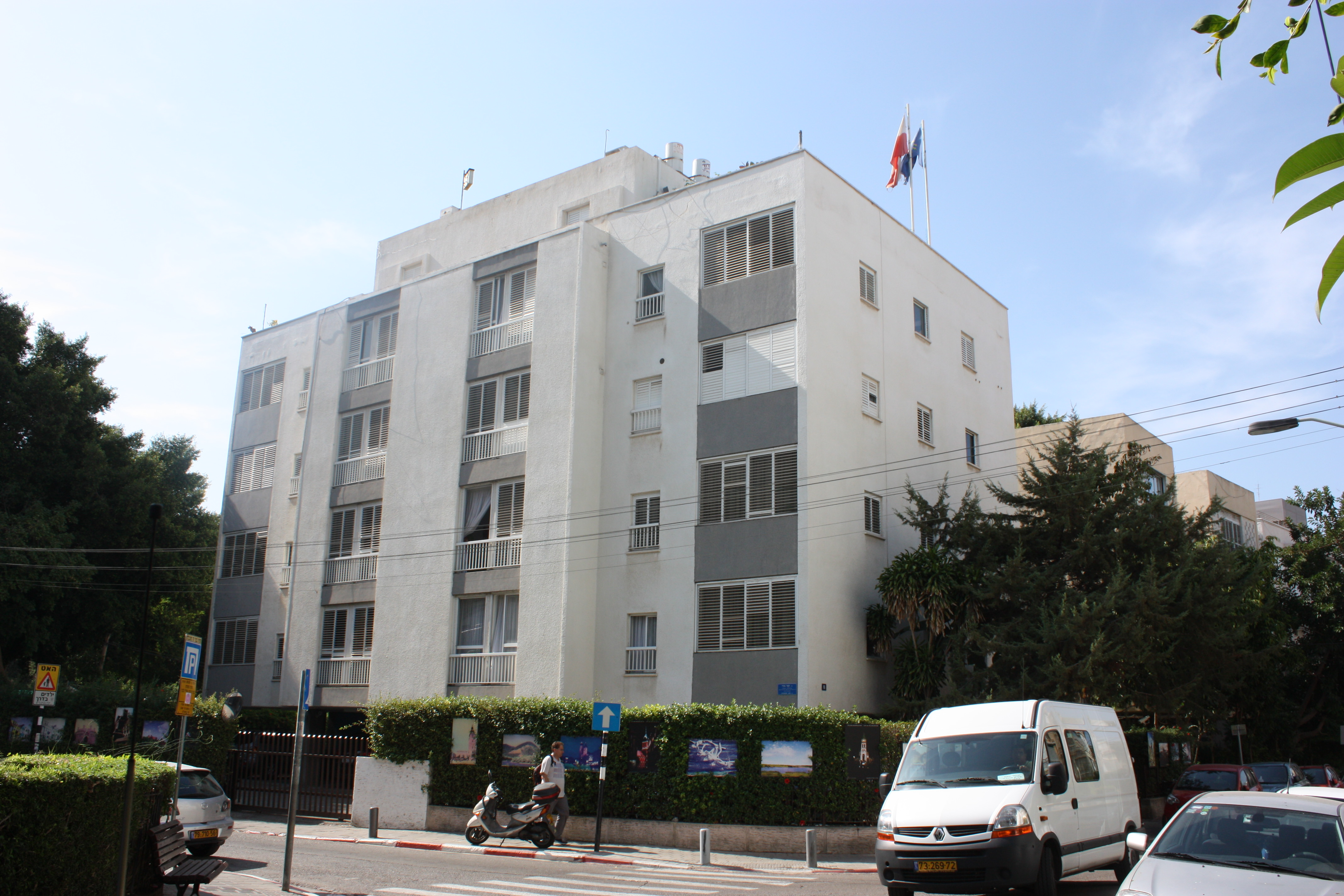
- Address: Soutine St 16, Tel Aviv-Yafo, 64684, Israel
- Coordinates: 32°04′55″N 34°47′06″E
- Ambassador: Maciej Hunia
- Website: gov.pl/israel

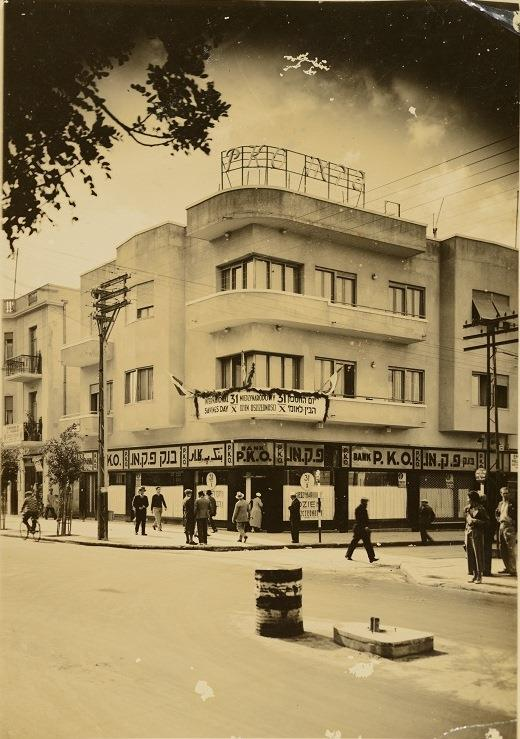
The Consulate, and later Embassy of Poland, in Tel Aviv was originally based in the Bank Pekao building in 88 Albany Street

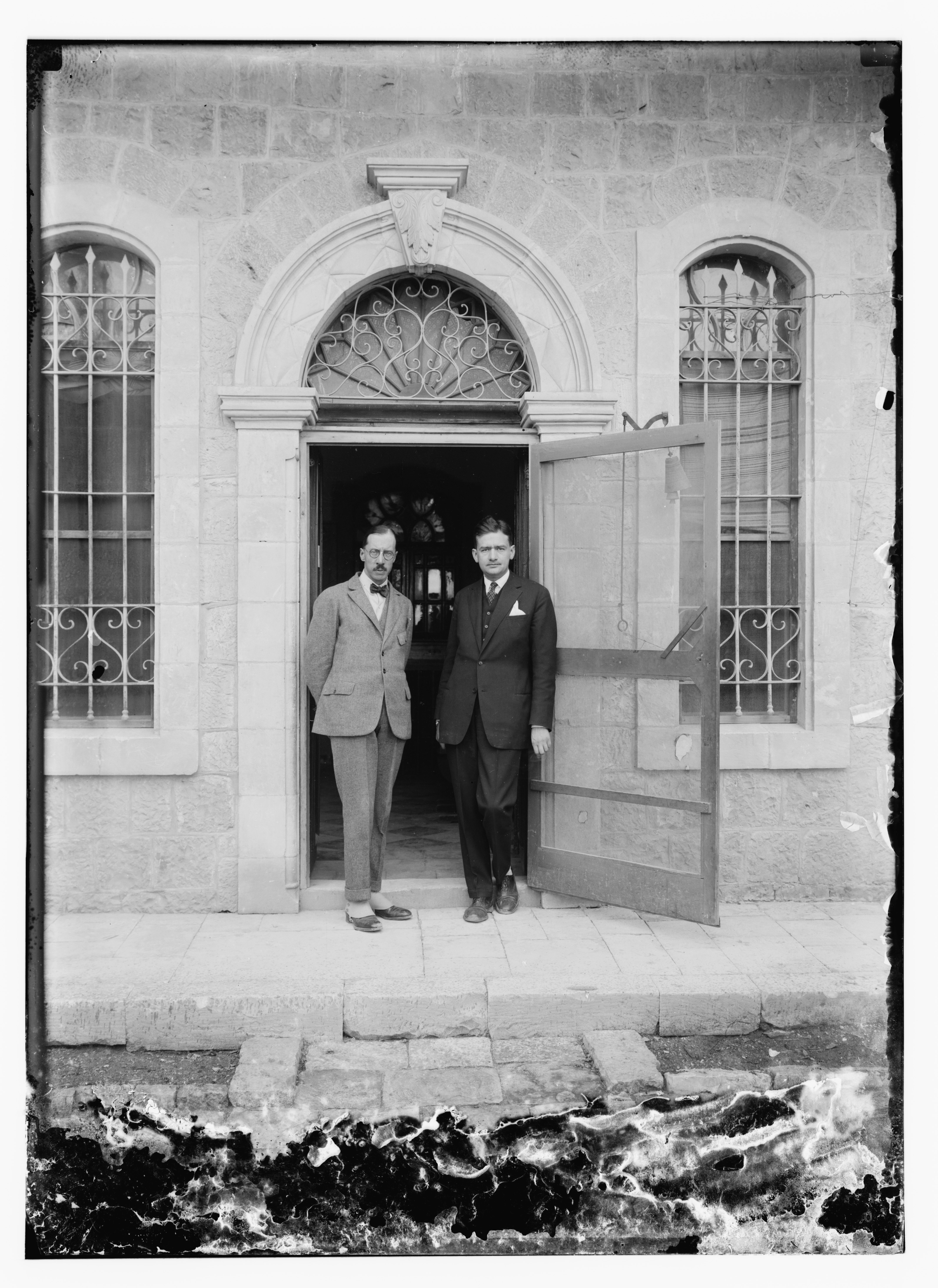
Polish consulate in Jerusalem, during the British Mandate for Palestine

The Embassy of Poland in Tel Aviv (Hebrew: השגרירות של הרפובליקה של פולין בתל-אביב) is the diplomatic mission of Poland to Israel.

== History ==
Before the establishment of the state of Israel, under the British Mandate for Palestine, Poland already had a consulate in both Tel Aviv and Jerusalem.

When diplomatic ties between the two countries were officially established in May 1949, the Tel Aviv consulate was upgraded to a legation (the Jerusalem consulate was closed as Poland did not recognize Israel's sovereignty over the city). The legation was upgraded to an embassy in 1962, but together with several other Warsaw Pact countries closed it in 1967. The embassy was reopened in 1990.

On 18 February 2018, after the Polish prime minister compared "Jewish perpetrators" with Polish, Ukrainian, Russian and German perpetrators of the Holocaust, swastikas were drawn on the embassy's gate.

== See also ==
- Israel–Poland relations
