= Lauder Schools of Prague =

Coordinates: 50°4′26.26″N 14°26′7.76″E

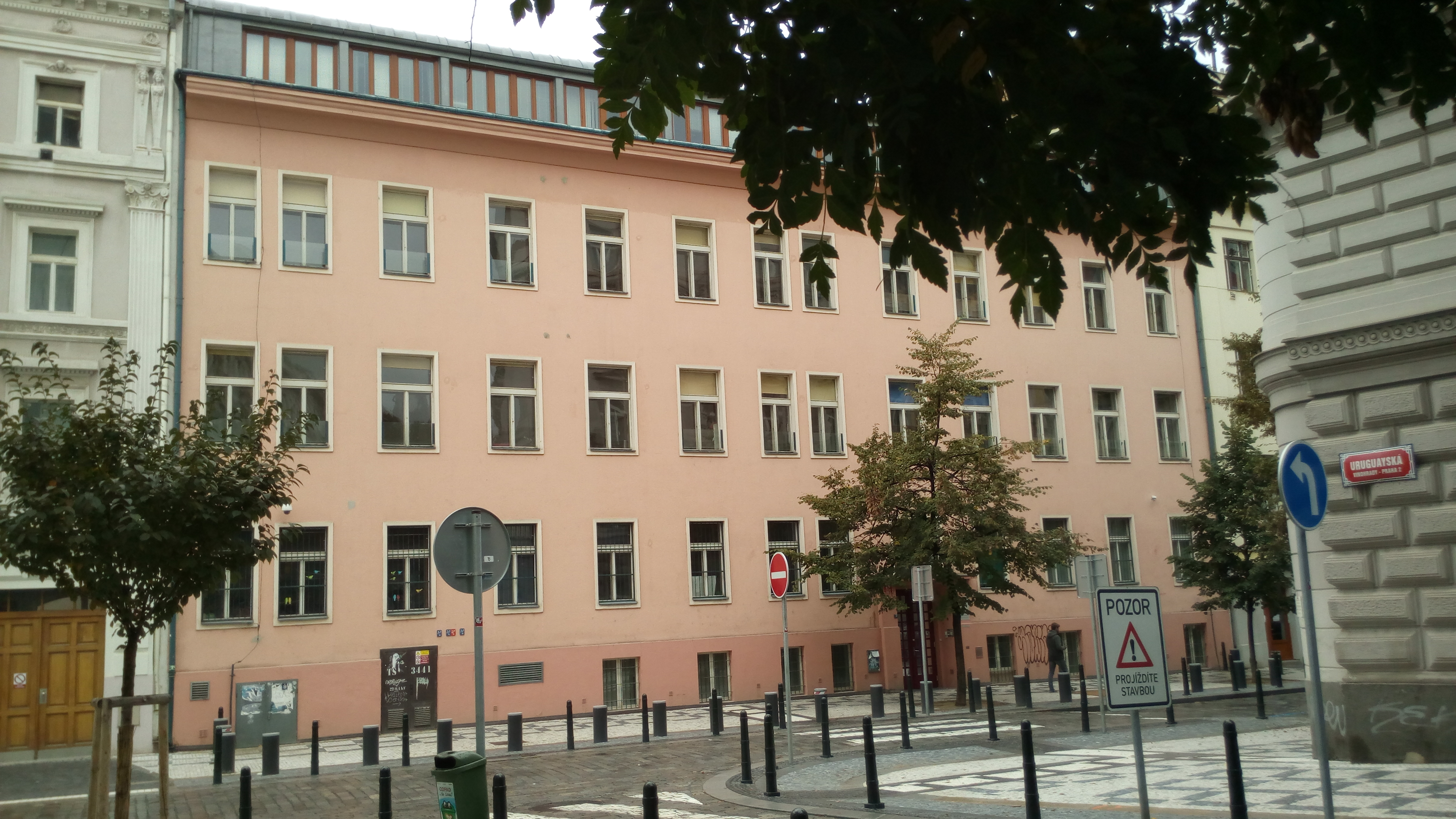
Lauder Schools building in Prague 2-Vinohrady

The Lauder Schools of Prague (Czech: Lauderovy školy v Praze) are the only Jewish schools in Prague and in the entire Czech Republic. The schools consists of an elementary school called The Lauder Gur Arje Jewish Day School and a secondary school called The Lauder Or Chadaš Jewish Community High School. The names of the schools refer to an important figure of the Jewish Ghetto in Prague, Rabbi Judah Loew ben Bezalel, who was also known as the Maharal of Prague and Rabbi Loew.

The schools were founded in 1997 by the Prague Jewish Community together with the R. S. Lauder Foundation and the Czech Ministry of Education, they operate on the site of a former orphanage for Jewish children who had lost their families in the Holocaust and man of whom have perished themselves.

More than 450 students attend the Lauder Schools of Prague as of 2024.

All subjects are taught in Czech, except for foreign languages (Hebrew, English, German and French). Three hours a week of Judaism is also taught. The school operates a kosher kitchen and runs according to the Jewish calendar.

Even though there is a kindergarten, an elementary school and a secondary school in the Lauder School of Prague, it only has one principal: Mr. Petr Karas.

There are similar schools in other countries. Poland has the Lauder - Morasza School, Hungary the Lauder Javne Jewish Community School, etc.
