= Marek Magierowski =

Polish politician (born 1971)

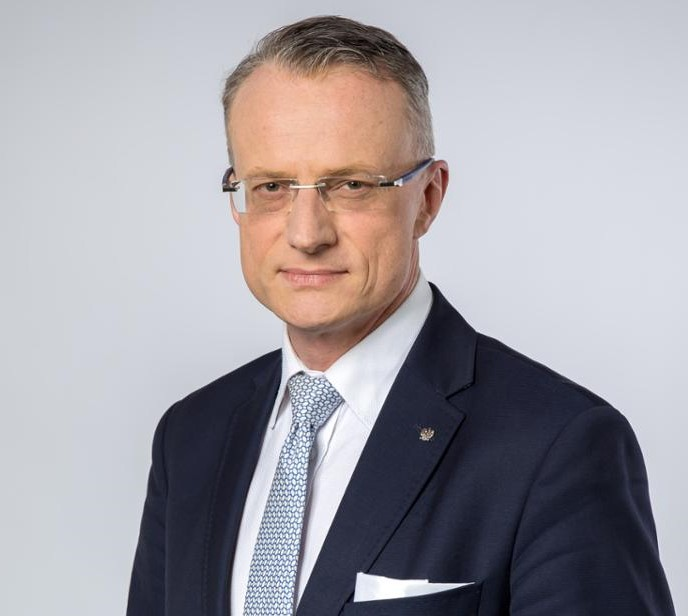

Poland Ambassador to Israel
- In office 25 June 2018 – 7 November 2021
- Preceded by: Jacek Chodorowicz
- Succeeded by: Maciej Hunia

Poland Ambassador to the United States
- In office 23 November 2021 – July 2024
- Preceded by: Piotr Wilczek
- Succeeded by: Bogdan Klich (Chargé d’Affaires a.i.)

Personal details
- Born: 12 February 1971 (age 55) Bystrzyca Kłodzka, Poland
- Spouse: Anna Ornatowska-Magierowska
- Children: 2
- Education: Adam Mickiewicz University in Poznań
- Profession: Diplomat, journalist, editor

Marek Grzegorz Magierowski (born 12 February 1971) is a Polish journalist, columnist, politician and diplomat; from 2021 to 2024 ambassador to the United States and from 2018 to 2021 ambassador to Israel.

== Life ==
Magierowski was born in the Lower Silesian town of Bystrzyca Kłodzka and graduated from Hispanic Studies at the Adam Mickiewicz University in Poznań (1994). He wrote his thesis on Camilo José Cela.

For over 20 years he worked as a reporter, editor and columnist, covering mostly international relations. He was deputy head of the economic desk in Gazeta Wyborcza, head of the foreign affairs desk and the business section of the weekly Newsweek Polska, deputy editor-in-chief of Rzeczpospolita (2006–2011). He was also affiliated with Do Rzeczy.

In October 2015 he started working for the Chancellery of the President of the Republic of Poland as an expert on public diplomacy and, in December 2018, he was appointed as a press officer. From June 2017 to May 2018 he served as Undersecretary of State at the Ministry of Foreign Affairs. In June 2018 he became Ambassador Extraordinary and Plenipotentiary of the Republic of Poland to the State of Israel. He ended his term in 2021. From November 2021 to July 2024 he served as ambassador to the United States.

In July 2024, Magierowski was recalled from his post, but requested almost 1 million Polish złoty ($250000) compensation in order to resign.

He is married to Anna Ornatowska-Magierowska, has two children. Apart from Polish, he is fluent in English, French, German, Spanish, Italian, Portuguese, Catalan, and Hebrew.

== Works ==
Books

- Magierowski, Marek (2013). Zmęczona. Rzecz o kryzysie Europy Zachodniej. Kraków: Ośrodek Myśli Politycznej. ISBN 978-83-62628-67-4.
