= Maciej Hunia =

Polish diplomat and intelligence officer

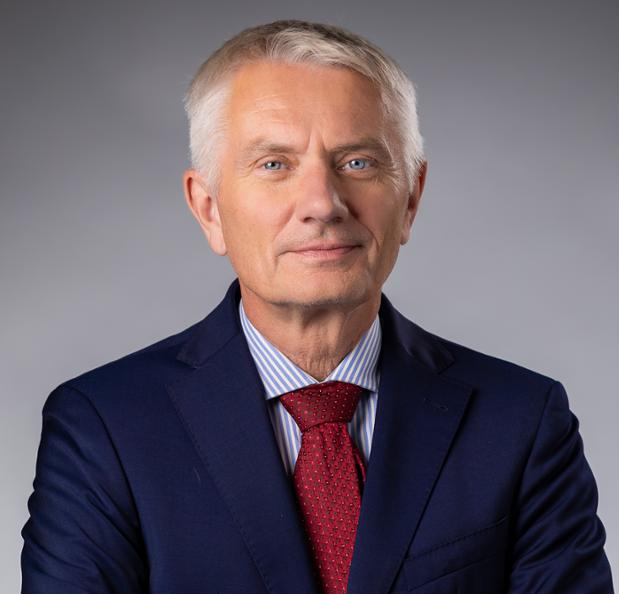
- Hunia in 2024

Poland Ambassador to Israel
- Incumbent
- Assumed office 21 July 2025
- Chargé d'affaires a.i.
- In office October 2024 – 21 July 2025
- President: Andrzej Duda
- Prime Minister: Donald Tusk

Personal details
- Born: Maciej Marek Hunia; 25 February 1961 (age 65) Kraków, Poland
- Education: Jagiellonian University
- Espionage activity
- Allegiance: Poland
- Agency: Foreign Intelligence Agency; Military Intelligence Service; Internal Security Agency; Office of State Protection
- Service years: 1990–2015
- Rank: Brigadier general

Maciej Marek Hunia (born 25 February 1961) is a Polish diplomat and former intelligence officer. He has been Poland Ambassador to Israel since 21 July 2025, having led the embassy in the rank of chargé d'affaires ad interim from October 2024. He briefly headed the Military Intelligence Service in 2008 and was head of the Foreign Intelligence Agency from 2008 to 2015.

Hunia began his service in 1990 in the Office of State Protection, becoming head of its counterintelligence directorate in 1997. He moved to the Internal Security Agency in 2002, where he headed the counterintelligence department until 2006. He retired from the intelligence services after his dismissal in 2015.

== Early life and education ==
Maciej Marek Hunia was born on 25 February 1961 in Kraków, Poland. In the 1980s, he studied at the Jagiellonian University, graduating with a master's degree in history.

During his university years, he was active in the Independent Students' Association and was engaged with a youth dissident movement associated with Jan Rokita. He also practised mountaineering, through which he became personally acquainted with Konstanty Miodowicz, head of the Counterintelligence Directorate of the Office of State Protection from 1990 to 1995 and a later member of the Sejm.

== Intelligence service ==
Hunia began his service in the newly established Office of State Protection (UOP) in 1990 at its branch office in Kraków, where he served until 1997.

On 12 November 1997, Hunia became head of the Counterintelligence Directorate at the UOP's headquarters. During his tenure, a residency of the Russian Foreign Intelligence Service operating under diplomatic cover from the Russian Embassy in Warsaw was uncovered, and twelve spies were expelled from Poland in January 2000.

Following the reform of the Office of State Protection by Leszek Miller's government and its division into the Foreign Intelligence Agency (AW) and the Internal Security Agency (ABW) in June 2002, Hunia continued his service in the latter agency as the head of the ABW's Counterintelligence Department until October 2006.

On 5 April 2004, Hunia was promoted to the rank of brigadier general by President Aleksander Kwaśniewski on the recommendation of Prime Minister Leszek Miller.

In 2007, Hunia was posted to the Polish Embassy in Prague, Czech Republic, in the rank of counsellor and served there as the ABW's liaison officer.

Following the October 2007 parliamentary election and the subsequent change of government in Poland, Hunia was recalled to the country. In early December 2007, he joined the Military Intelligence Service (SWW) and acted as its deputy head, later that month becoming acting head and succeeding Witold Marczuk. On 16 January 2008, Hunia was permanently appointed to the post by Prime Minister Donald Tusk.

On 7 June 2008, Hunia was appointed acting head of the Foreign Intelligence Agency (AW) succeeding Andrzej Ananicz, who had held the position in an acting capacity for a maximum period of three months since March 2008. On 11 August, Hunia was formally dismissed as head of the SWW and permanently appointed head of the AW by Prime Minister Donald Tusk.

Hunia was dismissed as head of the AW on 19 November 2015, three days after the formation of Beata Szydło's cabinet formation following the 2015 parliamentary election, and subsequently retired from the service.

== Diplomatic career ==
From 2019 to 2023, Hunia served as an adviser to the Senate Foreign and European Union Affairs Committee.

On 25 July 2024, Hunia's candidacy for the post of Poland Ambassador to Israel was presented to and considered by the Sejm Foreign Affairs Committee, which issued a positive opinion on his candidacy. (Note: The Foreign Affairs Committee voted 15 to 12 in favour of a positive opinion on his candidacy, with one abstention.) In mid-October 2024, Hunia assumed charge of the Polish Embassy in Tel Aviv as chargé d'affaires ad interim, after President Andrzej Duda refused to appoint him ambassador upon nomination by Minister of Foreign Affairs Radosław Sikorski. The political dispute between Duda and Donald Tusk's cabinet over ambassadorial nominations continued until April 2025, when the president signed the appointments of Hunia and nineteen other government nominees. Hunia presented his credentials to Israeli President Isaac Herzog on 21 July 2025, becoming the first Polish ambassador to Israel since Marek Magierowski's recall in August 2021 amid a deterioration in relations.

On 5 August 2025, the Israeli Ministry of Foreign Affairs summoned Hunia and delivered a formal démarche over remarks by Prime Minister Donald Tusk, who had suggested that some Israeli politicians had contributed to the humanitarian crisis in Gaza.

== Views ==
During Hunia's parliamentary hearing before the Sejm Foreign Affairs Committee in July 2024, he declined to describe the civilian deaths in the Israeli invasion of the Gaza Strip as genocide. In an interview with The Times of Israel that he gave after taking office as chargé d'affaires a.i. in October 2024, he maintained this position, describing the civilian deaths as "collateral damage" occurring during any armed struggle.

== Awards and decorations ==
- (Poland) Cross of Merit, Gold (1998)
- (Poland) Order of Polonia Restituta, Knight's Cross (2002)
- (Poland) Bene Merito Honorary Distinction (2009)
- (Estonia) Order of the Cross of the Eagle, 2nd Class (2014)
