= Israel–Poland relations =

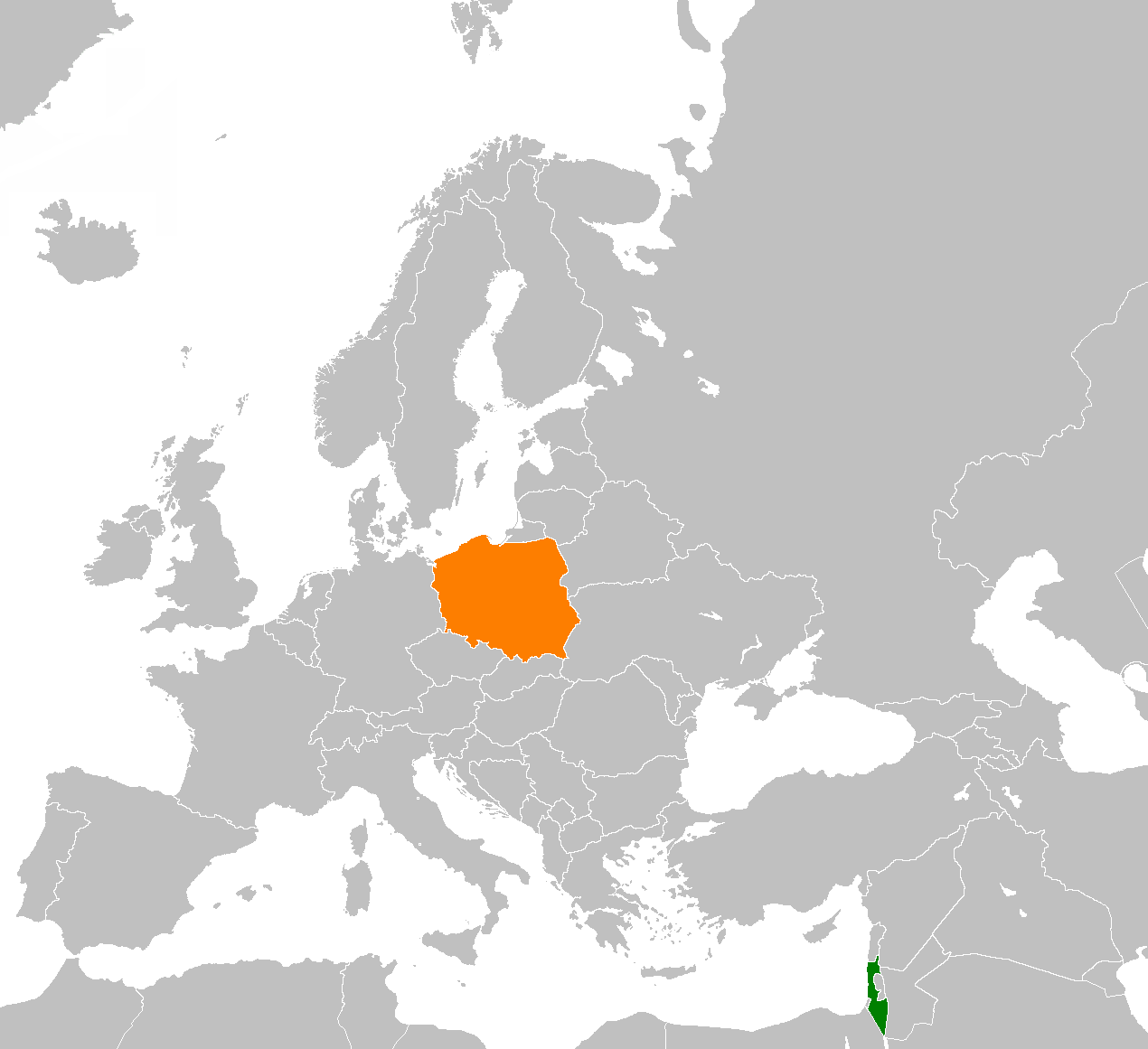
- Israel: Poland

Israel–Poland relations comprise diplomatic relations between Israel and Poland. Israel has an embassy in Warsaw, while Poland has an embassy in Tel Aviv. The Polish ambassador to Israel is Marek Magierowski, while the newly appointed Israeli ambassador to Poland is Yacov Livne, and the charge d'affaires is Tal Ben-Ari Yaalon. Both countries are members of the Organisation for Economic Co-operation and Development, the Union for the Mediterranean and United Nations.

In 2007, approximately 1,200,000 Israeli citizens were eligible for Polish citizenship, (Note: this number essentially entails the amount of Israelis with least one Polish great-grandparent, as of 2007.) including about 202,300 people who were born in Poland or had a Polish-born father. David Ben-Gurion, Shimon Peres and other important figures in Israeli history were born in Poland.

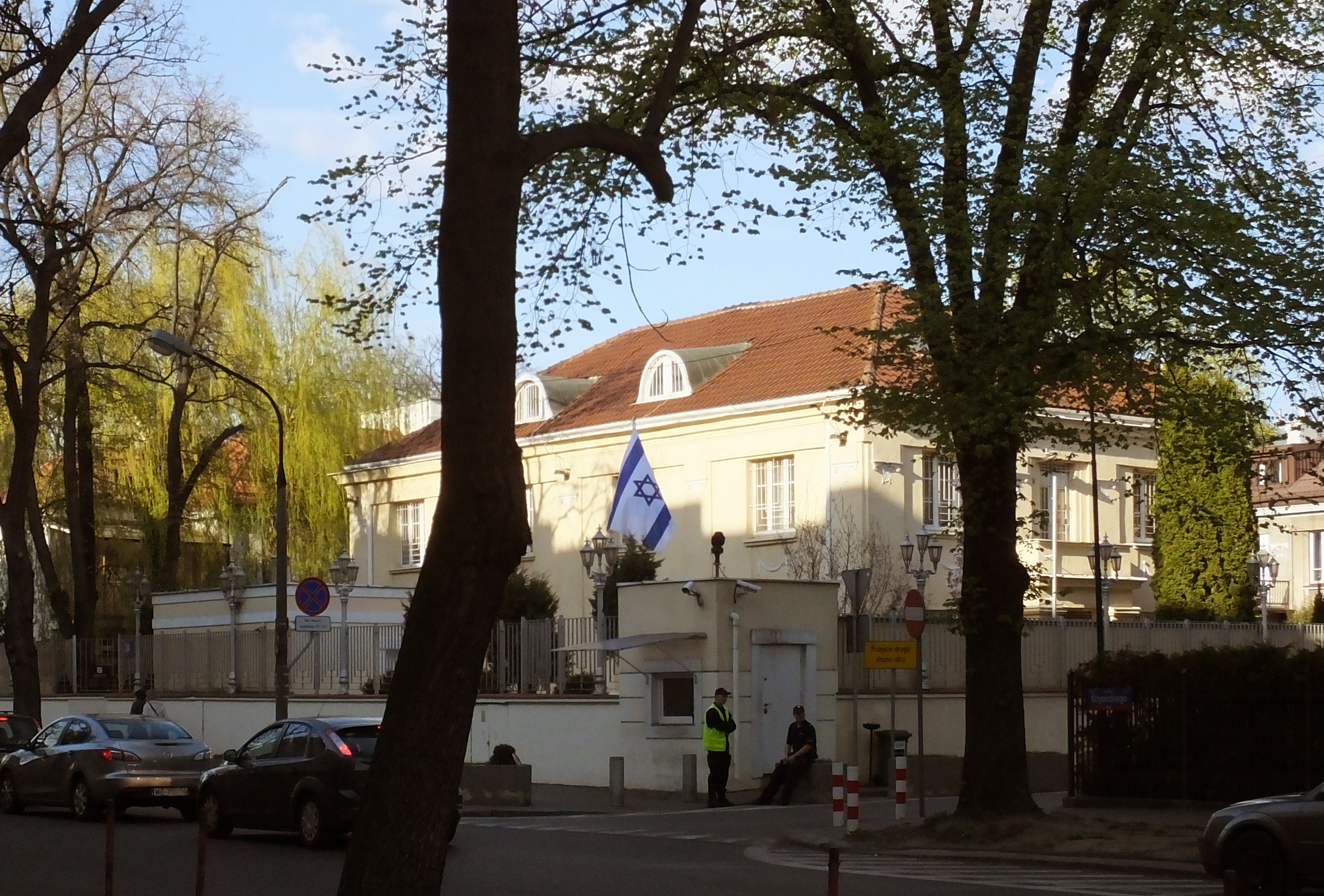
Embassy of Israel in Warsaw

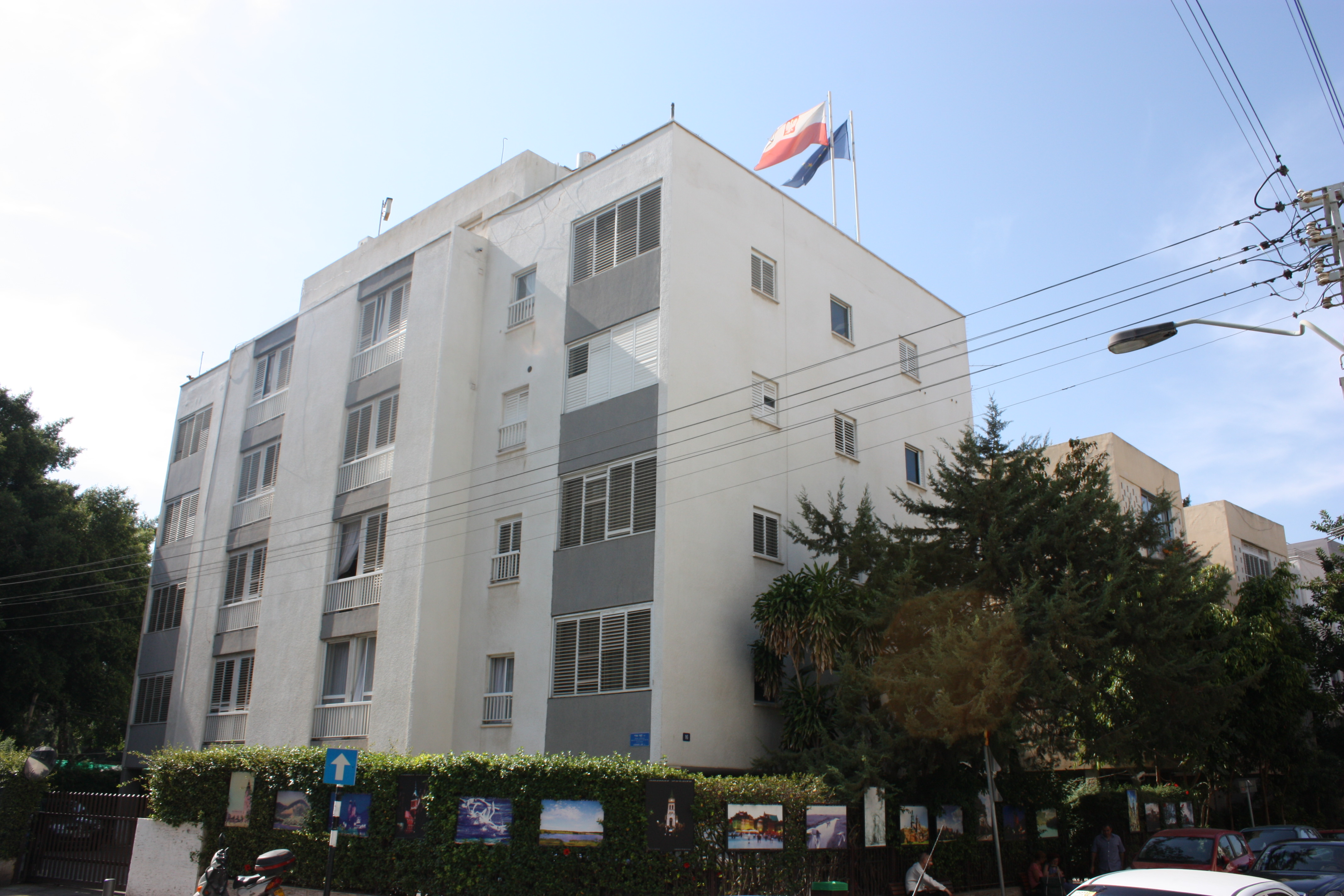
Embassy of Poland in Tel Aviv

== History ==
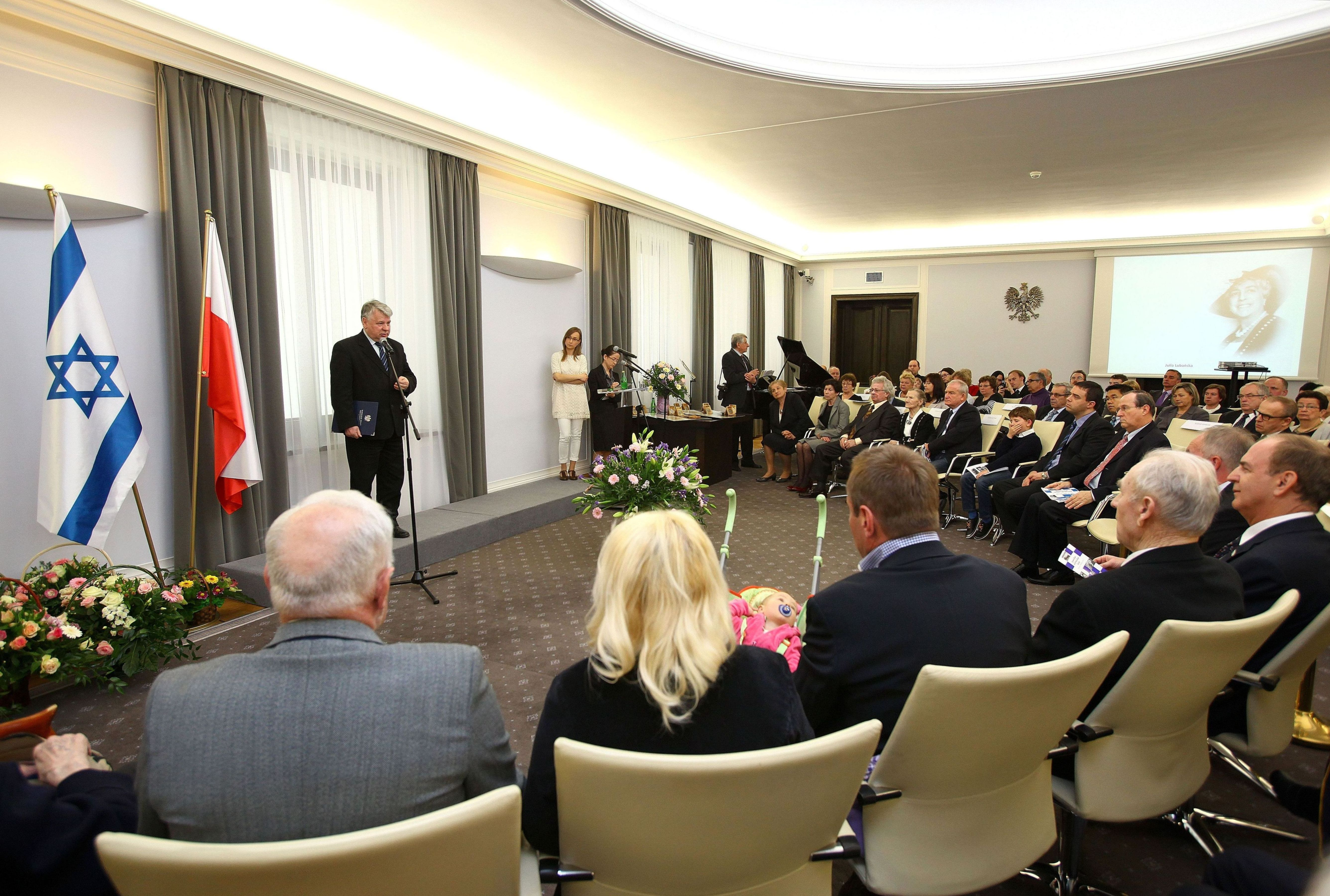
A Righteous Among the Nations award ceremony in the Polish Senate, 2012

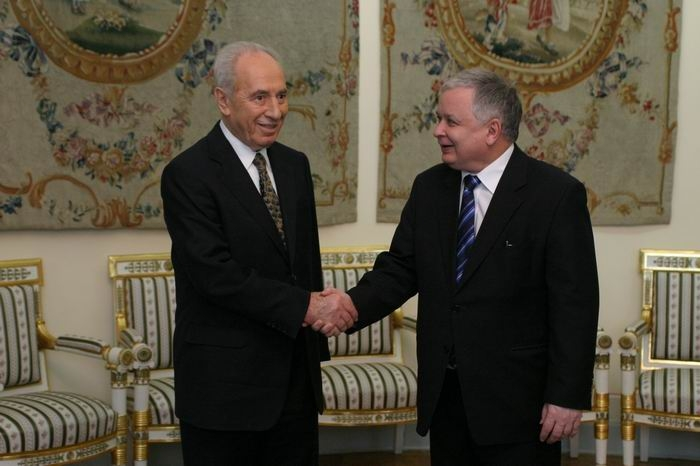
Shimon Peres and Lech Kaczyński in Poland, 2006

Starting in the late 10th century, Poland was home to a Jewish community, which by the Late Middle Ages grew to become one of the largest in Europe, as Jews fled persecution and expulsions from Western Europe, while Poland issued the Statute of Kalisz in 1264, which granted them special protection.

=== Holocaust ===
In World War II and the Jewish genocide perpetrated by Germany, much of Poland's Jewish community was wiped out and many of those who survived were subjected to anti-Jewish violence and other hostility in Poland. Most of the survivors emigrated to other countries, with about 70,000 emigrating to Israel.

During German occupation, the country lost 20% of its population, or six million people. Over three million Polish Jews were murdered (90% of the country's Jewish population), primarily at the Chełmno, Belzec, Sobibor, Treblinka and Auschwitz extermination camps, who made up half of the Jewish Holocaust victims.

The citizens of Poland have the highest count of individuals who have been recognized by Israel's Yad Vashem as the Righteous Among the Nations, for saving Jews from extermination during the Holocaust. There are 7,232 (as of 1 January 2022) Polish men and women conferred with the honor. The list of Righteous Among the Nations is not comprehensive and it is estimated that hundreds of thousands of Poles concealed and aided tens of thousands of their Polish-Jewish neighbors. Many of these initiatives were carried out by individuals, but there also existed organized networks of Polish resistance which were dedicated to aiding Jews – most notably, the Żegota organization.

=== Communist era ===
From 1947 until the fall of its Soviet-installed Communist regime in 1989, Poland was a part of the Soviet Bloc and followed Soviet policy towards Israel. As part of the Bloc, on 29 November 1947 Poland voted in favor of the United Nations Partition Plan for Palestine, which led to the establishment of the state of Israel. On 19 May 1948, Poland also recognized Israel and established diplomatic relations. In September 1948, Israel opened a diplomatic mission in Warsaw. After 1951, relations with Israel deteriorated as the Soviet Union significantly increased its involvement in the Arab world. In June 1967, after the Six-Day War, Poland joined the Soviet Bloc in severing diplomatic relations with Israel.

In May 1948, Polish-born David Ben-Gurion became Israel's first prime minister.

In 1986, Poland initiated contacts with Israel, and both countries soon opened interest offices in the other country, and in 1988 an Israel-Poland Chamber of Commerce was formed.

=== Post Communist era ===
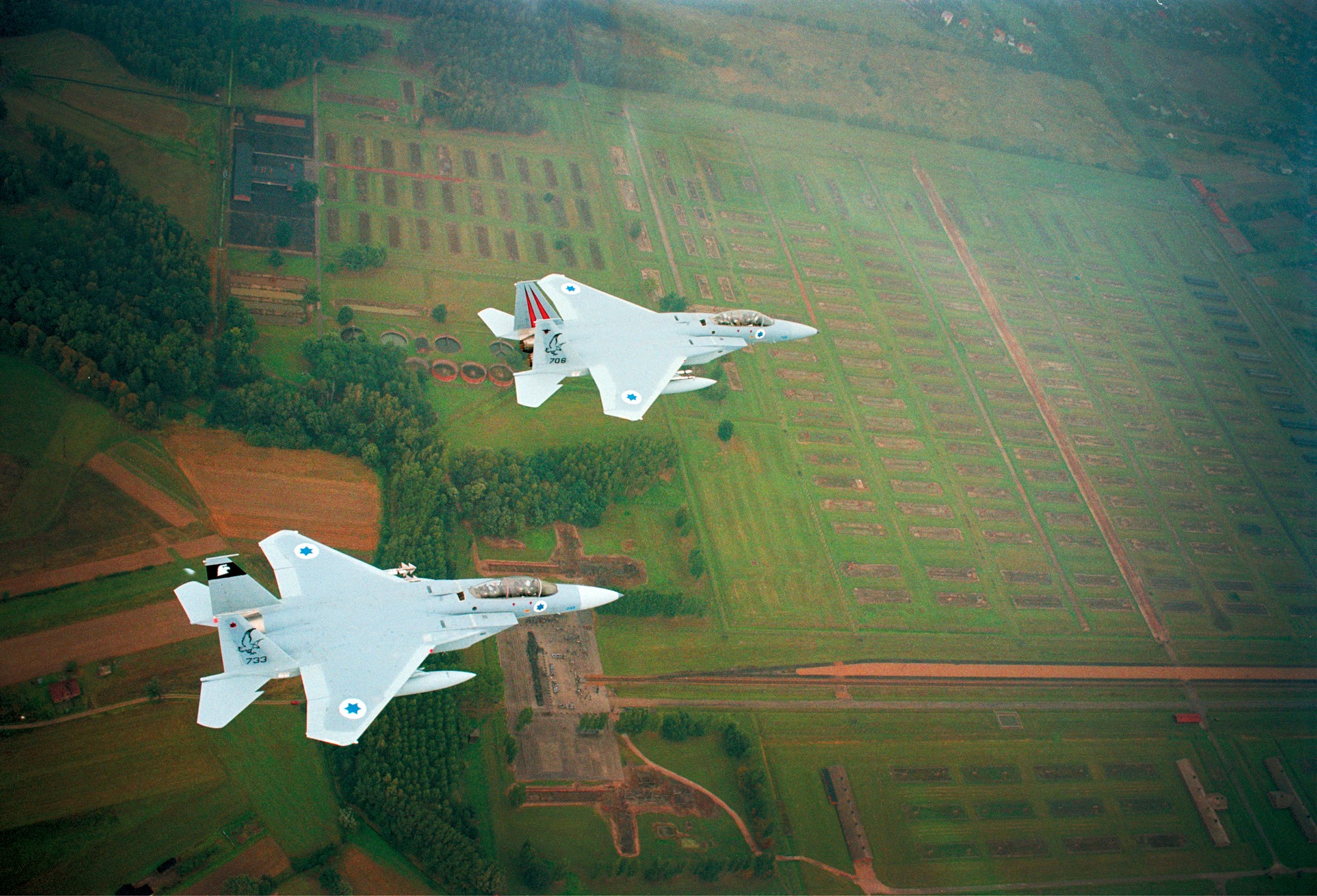
Israeli Air Force flight over Auschwitz in 2003.

In 1989, Poland's communist government fell, and in November 1989 Polish-born Israeli Deputy Prime Minister Shimon Peres visited Poland, paving the way for the resumption of diplomatic relations. During his visit, Peres met with Polish President Wojciech Jaruzelski and Prime Minister Tadeusz Mazowiecki. Full diplomatic relations were restored on 27 February 1990, leading to expanded political, military, economic, and cultural cooperation between the two countries. In May 1991, Polish President Lech Wałęsa visited Israel.

At the start of the Gaza war, the Polish Air Force evacuated Polish citizens from Israel to Crete, Greece, from where they were then transported by civilian aircraft to Poland, whereas Israeli citizens were transported by the Polish Air Force from Poland to Israel, so they could either join the defense of Israel or reunite with their mourning families. Israel's Ambassador to Poland Yacov Livne thanked Poland for help in the matter.

Polish Prime Minister Donald Tusk condemned Israel's conduct during the Gaza war. In August 2025, Polish Foreign Minister Radosław Sikorski accused Israel of using "excessive force" in the Gaza Strip. He urged Israel to "respect international humanitarian law" in the Gaza Strip and the occupied West Bank, saying that "no one has the right to cause children to starve". Sikorski also said that Poland recognized the Palestinian state many years ago and has always condemned illegal Israeli settlements in the West Bank.

== Trade and transportation agreements ==
In 1995, Israel signed an Association Agreement with the European Union (EU) which includes free trade and came into effect in 2000. In 2004, on Poland joining the EU, the free trade provisions of the EU Agreement applied to trade between Israel and Poland. In 2016, trade between Israel and the EU totaled €34.3 billion, while trade between Israel and Poland was US$682 million. Israel's main exports to Poland include: gas turbines, packaged medicaments, calcium phosphate, fruits and vegetables and medical instruments. Poland's main exports to Israel include food-based products, textiles processing machines, vehicle chassis, cars, buses, dairy and wheat.

There are regular flights between Israel and Poland by the following airlines: Arkia, El Al, Enter Air, LOT Polish Airlines, Ryanair, Travel Service and Wizz Air.

== State visits ==
Presidential and Prime Ministerial visits
from Israel to Poland

- President Chaim Herzog (1992)
- Prime Minister Yitzhak Rabin (1993)
- Prime Minister Ariel Sharon (2005)
- President Moshe Katsav (2005)
- President Shimon Peres (2008)
- Prime Minister Benjamin Netanyahu (2013)
- President Reuven Rivlin (2014, 2018)

Presidential and Prime Ministerial visits
from Poland to Israel

- President Lech Wałęsa (1991)
- Prime Minister Włodzimierz Cimoszewicz (1997)
- President Aleksander Kwaśniewski (1999, 2000, 2005)
- President Lech Kaczyński (2006)
- Prime Minister Jarosław Kaczyński (2006)
- Prime Minister Donald Tusk (2008, 2011)
- President Bronisław Komorowski (2013)
- Prime Minister Beata Szydło (2016)
- President Andrzej Duda (2016, 2017)

== Bilateral relations ==
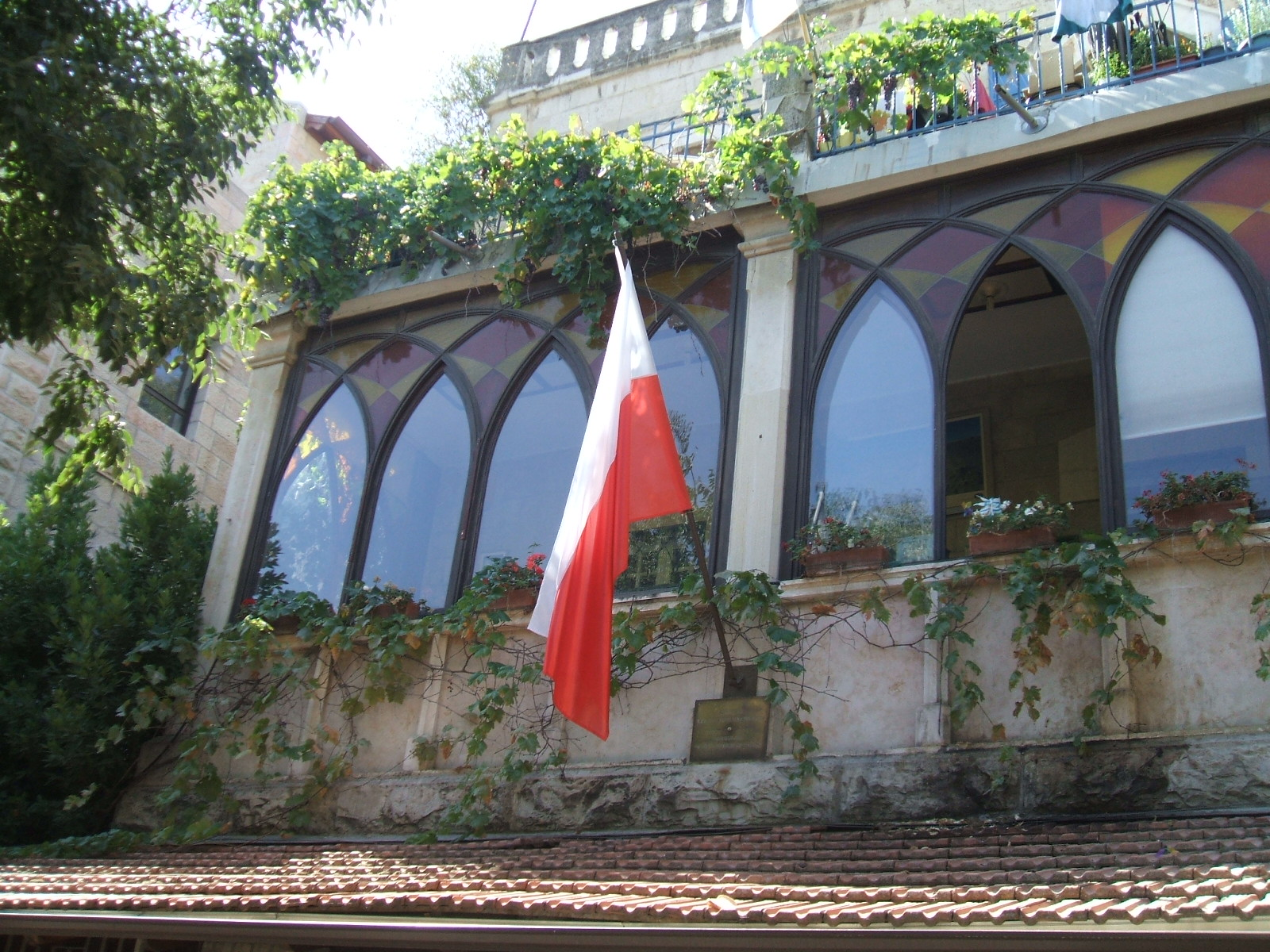
Polish consulate, Jerusalem

Over the years, both Israel and Poland have signed numerous bilateral agreements including an Agreement on Cooperation in Culture, Science and Education (1991); Agreement for the Avoidance of Double Taxation and the Prevention of Fiscal Evasion with Respect to Taxes on Income (1991); Agreement on Cooperation in Culture, Science and Education (1991); Air Transport Agreement (1991); Agreement for the Promotion and Reciprocal Protection of Investments (1992); Agreement in the field of Economy, Science and Technology regarding Cooperation Applied to Agriculture and Food Industry (1993); Agreement on Technical Cooperation in Dairy Development (1997); Agreement on Cooperation in Tourism (1999); Agreement on the Abolition of Visa Requirement for holders of Ordinary and National Passports (2000); and an Agreement on Cooperation and Mutual Assistance in Customs Matters (2001).

== Diplomatic incidents ==
In early 2018, both chambers of the Polish parliament (the Sejm and Senate) adopted an Amendment to the Act on the Institute of National Remembrance, criminalizing the ascription to Poles collectively of complicity in World War II Jewish-Holocaust-related or other war crimes committed by the Axis powers, and condemning use of the expression, "Polish death camp". The law sparked a crisis in Polish-Israeli relations. At the Munich Security Conference on 17 February that year, Polish Prime Minister Mateusz Morawiecki said "it is not going to be seen as criminal to say that there were Polish perpetrators, as there were Jewish perpetrators, as there were Russian perpetrators, as there were Ukrainian perpetrators, not only German perpetrators." His remark prompted a controversy, and condemnation by prominent Israeli politicians, including Prime Minister Benjamin Netanyahu. The crisis was resolved in late June that year when the Polish and Israeli prime ministers issued a joint communiqué endorsing research into the Jewish Holocaust and condemning the expression, "Polish concentration camps".

Relations again deteriorated in February 2019 when during a visit to Poland, Netanyahu said, "Poles collaborated with the Nazis". Misquotes of this in the media as "the Poles collaborated with the Nazis" led Morawiecki to consider cancelling his planned visit to Israel the following month for a Visegrád Group summit. Netanyahu's office clarified that this was a misquote by the Jerusalem Post, and he did not say "The Poles" but "a not insignificant number of Poles", an explanation accepted by the Polish government. However, the dispute reignited 3 days later, when Israeli foreign minister Israel Katz claimed that "the Poles imbibe antisemitism from their mothers’ milk" and subsequently refused to apologise, resulting in Poland pulling out of the Visegrad Group summit altogether, leading to its cancellation. U.S. Ambassador to Poland Georgette Mosbacher remarked that there was no room for offensive comments, and asked Israel to apologize. New Right leader and cabinet minister Naftali Bennett noted that his wife's family lived four years in a forest in Poland and were finally murdered by Poles.

In February 2019, Poland cancelled an Israeli official delegation trip to Poland. In May 2019, a man was arrested for spitting at Polish ambassador Marek Magierowski while he was sitting in his car near the embassy. The man apologized and explained that he had been upset by an antisemitic slur by an embassy guard. Following comments by the Polish Prime Minister calling the incident "xenophobic", 29 former Polish ambassadors signed a letter criticizing the Polish government's response.

=== Property restitution controversy ===
In June 2021, Poland proposed a law to put a 10-to-30 year statute of limitation on restitution claims, which would therefore nullify cases regarding property seized during World War II, which Israel's Foreign Minister Yair Lapid described as “immoral and a disgrace.” Polish Prime Minister Mateusz Morawiecki said “I can only say that as long as I am the prime minister, Poland will not pay for German crimes: Neither zloty, nor euro, nor dollar.” Lapid also said, “We are fighting for the memory of the Holocaust victims, for the pride of our people, and we won’t allow any parliament to pass laws whose goal is to deny the Holocaust.” The proposed law would nevertheless also prevent people whose property was confiscated by the Polish communist government (1944–1989) from getting their lost property restituted/compensated.

Poland’s President Andrzej Duda finally signed the law on 14 August. In response, Israel recalled its envoy from Poland and told the Polish ambassador not to return. Nevertheless, Poland returned its envoy to Israel in July 2022 as a sign of rapprochement in bilateral relations.

== Public opinion ==
According to a 2025 Pew Research Center survey, 16% of people in Poland had a favorable view of Israel, while 62% had an unfavorable view; 11% had confidence in Israeli Prime Minister Benjamin Netanyahu, while 70% did not.

== See also ==
- History of the Jews in Poland
- Jewish Roots in Poland
- Lauder – Morasha School
- List of Polish Jews
- "Polish death camp" controversy
- Israel–EU relations
