= Janusz Bojarski =

Polish general

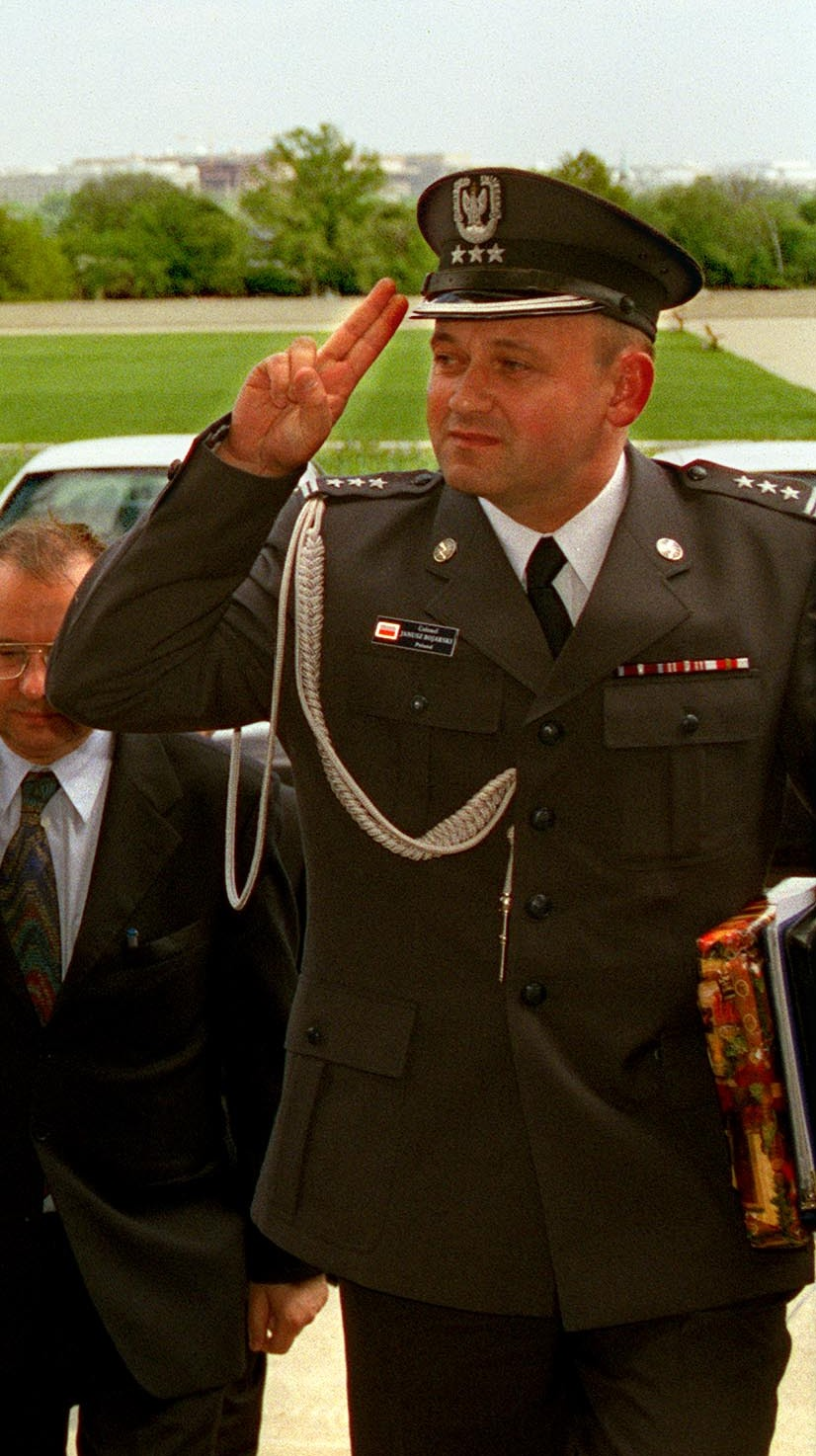
Janusz Bojarski in 2002

Major General Janusz Bojarski (born 24 June 1956, Krasnosielc, Poland) General Officer of Polish Armed Forces.

He joined the Polish Armed Forces in 1975. After graduating from the Signal Officers’ College in 1979, he served in a variety of posts in the Polish Air Force.

In 1991 he was appointed as the senior officer in the Defence Attachés’ Bureau of the Polish MoD and in 1993 he began his diplomatic career as the Assistant Defence, Military, Naval and Air Attaché to the Polish Embassy in Paris. After his tour of duty in France, in 1998 he became Chief of the Foreign Relations Office in the Military Intelligence Service. Promoted to Colonel in 1999, he was appointed as Director of the Defence Attachés’ Bureau.

From 2000 to 2004, Major General Bojarski held the position of Defence and Air Attaché to the Polish Embassy in Washington D.C. During his mission he was instrumental in managing the F-16 programme between the Polish Ministry of National Defence and the US Government. In 2004 he was promoted to the rank of Brigadier General and he served as the deputy director of the Military Intelligence Service for intelligence production. In December 2007 he took office as Director of the Personnel Department in the Polish MoD. From September 2010 to May 2014 he served as the Military Representative of Poland to NATO and the European Union (POL MilRep). On 25 July 2014 he became Commandant of the NATO Defense College in Rome, Italy.

Major General Bojarski holds a Master of Science degree in National Resource Strategy from the National Defense University in Washington D.C. (2007). He also holds a degree in pedagogy from Warsaw Military Academy (1984). He has completed Journalism and National Security postgraduate studies at the University of Warsaw. His education also includes the NATO International Intelligence Directors Course at the Defence Intelligence and Security Centre in the UK, the Generals, Flag Officers and Ambassadors’ Course at the NDC and the Security Assistance Management Foreign Purchasers Course at the Defence Institute of Security Assistance Management in Ohio, USA. He also received the French Business Language Certificate of the Chambre de Commerce et d’Industrie de Paris.

He is the recipient of numerous awards for his professional work: International Award for Security Cooperation and Understanding from the National Defense University Foundation, Legion of Merit from the United States Secretary of Defense and l’Ordre National du Mérite from the President of France.

== Bibliography ==
- CV on the NATO Defense College site
