= Military Counterintelligence Service (Poland) =

Military intelligence agency in Poland

- Służba Kontrwywiadu Wojskowego
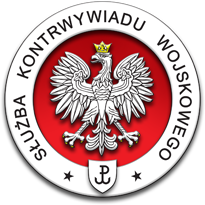

Agency overview
- Formed: 1 October 2006
- Preceding agency: Military Information Services
- Headquarters: ul. Oczki 1, Warsaw, Poland
- Agency executive: Jarosław Stróżyk, Head
- Parent agency: Ministry of National Defence
- Website: skw.gov.pl

The Military Counterintelligence Service (Polish: Służba Kontrwywiadu Wojskowego; SKW) is the counterintelligence agency responsible for protecting Poland's national defence, the security and combat capability of the Polish Armed Forces, and other organisations subordinate to or supervised by the Minister of National Defence from internal threats. The head of the SKW is a central government administration authority subordinate to the Minister of National Defence, subject to statutory powers of the prime minister and, when appointed, the Minister Coordinator of Special Services. The head's activities are subject to oversight by the Sejm.

== History ==
The SKW was established on 1 October 2006 under the Act of 9 June 2006 on the Military Counterintelligence Service and Military Intelligence Service. The accompanying legislation ended the legal basis of the Military Information Services on 30 September 2006, while the new framework created the SKW and the Military Intelligence Service as separate agencies responsible for internal and external military-security threats, respectively.

Antoni Macierewicz became the first head of the SKW. On 22 June 2012, the service received its standard.

== Responsibilities ==
Under its governing legislation, the SKW identifies, prevents and detects a defined range of offences committed by active-duty soldiers, SKW and SWW officers, and employees of the armed forces or Ministry of National Defence organisations. These include offences against the state, breaches of information security, certain corruption offences, illegal trade in strategic goods, and other acts threatening Poland's defence potential or the armed forces. The service cooperates with the Military Gendarmerie and other authorised law-enforcement bodies in investigating such offences.

Its other statutory responsibilities include identifying terrorist threats to Poland's defence potential and armed forces; protecting classified information; collecting, analysing and passing relevant security information to the competent authorities; conducting electronic counterintelligence, cryptographic protection and cryptanalysis; participating in verification of international arms control agreements; and protecting military units and personnel serving abroad. Its remit also covers the security of military research, development, production and procurement.

SKW officers undertake operational and reconnaissance activities, analytical and information work, and duties under legislation governing classified information. Operations outside Poland may be conducted only when connected with the service's domestic activities and within its statutory remit.

== Heads ==
- Antoni Macierewicz (4 October 2006 – 5 November 2007)
- Andrzej Kowalski (acting, 5–20 November 2007)
- Grzegorz Reszka (acting, 20 November 2007 – 20 February 2008)
- Janusz Nosek (acting, 20 February – 20 May 2008; head, 20 May 2008 – 8 October 2013)
- Piotr Pytel (acting, 9 October 2013 – 10 January 2014; head, 10 January 2014 – 18 November 2015)
- Piotr Bączek (acting, 19 November 2015 – 19 February 2016; head, 19 February 2016 – 15 January 2018)
- Maciej Materka (17 January 2018 – November 2022)
- Maciej Szpanowski (November 2022 – 19 December 2023)
- Jarosław Stróżyk (acting, 19 December 2023 – 5 March 2024; head since 5 March 2024)
