= List of illegal arms dealers =

The following is a list of illegal arms dealers – individuals involved in the illicit sale and transfer of firearms.

Name	Nationality	Born	Died
Abdelkader Belliraj	Morocco	1957	
Adnan Khashoggi	Saudi Arabia	1935	2017
Albert Hakim	Iran	1936	2003
Ali Fayad	Lebanon		
Arcadi Gaydamak	USSR	1952	
Basil Zaharoff	Ottoman Empire	1849	1936
Carlos Cardoen	Chile	1942	
Dale Stoffel	United States	1961	2004
Dino Bouterse	Netherlands	1972	
Edwin P. Wilson	United States	1928	2012
Efraim Diveroli	United States	1985	
Frank Terpil	United States	1939	2016
George Harrison	Ireland	1915	2004
Gerhard Mertins	Weimar Republic	1919	1993
Hank Greenspun	United States	1909	1989
Henry Fok	Hong Kong	1923	2006
Jacques Monsieur	Belgium	1952/1953	
James Gowda	United States	1942	
Leonid Minin	Ukrainian Soviet Socialist Republic	1947	
Manucher Ghorbanifar	Iran	1945	
Marat Balagula	Soviet Union	1943	2019
Monzer al-Kassar	Syria	1945	
Nahum Manbar	Israel	1946	
Patrick Nee	Ireland	1944	
Paul Ferris	United Kingdom	1963	2026
Paul Le Roux	Rhodesia	1972	
Pierre Beaumarchais	France	1732	1799
Pierre Dadak	France	1976	
Pierre Laureys	France	1919	2004
Samuel Cummings	United States	1927	1998
Sarkis Soghanalian	State of Syria	1929	2011
Tomislav Damnjanović	Serbia		
Uwe Behrendt	Germany	1952	1981
John Nardi	United States	1916	1977
Viktor Bout	USSR	1967	
Whitey Bulger	United States	1929	2018
Raymond “Shrimp Boy” Chow	United States	1959	
Ethan Erhardt	United States	1983	
