= Internal Security Agency =

Poland's domestic counterintelligence and security agency

- Agencja Bezpieczeństwa Wewnętrznego
- Logo of the Agencja Bezpieczeństwa Wewnętrznego (ABW)

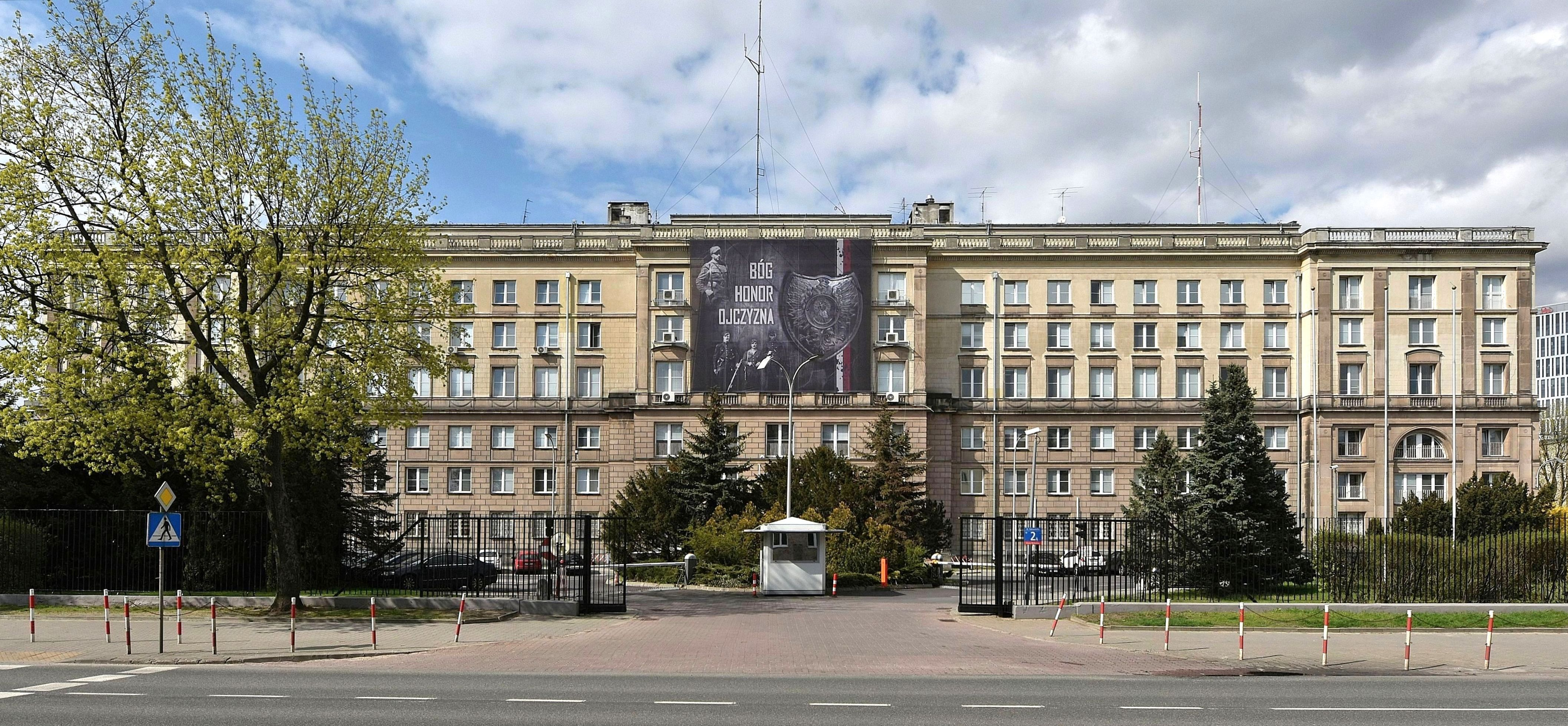
- ABW headquarters at 2a Rakowiecka Street in Warsaw

Agency overview
- Formed: 29 June 2002
- Preceding agency: Office of State Protection
- Jurisdiction: Government of Poland
- Headquarters: Warsaw, Poland
- Annual budget: 710,356,000 zł (2023)
- Ministers responsible: Donald Tusk, Prime Minister; Tomasz Siemoniak, Minister - Coordinator of Special services
- Agency executives: Colonel Rafał Syrysko, Acting Head; Colonel Bernard Bogusławski, Deputy Head; Colonel Krzysztof Zieliński, Deputy Head; Colonel Michał Roguski, Deputy Head
- Website: www.abw.gov.pl/en

The Internal Security Agency (ABW; Polish: Agencja Bezpieczeństwa Wewnętrznego; Polish pronunciation: [aˈɡɛnt͡sja bɛspʲɛˈt͡ʂɛɲstfa vɛvnɛ̃tʂˈnɛɡɔ]) is Poland's principal civilian intelligence and counterintelligence service responsible for internal security.

The Agency is tasked with identifying, preventing, and combating threats to the constitutional order and internal security of the Republic of Poland, including terrorism, espionage, and activities that may undermine state security. In carrying out its statutory duties, the ABW conducts intelligence, counterintelligence, and operational-investigative activities as provided by law, including counter-terrorism operations.

The ABW operates under the Act of 24 May 2002 on the Internal Security Agency and the Foreign Intelligence Agency, which defines its mandate, tasks, powers, and organizational structure. The Agency functions as a civilian special service subordinate to the Prime Minister of Poland, who exercises executive control over its activities. Parliamentary oversight of the ABW is exercised by the Sejm, in particular through the Sejm Committee for Special Services.

The ABW is headquartered on Rakowiecka Street in the Mokotów district of Warsaw.

== History ==
The Internal Security Agency was established pursuant to the Act of 24 May 2002 on the Internal Security Agency and the Foreign Intelligence Agency, which entered into force on 29 June 2002. The legislation reorganized Poland’s civilian intelligence system by dissolving the Office for State Protection (UOP), which had operated since 1990, and dividing its competences between two separate agencies. As a result of this reform, the Internal Security Agency (ABW) assumed responsibility for internal security as well as intelligence and counterintelligence tasks within the territory of Poland, while the Foreign Intelligence Agency (AW) became responsible for foreign intelligence activities conducted outside the territory of Poland.

== Mission and operations ==
In accordance with Article 5 of the 2002 Internal Security Agency and Foreign Intelligence Agency Law, the ABW is tasked to protect Polish citizens, property and the state in a number of fields. These operations include domestic counter-intelligence activities, ensuring economic security, counter-terrorism and weapons proliferation, combating organized crime, securing state classified information, and protecting Polish cyberspace operations. According to law, ABW investigations must be preceded by a warrant issued from a regional court after a request submitted by the head of the ABW. The ABW works closely with other security apparatuses in counter-intelligence and counter-terrorism operations to pool data, including the Agencja Wywiadu, the Policja, the Straż Graniczna and the Służba Ochrony Państwa.

The ABW also monitors corruption among state agencies and officials. According to its 2009 report, the ABW monitored 82 state enterprises undergoing privatization, as well as monitored the flow of European Union funds to Polish coffers. Ministries of state have been subject to investigations from the ABW for financial irregularities, including the ministries for Finance, National Defence, Environment, Justice, Interior and Administration, and GDDKiA.

Among the agency's powers, the ABW reserves the right to arrest individuals, search individuals and premises, inspect cargo from land, water and air transport, and request assistance from other Polish security services and government bodies.

The ABW's central operations center is located in the Mokotów borough of Warsaw along ul. Rakowiecka, standing in proximity to Mokotów Prison and the Ministry of Interior and Administration. The agency's training center is located in the village of Emów, 21 km (13 mi) east of Warsaw in Masovian Voivodeship. The ABW maintains offices in nearly all of Poland's major cities, including Białystok, Bydgoszcz, Gdańsk, Katowice, Kraków, Lublin, Łódź, Olsztyn, Opole, Poznań, Radom, Rzeszów, Szczecin, Warsaw, Wrocław and Zielona Góra. Additionally, the ABW maintains international liaison offices within Polish diplomatic missions in Berlin, Brussels, Kyiv, London, Moscow and Prague.

Internationally, the ABW works closely with the intelligence and security agencies of fellow NATO and European Union member states, as well as outside states including Afghanistan, Israel, Kazakhstan and Montenegro. The ABW also worked closely with the Security Service of Ukraine in preparation for the UEFA Euro 2012 over the coordination of security plans.

The ABW is involved in investigating the Polish railway cyberattack.

== Oversight ==
The activities of the ABW, along with those of the other special services (including the AW and the CBA), are overseen by the Prime Minister of Poland directly or through a specially appointed minister working within the Chancellery. The Head of the ABW reports to the prime minister regarding security matters of concern. The prime minister also retains the right to propose candidates to lead the ABW; nominated individuals are then subject to the opinion of the President of Poland. The president also reserves the right to receive information from the ABW Head regarding security concerns.

A Committee of Special Services under the Council of Ministers within the Chancellery retains responsibility for planning, coordinating and overseeing the activities of the ABW and all other special services. The agency's legal activities are tied to the Public Prosecutor General, who is regularly informed by the ABW's Head of the agency's course of actions. Additionally, the Special Services Committee within the Sejm evaluates the performance of the agency, giving opinions on budgetary concerns, investigations and cooperation among the special services.

== Controversies ==
In the aftermath of the 2010 Polish Air Force Tu-154 crash, killing President Lech Kaczyński and other senior members of the armed forces and government, members of the Law and Justice party alleged that leaked memos showed the agency had spied on the late president and First Lady Maria Kaczyńska during a state visit to Georgia in 2008.

In May 2011, the ABW conducted a dawn raid on the home of Robert Frycz, the owner of AntyKomor.pl, a satirical website critical of Polish president Bronisław Komorowski, citing that the website was in breach of Article 135 of the Polish Penal Code for insulting the president. In response to opposition allegations of stifling free speech, Prime Minister Donald Tusk stated afterward that the agency was a victim of the penal code's legal vagueness. Later, Prime Minister Tusk criticized the agency for acting "overzealous."

Marcin Idzik, who served as the CEO in the years 2013-2015 of the state-owned arms firm Bumar (since renamed Polski Holding Obronny-Polish Defense Holding) has alleged that in 2013 he asked for an investigation by the ABW of a former Bumar sales agent Pierre Dadak on suspicions of fraud. Dadak has been very closely associated with Krzysztof Węgrzyn, a wealthy businessman and former deputy defense minister, generally regarded as a member of the elite. Idzik claims that the ABW were unwilling to investigate Dadak, leading him to say: "I was the chief of the biggest Polish defense company and somebody wheedled money. For me, [is it] strange? Yeah, 400 percent." The ABW has refused to comment on the matter.

In June 2014, the ABW conducted a raid on the editorial office of the news magazine Wprost, after Wprost published stenographic records of private conversations between country officials implicating them in many unconstitutional acts and bribery. The ABW used physical force against the publication's editor-in-chief Sylwester Latkowski in an attempt to illegally seize his laptop computer, after he refused to give it away without court warrant.

== See also ==
- History of Polish intelligence services – 1989—present
