= Arms trafficking =

Illegal trafficking or smuggling of contraband weapons or ammunition

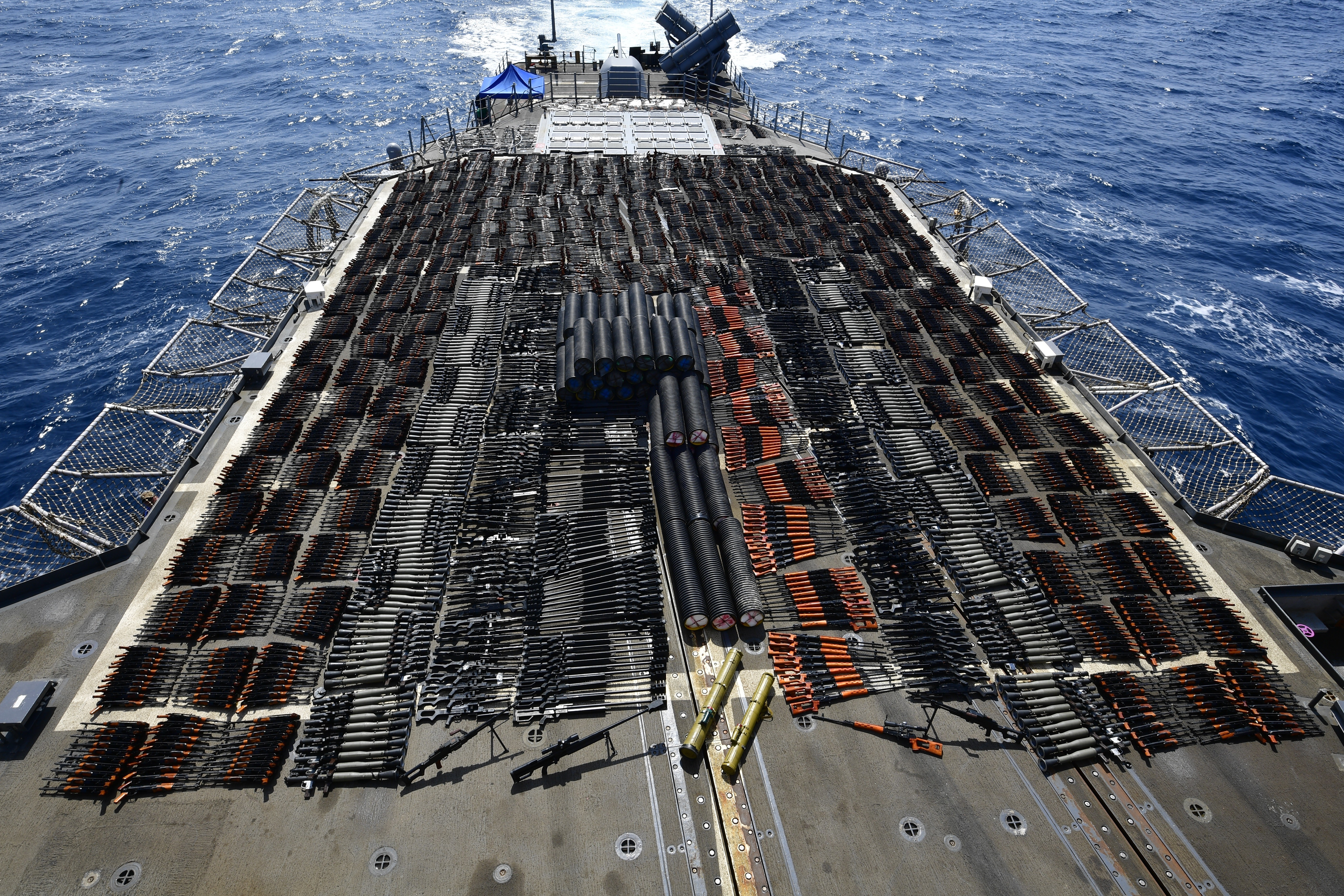
Illegally trafficked small arms and light weapons captured by the United States Fifth Fleet, May 2021

Weapons trafficking or gunrunning is the illicit trade of contraband small arms, explosives, and ammunition, which constitutes part of a broad range of illegal activities often associated with transnational criminal organizations. The illegal trade of small arms, unlike other organized crime commodities, is more closely associated with exercising power in communities instead of achieving economic gain. Scholars estimate illegal arms transactions amount to over US$1 billion annually.

To keep track of imports and exports of several of the most dangerous armament categories, in 1991 the United Nations created a Register for Conventional Arms. However, participation is not compulsory, and the Register lacks comprehensive data in regions outside of Europe. Africa is a region with an extensive illicit arms activity due to a prevalence of corrupt officials and loosely enforced trade regulations. In a resolution to complement the Register with legally binding obligations, a Firearms Protocol was incorporated into the UN Convention on Transnational Organized Crime, which requires states to improve systems that control trafficked ammunition and firearms.

The 1999 Report of the UN Panel of Governmental Experts on Small Arms provides a more refined and precise definition, which has become internationally accepted. This distinguishes between small arms (revolvers and self-loading pistols, rifles and carbines, submachine guns, assault rifles, and light machine guns), which are weapons designed for personal use, and light weapons (heavy machine guns, hand-held under-barrel and mounted grenade launchers, portable anti-aircraft guns, portable anti-tank guns, recoilless rifles, portable launchers of anti-aircraft missile systems, and mortars of calibres less than 100 mm), which are designed for use by several persons serving as a unit. Ammunition and explosives also form an integral part of small arms and light weapons used in conflict.

== Impact ==
=== Areas ===
Although arms trafficking is widespread in regions of political turmoil, it is not limited to such areas, and for example, in South Asia, an estimated 63 million guns have been trafficked into India and Pakistan.

The suppression of gunrunning is one of the areas of interest in the context of international law. In the United Nations, there has been widespread support to implement international legislation to prevent arms trafficking, however, it has been difficult to implement, due to many different factors that allow for arms trafficking to occur.

== Asia ==
Arms trafficking in Asia is a multifaceted issue, deeply intertwined with regional conflicts, organized crime, and governance challenges. In Southeast Asia, porous borders and post-conflict zones facilitate the smuggling of firearms, often linked to non-state actors, including separatists, criminal syndicates, and terrorist groups. The Association of Southeast Asian Nations (ASEAN) has recognized the gravity of this problem and has initiated cooperative measures, such as the ASEAN Plan of Action in Combating Transnational Crime, to enhance information exchange and law enforcement capacity building.

In South Asia, countries like India face significant challenges due to the influx of illegal small arms, which exacerbate internal security issues and insurgencies. The United Nations has facilitated regional workshops to address gun violence and illicit small arms trafficking, emphasizing the need for a gender perspective in policy formulation.

Western Asia, particularly the Middle East, has become a hotspot for arms trafficking, with weapons often recycled from past conflicts. This proliferation fuels ongoing instability and empowers organized crime groups, leading to a cycle of violence and insecurity. Efforts to combat arms trafficking in Asia are further complicated by the involvement of transnational organized crime groups, which operate across borders and engage in various illicit activities, including arms smuggling. International initiatives, like the United Nations Convention Against Transnational Organized Crime and its protocols, aim to provide a framework for cooperation and legal measures to address these challenges.

=== Israel and Palestine ===
Prior to the founding of Israel, law enforcement of the British Mandate of Palestine uncovered a cache of weapons in 359 drums of cement during the 1935 Cement Incident. Although no arrests were made, the listed recipient was a Jewish merchant named J. Katan. The incident led to a series of protests from Arab communities, and violent reprisals by armed groups loyal to Sheikh Izz ad-Din al-Qassam.

Shortly after the State of Israel was declared on May 14, 1948, the Arab-Israeli war broke out. During the war, the United States and later the United Nations imposed an arms embargo targeting all sides. Both Israel and the Arab League bought weapons from the black market to supply their forces. Notably, Czechoslovakia supplied Israel during Operation Balak and Operation Velvetta. Czechoslovakia also attempted to supply weapons to Syria on behalf of the Arab Liberation Army.

Throughout the Cold War, Israel still smuggled military equipment on a small scale. One example was the acquisition of five Sa'ar 3-class missile boat in the Cherbourg Project. These vessels were purchased from France, but were not delivered due to an arms embargo. Meanwhile, the Palestine Liberation Organization and other Palestinian armed groups secretly received weapons from the Warsaw Pact before official relations began.

Post-Cold War, groups such as Hamas smuggle weaponry via underground tunnels and boats. Other weapons are acquired through purchasing from corrupt Israel Defense Forces (IDF) soldiers or theft from Israeli settlements in the West Bank.

Ahmed Jibril, the leader of the Popular Front for the Liberation of Palestine-General Command claimed responsibility for attempting to smuggle weapons into the Gaza Strip using the Santorini fishing boat. The IDF claimed to disrupt other smuggling runs in the Karine A affair, Francop Affair, the Klos C cargo ship seizure, and the Victoria Affair.

=== Iran ===
Iran's arms trafficking operations are primarily orchestrated by the Islamic Revolutionary Guard Corps' (IRGC) Quds Force, notably through its specialized units, Unit 190 and Unit 700. These units are responsible for clandestine weapons transfers to Iranian-aligned groups across the Middle East, including Hezbollah in Lebanon, Hamas in Gaza, the Houthis in Yemen, and various militias in Syria and Iraq.

Unit 190 specializes in smuggling weapons by land, sea, and air, employing covert methods such as disguising arms shipments as civilian goods and using front companies to obscure the true nature of their operations. Unit 700, led by Ali Naji Gal Farsat, focuses on logistics and maritime smuggling routes, facilitating arms deliveries to Hezbollah via the Port of Beirut. These operations have adapted to regional dynamics, shifting from overland routes through Syria to maritime channels to evade detection.

In Yemen, Iran's support has significantly enhanced the military capabilities of the Houthi rebels, enabling them to conduct attacks on international shipping and regional adversaries. Despite international sanctions and efforts to curb these activities, Iran continues to provide advanced weaponry and training to the Houthis, contributing to ongoing instability in the region.

Iran has also been implicated in attempts to smuggle weapons into the West Bank, aiming to arm Palestinian factions and foment unrest against Israel. Israeli security forces have intercepted multiple shipments of Iranian-made weapons, including advanced arms intended for terror operatives in the region.

=== Myanmar (Burma) ===
Since the end of World War II, both the Myanmar military juntas and various rebel groups relied on smuggled arms to equip themselves. During the Cold War, weapons for anti-communist groups (such as the Kuomintang remnants) and the Communist Party of Burma were smuggled with indirect CIA and CCP support via Thailand and China, respectively. After the end of the Vietnam War, AK-47s, M-79 grenade launchers, and M16s began flowing into the hands of rebel groups such as U Nu's Parliamentary Democracy Party.

Meanwhile, the authoritarian government under Ne Win imported G3 rifles and MG 3 machine guns from West Germany in 1962 after student protests were violently suppressed. The State Administration Council junta under Min Aung Hlaing bought weapons and spare parts via Thai and Singapore intermediaries.

During the post-Cold War conflict, smuggled weaponry primarily consists of small arms cloned from the Chinese Type 56 and Type 81 platforms by the Kachin Independence Army and United Wa State Army. After the UWSA announced a restriction of weapons supply on 28 August 2025, speculation arose that this announcement contributed to a spike in black market arms prices. However, various factions still source their weapons from neighboring countries such as Thailand or India.

According to the BBC, explosive powders imported from China meant for mining operations is diverted to EAOs in Shan State for ammunition manufacturing.

=== North Korea ===
North Korea, via Room 39, engages in weapons smuggling to increase its foreign currency reserves. One alleged recipient of North Korean weaponry was the Liberation Tigers of Tamil Eelam. According to Professor Rohan Gunaratna, several LTTE members claimed that weapons were purchased with payments concluding at the Embassy of the Democratic People's Republic of Korea in Beijing. Around the same time, the former Sri Lanka Minister of Finance, Basil Rajapaksa supposedly admitted in a newspaper interview that the government bought weapons from North Korea during the Sri Lankan Civil War. Rajapaksa denied making those remarks.

When Panama detained the North Korean cargo ship, Chong Chon Gang, in mid-2013, it carried missile parts and MiG 21 planes from Cuba. Two other ships, Jie Shun and Kang Nam 1, were implicated in arms smuggling attempts as well.

=== Philippines ===
During the rule of Ferdinand Marcos, the New People's Army attempted to smuggle weapons from China in the MV Karagatan incident. Aside from internal theft and cross-border smuggling, criminals and insurgents in the Philippines source weapons from unlicensed workshops making firearms ranging from imitations of the 1911 pistol to single-shot .50 BMG long guns.

== Americas ==
=== Argentina ===
Under the presidency of Carlos Menem, 6,500 tons of weapons, including FAL rifles and howitzers, were smuggled to Croatia and Ecuador during the Yugoslav Wars and Cenepa War, respectively. The end-user certificates listed the destinations as Panama and Venezuela. These arms transfers violated UN arms embargos and peace treaties.

=== Colombia ===
In the 1980s Guns for Antigua scandal, the Medellin drug cartel used dubious end-user certificates purportedly meant for the Antigua and Barbuda Defence Force to equip itself with Israeli-made weapons.

According to a 2004 CIA report, FARC acquires its weapons both from Cold War stockpiles in neighboring countries and stolen Colombian Armed Forces inventory.

According to a leaked Colombian military intelligence report covering 2021 and 2022, the United States is the primary country of origin for seized trafficked weapons.

=== United States ===
During the American Civil War (1861–1865), the Confederacy lacked the financial and manufacturing capacity to wage war against the industrial and prosperous North. The Union Navy was enforcing the blockade along 3,500 miles of coast in the Southeast and Gulf of Mexico to prevent the smuggling of any material from or into the South. In order to increase its arsenal, the Confederacy looked to Britain as a major source of arms. British merchants and bankers funded the purchase of arms and construction of ships being outfitted as blockade runners which later carried war supplies bound for Southern ports. The chief figures for these acts were Confederate foreign agents James Dunwoody Bulloch and Charles K. Prioleau and Fraser, Trenholm and Co. based in Liverpool, England and merchants in Glasgow, Scotland. The smuggling of arms into the South by blockade runners carrying British supplies were easily facilitated using ports in the British colonies of Canada and the Bahamas, where the Union Navy could not enter. A British publication in 1862 summed up the country's involvement in blockade running:

Score after score of the finest, swiftest British steamers and ships, loaded with British material of war of every description, cannon, rifles by the hundreds of thousand, powder by the thousand of tons, shot, shell, cartridges, swords, etc, with cargo after cargo of clothes, boots, shoes, blankets, medicines and supplies of every kind, all paid for by British money, at the sole risk of British adventurers, well insured by Lloyds and under the protection of the British flag, have been sent across the ocean to the insurgents by British agency.

It was estimated the Confederates received thousands of tons of gunpowder, half a million rifles, and several hundred cannons from the blockade runners. American politician Charles Sumner claimed after the war that these supplies lengthened the war by two more years.

Ulysses S. Grant III, President of the American Civil War Centennial in 1961, remarked for example:

[B]etween October 26, 1864 and January 1865, it was still possible for 8,632,000 lbs of meat, 1,507,000 lbs of lead, 1,933,000 lbs of saltpeter, 546,000 pairs of shoes, 316,000 blankets, half a million pounds of coffee, 69,000 rifles, and 43 cannon to run the blockade into the port of Wilmington alone, while cotton sufficient to pay for these purchases was exported[. I]t is evident that the blockade runners made an important contribution to the Confederate effort to carry on.

In the United States, the term "Iron Pipeline" is sometimes used to describe Interstate Highway 95 and its connector highways as a corridor for arms trafficking into the New York City Metro Area.

=== Mexico ===
During the Mexican Revolution, gunrunning into Mexico reached rampant levels with the majority of the arms being smuggled from the United States. As Mexico manufactured no weapons of its own, acquiring arms and ammunition were one of the main concerns of the various rebels, intent on armed revolution. Under American law at the time, arms smugglers into Mexico could be prosecuted only if one was caught in flagrante delicto crossing the border as merely buying arms with the intention of gunrunning into Mexico was not a criminal offense. Given the length and often rugged terrain of the American-Mexican border, the undermanned American border service simply could not stop the massive gunrunning into Mexico.

In February 1913-February 1914, President Woodrow Wilson imposed an arms embargo on both sides of the Mexican civil war, and not until February 1914 was the embargo lifted on arms sales to the Constitutionalist rebels. Despite the arms embargo, there was much gunrunning into Mexico, as one American official complained in 1913: "our border towns are practically their commissary and quartermaster depots". Guns were smuggled into Mexico via barrels, coffins, and false bottoms of automobiles. General Huerta avoided the American arms embargo by buying weapons from Germany.

In the Mexican drug war, the primary foreign sources for weaponry are the United States and various countries in Central and South America. In March 1997, customs agents discovered "two truckloads" of grenade launchers and M2 carbines in a warehouse at the Port of Long Beach. These weapons were purportedly imported from Vietnam and law enforcement speculated that drug cartels were the recipient. During the controversial Operation Fast and Furious, the ATF attached GPS trackers to firearms before they were straw-purchased to cartels in order to arrest leading figures. Many of the tracking systems were lost, resulting in multiple firearms ending up in the hands of criminal groups.

== Africa ==
=== Somalia ===
From 1992 to 2023, the United Nations imposed a widespread arms embargo on Somalia after full-scale civil war followed the fall of the Siad Barre regime. In spite of the embargo, weapons were openly sold in markets such as the Bakaara Market; many of the weapons primarily originated from either Transitional Federal Government stocks or Yemen. These firearms ended up in the hands of warlords, the Islamic Courts Union, and Al-Shabaab.

Tomislav Damnjanović, a Serbian businessman connected to former president, Slobodan Milošević, allegedly sold weapons to the ICU as he was simultaneously contracted to supply US-led Coalition forces in Iraq and Afghanistan.

=== Liberia and Sierra Leone conflicts ===
The civil war in Sierra Leone lasted from 1991 to 2002, and left 75,000 people dead. Gunrunning played a significant role in this conflict. Weapons of all sorts were shipped to all sides in both Sierra Leone, and Liberia from abroad. These included small arms, such as, pistols, assault rifles, grenades, Claymores, knives, machetes, etc. Larger weapons such as missiles, light machine guns, mortars, anti-tank missiles, tanks, and planes were also used. During this time a civil war was occurring in nearby Liberia. The Liberian Civil Wars took place from 1989 through 1997. The war was between the existing government and the National Patriotic Front. Leader of the National Patriotic Front of Liberia, Charles Taylor, helped to create the Revolutionary United Front (RUF) in Sierra Leone. Taylor was the recipient of thousands of illegally trafficked arms from eastern Europe (mostly Ukraine). Taylor then sold some of these weapons to the RUF in exchange for diamonds. President of Burkina Faso, Blaise Compaore, "directly facilitated Liberia's arms-for-diamonds trade" with Liberia and Sierra Leone. Compaore would give guns to Taylor, who would then sell them to the RUF in exchange for diamonds. These blood diamonds would then be sold back to Compaore for more guns. The cyclical exchange allowed Compaore the ability to deny directly sending arms to Sierra Leone.

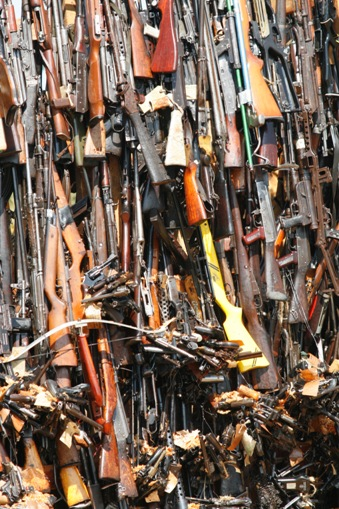
A tower of confiscated smuggled weapons about to be set ablaze in Nairobi, Kenya

The Liberian government received arms through an elaborate front company in Guinea. The arms were intended to be shipped (legally) from Uganda to Slovakia. However, the arms were diverted to Guinea as a part of "an elaborate bait and switch". Additionally the British government "encouraged Sandline International, a private security firm and non state entity, to supply arms and ammunitions to the loyal forces of the exiled government of President Kabbah." Sandline proceeded 35 tons of arms from Bulgaria, to Kabbah's forces.

=== The South Sudanese civil war ===
Ever since the South Sudanese civil war began in December 2013, gunrunning into that nation has reached rampant levels. As South Sudan has hardly any electricity and no manufacturing, both sides were entirely dependent upon buying arms from abroad to fight their war. President Salva Kiir used shadowy networks of arms dealers from China, Uganda, Israel, Egypt and Ukraine to arm his forces. As oil companies paid rent for their concessions in South Sudan, the government was able to afford to buy arms on a lavish scale. In June 2014, the government's National Security Service signed a deal worth $264 million US dollars with a Seychelles-based shell company to buy 30 tanks, 50,000 AK-47 assault rifles and 20 million bullets. The owner of the shell company currently remains unknown. In July 2014, the Chinese arms manufacturer Norinco delivered a shipment to South Sudan of 95,000 assault rifles and 20 million rounds of ammunition, supplying enough bullets to kill every person in South Sudan twice over. The American arms dealer and private military contractor, Erik Prince, sold to the government for $43 million three Mi-24 attack helicopters and two L-39 jets together with the services of Hungarian mercenary pilots to operate the aircraft. The majority of the arms supplied to South Sudan from Uganda originated from Romania, Bulgaria and Slovakia, all which are members of the European Union (EU), and were supposed to abide by an EU arms embargo placed on South Sudan in 2011.

Less is known about the very secretive arms dealers supplying the rebel Sudan People's Liberation Movement-in-Opposition (SPLM-IO) led by Riek Machar other than that the majority of the gunrunners appeared to be European. A rare exception was with the Franco-Polish arms dealer Pierre Dadak who was arrested on 14 July 2016 at his villa in Ibiza on charges of gunrunning into South Sudan. At his villa, the Spanish National Police Corps allege that they found documents showing he was negotiating to sell Machar 40,000 AK-47 assault rifles, 30,000 PKM machine guns and 200,000 boxes of ammunition.

The United Nations Panel of Experts on South Sudan in a 2017 report declared: "Reports from independent sources indicate that the border areas between South Sudan and the Sudan and Uganda remain key entry points for arms, with some unsubstantiated reports of smaller numbers of weapons also crossing into South Sudan from the Democratic Republic of the Congo. There are also persistent reports and public accusations of shipments to forces affiliated with the leadership in Juba from further afield, specifically from Egypt". The same report stated that a Ukrainian Air Force IL-76 transport jet flew in two L-39 jets to Uganda on 27 January 2017 in the full knowledge the L-39 jets were intended to go on to South Sudan, thereby violating the arms embargo Ukraine had placed on arms sales to South Sudan. In 2018, the United Nations Security Council imposed a worldwide arms embargo on South Sudan, but the embargo has been widely ignored where despite a ceasefire signed the same year, both sides have continued to import arms on a massive scale, suggesting that they are preparing for another bout of the civil war.

== Europe ==
Since 1996, countries throughout Europe have taken notice of arms trafficking. Europe has been an overall large exporter of illicit weapons with the United Kingdom, Germany, and France in the national lead for the most exports. Imports to Europe from 2004 to 2013 have decreased by 25%, with the United Kingdom importing the most overall in Europe. The firearms that are imported and passed around are commonly small arms and lighter weapons (SALW) compared to large machinery, such as tanks and aircraft. The SALW bought in Europe tends to be secondhand weapons that are cheap and regularly available. Gun cultures, such as in Germany, where the "taken-for-granted cultural practice of carrying a handgun," increases illicit SALW because guns are viewed as a way to enhance masculinity and status. In 2000, the Organization for Security and Co-operation in Europe (OSCE) started on regional solutions and security measures to address the firearms trafficking problem.

=== Northern Ireland ===
During and after the early 20th-century Irish revolutionary period, both Republican and Unionist factions clandestinely acquired arms from multiple sources. Prior to the Easter Rising, the Imperial German government attempted to smuggle Mosin-Nagant rifles to Irish rebels using the SS Libau ship in 1916, but failed. The more successful 1914 Howth gun-running operation yielded obsolete Mauser M1871 black-powder rifles. During The Troubles, the Provisional IRA implemented a sophisticated weapons smuggling network where small arms were primarily acquired from American sympathisers and the Libyan Arab Jamahiriya.

Before World War I, the Ulster Unionist Council initiated the Larne gun-running operation in April 1914 where they successfully brought in weapons and ammunition from the German Empire using motor vehicles to transport the cargo inland. However, the Unionist arms procurement network during The Troubles faced less success in contrast to the PIRA networks. Although they acquired some weapons from South African arms dealers and sympathizers from abroad, internal theft and improvisation remained a primary source of small arms logistics.

=== Hezbollah's Europe smuggling network ===
In 2024-2025 European authorities investigated Hezbollah's drone smuggling network in Europe. This network, developed and operated by Hezbollah with support from Iran's Islamic Revolutionary Guard Corps (IRGC), involved the transnational procurement and logistics of unmanned aerial vehicle (UAV) components. The smuggling operation spanned several countries, including Spain, Germany, France, and the United Kingdom. The investigation resulted in multiple arrests and prosecutions.

== Global market value ==
Though one of the least profitable illegal trades, arms trafficking made an estimated $1.7-3.5 billion in 2014, making it the 9th largest criminal market, which was valued at $1.6-2.2 trillion.

The AK-47 is one of the most appealing weapons in the illegal weapons trade due to its low cost and reliability. In Iraq, a smuggled AK-47 typically costs $150–300. In the first sixth months of the 2003 invasion of Iraq, the influx of new weapons lowered the AK-47's price, to the point the weapon was sold for as low as $25, or sometimes, nothing. Comparatively, AK-47s sold on the Dark web in the United States can cost as much as $3,600, as the price of illegal arms is increased greatly by the distance it must travel, due to the induced risk. A handgun trafficked from the United States to Canada can have its price increase by 560% from just crossing the border. Weapons smuggled overseas will usually take several, short trips with multiple companies to mask the country of origin and the original sellers.

In the United States, biker gangs have been connected to arms trafficking. United States law enforcement agencies started investigating bike gangs in the late 90s, and started classifying them as organized criminal organizations. This was mainly due to the fact that they were able to get control of the prostitution market and the smuggling of stolen goods such as weapons, motorcycles, and car parts.

== Regulation ==
Prosecuting arms traffickers and brokers has proven difficult due to loopholes in national laws. In 2000, Israeli arms dealer Leonid Minin was arrested in Italy for drug possession, and while serving his sentence, Italian police found over 1,500 pages of forged end-user certificates and transfers of money which implicated him in trafficking arms to the Revolutionary United Front in Sierra Leone. Minin was released in December 2002, as according to Italian law, he could not be tried because the weapons he had sold had never reached Italy. Additionally, some arms dealers will operate in countries where they cannot be extradited. Arms traffickers are also able to evade capture due to a lack of co-operation between nations, especially in Africa and ex-Soviet states.

== Related theories ==
In the international criminal scholarly community, rational choice theory is commonly referenced in explanations as to why individuals engage in and justify criminal activity. According to Jana Arsovska and Panos Kostakos, leading scholars on organized crime, the causes of arms trafficking are not solely based on rational choice theory but rather have been more closely linked to the intimacy of one's personal social networks as well as the "perception of risks, effort and rewards in violating criminal laws."

== In popular culture ==
=== Film ===
- Lord of War (2005), a crime war film in which Nicolas Cage plays a fictional arms dealer named Yuri Orlov, who was based on the real Viktor Bout. The film was endorsed by Amnesty International for highlighting arms trafficking. Lord of War's DVD release featured Making a Killing: Inside the International Arms Trade, a 15-minute documentary about arms trafficking.
- War Dogs (2016), a dark comedy drama biographical film based on the true story of two young men, David Packouz and Efraim Diveroli, who won a $300 million contract from the Pentagon to arm America's allies in Afghanistan and later became involved in arms trafficking.

=== Television ===
- Sons of Anarchy, a crime drama about a fictional outlaw motorcycle club whose main source of income is trafficking arms to a variety of criminal enterprises domestically and internationally.
- Jormungand, an anime television series based on the manga series by Keitarō Takahashi, focused on an illicit arms dealer and her child soldier bodyguard.

== See also ==
- Annie Larsen affair
- Arms Crisis
- Arms control
- Cuban packages
- Conflict Armament Research
- International Action Network on Small Arms
- SS John Grafton
- List of illegal arms dealers
- Purulia arms drop case
- Polish arms sales to Republican Spain
- Small Arms Survey
- Smuggling
- Transporte Aéreo Rioplatense
- United States v. Curtiss-Wright Export Corp
