= Arrowhead Pawn Shop =

Coordinates: 33°34′43.3″N 84°22′31.8″W

Arrowhead Pawn Shop is a pawn shop and part of the Iron Pipeline. It was founded in 1991 and is located in Jonesboro, Georgia. The store was described as the most significant source outside of New York State of guns recovered by the New York Police Department in 2009. After a gun from the shop was used in the murders of two New York City Police Department (NYPD) officers, The New York Times reported that Arrowhead ranked fifth on the U.S.-wide list of legal sources of guns used in crimes. The newspaper quoted an anonymous federal official as stating that "[Arrowhead] were like a Crazy Eddie of gun dealers. They had a lot of volume and they did a lot of business." The Brady Center to Prevent Gun Violence describes Arrowhead as a "notorious 'bad apple' gun dealer", having sold over 1720 guns that were subsequently used in crimes.

Arrowhead Pawn Shop was rebuilt in 2007 following a fire; retail space quadrupled from 2,000 square feet to 8,000 square feet in the new premises. As of 2014, the store's chief executive is Arthur Banks. The shop describes itself as "a family owned business dedicated to good prices, good customer service and good vibes".
