= Jacques Monsieur =

Belgian arms dealer

Jacques Monsieur (1952 or 1953) is a Belgian convicted large arms trafficker. He is one of the biggest weapons smugglers in the world and is currently incarcerated in Saint-Gilles Prison.

In 2018, he was sentenced to four years in prison by the Court of Appeals in Brussels and fined €1.2 million. He subsequently fled. He was 66 years old when he was arrested in Portugal in August 2019.
