= Iron Pipeline =

Route used to smuggle firearms

The Iron Pipeline is the route in the United States used to smuggle weapons from ten states mostly in the Southern United States to Mid-Atlantic states and New England, particularly states with stricter gun laws such as New York and New Jersey.

== Overview ==
Physically, the term "Iron Pipeline" denotes Interstate 95 (I-95) and its connector highways. It is dubbed so by the Bureau of Alcohol, Tobacco, Firearms and Explosives (ATF), as well as politicians, law enforcement officials, and organizations such as Mayors Against Illegal Guns. The latter organization produced a report in 2010 based on information provided by ATF, and concluded that "in 2009 ten states (Arizona, California, Georgia, Florida, Indiana, North Carolina, Ohio, Pennsylvania, Texas and Virginia) supplied almost half the interstate-trafficked guns recovered at crime scenes".

== Impact on the United States ==
In May 2015, after it was determined that the gun used in the shooting of NYPD officer Brian Moore was stolen from a gun store in Perry, Georgia, US Senator Chuck Schumer from New York called for a "federal crackdown" on the Iron Pipeline. According to WCBS 880, "90 percent of guns recovered at New York City crime scenes come from out-of-state". According to The New York Times, the Iron Pipeline is "one of the biggest factors thwarting New York in its efforts to keep guns off the streets and out of the hands of criminals".

On January 5, 2016, president Barack Obama publicly announced executive actions to clarify laws on background checks, and to hire additional ATF and FBI agents. President Obama stated that, "Guns cross state lines as easily as cars do. If your state has strong gun laws but the neighboring state does not have strong gun laws, the guns come into your state. That's called the Iron Pipeline."

Some 500,000 guns are trafficked into Mexico each year. As of January 2, 2023, Mexico has sued the US gun industry − or certain of its members – in two U.S. courts. For all civil plaintiffs, the primary impediment is the 2005 Protection of Lawful Commerce in Arms Act. But numerous public officials have supported such actions via amicus curiae briefs.

== See also ==
- Arrowhead Pawn Shop
