= Tomislav Damnjanovic =

Serbian businessman and arms smuggler

Tomislav Damnjanović is a Serbian businessman and arms smuggler. A former employee of Yugoslavia's national airline, Damnjanović founded his own company transporting supplies aboard an Ilyushin Il-76 freight carrier. With increasing United Nations sanctions on Yugoslavian airlines, he began to expand his operations into illegal smuggling. He attained notoriety in 2002 when he was contracted to deliver "millions of rounds of ammunition, guns, grenades and mortars" to aid the US military during the ongoing War In Iraq and War in Afghanistan. At the time, United Nations officials investigating his previous activities discovered a 15 year history of weapons deals with Libyan, Liberian, Republic of the Congo officials as well as Al Qaeda-linked Islamist groups in Somalia and other smuggling deals backed Yugoslav president Slobodan Milošević. The United Nations claimed that in 2006, 45 tons of supplies were sold to the Islamic Courts Union at the same time as Damnjanović was contracted to supply US forces.

Though the investigation is still ongoing, its revelations called into question the United States's efforts to track smugglers, and the "profiling system" used to check the backgrounds of potential arms dealers. In 2007, a United Nations case study on Damnjanović referred to him as an "invisible arms trafficker", claiming that he "worked outside the law. transporting weapons for US companies and weapons manufacturers based in America while at the same time using chartered flights in Africa and the Middle East in illegal operations to supply, among others, Saddam Hussein, Charles Taylor, the Myanmar military junta, Muammar Gaddafi and Islamic militants in Mogadishu. Damnjanović was linked to other arms dealers such as Viktor Bout too.
