= Krzysztof Węgrzyn =

Former Deputy Defense Minister of Poland

- Born: 1950 (age 75–76)
- Education: Tadeusz Kościuszko University of Technology
- Occupations: businessman, engineer, civil servant
- Years active: 1974-
- Known for: Serving as Deputy Defense Minister

Krzysztof Ludwik Węgrzyn (born 1950) is a Polish businessman, engineer and civil servant who served as the Deputy Defense Minister between 1996–1997.

== Life and career ==
In 1974, he graduated with a degree in organic engineering at the Tadeusz Kościuszko University of Technology in Kraków. He enjoyed success in his field of chemistry and claims to have taken out several "profitable" chemistry-related patents over the years. Wegrzyn served on the board of directors of Gamrat SA, one of Poland's largest manufacturers of plastics, and has also served as the president of Organika Vilniu in Lithuania. In 1993, became the founder and the first president of the Union of Employers of Defense and Aviation Industry Enterprises.

From 10 May 10, 1996 to 17 November 1997, he served as Undersecretary of State in the Ministry of National Defence, responsible for armaments and infrastructure. As deputy defense minister, he played a key role in preparing Poland to join the North Atlantic Treaty Organization (NATO) by buying weapons from the Western nations. His notable act as deputy defense minister was to buy 29 PT-91 Twardy tanks from the state-owned defense company Bumar. In 1996, during a visit to the United States to purchase American aircraft for the Polish Air Force, he stated: "We simply cannot afford to buy arms in such a way that we just take cash out of the bank. The euphoria of suddenly getting modern aircraft has subsided. We have now become very calculating." In 1997, he stated it would cost the Treasury some 10 billion zlotys per year for the next five years to make the Polish armed forces ready for NATO, but that he had only a tenth of what was required, thus requiring careful investments. Wegrzyn stated his focus was on improving command and control in the armed forces by buying communications gear compatible with other NATO forces. After leaving public office, he became a manager in TopGaN, a company that produces specialized lasers. In 2005, Wegrzyn was named in a public letter by the Sejm MP Zygmunt Wrzodak concerning allegations of financial improprieties.

Wegrzyn is active in the defense industry and has attracted controversy by investing in Rosevar Holdings, a company registered in Cyprus, which was managed by the arms dealer Pierre Dadak. Besides for being Dadak's business partner, Wegrzyn has been described in the media as his patron who introduced him to influential figures. From October 2014 onward, Dadak who lived in Ibiza was under investigation by the Spanish National Police Corps under the suspicion of fraud, money laundering and gunrunning into South Sudan (which placed under a European Union embargo in 2011). Dadak's phone was taped and police records showed that he often called Wegrzyn. In one phone call, Dadak told Wegrzyn "The merchandise is there and we can act" and spoke about "cars and ammunition". In an interview, Wegrzyn denied that he still doing business with Dadak or being involved in gunrunning into the South Sudanese civil war; when asked what the phone calls were about, Wegrzyn claimed not to remember.

In March 2017, an investigation was started concerning allegations of internal theft at Bumar. The investigators believe that the stolen arms may have been sold by Rosevar Holdings. The investigators received threatening text messages warning both they and their families would be killed if they did not cease the investigation. The investigators believe that the stolen arms may have been sold by Rosevar Holdings. Wegrzyn has been described in media reports as an associate of Dadak with Newsweek Polska writing: "Throughout Pierre Dadak's activity in Poland and his work for Bumar, Węgrzyn was somewhere next to him. Always in the shadows". Wegrzyn stated he went into business with Dadak "to help Polish industry conquer new markets", but he claimed he only provided him with "consulting services".

== Books ==
- Simon, Jeffery (1996). NATO Enlargement and Central Europe: A Study in Civil-military Relations. Collingdale: DIANE Publishing. ISBN 1428981586.
- Simon, Jeffery (2004). Poland and NATO: A Study in Civil-military Relations. Lanham: Rowman & Littlefield. ISBN 0742529940.
