= End-user certificate =

Document in international arms sales

An end-user certificate, or EUC, is a document used in international transfers, including sales and arms provided as aid, of weapons and ammunition to certify that the buyer is the final recipient of the materials and does not plan on transferring the materials to another. EUCs are required by many governments to restrict the movement of military materials to undesired destinations, such as non-state actors under an international or domestic embargo, governments with bad human rights records or states that are considered to be threats by the original supplier of the arms.

== Issues ==
There are several problems with EUCs as a means to prevent undesirable arms exports: EUCs can be forged or falsified. They can also be obtained from corrupt officials and so there is a need for EUCs that are difficult to forge. Another problem is that an EUC does not guarantee that the arms recipient will actually live up to its promise not to transfer the weapons received. EUCs that are not backed up by proper end-use monitoring are weak.

In 1936 to 1938, German arms were supplied to both sides in the Spanish Civil War via Greece using Greek and Mexican end-user certificates via the Pyrkal arms company.
