= Pierre Dadak =

French-Polish arms dealer (born 1976)

Pierre Konrad Dadak
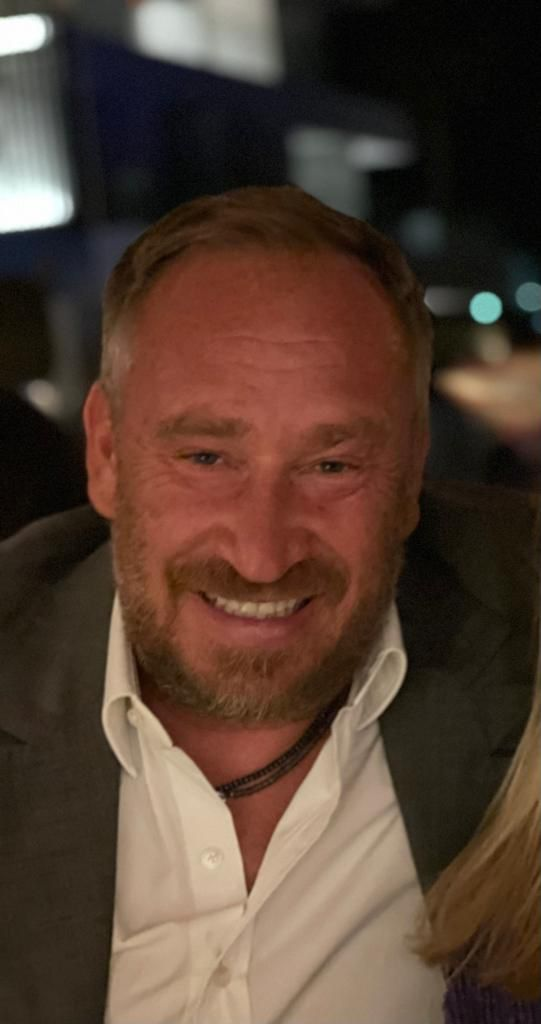
- Born: 28 March 1976 (age 50); Paris, France
- Occupation: Arms dealer
- Years active: 1999–2016
- Known for: Extortion, tax evasion, money laundering, death threats, and gunrunning in Africa

Pierre Konrad Dadak (born 28 March 1976) is a French-Polish alleged arms dealer and fraudster. He is a controversial character portrayed in media as being at the center of a web of corruption extending from Europe to Africa. Dadak maintains his innocence, telling a Spanish court in 2018: "I am being made to pass for a Pablo Escobar, but I am nothing and I am not charged with drug or arms trafficking". In 2018, the Times referred him as one of "Europe's leading arms dealers"

== Private life ==
Dadak was born in Paris, the son of Polish immigrants. Though Dadak grew up in Paris, he also holds Polish citizenship. Dadak's father was an engineer, a graduate of the Warsaw University of Technology while his mother was a graduate of the Academy of Fine Arts. Dadak grew up in an upper-middle-class family in the 18th arrondissement. He was educated at the Lycée Jules Ferry and at an elite business school, the Institut supérieur de gestion, graduating in 1999. Dadak is reported to have attended courses at New York University. French is Dadak's first language, but he is said to speak Polish, Spanish and English very well.

As a young man, he was known for frequenting the posh 16th arrondissement of Paris and tony clubs in the south of France as he sought to maintain a flashy lifestyle. One man who knew him stated: "At 25, Dadak was already driving a Ferrari.

Between 2000 and 2006, Dadak was arrested five times in France and was "known [to police] for offenses of concealment, fraud, use of false administrative documents, tax evasion, theft, and voluntary violence." Dadak worked for a time for a military contractor who supplied arms and uniforms in Françafrique. His former employer recalled: "I never really made him work. Simply, he had to get info and contacts for us and at Milipol or Eurosatory [defense and security fairs], where we were one of the main exhibitors. He was handsome, cheerful, intelligent, and very ambitious." Dadak's last known job in France was with a software company in Paris in 2008.

== Arms dealer ==
By 2009, he had moved to Warsaw, where he began to work as an arms dealer and found an influential patron in the form of Krzysztof Węgrzyn, a wealthy businessman who had previously served as deputy minister of defense. Though Dadak had worked for software companies in France, in Poland he falsely claimed to be a retired colonel in the French Army. In February 2010, Dadak started working as a sales agent for Bumar, the state-owned arms company (since renamed as Polski Holding Obronny-Polish Defense Holding) with the responsibility for sales in Africa and Latin America. As part of his work, Dadak created Rosevar Holdings, a company registered in Cyprus and whose shares were 10% owned by Węgrzyn. According to records, Rosevar Holdings was registered in Cyprus on 7 October 2009 and was dissolved on 11 January 2016. Dadak presented himself as the "shareholder president" of Rosevar Holdings, which was a subsidiary of Bumar. To his French friends, Dadak claimed to be a lieutenant colonel in the Polish Army, a claim which is not supported by Polish records, though he is in the French reserves.

Węgrzyn stated he went into business with Dadak "to help Polish industry conquer new markets", but he claimed he only provided him with "consulting services". In Poland, several journalists have stated that based upon interviews with current and former Bumar employees that Dadak would never have been employed at Bumar except through Węgrzyn's influence. In a statement to the press, the Polski Holding Obronny stated that Dadak made no sales during the time he was employed at the company between 2010 and 2012. Several former employees of the company accused Dadak of engaging in unethical business practices. In 2010, Dadak purchased a luxury villa in Ibiza, where he lived with his common-law wife, a Ukrainian model named Katerina Dirgina. In 2010, Dadak signed his first arms deal on behalf of Bumar to sell armored vehicles, anti-aircraft missiles, and ammunition worth some 912 millions USD to the Colombian military, but the company insists that the deal never went through. Вut after 8 years of investigations by the Spanish, French, American, Belgian, German and Polish authorities, the reality shows that Pierre Dadak legally and officially sold more than 2.5 billion Euros of military equipment in Africa, South America and UAE. making him one of the largest active arms dealers.

Dadak was accused of approaching wealthy businessmen abroad with promises that they could serve as the exclusive sales agents for Bumar in certain territories in exchange for which he would be paid licensing fees and company registration. Dadak would often take businessmen with him on trips to meet African leaders. One Canadian businessman, Thierry Carbou, who did business with Dadak, stated: "This was his technique with his victims who, meanwhile, opened their address book and made appointments with heads of state and ministers". Carbou went with Dadak on a trip in January 2012 to meet President Yahya Jammeh of the Gambia aboard a Bombardier Challenger 601 jetliner owned by the Gambian state and made available for Dadak's use upon the orders of President Jammeh himself. Also accompanying them on the trip to Banjul were two Lebanese businessmen and two bodyguards for Dadak from the Government Protection Bureau (BOR). Along the way, Dadak had the airplane land in Marseille to pick up le milieu gangster Franck Barresi, though for what purpose remains unclear. Carbou told the press: "I remember that Franck Barresi wasn't comfortable. He was saying 'I don't know what I'm doing here.'" Barresi only spoke to Dadak and shunned the company of the others.

After several days of talks in Banjul, an agreement was signed to sell arms to the Gambia and Dadak was paid a sum equal to US$100,000 in fees, though his partners allege that the promised profits from the arms deal to the Gambia never materalised. Richard Jreissati, one of the Lebanese businessmen who went with Dadak to the Gambia in 2012 told reporters: "I mean, everything he said was lies. The big enigma for me, is why all of this happened?" Both Jreissati and Carbou stated in interviews that Dadak appeared to be friendly with senior executives at Bumar and Wegrzyn was his most important patron. In an interview with Le Monde, Dadak stated his work was "geopolitical forecasting and analysis for Poland and Bumar".

Between 2010 and 2016, Dadak was involved in arms deals negotiations in The Gambia, Myanmar, Colombia, Libya, India, Cameroon, Argentina, Chile, Guatemala, and the United Arab Emirates. In 2011, the French police began an investigation of Marseilles's Barresi crime family, headed by three brothers Franck, Jean-Luc and Bernard on the suspicion of money laundering. In 2016, it was estimated the Barresi brothers' criminal organization made annual profits of at least €34 million. As part of the investigation of the Barresis, the French police began to investigate Dadak, suspecting one of Dadak's companies, Vinams Enterprises, was used as a front for money laundering by the Barresi family. In October 2012, the French police contracted the police in Kraków for requests for more information on Vinams Enterprises, which was also used by Dadak to collect on the down payments relating to his arms business. According to records, Vinams Enterprises was registered in Cyprus on 29 October 2010 and was dissolved on 21 January 2015.

In December 2012, Bumar ended its relationship with Dadak, terminating him for his failure to make any sales. In an interview, Dadak claims that his failure as an agent for Bumar was due to political inference by the government of Prime Minister Donald Tusk who wanted him to fail for political reasons. Marcin Idzik, the vice-president of Bumar who later served as its CEO said about Dadak's firing: "He didn't bring any contracts to us. We decided we should end cooperation with him, because there was no added value." The Spanish authorities investigation shows very different reality. The cooperation between Bumar and several other arms suppliers such as the swedish SAAB or the american Northrop Grumman and Pierre Dadak began in 2005 and never really stopped. it appears according to the investigation of the various european police several hundred transactions totally legal but covered by the "secret defense" in several countries. However, the investigation and the report of the Spanish judge Santiago Pedraz of the Spanish National audience confirms that these operations have existed thanks to the different traves of income taxes paid by Pierre Dadak.

In Ibiza, the playboy Dadak was well known for his "extravagant lifestyle", owning a private jet and eating at the exclusive and expensive Blue Marlin restaurant; for his friendship with the Barresi brothers, and always being surrounded by well armed bodyguards. Dadak is reported to have spent €20,000 on turning his Ibiza villa into a fortress with bullet-proof windows and motion-detector sensors on the grounds. One Frenchman living on Ibiza, Cyril Peret, told the media: "On the island, he didn't have many friends; his lifestyle scared people a little". Another friend who had known him in Paris reported: "When I found him on the island, Pierre was always the same, smiling, sympathetic, enjoying life. But his status and his lifestyle had changed dramatically. He was soaring. Everyone suspected that something was going to fall on him".

Dadak's primary residence was his Ibiza villa, but he also owned a luxury apartment in Warsaw, which he purchased for €3 million in 2010. News reports claim he was delinquent on paying the half-million euro debt he was alleged to have run up on his credit card. A 2016 profile in Newsweek Polska stated that Dadak was known in Warsaw for his high level of spending and for boasting about having influential friends. One businessman who first met Dadak at the Szpilka cafe in Warsaw in the fall of 2011 remembered him for wearing an expensive coat made of rabbit fur and for driving a Porsche, giving off the air of luxury and extravagance. Though Dadak owned several Lamborghinis and Ferraris, it was reported that he refused to pay for the labor cost of installing a €12,000 glass shower door at his Ibiza villa. When the contractor pressed for payment, Dadak is alleged to have threatened to kill him as he is said to have told the contractor: "I will put you in a glass jar".

Dadak is alleged to have continued to misrepresent himself as an agent for Bumar for several years afterward after leaving the company in 2012, continuing to hand out business cards that misidentified him as the Bumar sales agent for Africa and Latin America. In April 2013, an Indian immigrant to Canada named Rakesh Sharma complained to the Polish embassy in Ottawa about Dadak's business practices. Sharma, a businessman based in Montreal, had been working with Dadak since 2011 in hopes of securing arms deals in Argentina, Chile, Guatemala and India, which cost him almost $1 million Canadian dollars in fees to Dadak without any business materializing. Sharma alleges that after making the complaint, Dadak threatened his life, saying: "He called me and he said ‘I'm going to destroy you and kill all your family, I'm an arms dealer, you don't know me, I'm this, I'm that".

The complaint from Canada led Idzik to allege that he asked for investigation of Dadak in Poland by the Agencja Bezpieczeństwa Wewnętrznego (ABW). Idzik, the CEO of Bumar from 2013 to 2015 alleges that the ABW were unwilling to investigate Dadak because they could not find him, leading him to say: "I was the chief of the biggest Polish defense company and somebody wheedled money. For me, [is it] strange? Yeah, 400 percent." The public prosecutor's office in Warsaw in a statement to the press denied there was any investigation of Dadak in 2013 and the ABW refused to comment. In 2013, BOR launched an internal investigation as to how Dadak obtained the services of its agents, of which the results were that it was decided not to sack any employees.

In early 2013, Dadak and Dirgina visited Guinea-Bissau where they met President Manuel Serifo Nhamadjo. In exchange for promising to invest in gambling and banking in Guinea-Bissau, Dadak was appointed a diplomat for Guinea-Bissau, granting him diplomatic immunity. Afterwards, Dadak paid €60,000 to Gabriel Plaza Herrera, the honorary consul for Guinea-Bissau in Málaga, who gave him a diplomatic passport. Without seeking permission, Dadak also attached a plaque outside of his Ibiza villa declaring it a consulate for Guinea-Bissau. Dadak did not perform any diplomatic work for Guinea-Bissau and instead declared himself the "special economic adviser" to the president of Guinea-Bissau. In 2017, it was reported that his Guinean passport was fraudulently obtained.

In October 2013, Dadak went to Port-au-Prince, Haiti, together with two Canadian businessmen to meet President Michel Martelly with a $20 billion plan to develop Île-à-Vache, an island which as a French police report noted is "known as a storage place for cocaine in transit to the United States or Europe." He went with a former Haitian senator Joseph Lambert to Île-à-Vache and accordingly to the same police report "for an unknown reason [Dadak] threatened the former Senator Joseph Lambert with death."After causing a ruckus by trying to "obtain discount on the final hotel bill" at his hotel, Dadak left Port-au-Prince without paying his hotel bill.

In late 2013, Dadak set up a company named Polietica, which was registered in the United States and was purported to sell plastics and polymers, through it appears to have been used as part of Dadak's arms dealing. According to an official document notarized by Don Fernando Ramos Gil notary in Barcelona, Ibiza and Madrid, Polietica was created in 1999 and has subsidiaries in Belgium, Germany, Switzerland, UK and USA. According to the Spanish company register and an American accounting company, it has a capital of 235,000,000 euros and a turnover of more than 5 billion USD in 2018. In Belgium, a police investigation of Polietica was started on the suspicion of "carousel VAT fraud" as the police believed that Dadak was engaged in transactions between his companies with the intention to avoid paying VAT. The Belgian police believed that Dadak had defrauded Belgium of some €12 million via VAT fraud. Dadak often used a credit card issued by the Rietumu Banka in Riga, Latvia.

In January 2014, Dadak is alleged to have made contact with members of the Sudan People's Liberation Movement-in-Opposition (SPLM-IO) led by Riek Machar to sell them arms. In February 2014, Dadak was briefly arrested in Ibiza after he was alleged to have made death threats via email to a local property manager who he had a dispute with. The charges were dropped after Dadak claimed diplomatic immunity. In May 2014, Dadak is said by the Federal Bureau of Investigation (FBI) to have used a Polietica email address under the false name of Jennifer Forbes to make contact with SPLM-IO rebels fighting in the South Sudanese civil war promising to sell them 40,000 AK-47 Kalashnikov rifles, 30,000 machine guns and thousands of rounds of ammunition. As the European Union had placed an embargo on arms sales to South Sudan in 2011, such sales would be illegal. By contrast, the United States did not impose an arms embargo on South Sudan until 2017, and even then, the embargo on American arms dealers on selling weapons in South Sudan was (and still is) so full of loopholes as to be completely ineffective.

The South Sudanese civil war is one of the world's worse humanitarian disasters with both the government and the rebels frequently committing atrocities against civilians. A report from the United Nations described rape as having "epic proportions" in South Sudan with 70% of the women taking shelter in UN refugee camps reporting that they had been raped since the war began in December 2013 and another three-quarters reporting they had seen someone being raped. Besides for women and children, reports maintained that it is also common for South Sudanese men to be raped by the rampaging militias, though the reluctance of men to admit that they had been raped makes it difficult to place a precise estimate of how common male rape is in South Sudan. The UN's Special Envoy on Sexual Violence, Zainab Bangura, reported she had never seen a nation with worse sexual violence than South Sudan. Besides for the people, the war has had a disastrous impact on the elephant population of South Sudan who have been slaughtered in order to sell their tusks on the black market in Asia and thus earn money to pay for arms. As a consequence, there have been calls for a world-wide arms embargo on South Sudan and the issue has been debated at the UN Security Council.

== Investigated ==
In October 2014, the Spanish police began to investigate Dadak on charges of fraud and tapped his phones. As part of the investigation, the French police shared information from the investigation of the Barresi family with the Spanish police. The investigation was joined by the FBI who in January 2015 informed the Spanish police of their belief that Dadak was selling arms in South Sudan via his American incorporated Polietica company.

In May 2015, the police in Belgium froze a Polietica bank account which they suspected was being used to defraud Belgium of millions of VAT refunds. As a result, Dadak had lost some €1.75 million Euros. The police who were observing Dadak noted in the following months he became notably irascible and began to press his associates for money. In August 2015, a German lawyer who worked for Dadak filed a complaint with the police in Palma de Mallorca after he received a text from Dadak saying he was a "fucking gay German fucker" and threatened to "smash" him if he did not pay him money. Spanish police records state that the same lawyer was beaten by Dadak and his bodyguards in September 2015. Accordingly, to the Spanish police, the wiretaps showed Dadak threatening Gabriel Plaza Herrera, the honorary consul for Guinea-Bissau, demanding he return the €60,000 he paid him for a diplomatic passport, with the tape having Dadak say: "I'm going to kill you. I'm going to tear out your eyes, I'm going to take them out of your face. I'm going to cut your Achilles tendon with a knife. You won't be able to walk anymore".

In one of the tapes, Dadak in a phone call to a Monaco dealer in luxury yachts boasted: "I do the dirty work for governments." In a phone call to a French lawyer, Dadak claimed to own seven warehouses full of weapons for his arms business that were monitored by satellites. Dadak continued to call his former business partner Wegrzyn and in one call said "The merchandise is there and we can act" and spoke about "cars and ammunition". Wegrzyn in an interview denied he discussed business with Dadak in 2014–2016 and when pressed by the media as to what the phone calls were about claimed not to remember.

The wire-tapes also showed that Dadak had a very hedonist lifestyle as he was constantly using drugs and bringing women, especially models, to his Ibiza villa for sex. In one cellphone call, Dadak told a friend: "Yes, because look, I explain, the Russians...[A friend] brought me two Russians home and within two hours they were already [unintelligible] you know? You tell them that you have three private planes, you know how to hook up, brother". Dadak also told his friend to send him photographs of the Russian models he was planning to bring to a party and said: ...send me your information, so I can masturbate a little looking at your photos [of models] on Facebook". By this point, Dadak's relationship with Dirgina had ended and she was no longer living in his villa, but she continued as his business partner. Notably, Dirgina was the only woman he maintained a respectful attitude towards as the wire-tapes showed that Dadak was otherwise dismissive towards women, viewing them as sex objects that existed only for his gratification. The wire-tapes showed that Dadak often threatened his ex-girlfriends as he told one former girlfriend: "I'm going to take a spoon and tear out an eye. I'm going to massacre you. You will piss yourself when you see me". He told another ex-girlfriend she would end up in a "wheelchair" as he was going to "cut" her legs to keep her from walking.

The wire-tapes also showed that Dadak was friends with a Dutch gangster, Salomon "Sanny" Lampie, long resident on Ibiza. Lampie has been charged several times in his native Netherlands with money laundering and he has been convicted of possession of illegal weapons. When a Dutch businessman failed to repay a €4 million debt owed to Dadak, the wire-tapes showed he hired Lampie to send thugs to threaten the son of the businessman in Eindhoven as a way to encourage repayment of the debt.

In February 2016, a police meeting about Dadak was held in Madrid attended by policemen from Spain, Germany, Switzerland, Belgium, and Poland. The Spanish police allege that the Polish police tipped off Dadak that he was under investigation, causing one Spanish policeman to tell journalists: "The leak from the Polish authorities made us stop trusting them. We haven't had much cooperation with them since then." One of Dadak's bodyguards, Marek Sajdak, in a cellphone call to another bodyguard, Roman Romanik, said: "This week I was called by an old acquaintance, a general...Someone has something against [Dadak]". In response to questions about the apparent leak, the Polish police in a statement to the press denied there was a meeting in Madrid, but when confronted with documents showing the meeting did take place, a new statement confirming the meeting was released alongside the declaration that the police had no further comment about the matter. Sajdak was a former BOR agent and he described the leak as a man known only as "Jaro".

== Arrested ==
On 14 July 2016, Dadak was arrested in his Ibiza home. The Spanish police stated his arrest was due to an investigation relating to fraud, money laundering, and of breaking the European Union arms embargo against selling weapons in South Sudan. The government of Guinea-Bissau revoked Dadak's diplomatic passport, ending his diplomatic immunity. The Spanish police struggled with Dadak's bodyguards while he hid for 30 minutes in his villa's panic room. Dadak was arrested in his underwear while attempting to leave his villa via a window. Dadak resisted arrest and had his nose broken by a Spanish policeman. Also arrested were 9 other people, including Dadak's ex-common-law wife, who was charged with money laundering. The others charged were Spanish, Dutch, Ukrainian, Polish and French citizens. In 2016, it was reported that police believe that Dadak had laundered some €15 million into real estate and other property in Spain via a series of shell companies. The group were also accused of engaging in extortion and of making death threats. Documents seized at Dadak's villa were alleged by the police to show that he had been approached by South Sudanese rebels who wanted to buy from him 40,000 AK-47 assault rifles, 30,000 PKM machine guns, and 200,000 boxes of ammunition. Besides for South Sudan, the police seized thousands of emails from Dadak's computer, which reportedly showed that he had been selling arms in dozen of nations across the world. One journalist, Andrew Lusher of The Independent, compared Dadak to the arms dealer villain Richard Roper in the 2016 TV series The Night Manager.

After his arrest, Europol in a press statement stated: "By piecing together information gathered internationally, law enforcement authorities and Europol specialists discovered that the suspect had supplied firearms to several crime networks in Europe. Moreover, investigations showed that he supplied significant amounts of weaponry to an African country, estimated at some 200,000 Kalashnikov AK-47 assault rifles, missile launchers and tanks, via Polish companies he controlled". One journalist, Dominic Johnson of Die Tagezeitung, in a 2016 article based upon police sources alleged that Dadak shipped arms from Poland to The Gambia, and then flew the arms into South Sudan aboard one of the presidential jets belonging to President Yahya Jammeh, who was a close friend of his. The police allege that Dadak purchased weapons on the black market in Eastern Europe; shipped them to The Gambia via his Polietica companies registered in Belgium, Germany, Britain and France; and invested the profits into Spanish real estate while also blackmailing his business partners. Police sources allege that Dadak primarily shipped AK-47 assault rifles, PKM machine guns, ammunition, and rocket launchers to South Sudan, but also claim that on occasions he sold tanks in South Sudan. On the day after Dadak was arrested, police in Switzerland and Germany searched the Polietica offices looking for evidence of gunrunning. At the same time that Dadak was arrested, the Spanish police had arrested several other honorary consuls for Guinea-Bissau on charges on selling Guinea-Bissaun diplomatic passports, and the media speculated at the time that there was a connection between these arrests. Police sources complained that Guinea-Bissau was one of the most corrupt nations in Africa and the practice of selling Guinean-Bissaun diplomatic passports in Europe had become a serious problem. The fact that Dadak enjoyed diplomatic immunity as the "special economic adviser" to the president of Guinea-Bissau and his Ibiza estate was officially classified as a Guinean-Bissaun consulate was cited by the police as one of the abuses associated with Guinean-Bissaun diplomacy. After July 2016, the investigation into Dadak became stymied due to bureaucratic rivalries between different European police forces.

An investigation into Dadak was initiated by the ABW in Rzeszów in August 2016 with several figures from Bumar, Rosevar Holdings and several Polish arms firms being questioned, but the investigation has been criticized as "desultory". Leszek Potentas, the administrator of Rosevar Holdings in Rzeszów told the press: "This investigation [was] leading nowhere. The officer who interrogated me was less than 30 years old". The public prosecutor's office in Rzeszów in a statement declared the investigation into Dadak had been suspended "awaiting an application for international legal assistance from the Spanish side". Dadak's case is the source of controversy in Poland with many asking how a man with associations with both le milieu ("the middle" i.e. French organised crime) and the vory v zakone ("thieves in law" i.e. Russian organised crime) worked as a sales agent for Bumar. At the present, the investigation into gunrunning into South Sudan is being handled by the Spanish National Police Corps, which has been hampered by a lack of evidence. Sources state it is more likely that Dadak will be brought to trial on charges of organized crime, extortion, bribery, and money laundering instead of gunrunning. It has reported that the complicated crime of money laundering is difficult to investigate and even more difficult to assemble enough evidence to bring charges against the suspects with the example the National Crime Agency (NCA) of Britain almost always being stymied in its money laundering investigations. The NCA has resorted to Unexplained Wealth Orders (UWOs) as it is almost impossible for the police to assemble evidence to bring charges against those suspected of money laundering. Carbou told the press that he did not believe that Dadak actually sold arms, saying "I doubt he ever sold one bullet", and called him a swindler who merely played the part of an arms dealer in order to fleece the gullible.

The National Court has archived the investigation against the controversial businessman Pierre Conrad Dadak, based on the island and arrested at his home in Sant Josep in 2016 in the framework of an operation against an organization investigated for money laundering, bribery, threats and drug trafficking. weapons. According to the digital El Confidencial, after seven years of investigations, the Court concludes that the operations they carried out were legal.

On 24 April 2017, the United Nations Panel of Experts on South Sudan in its Final Report regarding gunrunning into South Sudan asked for a world-wide arms embargo on both sides in the South Sudanese civil war and singled out Dadak as one of the arms dealers whose gun-running help the war continue. The panel reported that it had interviewed Dadak in his Spanish jail cell, and stated that Dadak had confirmed that he had been negotiating with the SPLA-IO to sell them arms between January–June 2014. Dadak was alleged to have stated that the SPLA-IO had "approached" him looking to buy weapons rather than the other way around. It remains unclear if the arms were actually delivered to South Sudan or not. In early 2018, it was reported that the National Police Corps as part of the investigation into allegations that Dadak was involved in gunrunning planned to meet four informants from South Sudan who were to confirm that Dadak had delivered 20 containers of weapons to South Sudan. However, the meeting was cancelled after two of the four informants were kidnapped. The fate and whereabouts of the two kidnapped informants remain unknown and the other two informants cancelled the meeting.

In 2017, Yahya Jammeh, the long time dictator of the Gambia was overthrown. The allegations that Jammeh had permitted Dadak to use jetliners belonging to the Gambian state while engaging in his arms business has provoked controversy in the Gambia. Jammeh's private secretary Njogu Bah, who was present at the Jammeh-Dadak meetings, has refused requests for comment from the Gambian media. In December 2017, Dadak was released from pretrial detention on €30,000 bail.

Dadak has not yet to be charged as of 2018 and was released on bail, through forbidden to leave Spain. In 2018, Dadak asked a Spanish court to permission to leave Spain, saying "I am no Pablo Escobar". Before the judge, Dadak denied he was gunrunning into South Sudan and stated: "If I ever bragged, I'm sorry. I've never diverted any ammunition and if I bragged on the phone, it was out of pride. I was wrong but I thought it better to say I was very rich and powerful." About allegations of making death threats, Dadak admitted that he did indeed say and write the things that he was alleged to have done, claiming that he was only "hot-blooded", and maintained that he did not actually want to kill anybody. Dadak claimed he was not an arms dealer, but only a military consultant who claimed to have been employed by the armies of Canada, Switzerland, Thailand, Guinea, Cameroon, Peru, Columbia, and the Gambia.

In an interview, Dadak stated: "I have never sold or even talked about weapons here". On 30 May 2018, Dadak was arrested again in Ibiza on the basis of an extradition request from Germany, alleging he was engaged in drug trafficking and tax evasion. In May 2021, Dadak attracted attention in the Netherlands where he was seen socializing in Spain with the Dutch rapper Jorik Scholten, better known by his stage name Lil' Kleine. In August 2021, Dadak attracted much media attention in France when he was seen in public with the French model and actress Maeva Ghennam. Ghennam posted a photograph of herself with Dadak on her Instragam account, sparking speculation that she was engaged in a relationship with him. The photo has caused much controversy in France.

On 7 September 2021, Dadak was brought to trial on charges of fraud. Dadak had claimed that his Ibiza villa had been robbed in July 2015 and maintained that he had lost two insured watches, a Rolex Daytona worth 26 thousand euros and an Audemars Piguet worth 23 thousand euros, both of which the insurance company had paid out for. The prosecutor for Ibiza claimed that both the stolen watches were found inside Dadak's villa when he was arrested in July 2016, making him guilty of insurance fraud. In France, Dadak has become known as a chef de guerre ("chief of war").

Andrew Feinstein, the South African author of The Shadow World: Inside the Global Arms Trade and an expert on global corruption stated in an interview: "Dadak's story reflects the complete amoral nature of the arms trade. The distinction between arms dealers and grifters is extremely fuzzy. A lot of these people are almost caricatures, they have huge personalities, they're delusional. The extraordinary thing is how company after company, government after government, actually fall for these people. And the reason they do it is because everything that happens in this trade is secret, so it provides absolutely fertile ground for these sorts of conmen".

In mid-June 2023 Dadak was arrested in a joint operation by the FBI and the National Police Corps (Spain) at the Barcelona - El Prat Airport upon arrival from Dubai. When Dadak presented his diplomatic passport issued by Guinea-Bissau he was immediately placed under arrest. In an official press release, the Spanish Ministry of Interior describes Dadak as a dangerous fugitive who was wanted by the Interpol. Dadak was wanted for fraud, identity theft, and money laundering.

Dadak is alleged to have been the main architect in an elaborate scheme where dozens of people were defrauded around the world. It is alleged that Dadak claimed to be a representative for the famous British Harrods department store, hence the name for the operation: Operación Harrods. The exact details of the fraud are currently not known. Based on the official press release, the evidence against Dadak is at least partially derived from money transactions. Dadak allegedly controlled the account where the defrauded funds were first received and from where they were further diverted to accounts based in Belgium, Canada, the Czech Republic, France, Germany, Latvia, Monaco, Poland, Spain, the Arab Emirates, the United States, and Vietnam. After Dadak's arrest, his villa in Ibiza was searched. Dadak was held in custody for the entire time and extradited to the USA in March 2025.

== Extradition and subsequent detention ==
Despite his resistance, Dadak was extradited from Madrid in a highly secretive operation to New York on March 13, 2025.

According to an unsealed indictment (USA v. Dadak, 1:23-cr-125) Dadak was charged by the United States Attorney for the Southern District of New York for wire fraud (pretending to represent a luxury brand and stealing), aggravated identity theft, extortion and transactions involving a diamond-encrusted watch and a luxury vehicle. Further investigations against Dadak are ongoing and a superseding indictment will likely follow.

On April 4 based on a plea deal Dadak plead guilty to a single count of Wire Fraud. Sentencing was set for July 9 at 11:30 am.

According to the Bureau of Prisons website, Dadak was issued prisoner's Register Number: 66699-511, and is currently not in BOP custody.

== Sentence ==
On July 9, 2025 Dadak was sentenced in New York to 36 months in federal custody, with no supervised release. Dadak was also ordered to pay a special assessment fee of $100, and to forfeit $1,050,515.19. Dadak's detention was continued. Due to his arrest in mid-June 2023 he will be released in mid-June 2026.

== Lawsuit in Delaware ==
A lawsuit was filed on August 4, 2025 in Delaware Court of Chancery seeking a declaration of sole member of a Delaware-chartered company. According to the filing, Dadak "fraudulently made, caused to be made, filed, or caused to be filed, false records” seizing control of an enterprise over which he never exercised any legitimate authority".

== Legal activities ==
The National Court has closed the investigation against controversial businessman Pierre Konrad Dadak, who was based on the island and arrested at his home in Sant Josep in 2016 as part of an operation against an organization being investigated for money laundering, bribery, threats, attempted murder, drug trafficking, and weapons trafficking. According to the digital news outlet El Confidencial, after seven years of investigation, the Court has concluded that the operations carried out were legal.

The businessman was arrested in a police macro-operation that was deployed in various parts of the island, with the main focus on the villa where Dadak was arrested, in Caló d'en Real, Sant Josep. More than fifty troops participated in the operation, which was carried out by the National Police Corps.

The investigation began in October 2014 after a complaint by the Prosecutor's Office before the National Court, according to the digital newspaper.
