= Africans in Poland =

Racial minority group in Poland

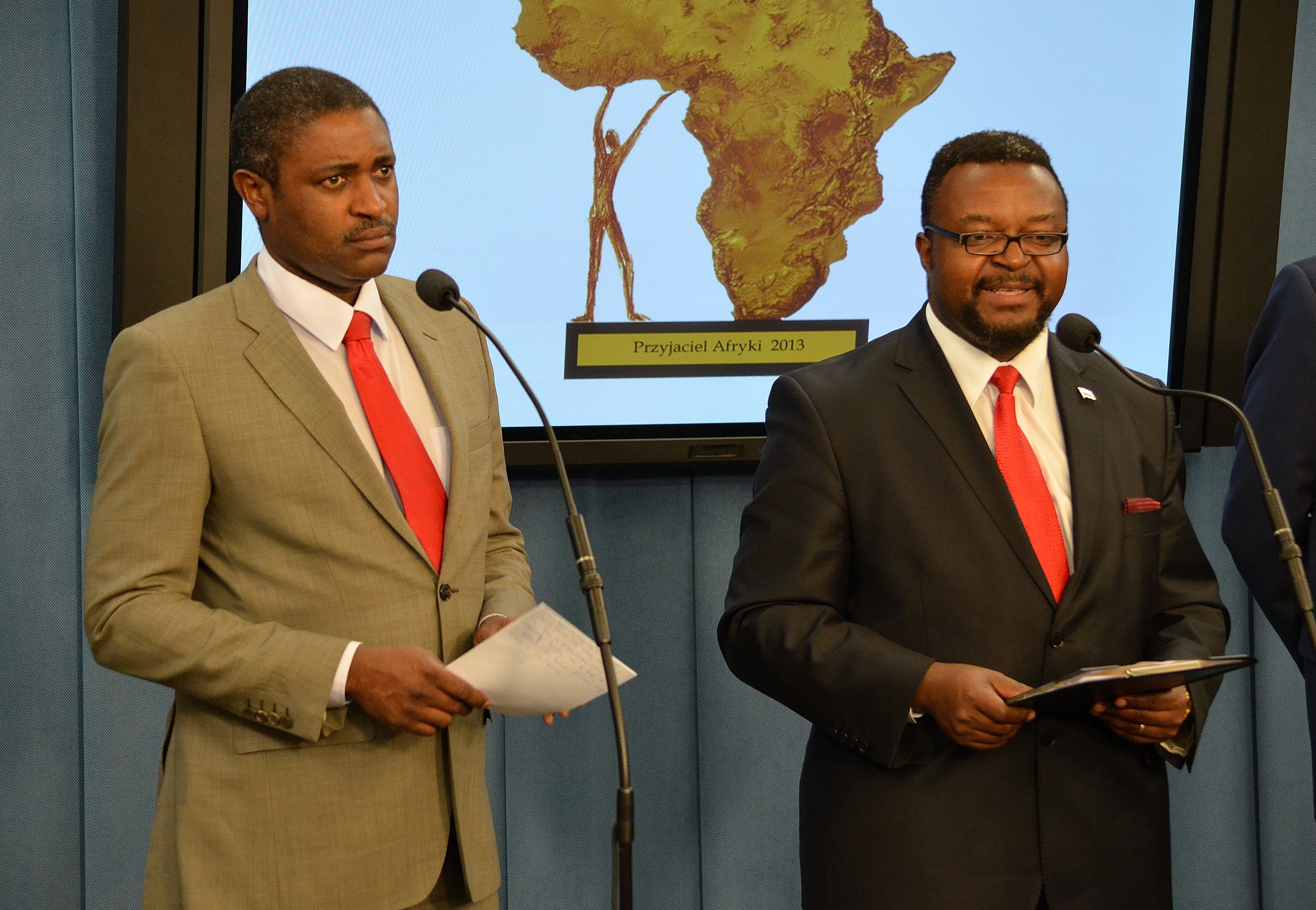
- Members of Sejm, Killion Munyama and John Godson, 2013

Languages
- Polish, English, French, others

Religion
- Islam, Roman Catholicism, Atheism, others

Africans in Poland, also known as Afro-Poles or Afro-Polish (Polish: Afropolacy), are citizens or residents of Poland who have any ancestry from any of the Black racial groups of Africa.

== History ==
The first people of African descent to arrive on Polish soil were brought as servants to Polish kings and nobles. Among others, John III Sobieski, Augustus II the Strong and Stanisław August Poniatowski had black servants. In the first half of the 17th century a black servant named Aleksander Dynis was in the service of the Bishop of Krakow. In 1752, Hieronim Florian Radziwiłł from Biała Podlaska purchased 12 slaves in London, black servants were also in the service of Jerzy Ignacy Lubomirski in Przemyśl, and Elżbieta Izabela Lubomirska in Mokotów (today part of Warsaw). A black adjutant and butler, Jean Lapierre, was in the service of Tadeusz Kościuszko.

However, the origins of the current Afro-Polish community are rooted in educational immigration to the Polish People's Republic. The Communist government strongly supported anti-colonial movements in Africa as part of broader Soviet policy. From the 1950s to the 1980s, many Africans emigrated to Poland to pursue their educations. While most African students in Poland returned to their countries of origin, many decided to remain in Poland and acquire citizenship. The contemporary Afro-Polish community includes many of these Africans and their descendants.

In 1955, the 5th World Festival of Youth and Students was held in Warsaw. Organized by the leftist, anti-imperialist World Federation of Democratic Youth, the festival invited thousands of delegates from around the world, including almost 1,000 Africans. The Communist leadership of Poland wished to express solidarity and promote socialism to Africans from colonized nations. This was one of the earliest Polish encounters with non-white people, following the end of the multicultural and multiethnic Second Polish Republic following World War II. The Polish Press Agency was given the task of documenting the African visitors, which began an ongoing series of Polish press photography depicting African visitors and residents of Poland.

== Notable Afro-Polish citizens or residents ==
=== Historical ===
- Jean Lapierre, Haitian-born (probably) adjutant and butler to Tadeusz Kościuszko
- Władysław Franciszek Jabłonowski (1769–1802), Polish-born Napoleonic General of English and African descent
- Eduard von Feuchtersleben (1798–1857), Kraków-born (then in the Austrian Partition of Poland) engineer and writer, whose mother was a daughter of African-born Angelo Soliman

=== Entertainment and media ===
- Emilia Dankwa - Polish-born actress of Ghanaian descent
- Mamadou Diouf – Senegalese-born musician
- Sara James – Polish-born singer of Nigerian descent
- Patricia Kazadi – Polish-born actress of Congolese descent
- Paulina Mabiala-Czarkowska - Polish-born television personality of Congolese descent
- Omenaa Mensah – Polish-born TV presenter of Ghanaian descent
- Natalia Muianga - Polish-born singer of Mozambique descent
- Izabela Perez - Polish-born actress of Afro-Cuban descent
- Omar Sangare – Polish-American actor, academic, poet, and theatre director
- Patrycja Soliman - Actress, Egyptian father
- Aleksandra Szwed – Polish-born actress of Nigerian descent
- Ifi Ude – Nigerian-born singer
- Daniel Godson- Nigerian Polish musician who won the Opole Music festival for debiuts

=== Political and social activists ===
- John Godson – Nigerian-born Polish People's Party former member of the Sejm, first black and first African to be elected in the Polish Parliament.
- Killion Munyama – Zambian-born Civic Platform former member of the Sejm
- Krystian Legierski - LGBT activist, of Polish and Mauritanian descent

=== Sportsmen ===
- Babatunde Aiyegbusi – Polish-born professional wrestler of Nigerian descent
- Michael Ameyaw - Footballer of Ghanaian descent
- Ishmael Baidoo - Ghanaian footballer
- Ferdinand Chi Fon - Cameroon-born retired footballer
- Martins Ekwueme - Nigerian footballer
- Sofia Ennaoui - Athlete, Moroccan father
- Kelechi Iheanacho - Nigerian footballer
- Benjamin Imeh - Nigerian footballer
- Maxwell Kalu - Nigerian footballer
- Thomas Kelati - Basketball player of Eritrean heritage
- Jordan Loyd - American-born naturalized Polish basketball player
- Tafara Madembo - Footballer of Zimbabwean descent
- Alain Ngamayama - Footballer of Congolese descent
- Emmanuel Olisadebe - Nigerian-born footballer
- Natalia Padilla - Footballer of Moroccan descent
- Artur Partyka - Former high jumper, Algerian father
- Yared Shegumo – Ethiopian-born distance runner, who specializes in the Marathon
- A. J. Slaughter - American-born naturalized Polish basketball player
- Jeremy Sochan - Polish-American basketball player
- Mouhamadou Traoré - Senegalese footballer
- Stanley Udenkwor - Former footballer of Nigerian descent
- Izuagbe Ugonoh – Polish-born boxer of Nigerian descent

=== Other ===
- August Agbola O'Browne - Jazz drummer, who is believed to be a World War II Polish resistance member
- Abdulcadir Gabeire Farah – Somalian-born historian and social activist.
- Maxwell Itoya – Nigerian immigrant in Poland, who was killed in a police raid on a flea market.
- Robert Mitwerandu - Late footballer of Zimbabwean descent
- Simon Mol - Cameroonian anti-racism activist arrested for knowingly spreading HIV virus

== See also ==
- Media related to African diaspora in Poland at Wikimedia Commons
- Racism in Poland § Africans
- African immigration to Europe
