= Imeh =

Imeh is a surname. Notable people with the surname include:

- Ikpe Umoh Imeh (1906–2004), Nigerian politician
- Benjamin Imeh (born 1982), Nigerian footballer
