= Białystok Equality March =

Event in Poland

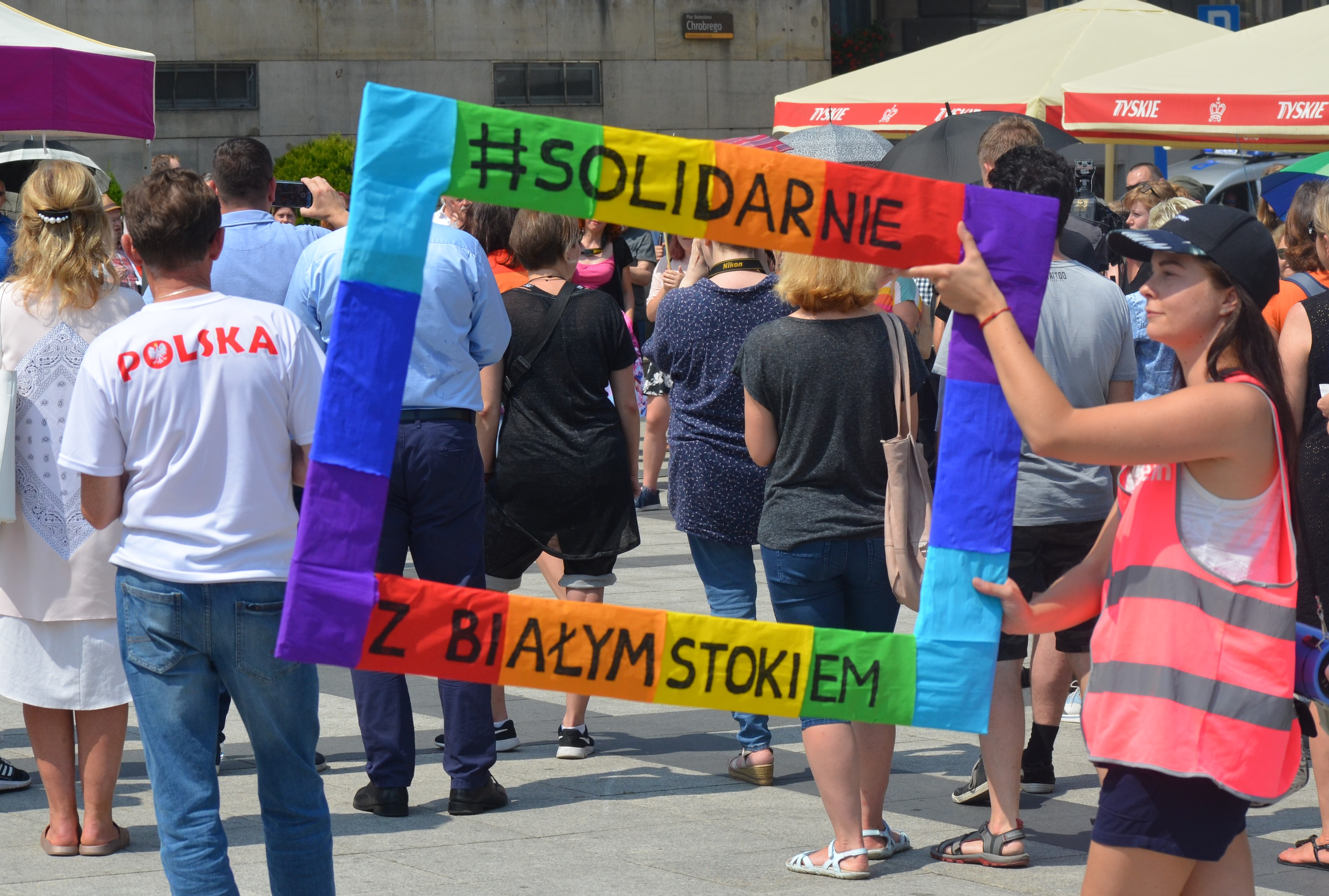
Poland against Violence, Solidarity with Białystok demonstration

The first Bialystok equality march took place on 20 July 2019 in Białystok. Approximately a thousand pride marchers were opposed by thousands of members of far-right groups, ultra football fans, and others who violently attacked the marchers. Following the attack, solidarity events were held in Poland.

== Background ==
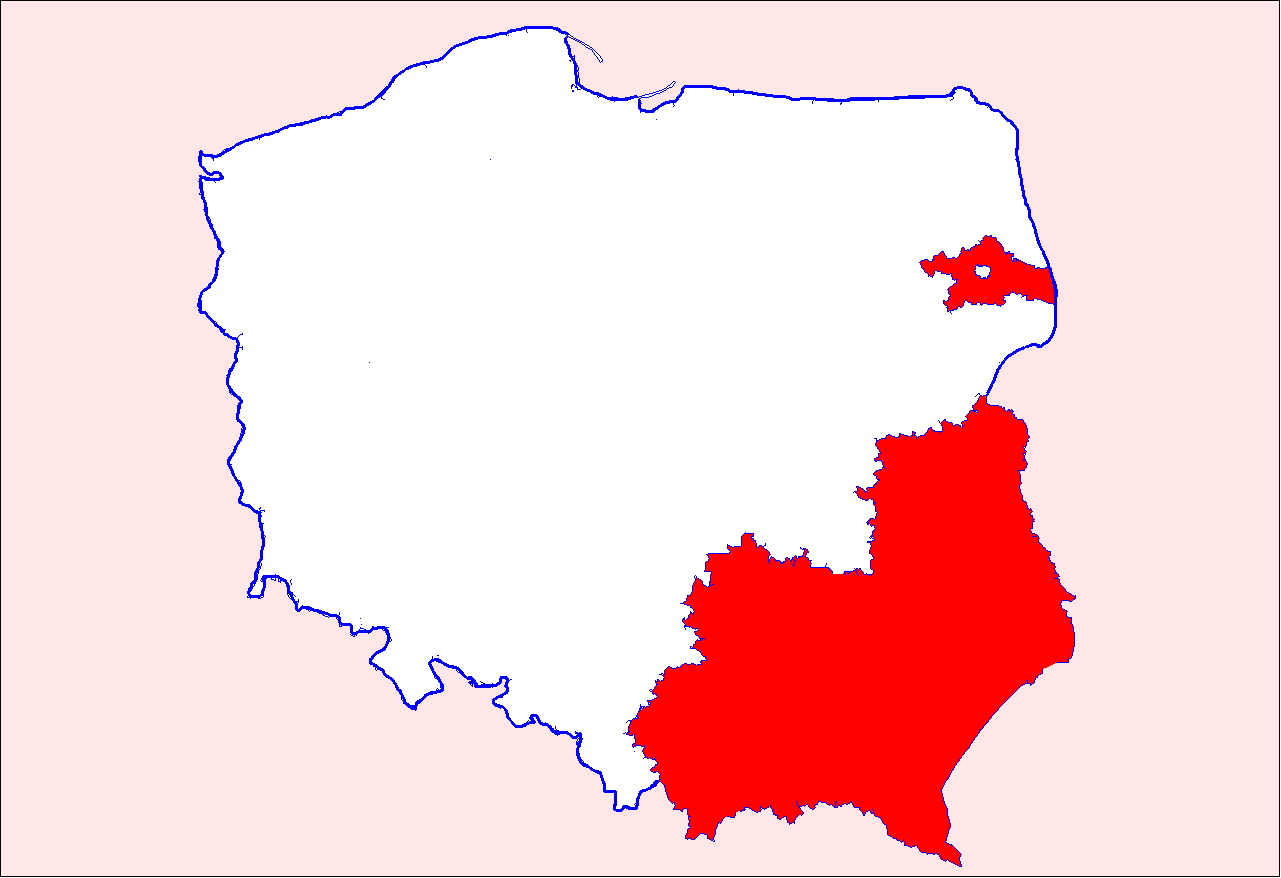
Map of Poland, LGBT-free zones declared (as of July 2019) on a Voivodeship or Powiat level marked in red.

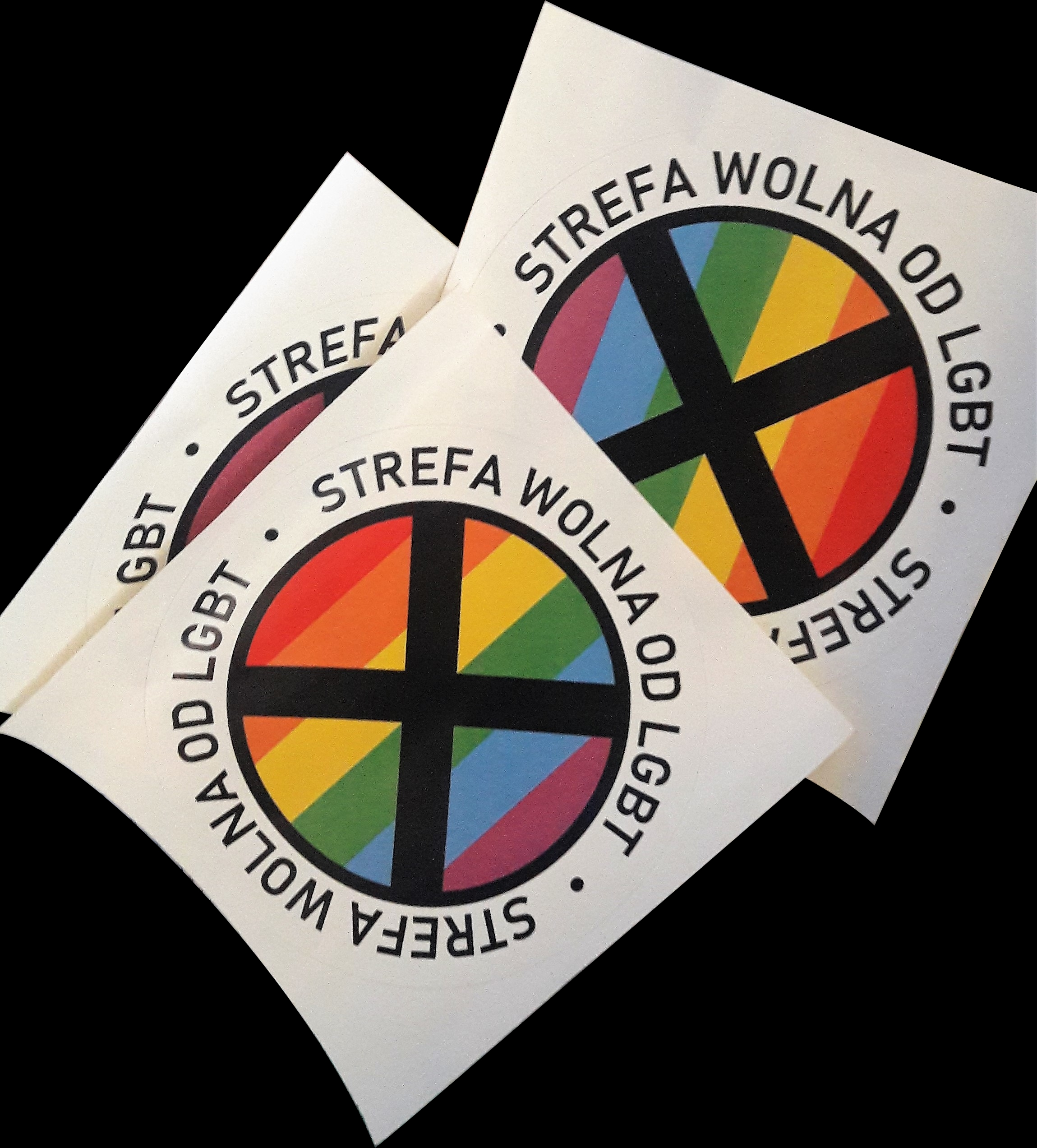
LGBT-free zone stickers distributed by the Gazeta Polska newspaper

Białystok is located in Podlaskie Voivodeship which is regarded as the bible belt of Poland and is a stronghold of the party Law and Justice (PiS). The surrounding Białystok County had been declared an LGBT-free zone in 2019, as have other regions in Poland. However, the mayor of Białystok Tadeusz Truskolaski is a political independent with more tolerant views.

In February 2019 Warsaw Mayor signed a declaration supporting LGBTQ rights and pledging to integrate sexual education in schools following World Health Organization guidelines. The Warsaw declaration enraged conservatives and was a rallying cry in conservative politics and media. While in the run-up to the 2015 Polish parliamentary election PiS engaged in anti-Muslim rhetoric, in the months prior to 2019 Polish parliamentary election PiS focused on LGBT right. PiS leader Jarosław Kaczyński saying LGBT "ideology" was imported to Poland from abroad, a threat to the Polish identity and nation.

Many Catholic Church in Poland figures have spoken against LGBT rights in Poland. In response to speeches opposed to the movement for acceptance and civil rights for gender and sexual minorities, made by the Church and PiS, some 24 pride marches were scheduled for 2019 in Poland.

On 7 July 2019, Archbishop Tadeusz Wojda issued a proclamation to be read in all churches in Białystok and the entire Podlaskie Voivodeship. He evoked the memory of Poland's struggle against Communism with the Latin phrase non possumus (roughly, "we can not allow"), which Polish Cardinal Stefan Wyszyński used in an historic protest that led to his arrest in 1953. He wrote that pride marches were "blasphemy against God", and described the march as set up "by a foreign initiative in Podlaskie land and community, an area which is deeply rooted in Christianity and concerned about the good of its own society, especially children". Unlike right-wing and centrist mayors elsewhere in Poland, who had attempted to ban pride marches, Białystok's mayor allowed the march to take place in the face of widespread criticism from PiS officials.

According to Rafał Pankowski of "Never Again" Association, the Białystok region is strong associated with the far-right: "Many of the acts of xenophobic aggression have been committed in Podlaskie compared to other regions in Poland".

According to the police, 32 demonstrations were registered for the day of the march mostly in opposition to it. counter-demonstrations included a prayer vigil at Cathedral Basilica of the Assumption of the Blessed Virgin Mary, Białystok and an adjoining picnic at Branicki Palace, Białystok that was organized by Podlaskie marshal Artur Kosicki that included a display by an army regiment, folk musicians, and inflatable castles.

Prior to the march, leaflets were distributed in the city stating it would be "contaminated with LGBT bacteria". The Gazeta Polska newspaper announced plans to distribute LGBT-free zone stickers along with the newspaper.

== March ==
According to Jacek Dehnel, he was supposed to make a speech at the opening of the march at a square on Skłodowska Street, however as marchers were faced with violence even prior to the official start of the march and the riot atmosphere prevented this.

Approximately 800 to 1,000 pride marchers were opposed by thousands of members of far-right groups, ultra football fans, and others who threw rocks, bottles, and firecrackers at the marchers. Police estimated some 4,000 counter protesters were involved. Counter-protesters shouted "Bialystok free of perverts" and "God, honor and fatherland", and objects were hurled at marchers from housing blocks along the route. The marchers shouted "Poland free of fascists" as they marched some 3 kilometers in the city center.

At around 5 in the evening the march ended, following the dispersal of far-right protesters by police who used pepper spray and stun grenades. To avoid being attacked as they left the march, some marchers hid LGBT flags and removed their makeup, in an effort to avoid standing out.

More than 30 people were arrested for attacking police or the pride marchers.

Dozens of marchers were injured. Amnesty International criticized the police response, saying they had failed to protect marchers and "failed to respond to instances of violence".

== Aftermath ==
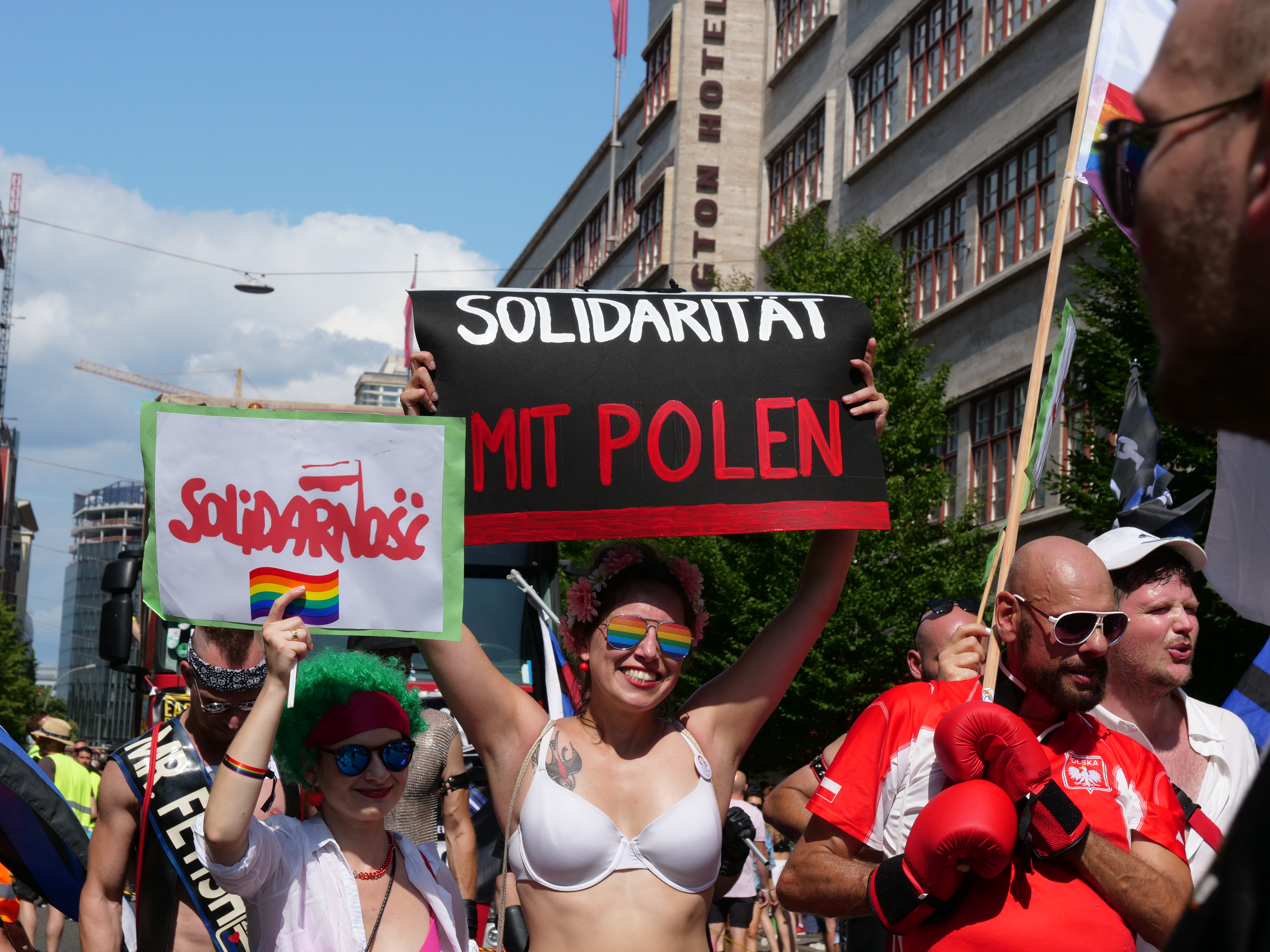
Marchers in 2019 Christopher Street Day 2019 march holding up Solidarity signs with Poland, following Białystok attack

According to the New York Times, similar to the manner in which the Unite the Right rally in Charlottesville shocked Americans, the violence in Białystok raised public concern among some in Poland over opposition to the homosexual agenda and gender ideology. While the Polish government has condemned the violence at the march, it has also hinted that LGBTQ activists were attempting a provocation. In late July the Ministry of Interior said they had identified 104 people who broke the law in the march, and carried out enforcement action towards 77.

Michael Roth, the German Minister of State for Europe, condemned the attack and stated that he brings up gay rights in every discussion with his Polish counterparts.

Thousands took to the streets in Warsaw to protest the violence in Białystok. A demonstration for tolerance was held in Gdańsk on 23 July 2019, with the slogan "zone free of zones" (Polish: Strefa wolna od stref). In Szczecin a demonstration under the slogan of "hate-free zone" (Polish: Strefa wolna od nienawiści) took place, and in Łódź left-wing politicians handed out "hate-free zone" stickers. A week after the events, left-wing parties held a protest in Białystok against the violence at the march. In the July 2019 Berlin Pride, marchers organized by Die Linke carried signs in solidarity with Białystok. One marcher carried a banner of the Rainbow Madonna, in solidarity with Elżbieta Podleśna who was arrested in May 2019 for putting up signs of the Madonna.

Archbishop Tadeusz Wojda, two days after the event, condemned the violence in a brief statement as incompatible with Christianity but also urged believes to pray for "the family and its internal purity".

The Polish Sieci magazine ran a cover story titled "A massive attack on Poland is approaching" in which they blamed the attack on the liberal opposition, saying they were trying to discredit the government.

LGBT campaigners stated that PiS and the Church created a radicalised atmosphere, saying the government incited a "pogrom mood" towards gays.

Responding to the attacks on the Polish LGBT community, the global All Out LGBT+-rights group launched a campaign in Poland. All Out's Director of Programs Mathias Wasik stated: "More recently, we’ve been particularly worried about the escalation of attacks on LGBT+ people in Poland. Right-wing politicians and representatives of the Catholic church have been using the issue for their own political agenda. And their divisive words are being followed up by hateful actions, as we’ve seen during the attacks on the pride march in Białystok".

== See also ==
- LGBT rights in Poland
