= Racism in Poland =

Racism in Poland has been a subject of extensive studies. Ethnic minorities historically made up a substantial proportion of Poland's population, from the founding of the Polish state through the Second Polish Republic, than they did after World War II when government statistics showed that at least 94% of the population self-reported as ethnic Poles.

== Racism towards ethnic minorities ==
As per the OSCE Office for Democratic Institutions and Human Rights (ODIHR), hate crimes recorded by the Police of Poland dropped between 2018 and 2020, but rose steadily until 2022, reaching a level higher than 2018 (table below). Of the 440 prosecuted hate crimes, 268 (61%) were racist and xenophobic hate crimes, seconded by 87 (20%) antisemitic hate crimes, while only 6% were "anti-Muslim" hate crimes (25).

Year	Hate crimes recorded by police	Prosecuted	Sentenced
2022	1,180	440	312
2021	997	466	339
2020	826	374	266
2019	972	432	597
2018	1,117	397	315

=== Jews ===
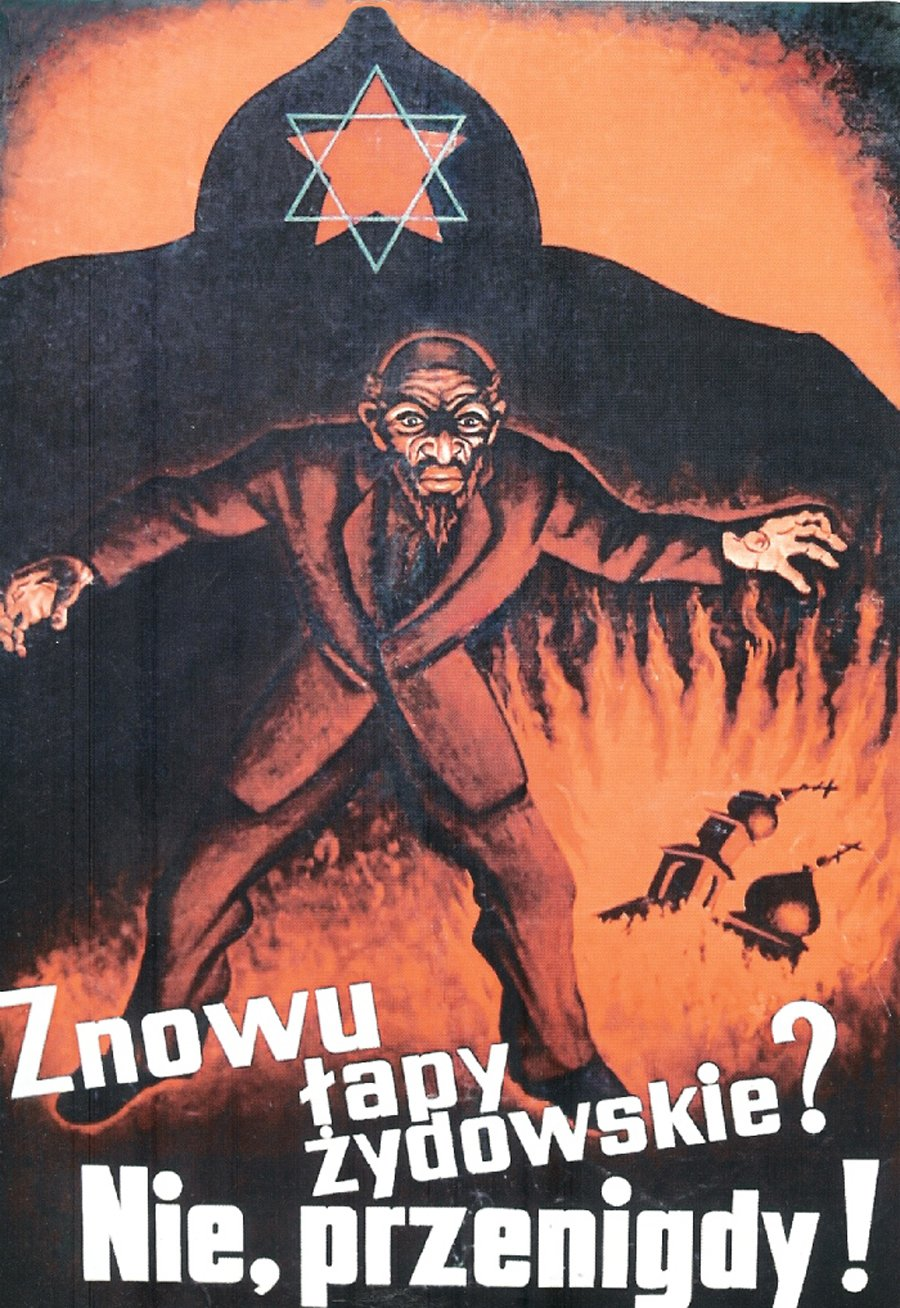
Antisemitic poster dated to the Polish–Soviet War of 1919–1921.

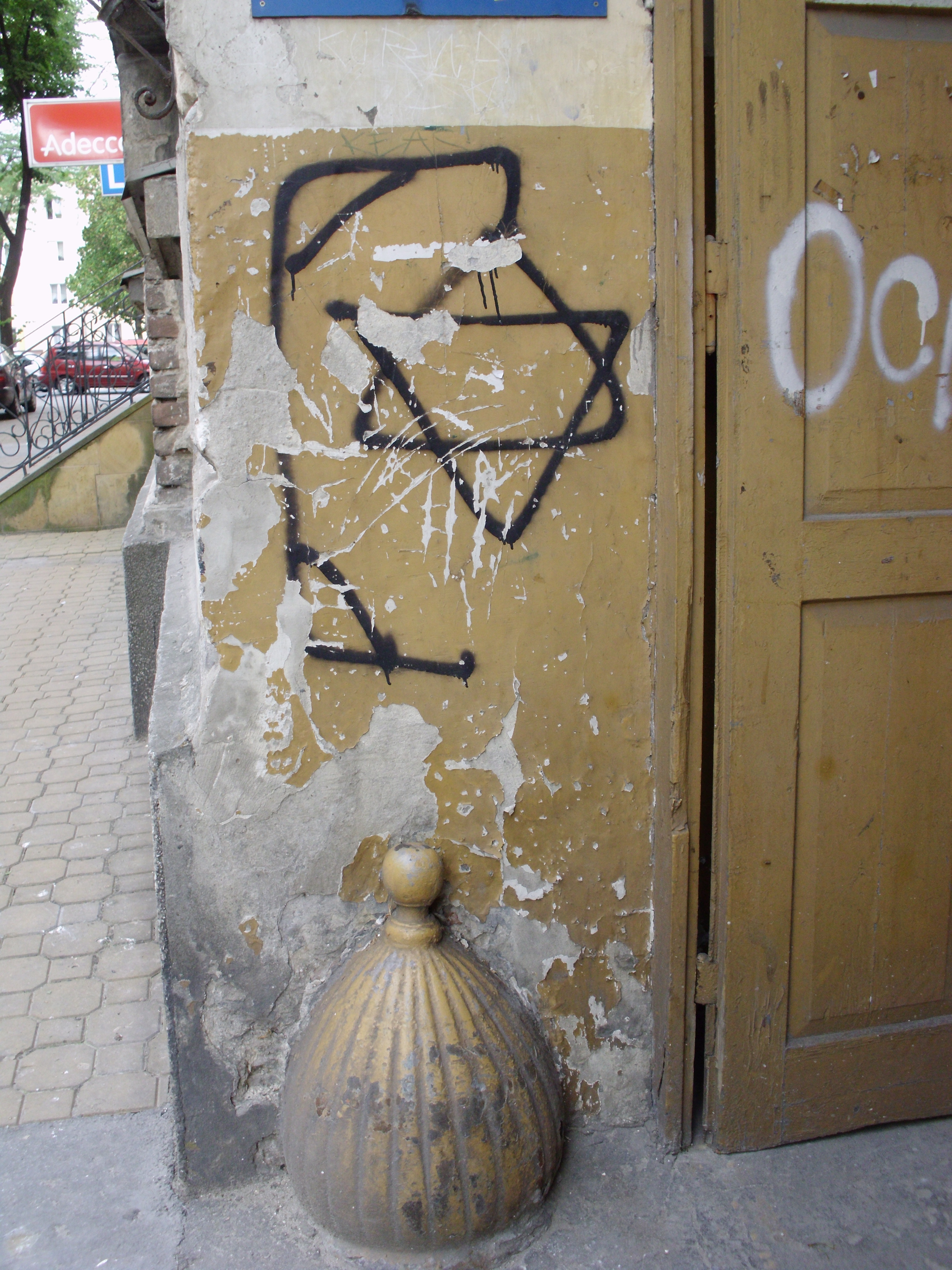
Antisemitic graffiti in Lublin depicting a Star of David hanging from gallows, c. 2012.

King Casimir III the Great brought Jews to Poland during the Black Death when Jewish communities were persecuted and expelled from several European kingdoms. With better living conditions, 80% of world Jewry lived in Poland by the mid-16th century. During the 15th century in the royal capital of Kraków, extremist clergymen advocated violence against the Jews, who gradually lost their positions. In 1469, Jews were expelled from their old settlement and forced to move to Spiglarska Street. In 1485, Jewish elders were forced to renounce trade in Kraków, leading many Jews to leave for Kazimierz which did not fall under the restrictions due to its status as a royal town. Following the 1494 fire in Kraków, a wave of anti-Jewish attacks occurred. King John I Albert forced the remaining Jews of Kraków to move to Kazimierz. Starting in 1527, Jews were no longer admitted into the city walls of Warsaw (generally speaking, temporary stays were possible in the royal palace). Only the Praga suburb was open to them.

The Council of Four Lands created in 1581 was a Jewish diet presided over by community elders from each major part of Poland, while another governing body was established in Lithuania in 1623. Jewish communities were usually protected by the szlachta (nobles) in exchange for managing the nobles' domains. In Congress Poland, Jews gained civic rights with the ukase (edict) of 5 June 1862, two years before serfdom was abolished. 35 years later, the 1.4 million Polish Jews represented 14% of whom within the Russian-administered partition, which included Warsaw and Łódź.

In the Second Polish Republic, the Polish government excluded Jews from receiving government bank credits, from public sector employment (in 1931, only 599 of 87,640 public servants were Jewish—in the fields of telephony, railroads, administration and justice), and from obtaining business licenses in government-controlled spheres of the economy. From the 1930s, limits were placed on Jewish enrollment in universities, admission to the medical and legal professions, on Jewish shops, Jewish export firms, Shechita, membership in business associations etc. 25% of students were Jews in 1921–1922, the proportion had dropped to 8% by 1939, while the far-right National Democracy (Endecja) party organized anti-Jewish boycotts.

Following the death of Poland's prime minister Józef Piłsudski in 1935, the Endecja intensified its efforts and declared in 1937 that its "main aim and duty must be to remove the Jews from all spheres of social, economic, and cultural life in Poland", which lead to violence in a few cases (pogroms in smaller towns). In response, the government organized the Camp of National Unity (OZON) to take over the Polish parliament in 1938, which went on to draft anti-Jewish legislations similar to those in Nazi Germany, Hungary, Romania etc. The OZON advocated the mass emigration of Jews from Poland, boycotts of Jews, numerus clausus and further restrictions on Jewish rights. According to Timothy Snyder, in the years leading up to World War II the Polish leadership

wanted to be rid of most Polish Jews [...but] in simple logistical terms the idea [...] seemed to make no sense. How could Poland arrange a deportation of millions of Jews while the country was mobilized for war? Should the tens of thousands of Jewish officers and soldiers be pulled from the ranks of the Polish army?"

During WWII, notable antisemitic incidents in Poland included the 1941 Jedwabne pogrom under brutal Nazi occupation and brief postwar anti-Jewish violence, attributed by historians to lawlessness and anti-communist resistance against the Soviet occupation with which the Żydokomuna (Jewish communism) label was associated. Another major event took place during the 1968 Polish political crisis. Jews in Poland made up 10% of the country's population in 1939, who were all but eradicated in the Holocaust. In the Polish census of 2011, merely 7,353 people declared either their primary or secondary ethnicity as Jewish. In 2017, the University of Warsaw's Center for Research on Prejudice found an increase in antisemitic views in Poland, possibly due to growing anti-migrant sentiment and alleged Islamophobia in Poland. Later that year, the European Jewish Congress accused the Polish government of "normalizing" the phenomenon in the country.

In 2022, the American civil rights group Anti-Defamation League (ADL) conducted a global survey on antisemitism. It found that 35% of Poland's people "harbour[ed] antisemitic attitudes", the second highest among the 10 European countries surveyed. Notably, the percentage was significantly lower than the previous ADL survey. Whereas, the Czulent Jewish Association, a Polish Jewish group, reported in 2023 that 488 antisemitic incidents had been recorded in 2022, 86% of which involved online harassment and insults. It noted that "Jew" was often used to smear a perceived enemy as "disloyal, an outsider and unpatriotic." Comments peddling antisemitic tropes and blaming all Jews for the Gaza war are also reportedly common in Reddit's subreddit r/Poland, subject to no apparent administrative interventions despite blatant violations.

In June 2023, Polish-Canadian historian Jan Grabowski held a seminar on Poland's history of antisemitism in Warsaw. Far-right MP Grzegorz Braun and his backers forced its cancellation by smashing Grabowski's microphone. During the 2023 Hanukkah, the same MP put out a menorah with a fire extinguisher in the Polish parliament. He was expelled by the parliament and charged with hate crimes. His behavior caused a global uproar, while being praised by a pro-Palestinian multitude in Reddit's subreddit r/Poland. Nevertheless, Grzegorz Braun was elected to the European Parliament in June 2024.

On 1 May 2024, the Nożyk Synagogue in Warsaw was hit with three firebombs by a 16-year old. Poland's President Andrzej Duda condemned the firebombing, "There is no place for antisemitism in Poland! There is no place for hatred in Poland!" It happened amid a global spike in antisemitic hate crimes from the Gaza War.

=== Roma ===
In June 1991, the Mława riot, a series of violent incidents against Polska Roma, broke out after a Romani teenager drove into three ethnic Poles in a crosswalk, killing one Polish man and permanently injuring another, before fleeing the scene of the accident. After the accident, a rioting mob attacked wealthy Romani settlements in the Polish town of Mława. Both the Mława police chief and University of Warsaw sociology researchers said that the pogrom was primarily due to class envy (some Romani have grown wealthy in the gold and automobile trades). At the time, the mayor of the town, as well as the Romani involved and other residents, said the incident was primarily racially motivated.

During coverage of the riot, an emerging change in stereotypes about Roma in Poland was identified. Roma were no longer poor, dirty, or cheerful, and did not beg or pretend to be lowly anymore. Instead, they were seen as owning high-end cars, living in fancy mansions, flaunting their wealth while bragging that local authorities and police are on their payroll, leaving them unafraid of anyone. At the same time, they were seen as swindlers, thieves, hustlers, and military service dodgers who refused to hold down legal, decent jobs. Negative "metastereotypes" – or the Romas' own perceptions of stereotypes that dominant groups hold about their group – were described by the Polish Roma Society in an attempt to heighten the awareness of and dialogue around exclusionism.

=== Ukrainians ===
During the second half of the last millennium, Poland experienced significant periods when its feudal economy was dominated by serfdom. Many serfs were treated in disdainful fashion by the nobility (szlachta) and had few rights. While many serfs were ethnic, Catholic Poles, many others were Orthodox Ruthenians, later self-identifying as Ukrainians and Belarusians. Some scholars described the attitudes of the (mostly Polish) nobility towards serfs as a form of racism. In modern Poland, where Ukrainians form a significant minority of migrant workers, they are subject to occasional racism in everyday life.

=== Africans ===
The most common word in Polish for a black person has traditionally been "Murzyn". It is often regarded as a neutral word to describe a person of black (Sub-Saharan African) ancestry, but nowadays many Africans in Poland consider it pejorative, with dictionaries reflecting this. Professor Marek Łaziński has said that "Murzyn" is now "archaic". Perceptions of black people have also been shaped by literature. Henryk Sienkiewicz’s novel In Desert and Wilderness contains the famous character Kali, who speaks broken English and has dubious morality. In 1924, poet Julian Tuwim published a children's verse, "Murzynek Bambo" ("The little Murzyn Bambo"), which remained much-loved over the following half-century, but in the 21st century became criticised for "othering" black people. In Communist Poland, Uncle Tom's Cabin, by Harriet Beecher Stowe was translated quite freely and targeted at children because it was seen as anti-capitalist and anti-slavery, but now is seen as reinforcing various black stereotypes.

One high-profile event with regard to blacks in Poland was the death of Maxwell Itoya in 2010, a Nigerian street vendor from a mixed marriage who was selling counterfeit goods. He was shot in the upper leg by a police officer during a street brawl that followed a screening check at a market in Warsaw, and died of a severed artery. The event led to a media debate regarding policing and racism. In Strzelce Opolskie, black football players from the LZS Piotrówka club were attacked in a bar by fans of opposing team Odra Opole in 2015 and two young men were arrested. At least six were sentenced. In a Łódź dance club, a black student was attacked in a men's washroom.

== Racism against ethnic Poles ==
Though Poles have generally constituted a majority of Poland's population, there were times, particularly during the partitions of Poland (mid-18th century to 1918), when most Polish territories were under control of other nations, and Poles, effectively minorities in the nationalistic German Empire and Russian Empire, were subject to discrimination and racism.

=== German Empire ===
Racist publications about Poles appeared as early as the 18th century and were imbued with Medieval ethnic stereotypes and racist overtones in order to justify German rule over Polish territories. Authors such as Georg Forster wrote that Poles were "cattle in human form". When part of Poland was under German rule, the Poles were subject to racist policies. These policies gained popularity among German nationalists, some of whom belonged to the Völkisch movement, resulting in the expulsion of Poles by Germany. This was fueled by Anti-Polish sentiment, especially during the age of partitions in the 18th century. The Kulturkampf campaign led by Otto von Bismarck resulted in a legacy of anti-Polish racism; the Polish population experienced oppression and exploitation at the hands of Germans. The racist ideas of the Prussian state directed against Polish people were adopted by German social scientists, led in part by Max Weber.

=== Nazi Germany ===
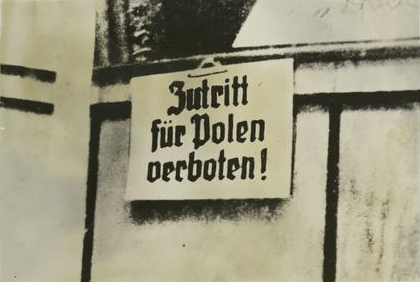
German warning in Nazi-occupied Poland 1939 - "No entrance for Poles!"

Concentration camp badge with the letter "P" to identify people of Polish ethnicity, which Polish slave laborers and inmates were required to wear in occupied Poland during World War II

During World War II Poland was occupied by Nazi Germany and the Soviet Union and Polish people were harshly discriminated against in their own country. In directive No. 1306, issued by Reich Ministry of Public Enlightenment and Propaganda on 24 October 1939, the concept of untermenschen (subhuman) is cited in reference to Polish ethnicity and culture:

It must become clear to everybody in Germany, even to the last milkmaid, that Polishness is equal to subhumanity. Poles, Jews and Gypsies are on the same inferior level. This must be clearly outlined [...] until every citizen of Germany has it encoded in his subconsciousness that every Pole, whether a farm worker or intellectual, should be treated like vermin".

Most Nazis considered the Poles, like the majority of other Slavs, to be non-Aryan and non-European "masses from the East" which should be either totally annihilated along with the Jews and Gypsies, or entirely expelled from the European continent. Poles were the victims of Nazi crimes against humanity and some of the main non-Jewish victims of the Holocaust. Approximately 2.7 million ethnic Poles were murdered or killed during World War II.

Nazi policy towards ethnically Polish people eventually became the genocide and destruction of the entire Polish nation, as well as cultural genocide which involved Germanisation and the suppression or murder of the religious, cultural, intellectual, and political leadership.

On March 15, 1940, Heinrich Himmler stated that "All Polish specialists will be exploited in our military-industrial complex. Later, all Poles will disappear from this world. It is imperative that the great German nation considers the elimination of all Polish people as its chief task." The goal of the policy was to prevent effective Polish resistance and to exploit Polish people as slave laborers, foreseeing the extermination of Poles as a nation. Polish slaves in Nazi Germany were forced to wear identifying red tags with the letter P sewn to their clothing. Sexual relations with Germans (rassenschande or "racial defilement") were punishable by death. During the war, many Polish men were executed for their relations with German women.

Maintain the purity of German blood! That applies to both men and women! Just as it is considered the greatest disgrace to become involved with a Jew, any German engaging in intimate relations with a Polish male or female is guilty of sinful behavior. Despise the bestial urges of this race! Be racially conscious and protect your children. Otherwise you will forfeit your greatest asset: your honor!

In 1942, racial discrimination became Nazi policy with the Decree on Penal Law for Poles and Jews.

During the post-war Trials of Nazis it was stated during Trial of Ulrich Freifelt that:

The methods applied by the Nazis in Poland and other occupied territories, including once more Alsace and Lorraine, were of a similar nature with the sole difference that they were more ruthless and wider in scope than in 1914-1918. In this connection the policy of " Germanizing " the populations concerned, as shown by the evidence in the trial under review, consisted partly in forcibly denationalising given classes or groups of the local population, such as Poles, Alsace-Lorrainers, Slovenes and others eligible for Germanization under the German People’s List. As a result in these cases the programme of genocide was being achieved through acts which, in themselves, constitute war crimes.

— Law Reports of the Trials of War Criminals. United Nations War Crimes Commission. Vol. XIII. London: HMSO, 1949 Trial of Ulrich Greifelt and Others, United States Military Tribunal, Nuremberg, 10 October 1947 – 10 March 1948, Part IV

Likewise, during World War II around 120,000 Polish people, mostly women and children, became the primary victims of ethnic cleansing by the Ukrainian Insurgent Army, which was then operating in the territory of occupied Poland.

== Racism in association football ==
According to The Stephen Roth Institute for the Study of Contemporary Antisemitism and Racism, football stadiums in Poland are a recruiting ground for extremist organisations. As of 2001, neo-fascist symbols were a common sight there.

During the Extraordinary Congress of the International Football Federation (FIFA), held in Buenos Aires from 6–7 July 2001, the problem of racism in Polish football was discussed and Polish national football association was called to join the struggle against racism. The problem of anti-Semitism in Polish football has drawn international criticism. Poland was named as one of the worst offenders, in British Member of Parliament John Mann report, which describes anti-Semitic incidents in 18 countries across Europe. It was noted that Polish fans routinely call each other "Jews" as a term of abuse. In April 2008, ŁKS Łódź player Arkadiusz Mysona wore a shirt which said "Śmierć żydzewskiej kurwie" ("Death to Widzew-Jewish Whore", which is word play used by the LKS Łódź supporters, who call fans of their local rivals "Jews") after a match in the Polish Ekstraklasa. Mysona said afterwards that the shirt was given to him by a fan and he had not checked it.

In 2003, the Polish anti-racist "Never Again" Association organized a tournament with the slogan "Let's Kick Racism out of the Stadiums", imploring the Polish Football Association to act against racism in the sport. In 2012, ahead of UEFA Euro 2012, the Polish anti-racist "Never Again" Association launched one of the most extensive anti-racist campaigns in football, as a long-standing partner of the Fare network. The BBC Panorama program toured football matches in Poland before UEFA Euro 2012, jointly held in Poland and Ukraine. The journalists recorded "a chorus of anti-Semitic chanting" and witnessed "black football players enduring monkey chants from the terraces".

In March 2025, the Football Association of Ireland reported a racist incident in an under-17 match in Poland.

== Studies and surveys ==
=== 2008 EVS survey ===
An analysis based on the European Values Survey (EVS), which took place in 2008, compares Poland to other European nations. Poland had very high levels of political tolerance (lack of extremist political attitudes), relatively high levels of ethnic tolerance (based on attitudes towards Muslims, immigrants, Romas, and Jews) and at the same time low levels of personal tolerance (based on attitudes towards people considered "deviant" or "threatening"). From 1998 to 2008, there was a marked increase in political and ethnic tolerance, but a decrease in personal tolerance.

In 1990, due partly to the political euphoria accompanying the fall of communism, Poland was the most tolerant nation in Central Europe. However, over the course of the '90s, the level of tolerance decreased. By 1999, EVS recorded Poland as having one of the highest rates of xenophobia in Europe, while antisemitism also increased during this time. The factors behind these decreases in tolerance and the radicalization in attitudes towards other ethnic groups during this time likely included the country's economic problems associated with a costly transition from Communism (for example, high unemployment), ineffectual government and possibly an increase in immigration from outside.

These attitudes began to change after 2000, possibly due to Poland's entry into the European Union, increased travel abroad and more frequent encounters with people of other races. By 2008, the EVS showed Poland as one of the least xenophobic countries in Central and Eastern Europe. The negative attitudes towards Jews have likewise returned to their lower 1990s level, although they do remain somewhat above the European average. During the same time period, ethnic tolerance and political tolerance increased in Southern Europe (Spain, Greece) and decreased in other parts of Northern Europe (Netherlands).

While the Roma group was listed as the most rejected, the level of exclusion was still lower than elsewhere in Europe, most likely due to the long history of Roma (see Polska Roma) and their relatively low numbers in the country.

=== 2012 CRP survey ===
In a 2012 survey conducted by the Center for Research on Prejudice at the University of Warsaw, it was found that 78.5% of participants disagreed with traditional antisemitic statements (e.g. "Jews are responsible for the death of Jesus Christ"), but 52.9% agreed with secondary antisemitic statements (e.g. "Jews spread the stereotype of Polish anti-Semitism"), and 64.6% believed in a "Jewish conspiracy" (e.g. "Jews would like to rule the world"). The authors noted that "belief in [a] Jewish conspiracy proved to be the strongest significant predictor of discriminatory intentions towards Jews in all fields. Traditional anti-Semitism predicted social distance towards Jews, while it did not predict any of the other discriminatory intentions. Secondary anti-Semitism failed to predict any form of discriminatory intentions against Jews."

=== 2014 ADL Global 100 survey ===
In the ADL Global 100 survey conducted in 2013–2014, 57% of respondents said that "it is probably true" that "Jews have too much power in the business world"; 55% that "Jews have too much power in international financial markets"; 42% that "Jews have too much control over global affairs"; and 33% that "people hate Jews because of the way Jews behave".

=== 2018 FRA survey ===
In the FRA 2018 Experiences and perceptions of antisemitism/Second survey on discrimination and hate crime against Jews in the EU, antisemitism in Poland was identified as a "fairly big" or "very big" problem by 85% of respondents (placing Poland at the fourth place after France, Germany and Belgium); 61% reported that antisemitism had increased "a lot" in the past five years (second place after France, and before Belgium and Germany); 74% reported that intolerance towards Muslims had increased "a lot" (second place after Hungary, and before Austria and the UK); and 89% reported an increase in expressions of antisemitism online (second place after France, and before Italy and Belgium). The most commonly heard antisemitic statements were "Jews have too much power in Poland" (70%) and "Jews exploit Holocaust victimhood for their own purposes" (67%).

=== 2022 FRA survey ===
A 2022 study by European Agency for Fundamental Rights (EU FRA) found that Black people or people of African descent were least likely to experience discrimination in Poland among 13 EU states that took part in the survey. In the survey responses analyzed by the agency, 21% of respondents stated they had faced discrimination in Poland in the past five years. For comparison, 77% stated they had experienced discrimination in Germany, 44% in Italy and 27% in Sweden and Portugal, the two countries with lowest discrimination after Poland. Poland also had the highest proportion of responders (81%) who stated that when stopped by police in Poland the police officers were "very" or "fairly" respectful.

== Countering racism ==
=== Government action ===
In 2004, the government took some initiatives in order to tackle the problem of racism. It adopted the "National Programme to Prevent Racial Discrimination, Xenophobia and Related Intolerance 2004-2009" ("Krajowy Program Przeciwdziałania Dyskryminacji Rasowej, Ksenofobii i Związanej z Nimi Nietolerancji 2004 – 2009") and also established the Monitoring Team on Racism and Xenophobia within the Ministry of Interior and Administration. The Implementation Report (2010) stated that the programme suffered from various obstacles, including lacking and unclear funding, and eventually some planned tasks were completed, while others were not. In 2013 Polish Prime Minister Donald Tusk started The Council Against Racial Discrimination and Xenophobia, but it was shut down by the new Law and Justice government in May 2016.

== See also ==
- Antisemitism
- Kielce pogrom
- Kraków pogrom
- Jedwabne pogrom
- Islamophobia in Poland
- The Holocaust in Poland
- Hate speech laws in Poland
- Anti-Jewish violence in Poland, 1944–1946
