= Article 196 =

Article 196 may refer to:

- Offending religious feelings (Poland), Article 196 of the Polish criminal code
- Article 196 in the Treaty on the Functioning of the European Union
- Article 196 of the Constitution of India, regarding the procedure of introducing and passing bills in state legislatures
- Article 196 in the 1988 Brazilian constitution, which sets out the requirements for Sistema Único de Saúde
