= Simon Mol =

Cameroonian journalist

- Born: Simon Moleke Njie; 6 November 1973; Buea, Cameroon
- Died: 10 October 2008 (aged 34); Warsaw, Poland

Simon Mol (6 November 1973 – 10 October 2008) was the pen name of Simon Moleke Njie, a Cameroon-born journalist, writer and anti-racist political activist. In 1999 he sought political asylum in Poland; it was granted in 2000, and he moved to Warsaw, where he became a well-known anti-racist campaigner and alleged deliberate spreader of the HIV virus.

== Accusations and Death ==
In Poland, Mol was accused of knowingly spreading the HIV virus and was charged in the cases of eleven women and remanded in custody. However, Mol's trial was suspended due to his severe illness. He died from HIV-related complications on 10 October 2008.

== Life in Africa ==
Mol was born into an English-speaking family in Cameroon. His autobiography states that he worked as a journalist, was persecuted and jailed for his writing, sought political asylum in several African countries, and was granted asylum in Ghana, where he was persecuted again.

On 6 March 2007 newspaper Rzeczpospolita published an article on Simon Mol (Na tropie oszusta Simona Mola by Bertold Kittel and Maja Narbutt in co-operation with Anna Machowska from TVN), stating that his biography was fabricated. An editor of the Cameroonian English language weekly The Sketch denied that Njie worked there; his mother said he was employed at a refinery, didn't write about government corruption in Cameroon, and was not jailed in 1996. A representative of Ghanaian journalists said that while in Ghana, Njie published newspaper articles about football and was never arrested in that country.

== Life in Poland ==
In June 1999 he arrived in Poland as a member of the Ghanaian PEN Club delegation to a PEN annual congress in Warsaw. Njie immediately applied for asylum, which was granted in September 2000.

In Poland Simon Mol wrote poems, founded a small theatre, and engaged in political campaigns for the rights of mostly African and Chechen refugees, anti-racism, anti-fascism and environmental protection. A journal article, Post–Unification Anglophone Exile Poetry: Introducing Simon Mol & Kangsen Feka Wakai, reviewed his poetry in 2006.

His activities brought attention to presumed racial discrimination in Poland, with him filing reports to Amnesty International about the alleged institutional racism.

== Sports ==
He was a football player in the Mazur Karczew football team. One of the matches that he organized himself for his all-Black team was against Polonia Warszawa, according to the bulletin of the Polish Humanitarian Organisation.

He later used his sports team for political campaigns.

== Public career ==
He became a journalist of The Warsaw Voice, the secretary general of Association of Refugees in the Republic of Poland, the chief editor of "The Voice of the Refugees" ("Głos Uchodźców")

In 2005 he organized a conference with Black ambassadors in Poland to protest the claims in an article in Wiedza i Życie by Adam Leszczyński about AIDS problems in Africa, which quoted research stating that the majority of African women were unable to persuade their HIV positive husbands to wear condoms, and so later contracted HIV themselves. Mol accused Leszczyński of prejudice because of this article.

As a cultural representative of the international anti-racist sports campaigns organized by UEFA, he was sent to conferences in Italy and the UK.

== HIV criminal infection ==
South African Press Association (SAPA) and Agence France Presse in their article described him as "a darling of Poland's liberal press" due to his political campaigns Some of his victims were reportedly intimidated and threatened and for a long time Polish police did not arrest him because of his political connections, thus allowing him to infect new victims.

In February 2006, one of his partners requested that he take an HIV test. Mol refused and published a post on his blog explaining why:

Character assassination isn't a new phenomenon. However, it appears here the game respects no rules. It wouldn't be superfluous to state that there is an ingrained, harsh and disturbing dislike for Africans here. The accusation of being HIV positive is the latest weapon that as an African your enemy can raise against you. This ideologically inspired weapon, is strengthened by the day with disturbing literature about Africa from supposed-experts on Africa, some of whom openly boast of traveling across Africa in two weeks and return home to write volumes. What some of these hastily compiled volumes have succeeded in breeding, is a social and psychological conviction that every African walking the street here is supposedly HIV positive, and woe betide anyone who dares to unravel the myth being put in place.

According to the police inspector who was investigating his case, a witness stated that Mol refused to wear condoms during sex. An anonymous witness in one case said that he accused a girl who demanded he should wear them of being racist because she thought he must be infected with HIV just because he was black. After sexual intercourse he used to say to his female partners that his sperm was sacred.

In November 2006, criminal proceedings were initiated over allegations of deliberate HIV transmission.

On 3 January 2007 Mol was taken into custody by the Polish police and charged with infecting his sexual partners with HIV. According to the newspaper Rzeczpospolita, he was diagnosed with HIV back in 1999 while living in a refugee shelter, but Polish law does not force an HIV carrier to reveal his or her disease status.

In an unusual move, the then Minister of Justice Zbigniew Ziobro ordered that a photograph of Mol with an epidemiological warning attached be displayed publicly. MediaWatch, a body that monitors alleged racism, quickly denounced this decision, asserting that it was a breach of ethics with racist implications, as the picture had been published before any court verdict. They saw it as evidence of institutional racism in Poland, also calling for international condemnation.

After his arrest, Mol stated he had no knowledge of being an HIV carrier and accused the police of racism.

Mol was put on trial in July 2008, but the trial was suspended when Mol's health deteriorated. Due to this and previous procedural delays, at this point the case on behalf of his victims was taken over by high-key lawyer and former minister of Education Roman Giertych, who demanded that the case be requalified as intentional murder and demanded life sentence for Mol, thus increasing the profile of the case.

Mol was hospitalised, suffering from acute renal failure. Mol died on 10 October 2008 in Warsaw. Until his death he stated he had no knowledge of being infected by HIV, claiming that his case was political.

== Social and political impact ==
Mol's affair had a high domestic profile and political impact in Poland. A study by Agnieszka Weinar stated that "The incident was widely discussed in the media, but it did not have any political repercussions". The study, conducted before Mol's death, showed that the number of articles were comparable with Polish coverage of the London bombings of July 2005; urban riots in France in autumn 2005; and Danish cartoons affair.

== Epidemiological impact ==
=== Initial testing after disclosure ===
After police published Mol's photo and an alert before the start of court proceedings, Warsaw HIV testing centers were "invaded by young women". A few said that they knew Mol, and some of the HIV tests have been positive.

A record number of HIV virus cases were detected in Mazovia and Poland as a whole in January 2007 due to large amounts of testing caused by the panic. Simon Mol had visited Gdańsk in September 2006, where he helped organize the anti-racist "Music against Intolerance and Violence" festival. After Mol's epidemiological alert was published, the number of HIV tests in the Gdańsk provincial centers exceeded 100 a day, including two worried males who learnt that their partners had slept with Mol, while the usual number had been hovering around a dozen cases daily beforehand.

=== Changed refugee law ===
Despite concerns voiced by UNHCR in April 2007, plans for HIV testing of all asylum seekers were fully introduced in Poland shortly after Mol's well-publicised trial. Poland joined Iceland and Slovakia as the only three countries in Europe to offer HIV testing prior to entry for all migrants on arrival, with other EU countries limiting their tests to specific ethnic groups, mostly from sub-Saharan Africa, Asia, and Eastern Europe.

== Awards and recognition ==
In 2003, he received the award "Antifascist of the Year" given by the Nigdy Więcej ("Never Again") anti-racism association.

In 2004, on behalf of the President of Poland, he was nominated for the Sergio Vieira de Mello Prize, alongside the ex-PM Tadeusz Mazowiecki and other Polish luminaries, for "rebuilding peace in post-conflict communities", under the patronage of the High Commissioner of the United Nations for Refugees, among other institutions.

Mol was an honorary member of the British International Pen Club Centre.

In 2006 Mol received the prestigious Oxfam Novib/PEN Award for Freedom of Expression.

== See also ==
- Circumcision and HIV
- Criminal transmission of HIV
