= Natalia Muianga =

Polish singer and songwriter (born 1998)

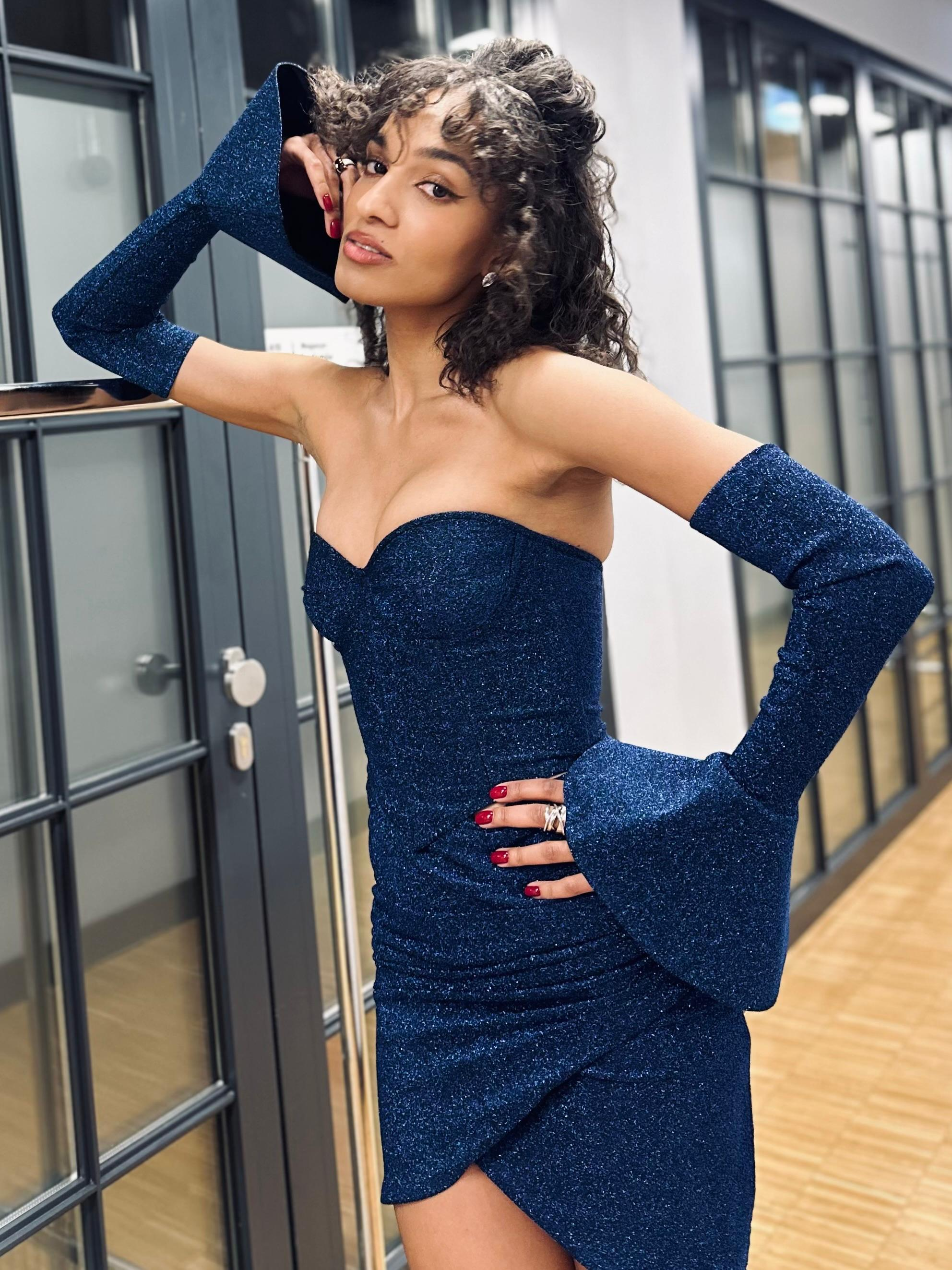
Natalia Muianga, 2025

Natalia Capelik-Muianga (born April 17, 1998) is a Polish-born singer of mixed Polish-Mozambican descent.

== Awards ==
- 2020: Grand Prix at the Ladies' Jazz Festival
