= Death of Maxwell Itoya =

2010 police shooting in Warsaw, Poland

Maxwell Itoya (died 23 May 2010) was a Nigerian immigrant in Poland, who was killed in a police raid on a flea market in Warsaw, Poland. His death was amid a confrontation of non-white migrant traders with police, which grew into a riot followed by the mass arrest of migrants. The event also led to a debate in the Polish media regarding policing and racism.

== Death ==
Itoya worked as a street vendor at an open-air market in the Praga district of Warsaw selling counterfeit shoes. Itoya had been living in Poland for eight years and was married to a Pole with whom he had three children. On 23 May 2010, there was an action of the Polish Police on a market to curb down on illegal and black market trade. After one of the traders was asked for documents and refused to give them, police arrested him. Itoya interrupted and asked why. Afterwards, Itoya died after being shot by police. 32 immigrant traders were rounded up and arrested, including 29 Nigerians, one Cameroonian, one Guinean and one Indian. The police and press described this as a riot.

The exact reason for the lethal shot being fired is unclear: police sources said that it was an accident and took place during a riot that started when vendors were checked for documents and thus Itoya was being arrested; according to witness' accounts the riot only started after the police opened fire.

== Aftermath ==
The next day, a demonstration of 50 immigrants and activists marched protesting against the police's actions, chanting slogans such as: "The police have blood on their hands" and "Stop racism and police brutality". The police officer who shot Itoya was not suspended from duty or charged with any crime.

Itoya's widow, Monika Pacak-Itoya, sought compensation from the police authorities.

Despite massive evidence collected, the case of Itoya's death remained inconclusive "due to conflicting evidence". The investigation was dropped on 17 May 2012. The issue was monitored by the Strategic Litigation Programme of the Helsinki Foundation for Human Rights (Poland). Artur Brzeziński, the policeman who killed Itoya, was not suspended from duty nor charged with any crime.

== See also ==
- Racism in Poland
- List of killings by law enforcement officers in Poland
