= August Agbola O'Browne =

Nigerian musician

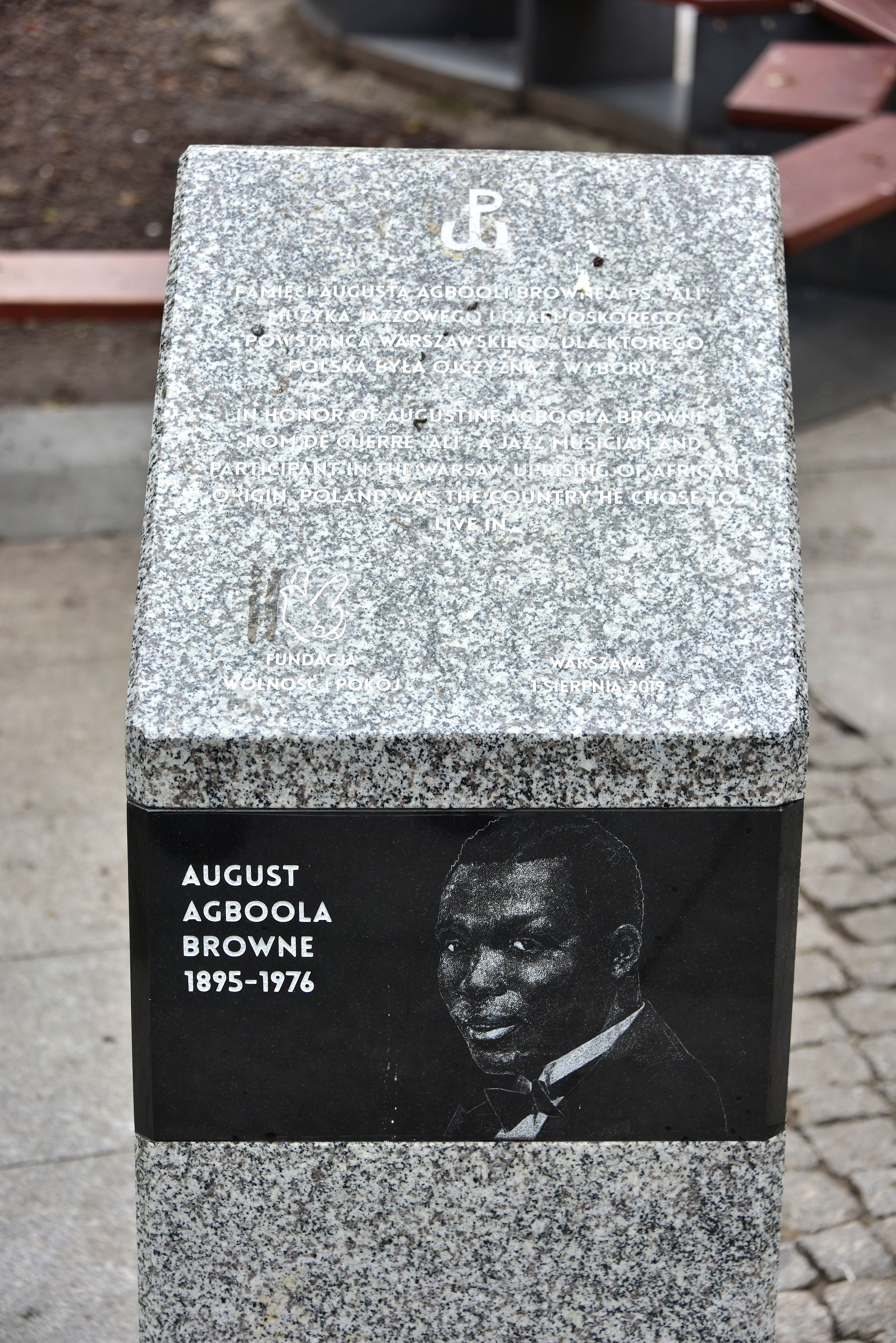
- Memorial to O'Browne in Warsaw
- Born: 22 July 1895; Lagos, Lagos Colony (Nigeria)
- Died: 9 September 1976 (aged 81); London, United Kingdom
- Other names: Augustine, Augustus, Agbala, Agboola, Brown, Browne
- Citizenship: Polish, British
- Occupations: jazz drummer, Polish resistance member
- Children: 4

August Agbola O'Browne (second name also spelled Agbala, Agboola, surname also spelled Brown or Browne; 1895–1976) was a Nigerian jazz musician who is believed to have been the only black participant of the 1944 Warsaw Uprising.

== Biography ==
August Agbola O'Browne was born on 22 July 1895 in Lagos, the largest city of modern-day Nigeria, to Nigerian parents, who were possibly Yoruba.

O'Browne immigrated to Britain and then joined a travelling theatre group and ended up in Poland in 1922. He lived at Złota Street in Warsaw. He was a professional musician, a drummer who worked in clubs in Warsaw. His first album, recorded in 1928, made history, for he was the first West African jazzman to achieve this. He married a Polish woman, Zofia Pykowna; they had two children – Ryszard (Richard) in 1928 and Aleksander (Alexander) in 1929. Although this marriage ended, his family travelled to the UK when war broke out. He later married Olga Miechowicz and they had children together. His friends and neighbours remembered him as a very intelligent, courteous person, and a polyglot (he spoke six languages).

In 1949, he joined the Union of Fighters for Freedom and Democracy. In the survey, he claimed that he fought in the Invasion of Poland in 1939, defending besieged Warsaw, and in the Warsaw Uprising in 1944. He stated that in the Uprising his code name was "Ali" and that he belonged to the unit led by Corporal Aleksander Marciński, code-name "Łabędź" ("Swan"). The unit fought in the Śródmieście district of Warsaw. Based on the name of the commander, historians confirmed that battalion "Iwo" fought in the district of Śródmieście Południowe (Southern Srodmiescie). Jan Radecki, code name "Czarny" ("Black"), another participant of the same uprising claimed that he saw a black man at the headquarters of the battalion "Iwo" at ulica Marszałkowska 74 (74 Marszalkowska Street), possibly in the communication section. Radecki did not remember the exact personal data of the black insurgent. There are indications that before the uprising O'Browne was connected with the resistance and distributed illegal, underground newspapers (bibuła).

There is little reliable information on his life after the war. Around 1949 he worked in the Department of Culture and Art of the City of Warsaw; later he continued his music career, playing in restaurants in Warsaw.

=== Life in the UK ===
O'Browne emigrated to Great Britain in 1958. "Of Browne's existence in the UK, Tatiana informed [...] her father continued to work as a percussionist in London, often at a studio in the Soho district, the home of London's jazz and swing music scene. The family resided in Camden Town, northwest London."

"Londoner Ela Grabinska-Raubusch, an affiliate of the Sikorski Institute, recalls her late mother, Wanda Grabińska (née Radzikowska), a Warsaw insurgent, speaking about Browne. "My mother said that he was very famous in Warsaw before the war, since he was probably the only black person in the capital," she said.

"As for his insurgent career, I only know what I've read online. Except, coincidentally, he was in Śródmieście Południowe, and so was my mother. She was in the Ruczaj battalion. Mum came to London in 1957. I understand that Mr Browne came in 1958.

"Mum did talk about how she met Mr Browne, and that he was with his daughter. Either at Shepherd's Bush Market or at the office of [a man named] Mehl, who dealt with transfers of money to Poland in the years 1950 to 1980. We lived in Shepherd's Bush for a while. In the 1960s, Shepherd's Bush Market was the hangout for the Caribbean community. The stalls were run by West Indians and various Polish Jews. My mother didn't speak English, so she could go ahead and buy from them in Polish.""

There he lived anonymously for almost two decades and died in London in 1976. He was buried in Hampstead Cemetery (as Augustine Agboola Browne).

=== Discovery ===
Information about O'Browne's existence was discovered by historian Zbigniew Osiński from the Warsaw Uprising Museum around 2010; another historian Krzysztof Komorowski noted that if the story of his existence and participation in the Uprising as the only documented black insurgent is true, it is quite sensational. Unfortunately, very little evidence remains to corroborate it and most of the witnesses are dead. Nonetheless, Polish historians have found enough corroborating evidence to conclude that the existence of O'Browne, and the story of his participation in the Uprising, is very likely true.

A stone monument to him was installed in Warsaw in 2019.
