= Ikpe Umoh Imeh =

Ikpe Umoh Imeh (or Obong (Chief) Ikpe Umoh Imeh) (April 22, 1906 – September 29, 2004) was a Member of Parliament from Akwa Ibom State and Deputy Speaker of Parliament for the Eastern Region, Nigeria during the Nigerian First Republic. Umoh was born in Onuk Ukpom in Abak Local Government Area. His father was the late Chief Umoh Imeh Akpakpan Eso Akpan, a farmer of Ntobong Royal Family. His mother, Nwaeka Umoabasi, was from Ikono in Abak.

== Education ==
Imeh attended Abak Government School from 1923 to 1929. From there he attended the Uyo Teachers Training College (now University of Uyo) where he obtained his teaching certification in 1934. He studied agricultural science in Umuahia.

== Career ==
In his early years Imeh worked as a teacher and as a civil servant until he entered politics in 1951. Imeh first won an election into the Eastern House of Assembly, Enugu State with the National Council of Nigeria and the Cameroons party.

- January 1952—Federal House of Representatives, Lagos
- 1953—reelection to the Eastern House of Assembly
- 1954—Acting Minister of Local Government
- 1955—First Minister of Trade Eastern Region, Nigeria
- 1956—1957—Minister of Welfare
- 1960—Deputy Speaker, Eastern Nigeria House of Assembly
- 1960–1961—Chairman, Public Accounts Committee

Imeh's career in politics ended with the military overthrow of the Nigerian First Republic civilian government by Chukwuma Kaduna Nzeogwu in January 1966. During and after the Nigerian Civil War, Imeh returned to teaching. In 1981, under the Nigerian Second Republic, President Shehu Shagari awarded Imeh a National Honour of the Cadre of Officer of the Order of the Niger
