= Profaning a monument =

Criminal act in Poland

Profaning a monument (Polish: Znieważenie pomnika), also translated as insulting a monument, is criminalized by Article 261 of the Criminal Code of Poland, punishable by a fine or restriction of liberty. The law makes no distinction between worthy and unworthy objects of commemoration. A relatively small number of people have been charged under the law, of whom not all were convicted.

== Law ==
Article 261 of the Polish Criminal Code states in its entirety: "Whoever profanes a monument or other public place commemorating a historic event or honour a person shall be subject to a fine or the penalty of restriction of liberty". Therefore, insulting a monument can only be done deliberately.

The crime does not require physical damage to or physical contact with the monument. A separate article criminalizes property damage, otherwise known as vandalism (Article 288). One example of prohibited action under the law is "performing activities that are commonly recognised as discrediting the honour or memory of a person or a historic event".

== Scope of protection ==
The law makes no distinction between worthy and unworthy objects of commemoration (such as Soviet monuments or statues of pedophiles). However, in practice those who insult Communist monuments are not punished. According to Marta Mozgawa-Saj, the law is unclear "whether it is possible to 'desecrate' the monument that 'commemorates persons, organisations, events or dates symbolising communism or another totalitarian system'". She adds that:

in case the place is arranged to commemorate a person or historic events that are negative from the point of view of the Polish state’s interests or Polish history, it is not justified to provide it with legal protection and desecration thereof will not constitute crime under Article 261 CC.

== Cases ==
A relatively small number of people have been charged under the law, of whom not all were convicted.

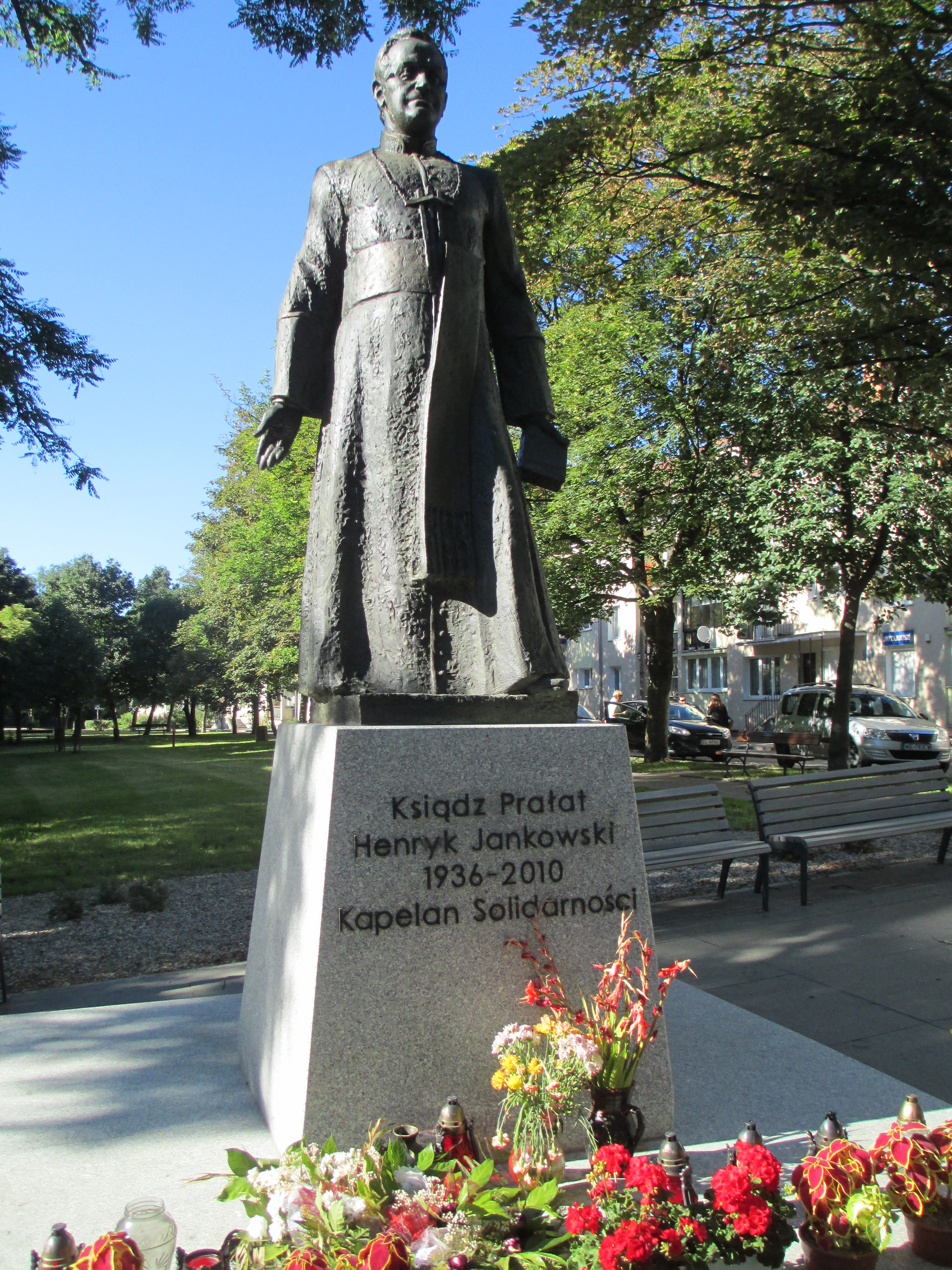
Former statue of Henryk Jankowski by Giennadij Jerszow in Gdańsk

In 2018, Committee for the Defence of Democracy activists hung signs saying "konstytucja" ("constitution") on the Mermaid of Warsaw statue and a statue of former president Lech Kaczyński. They were charged with insulting a monument with regards to the latter incident but not the former. In 2019, proceedings were discontinued because "the accused expressed his political views, and according to the provisions of the Constitution, everyone has the right to do so".

On the night of 20–21 February 2019, three Warsaw residents toppled a statue of Henryk Jankowski in Gdańsk; Jankowski was a Catholic priest accused of sexual abuse. One of the accused was a member of Citizens of Poland and an antifascist committee at the University of Warsaw, where he was an instructor. The perpetrators stated in a manifesto that they sought to oppose "the presence of evil personified in the public space, contempt for and objectification of another human being, violation of their freedom and privacy, psychological terror, disrespect for the pain and anger of the victims". They were charged with insulting a monument and vandalism. The statue was ultimately removed but charges of insulting a monument were not dropped.

In 2019, some teenagers were arrested for riding skateboards on the monument to the victims of the Smolensk disaster in Warsaw.

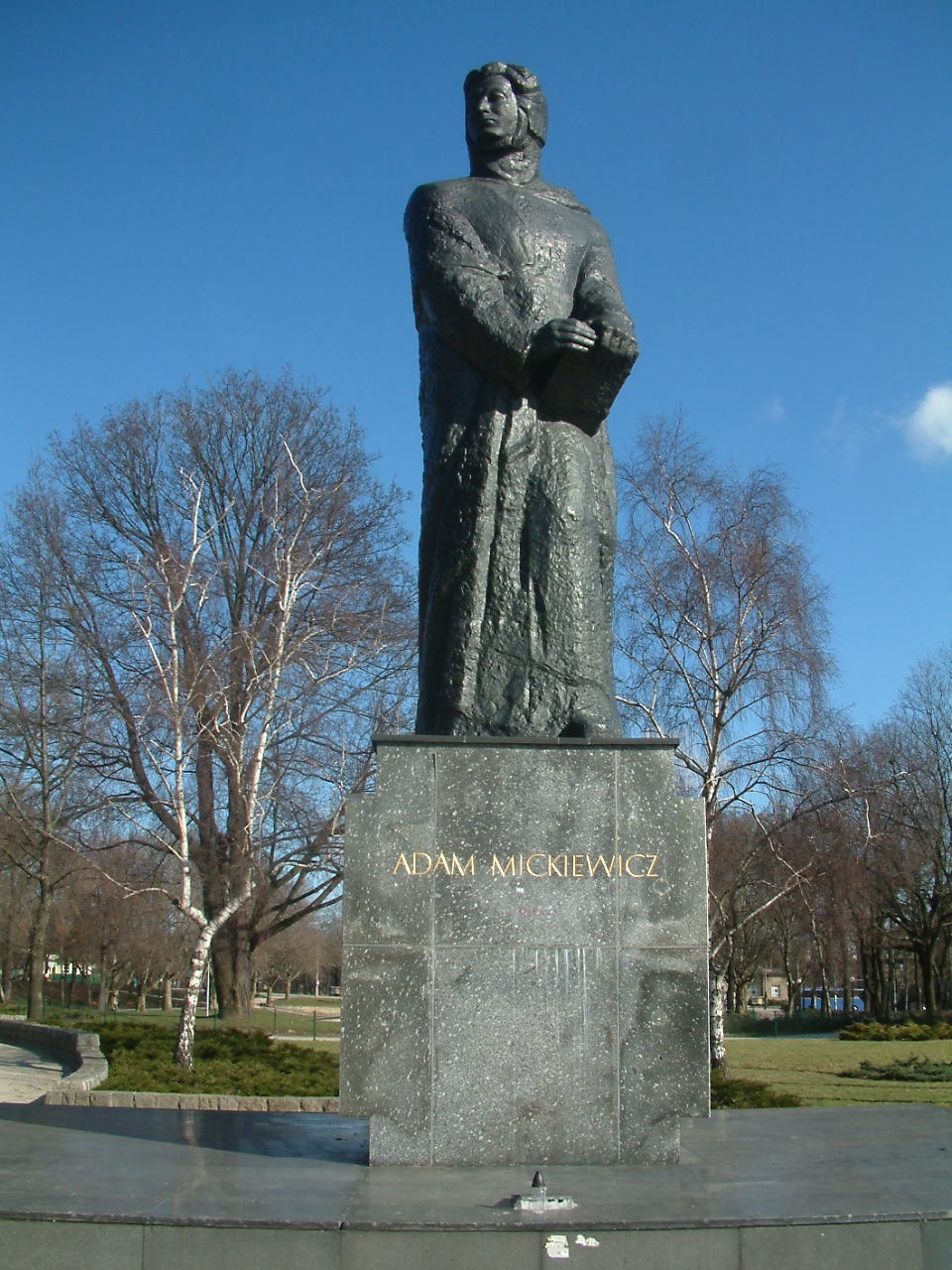
Adam Mickiewicz monument in Poznan

In late July 2020, Stop Bzdurom placed rainbow flags and anarchist bandanas on statues of Nicolaus Copernicus, Józef Piłsudski, the Mermaid of Warsaw, and Jesus in Warsaw. The activists released a manifesto, stating, "As long as the rainbow scandalizes anybody and is treated as inappropriate we solemnly pledge to provoke". The action shocked some Polish Catholics, including Law and Justice Prime Minister Mateusz Morawiecki, who called the actions "desecration" and posted photographs of himself in front of the Jesus statue. On 5 August, three activists involved in the flag drapings were arrested for insulting religious feelings and insulting monuments, charged, and released after about 40 hours. Warsaw's mayor, Rafał Trzaskowski, stated that he disapproved of the flag draping but criticized the arrests for violating the rule of law. According to police, the rainbow flag insults some monuments but not others.

Opponents of prosecution in such cases say that rainbow is not an offensive symbol, and the activists did not intend to profane the monument. In August, rainbow flags were also hung on monuments in Warsaw and other parts of Poland, for instance Poznań prosecutor Magdalena Włodarczak refused to prosecute the hanging of a flag on the Adam Mickiewicz monument in Poznan because of the "lack of features of a prohibited act". In September 2020, activist Małgorzata Pingot was questioned by police after having hung a rainbow flag over the Copernicus statue in Piotrków Trybunalski on 12 August. Police had been present when the flag was raised but did not intervene. In the past, various articles had been placed on the monument, and the head was painted green, without a criminal complaint being made.

== Criticism ==
Criticism of the law argues that it impedes freedom of expression and that it was adopted by the totalitarian Communist government.

== See also ==
- Offending religious feelings
