= Alain Ngamayama =

Polish footballer

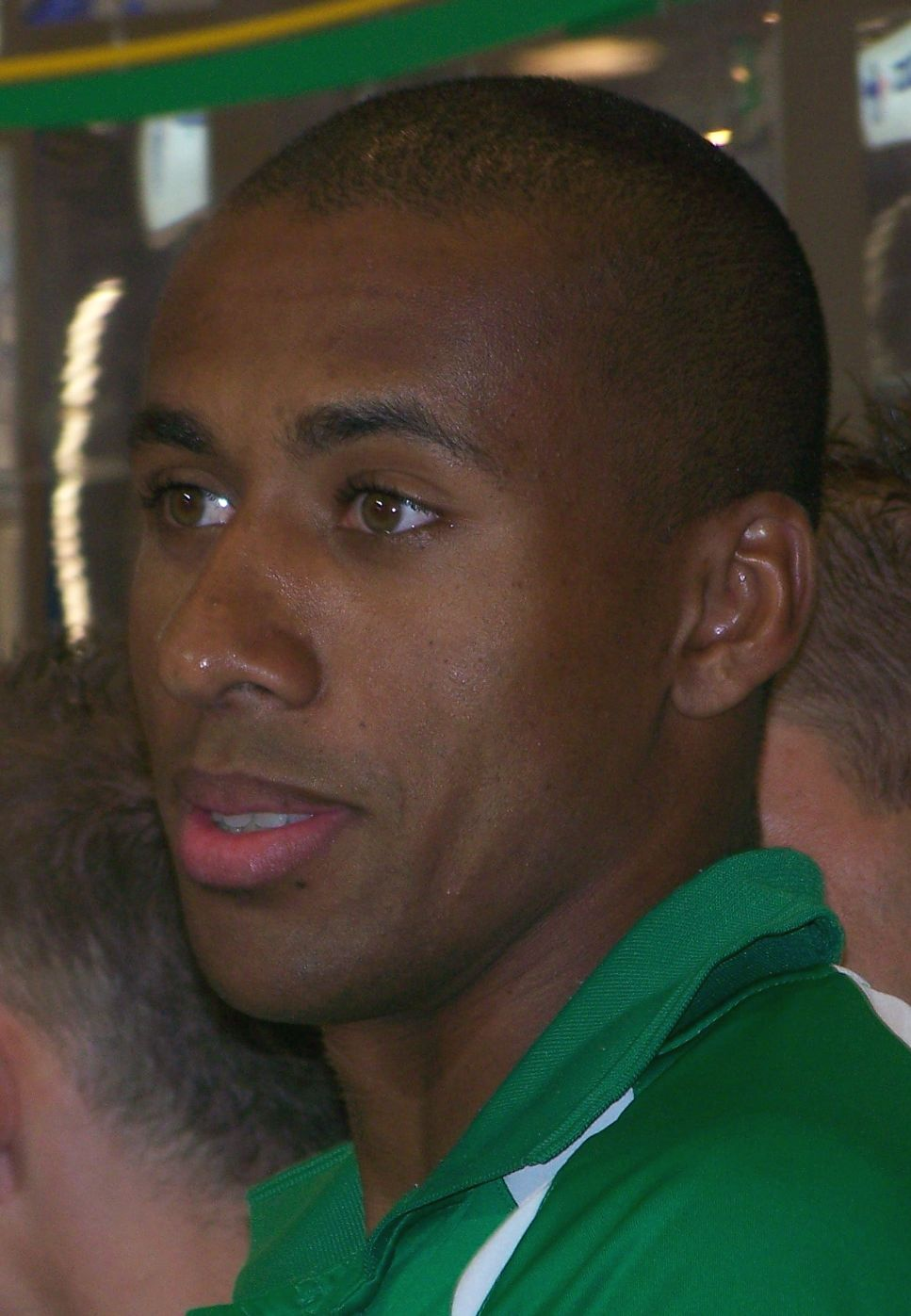

Personal information
- Date of birth: 23 May 1984 (age 42)
- Place of birth: Poznań, Poland
- Height: 1.82 m (5 ft 11 1/2 in)
- Positions: Centre-back; midfielder

Youth career
- Warta Poznań

Senior career*
Years	Team	Apps	(Gls)
2003–2004	Luboński KS		
2004–2017	Warta Poznań	249	(10)
2017–2018	Polonia Środa Wlkp.	19	(1)
2018–2021	Stella Luboń	64	(23)
- * Club domestic league appearances and goals

Alain Ngamayama (born 23 May 1984) is a Polish former professional footballer who played mostly as a centre-back.

Ngamayama was the captain of Warta Poznań for many years and is widely considered a club hero.

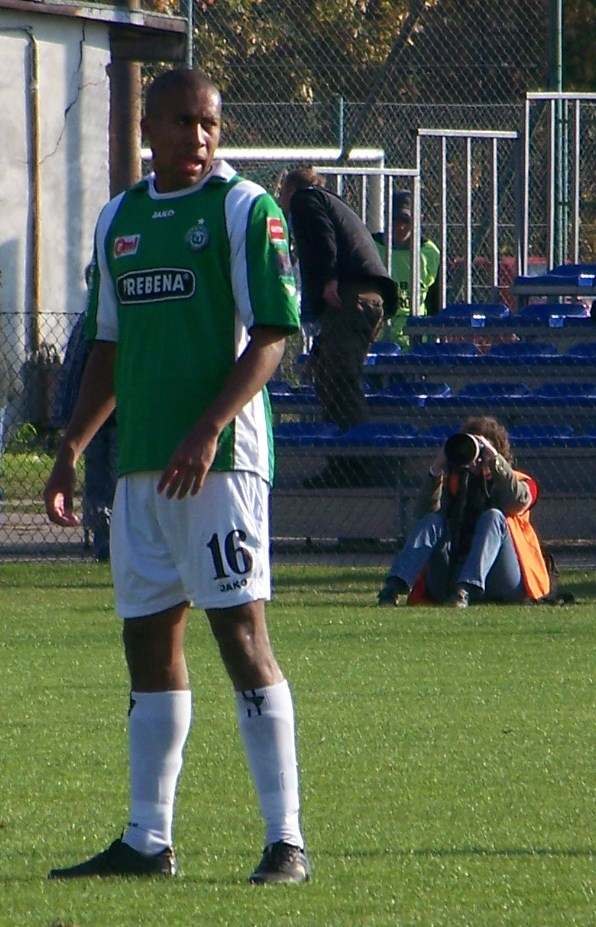
Alain Ngamayama at Warta

He was born to a Zairean father and Polish mother, however considers himself fully Polish having been born in Greater Poland. He grew up in Poznań and began in Warta's youth teams. Despite the club's varying fortunes he stayed with them throughout his career, barring a short stint for one season early in his career, and in recent years as he was nearing retirement.

== Honours ==
Warta Poznań

- III liga Kuyavia-Pomerania – Greater Poland: 2014–15, 2015–16

Polonia Środa Wielkopolska

- Polish Cup (Greater Poland regionals): 2017–18
- Polish Cup (Poznań regionals): 2017–18

Stella Luboń

- Klasa A Poznań III: 2018–19
- Polish Cup (Poznań regionals): 2019–20, 2020–21
