= Arkadiusz Mysona =

Polish footballer

Personal information
- Full name: Arkadiusz Stanisław Mysona
- Date of birth: 11 May 1981 (age 45)
- Place of birth: Szczecin, Poland
- Height: 1.71 m (5 ft 7 in)
- Position: Midfielder

Youth career
- Pogoń Szczecin

Senior career*
Years	Team	Apps	(Gls)
2001–2002	Pogoń Szczecin	3	(0)
2002–2003	Zorza Dobrzany		
2003–2008	ŁKS Łódź	122	(13)
2008–2010	Lechia Gdańsk	38	(1)
2010	→ Polonia Bytom (loan)	10	(0)
2011	Termalica Bruk-Bet	11	(0)
2012	Torgelower SV	11	(1)
2012–2013	Wisła Płock	37	(0)
2014	Chojniczanka Chojnice	15	(0)
2014–2015	ŁKS Łódź	14	(1)
2015	Arkonia Szczecin		(2)
2015–2017	Blau-Weiß Energie Prenzlau	48	(6)
2017–2018	KS Kutno	28	(0)
2018–2019	Ehrle Dobra	20	(2)
2019–2020	Victoria 1914 Templin	5	(0)
2020–2022	Ehrle Dobra	32	(6)
- * Club domestic league appearances and goals

Arkadiusz Mysona (born 11 May 1981) is a Polish former professional footballer who played as a midfielder.

== Career ==
Mysona was born in Szczecin. In April 2008, while at ŁKS Łódź, he wore a shirt which said "Śmierć żydzewskiej kurwie" ("Death to Widzew-Jewish Whore", which is word play used by the LKS Łódź supporters, who call fans of their local rivals "Jews") after a match in the Polish Ekstraklasa. Mysona said afterwards that the shirt was given to him by a fan and he had not checked it. In February 2011, he joined LKS Nieciecza on a one-and-a-half-year contract.

== Honours ==
Wisła Płock

- II liga East: 2012–13
