= Hate speech laws in Poland =

The hate speech laws in Poland derive from its Constitution and from its Penal Code. The laws discourage any conduct that foments racial, national, or sectarian hatred. The laws punish those who intentionally offend the feelings of the religious, e.g. by disturbing services or creating public calumny. They also prohibit public expression that insults a person or a group on account of national, ethnic, racial, or religious affiliation or the lack of a religious affiliation.

In November 2024, the Polish Prime Minister Donald Tusk agreed to legislation which would add sexual orientation, gender, age and disability into the country's existing hate speech laws. The legislation headed to the Parliament where it received a majority of votes needed to become law. The legislation was submitted for presidential signature on March 6. It was then referred to the Constitutional Tribunal by the President for a review, as the law raised doubts over its compliance with the constitution.

== Constitution of Poland ==
Article 54 of the Constitution protects freedom of speech. By its Article 13, the Constitution prohibits political parties and other organizations which have programmes based upon totalitarian methods and the modes of activity of nazism, fascism, and communism. Article 13 further prohibits any programmes or activities which promote racial or national hatred. Article 35 gives national and ethnic minorities the right to establish educational and cultural institutions and institutions designed to protect religious identity.

== Criminal Code of Poland ==
Article 196 makes anyone found guilty of intentionally offending religious feelings through public calumny of an object or place of worship liable to a fine, a restriction of liberty, or to imprisonment for a maximum of two years.

Article 256 makes anyone found guilty of promoting a fascist or other totalitarian system of state or of inciting hatred based on national, ethnic, racial, or religious differences, or for reason of the lack of any religious denomination, liable to a fine, a restriction of liberty, or to imprisonment for a maximum of two years.

Article 257 makes anyone found guilty of publicly insulting a group or a particular person because of national, ethnic, racial, or religious affiliation or because of the lack of any religious denomination liable to a fine, a restriction of liberty, or to imprisonment for a maximum of three years.

== Broadcasting Act (29 December 1992) ==
Article 18, paragraph 2 states that programmes or other broadcasts shall respect the religious beliefs of the public and respect especially the Christian system of values. Article 16b, paragraph 3 forbids the use of contents which are discriminatory on the grounds of race, gender, nationality, ethnic background, religion or belief, disability, age or sexual orientation.

== Selected cases ==
On 13 December 2019, the police arrested Jacek Miedlar for violating the Criminal Code on the grounds of, "inciting hatred against Jews and Holocaust denial." The prosecutors cited a November 2017 speech Jacek gave in Wrocław in which he called on his audience to, "be merciless and radical in the fight against ... Talmudism."

On 4 May 2010, the police charged singer Doda, whose real name is Dorota Rabczewska, with violating the Criminal Code for saying in 2009 that the Bible was "unbelievable" and written by people "drunk on wine and smoking some kind of herbs".

On 8 March 2010, the police charged vocalist and guitarist Adam Darski, of the Polish blackened death metal band Behemoth, with violating the Criminal Code. The charge arose out of a performance by Behemoth in September 2007 in Gdynia during which Darski allegedly called the Catholic Church "the most murderous cult on the planet", and he tore up a copy of the Bible.

On 28 August 2006, police arrested Leszek Bubel for violating Article 257 of the Criminal Code by publishing antisemitic literature. On 7 December 2006, the authorities sent Bubel to a mental hospital in Tworki.

On 14 April 2006, the Jan Karski Association complained that a broadcast on a Catholic radio station defamed the Jewish people and violated Article 257 of the Criminal Code. Prosecutors refused to pursue the matter.

In February 2006, readers complained about an issue of the magazine Machina, which featured the likeness of the singer Madonna superimposed upon a depiction of the Virgin Mary with Jesus. Prosecutors refused to pursue the matter.

On 28 October 2005, a Provincial Court convicted Leszek Bubel of violating Article 257 of the Criminal Code by publishing antisemitic literature. The Court sentenced Bubel to a fine.

In December 2001, Members of the League of Polish Families complained that the artwork called "Passion" by Nieznalska was a violation of Article 196 of the Criminal Code. In July 2003, the Provincial Court in Gdańsk found Nieznalska guilty. The court sentenced her to a half-year "restriction of freedom," ordered her to do community work, and required her to pay all trial expenses. On 28 April 2004, the District Court in Gdańsk quashed the previous judgment.

In October 2001, the prosecutor in Kraków received complaints that the movie Dogma violated Article 196 of the Criminal Code. The prosecutor refused to pursue the matter.

In August 1994, the Regional Prosecutor's Office in Poznań received complaints about the magazine Wprost, which featured a cover that had the Virgin Mary and Jesus wearing gas masks. The prosecutor refused to pursue the matter.
