= Offending religious feelings (Poland) =

Polish blasphemy law

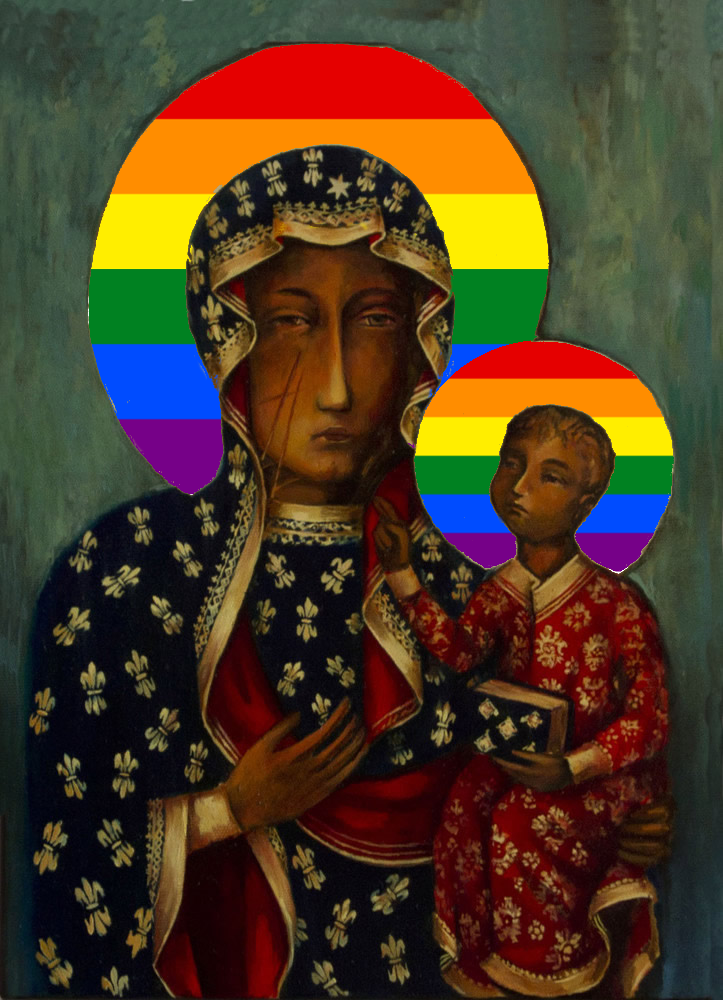
Rainbow Madonna, an adaptation of the Black Madonna of Częstochowa, which is considered offensive to religious sentiments.

Offending religious feelings (Polish: Obraza uczuć religijnych) is a blasphemy law in Poland. According to Article 196 of the Penal Code: "Whoever offends the religious feelings of other persons by publicly insulting an object of religious worship, or a place designated for public religious ceremonies, is liable to pay a fine, have their liberty limited, or be deprived of their liberty for a period of up to two years."

== Constitutionality ==
A law forbidding blasphemy was included in the original 1932 Polish penal code.

The Constitutional Tribunal has ruled that the law is not in conflict with the Constitution of Poland and is not overbroad. The European Court of Human Rights has also allowed other blasphemy laws under margin of appreciation doctrine, as individual countries have broad ability to set moral standards.

Polish law has no provision which exempts or reduces the scrutiny applied to artistic expression alleged to violate the law, although many artists who have been accused of violating it say that their work should be protected as artistic freedom.

A separate law, Article 256, criminalizes incitement to hatred based on religious belief.

== Cases ==
The majority of cases in which charges of Article 196 are made do not lead to actual convictions. About 55 prosecutions on average were brought each year between 1999 and 2016. Since Poland is a predominantly Catholic country (around 87% of Poles say they were baptized as Catholics), most Article 196 cases concern that religion.

In 2000, Polish artist Dorota Nieznalska juxtaposed Greek cross with male genitalia in an artistic exhibition. In 2009 she was finally acquitted after lengthy legal proceedings, due to the court not finding an intent to offend religious feelings.

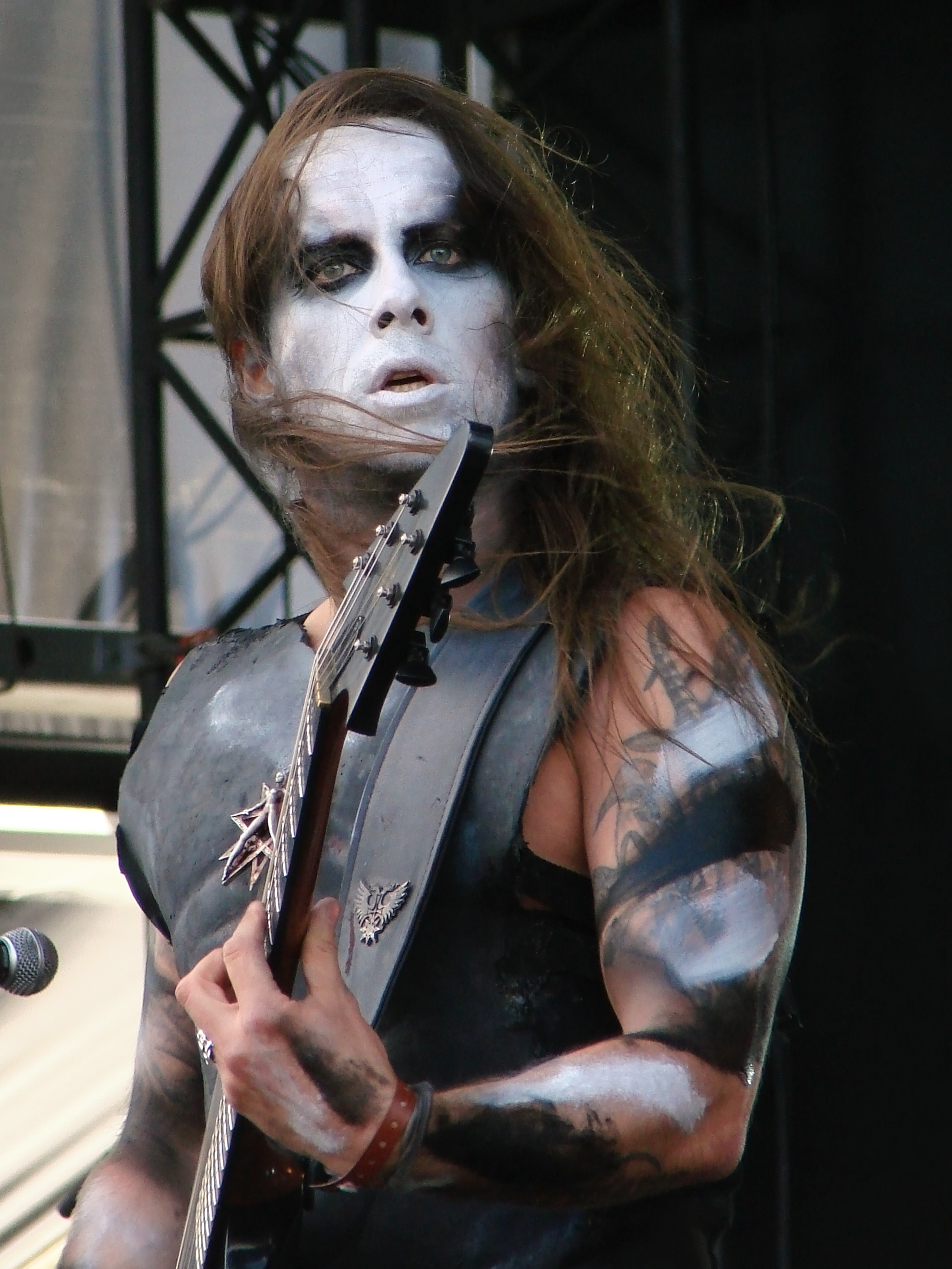
Darski performing at Hellfest 2010

In 2008, musician Adam Darski tore up a Bible during a performance, referring to it as "the book of lies". He was acquitted after the performance was deemed not to be sufficiently public, the audience had bought tickets and consented to the performance, and only one audience member complained. After his acquittal, Darski announced his intention to hold "Satanist communion" during performances.

In 2009, singer Dorota Rabczewska (Doda) referred to the Bible as "something written by individuals high on alcohol and weed". She was convicted and fined. The European Court of Human Rights ruled in 2022 that the conviction violated Article 10 of the ECHR and ordered the state of Poland to pay Rabczewska €10,000 in compensation.

In 2015, Robert Biedroń, mayor of Słupsk, was investigated for removing a portrait of John Paul II from his office after PiS activists reported him for allegedly offending religious feelings.

In 2019, Elżbieta Podleśna was arrested for displaying a Rainbow Madonna adaptation of the Black Madonna of Częstochowa. In July 2020, Podleśna and two other activists were formally charged with offending religious feelings; they pled not guilty. Helsinki Foundation for Human Rights and Amnesty International criticized the use of the law.

In October 2019, Bishop Szymon Niemiec of the United Ecumenical Church was interrogated by police under suspicion of offending religious feelings "by insulting the object of worship in the form of a Catholic Mass"; police had received more than 150 complaints regarding the incident. He had held an ecumenical, LGBT-inclusive religious service in connection with Warsaw's 2019 Equality Parade, which was criticized by the Catholic Episcopal Conference of Poland and Law and Justice politicians. Niemiec previously held similar services every year since 2010 without controversy. Niemiec and Julia Maciocha, president of the committee which organizes Equality Parade, stated that the complaint against Niemiec violates the constitutional guarantee of freedom of religion.

In June 2021, pastor Paweł Chojecki, editor-in-chief of Against the Tide TV, has been tried for insulting the religious feelings of Catholics. The pastor was sentenced to eight months of restriction of freedom in the form of 20 hours per month of community work and reimbursement of the costs of the trial – more than 20 thousand PLN. The judgment was not legally valid. On 5 June, The Court of Appeals upheld the verdict of the court of first instance. The pastor was also ordered to pay the costs of both instances. Under the Polish system, Pastor Chojecki can no longer appeal the verdict. The case will be referred to international institutions for consideration.

== Calls to toughen the law ==
In 2022, United Poland called for tougher blasphemy laws in Poland, such as three-year jail terms for insulting church or interrupting mass.

In October 2022, they submitted a citizens' legislative initiative for the tougher blasphemy laws with close to 400,000 signatures to parliament.

== Repeal attempts ==
The law is controversial in Poland. Lawyers have noted that it is excessively vague, not stating what actions count as "offending religious feelings", leading some to call for repeal of the law. Opponents of the law say that it has a chilling effect on legitimate free speech and criticism of religion. It has been criticized for violating free speech by human rights watchdogs such as Article 19, Human Rights Watch, Freedom House, End Blasphemy Laws, and Amnesty International. The Council of Europe's Recommendation 1805 urges member states to repeal blasphemy laws. Anne Ramberg and Michael Kirby of the International Bar Association’s Human Rights Institute stated that the law was overbroad, conflicting with Article 19 of the International Covenant on Civil and Political Rights and Article 10 of the European Convention on Human Rights, and was used unfairly to target LGBT rights advocates.

In 2019, MP Krzysztof Mieszkowski of Modern submitted legislation that would have abolished the offense. Referencing Podleśna's arrest, he said that Article 196 "has become a political tool today" and was an "oppressive article that has repeatedly limited creative freedom". Robert Biedroń, leader of Spring, said that his party aims to repeal the offense if elected. Biedroń added that the law and arrest of Podleśna made Poland internationally "famous for the idiotic attitude of today's rulers who go after artists and those who enjoy freedom of speech".

== See also ==
- Censorship by religion
- Profaning a monument
- Offending religious feelings (Philippines)
