= Benjamin Imeh =

Nigerian footballer

Personal information
- Full name: Benjamin Imeh
- Date of birth: 20 July 1982 (age 44)
- Place of birth: Lagos, Nigeria
- Height: 1.82 m (6 ft 0 in)
- Position: Striker

Senior career*
Years	Team	Apps	(Gls)
2004	Enyimba International		
2004–2005	Polonia Warsaw	22	(2)
2005	Arka Gdynia	7	(0)
2006	Zawisza Bydgoszcz (2)	31	(5)
2007–2008	Śląsk Wrocław	39	(6)
2008–2009	Tur Turek	22	(4)
2009–2010	Dolcan Ząbki	24	(2)
2011–2012	Zawisza Bydgoszcz	18	(6)
2012	Czarni Żagań	11	(0)
2012–2013	UKP Zielona Góra	21	(8)
2013	ŁKS Łęknica		
- * Club domestic league appearances and goals

Benjamin Imeh (born 20 July 1982) is a Nigerian former professional footballer who played as a striker. He has played in many Polish clubs.
