= Rainbow Madonna =

Adaptation of the icon of Black Madonna of Częstochowa

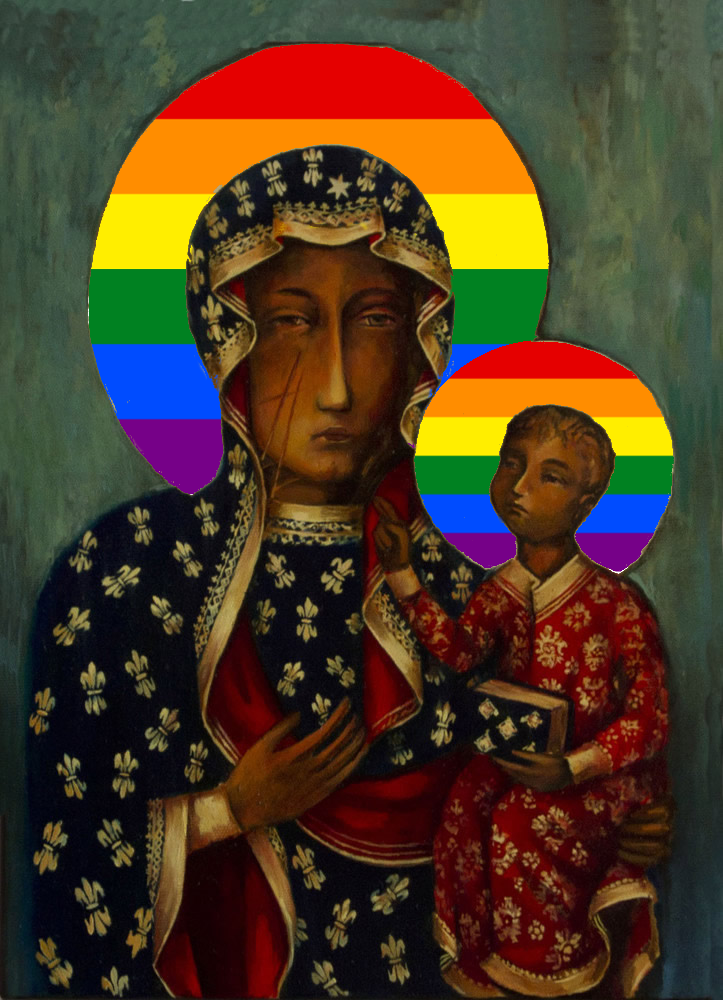
Rainbow Madonna, an adaptation of the Black Madonna of Częstochowa

The Rainbow Madonna is an adaptation of the icon of Black Madonna of Częstochowa, with the halos colored in rainbow colors of the LGBT movement. This modification of the painting, created by a civil rights activist Elżbieta Podleśna, is controversial in predominantly Roman Catholic Poland where the original icon is an object of veneration.

Following the events of 2019, the US Episcopal Church asked for permission to sell T-shirts bearing the Rainbow Madonna with proceeds allocated to the Polish transgender community.

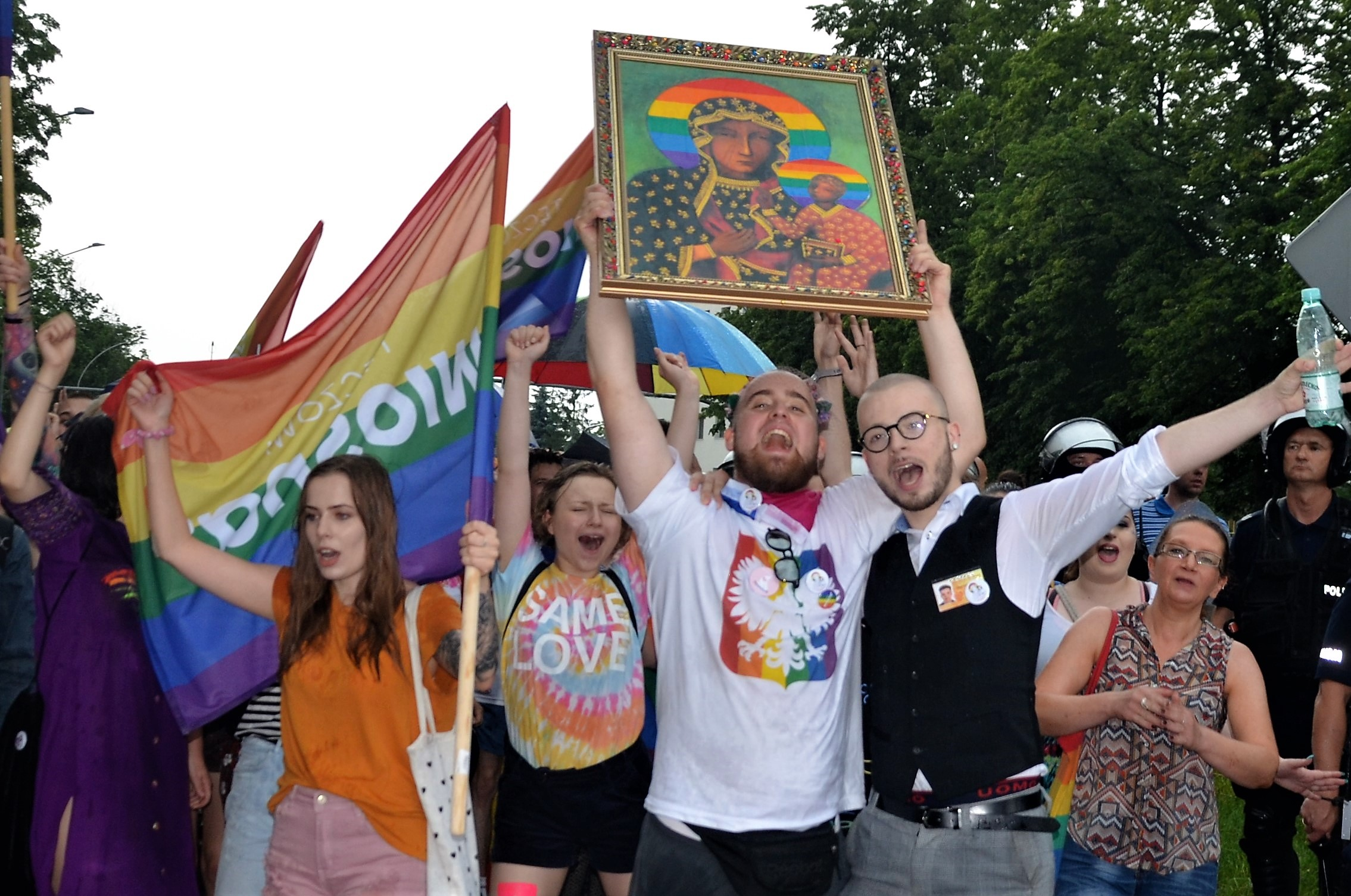
Rainbow Madonna held up by marchers of the 2019 Equality March in Częstochowa.

The Rainbow Madonna affair attracted significant attention in the Polish news cycle. A poll conducted by KANTAR concluded that the majority of Poles who identify themselves as religious are not offended by the rainbow Madonna, based on a representative sample of 1,006 Poles. Former prime minister Donald Tusk pointed out that there is already a similar Madonna's painting with a rainbow in the background by Hans Memling in St. Mary's Church, Gdańsk.
