= Elżbieta Podleśna =

Polish civil rights activist (born 1967/1968)

Elżbieta Podleśna (Polish pronunciation: [ɛlʐˈbjɛta pɔˈdlɛɕna]; born 1967 or 1968), also known as Elzbieta Podlesna, is a Polish civil rights activist. She was a leading person in the Polish Women's Strike protests in 2017 and 2018. She has also worked as a psychotherapist.

== Personal ==
Podleśna lives in Warsaw. While not a practicing Catholic, she believes in God.

== Activism ==
In 2017, she was one of the leading activists in Polish Women's Strike. Speaking on why she demonstrates against fascist groups, Podleśna said:

I cannot understand a situation in which a country in which concentration camps functioned, in which a huge proportion of society disappeared, in which our neighbours disappeared, can allow itself to have people marching with fascist symbols through its main streets in the capital city, who with their fists in the air call out for the death of enemies of the fatherland, for the death of anyone! I went up to those people and asked them: who are these enemies of the fatherland? Are you talking about me? And I heard – yes, we mean you, said directly into my eyes.

In November 2017, she was one of 14 women who attempted to stop the Polish independence day march in Warsaw. She was forcibly removed, and suffered spinal injuries forcing her to wear a medical corset.

In July 2018, she sprayed "PZPR" on the windows of the parliamentary office of Krzysztof Czabański in Wąbrzeźno, as well as political offices in Golub-Dobrzyń. On the street before the offices she spray painted "Time for judgement". Podleśna said she acted since she was terrified by the actions of the Law and Justice (PiS) party and the changes to the state system in Poland. initially, Podleśna was charged with the crime of "promoting a totalitarian system" as well as vandalism, however the totalitarianism charge was dropped. At trial, she pleaded guilty to the vandalism charge.

=== Rainbow Madonna ===
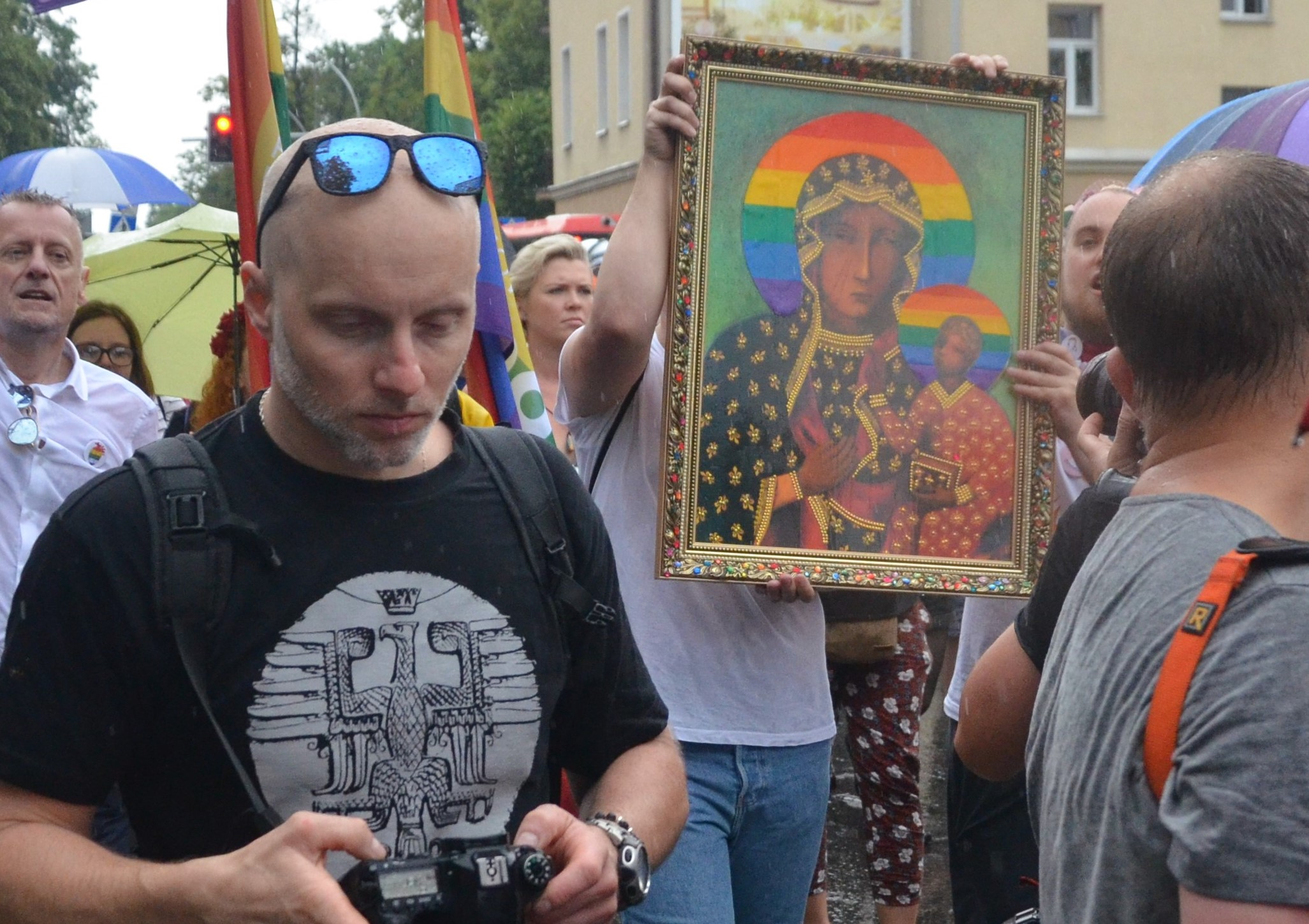
Black Madonna with a rainbow, 2019 Equality March in Częstochowa

In late April 2019, Podleśna placed images of Black Madonna of Częstochowa, with a rainbow halo, in Płock, including on the private territory of a church to protest an Easter display by the Catholic church that featured LGBT and gender as sins. In garbage cans throughout town she placed a list of bishops who allegedly protected priests accused of sexual abuses. Speaking of her motivation, Podleśna said:

"Nobody should be excluded from society. Sexual orientation is not a sin or a crime and the Holy Mother would protect such people from the Church and from priests who think it is okay to condemn others."

— Elżbieta Podleśna

In May 2019, after she returned from an Amnesty International advocacy tour, she was arrested by police at 6 in the morning and had her apartment searched. At the police station, she was charged with offending religious feelings, a crime punishable with up to two years in prison, for profanation of the image. The arrest was condemned by Amnesty International and the Polish Helsinki Foundation for Human Rights. While the names of suspects are redacted under Polish law until the conclusion of proceedings, Podleśna revealed her name to the media.

Podleśna said she received death threats for her protest in Płock. According to Gabriela Rogowska, the arrest of Podleśna was designed to discourage further activity. Joachim Brudziński, the Polish Interior Minister and PiS party member, praised the arrest saying Podleśna's protest involved "the desecration of the image of Our Lady, which has been considered sacred by Poles for centuries". The Płock court ruled the arrest was legal, though unreasonable.

Following the events, the US Episcopal Church asked for permission to sell T-shirts bearing the Rainbow Madonna with proceeds allocated to the Polish transgender community.
