= 2020–2021 women's strike protests in Poland =

Anti-government protests triggered by tightening of abortion law

2020–2021 Women's strike protests in Poland
- Women's Strike (Polish: Strajk Kobiet); Part of the Polish constitutional crisis
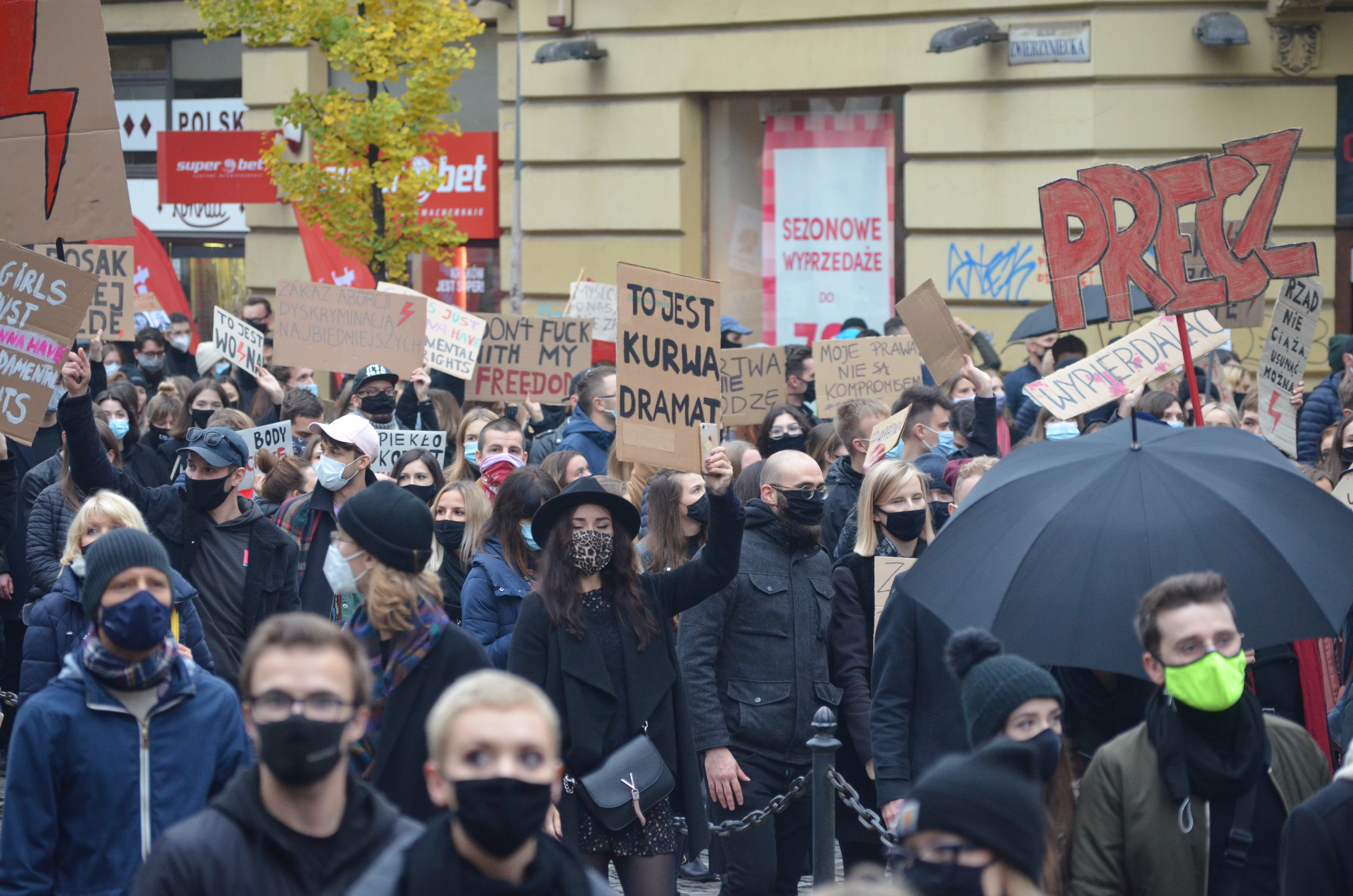
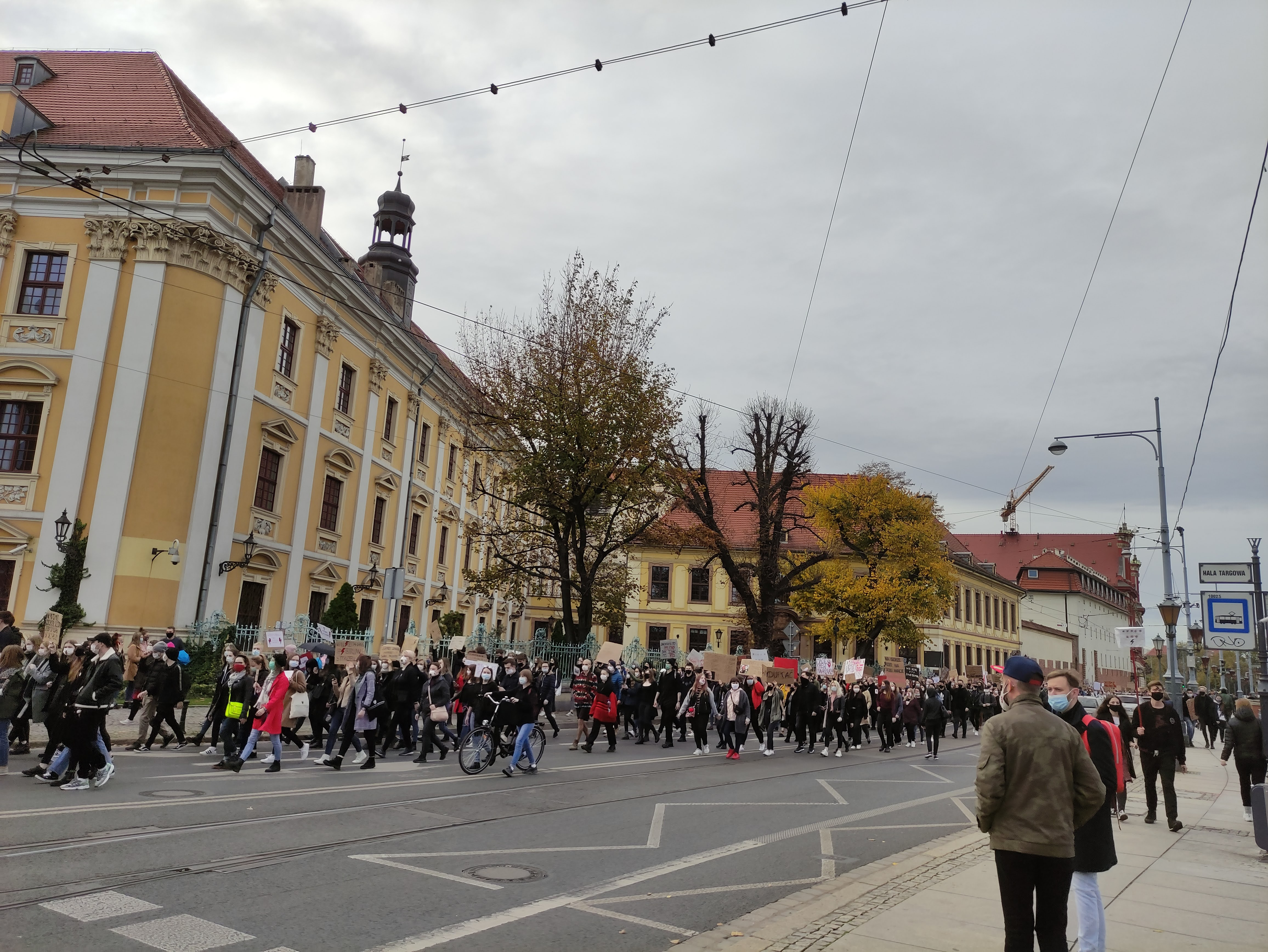
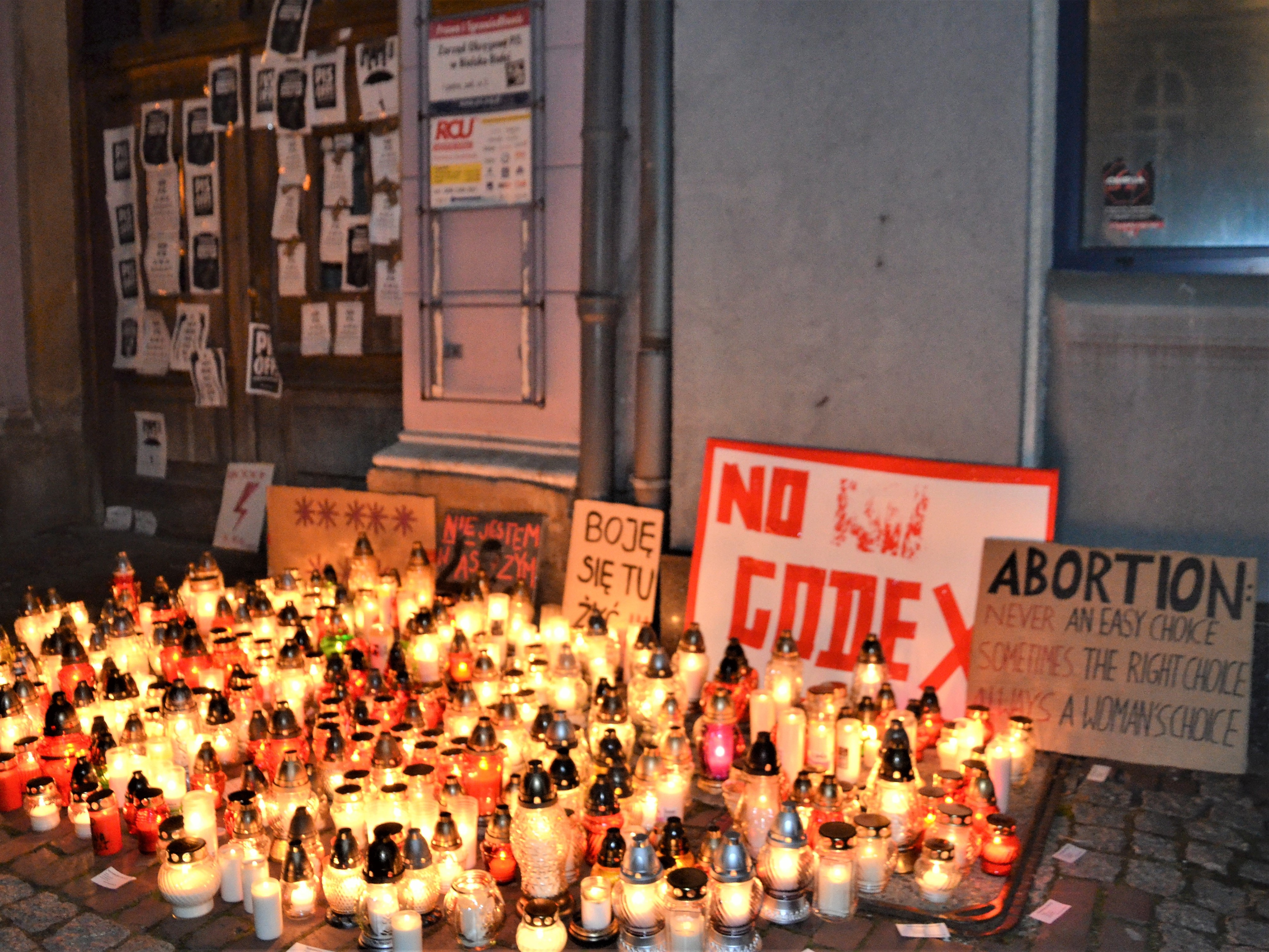
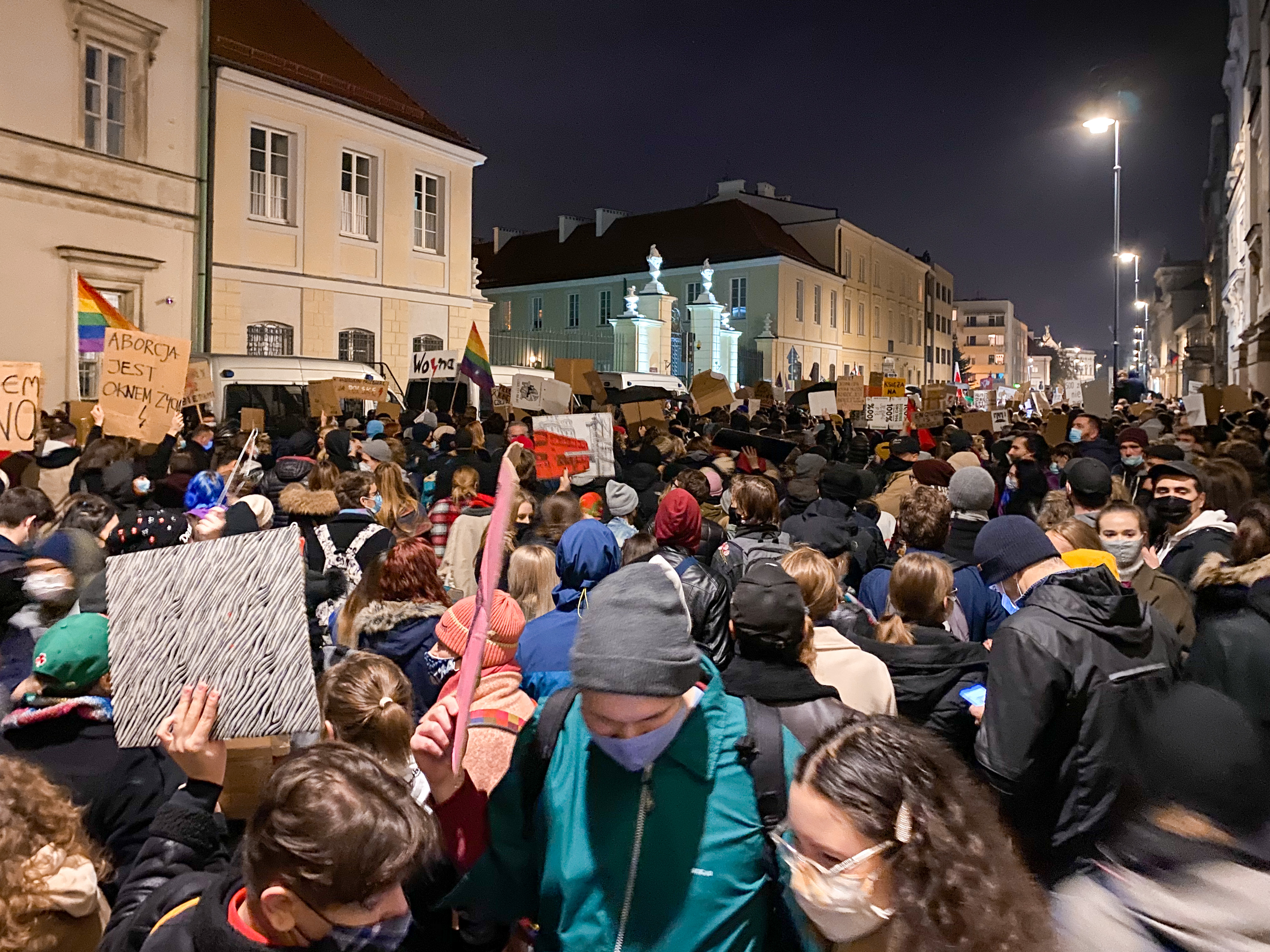
- Clockwise starting from top: protest in Kraków, protest in Bielsko-Biała, protest symbol, protest in Miodowa, protest in Wrocław.
- Date: 22 October 2020 – 27 January 2021
- Location: Poland
- Caused by: The Constitutional Tribunal's decision finding abortion in cases of "disability or incurable illness" to be unconstitutional in the country
- Goals: Revocation of the judgement of the Constitutional Tribunal or the removal of most abortion restrictions
- Methods: Demonstrations, marches, graffiti, leaflet drop, street blockades, street dance protests, strike, vandalism
- Result: Popularity of the government decreased; The verdict stayed in place

Parties
Abortion ban proponents: Law enforcement: City Guard; Police; Police Prevention Units; Independent Counter-Terrorist Units of the Police "BOA"; Internal Security Agency; Polish Armed Forces; Military Gendarmerie; Institutions: Constitutional Tribunal; Episcopal Conference of Poland; National Broadcasting Council; Political parties: United Right; Law and Justice; United Poland; Confederation Liberty and Independence; National Movement; Activist groups: Ordo Iuris; Fidei Defensor; Life and Family Foundation; Political groups: National Radical Camp; All-Polish Youth; Camp of Great Poland; National Guard; Falanga; Media: Radio Maryja; TV Trwam; Telewizja Polska; Polskie Radio; Nasz Dziennik; Telewizja Republika; Gazeta Polska; Do Rzeczy; Sieci; Najwyższy Czas!	Abortion ban opponents: Lead organisations: All-Poland Women's Strike; Political parties: ---- National; The Left; Left Together; New Left; Spring; Polish Socialist Party; 22px Polish Communist Party; Civic Coalition; 22px Polish Initiative; The Greens International European; European United Left–Nordic Green Left; European People's Party; Greens–European Free Alliance; Renew Europe; Progressive Alliance of Socialists and Democrats National European; Enhedslisten; Political groups: Silesian Autonomy Movement; Activist groups: Campaign Against Homophobia; Abortion Dream Team; Women on Web; Doctors for Women; Antifascist Coalition; Trade unions: Workers' Initiative; WZZ August '80; NGOs: Federation for the rights of Women and Family Planning; Women's Rights Centre; Greenpeace; Amnesty International Poland; Stefan Batory Foundation; Helsinki Foundation for Human Rights; Media: Gazeta.pl; Gazeta Wyborcza; Krytyka Polityczna; NaTemat.pl; Newsweek Polska; OKO.press; Radio Tok FM; Businesses: mBank; E.Wedel; Bar Wieczorny (Mokotów); Lukullus; Pan Tu Nie Stał; Resibo; Moye; MLE Collection; Elementy; LeBrand; MOIÉL; Netguru; Kubota; Bobby Burger; Green Caffe Nero

Lead figures
Politicians: Andrzej Duda; Mariusz Błaszczak; Mateusz Morawiecki; Jarosław Kaczyński; Antoni Macierewicz; Przemysław Czarnek; Zbigniew Ziobro; Robert Winnicki; Krzysztof Bosak; Judicial figures: Bogdan Święczkowski; Julia Przyłębska; Krystyna Pawłowicz; Religious figures: Tadeusz Rydzyk; Stanisław Gądecki; Leszek Gęsiak; Activists: Kaja Godek; Ziemowit Przebitkowski; Robert Bąkiewicz; Bartosz Bekier; Others: gen. dyw. Tomasz Połuch	Activists: Marta Lempart; Klementyna Suchanow; Lana Dadu; Politicians: Barbara Nowacka; Urszula Zielińska; Agnieszka Dziemianowicz-Bąk; Joanna Scheuring-Wielgus; Anna Maria Żukowska; Daria Gosek-Popiołek; Magdalena Biejat; Marcelina Zawisza; Adrian Zandberg; Maciej Konieczny; Robert Biedroń; Krzysztof Śmiszek; Krzysztof Gawkowski

Number
Over 180,000 people	Over 430,000 people

Casualties and losses
Over 200 injured 0 arrested	Over 1,000 injured Over 3,000 arrested

The 2020–2021 women's strike protests in Poland, commonly called the Women's Strike (Polish: Strajk Kobiet), were anti-government demonstrations and protests in Poland that began on 22 October 2020, in reaction to a ruling of the Constitutional Tribunal, mainly consisting of judges who were appointed by the ruling Law and Justice (Polish: Prawo i Sprawiedliwość, PiS) dominated United Right, which tightened the law on abortion in Poland. The ruling made almost all cases of abortion illegal, including those cases in which the foetus had a severe and permanent disability, or an incurable and life-threatening disease. All-Poland Women's Strike was charged by the authorities for having illegally organised the protests.

On the evening of 22 October 2020, a wave of mass protests in opposition to the ruling commenced. In the biggest protest in the country since the end of the People's Republic during the revolutions of 1989, protesters opposed the interference of the Roman Catholic Church in public matters, and opposed the domination of all three branches of government by the ruling coalition.

== Constitutional Tribunal abortion case ==
=== Background ===
On 7 January 1993, the Polish parliament passed the Law on Family Planning forbidding abortion, except if (1) the pregnancy poses a risk to the mother's life, (2) it is the result of a crime, or (3) there is a foetal impairment. In 1997, the Constitutional Tribunal headed by Andrzej Zoll ruled abortion on social grounds unconstitutional.

During the mid-2010s, about 80,000–200,000 Polish women carried out abortions (whether legal or illegal) per year according to the Federation for Women and Family Planning, or 8,000–13,000 according to the Polish Association of Defenders of Human Life. In the 2010s, about a quarter of all Polish women had terminated a pregnancy, according to Public Opinion Research Center in 2013, and Federation for Women and Family Planning in 2016. Abortion rates around the world ranged from about 10 to 40 per year per 1000 women aged 15–44 in the 2000s, "in all regions of the world, regardless of the status of abortion laws", according to Sedgh, Singh, Henshaw and Bankole in The Lancet. The number of legal abortions in Poland was about 1,000 legal abortions per year in the 2010s.

Because the Lower House elects constitutional judges, since the United Right took power in Poland in 2015, PiS' domination has expanded onto the judicial branch. This domination led to the 2015 Polish Constitutional Court crisis. The status of the tribunal continues to be disputed in February 2020 by some of its former judges and presidents.

In 2016, a citizen initiative was launched by anti-abortion movements such as Stop Aborcji [Stop Abortion] to tighten restrictions on abortions. It collected 830,000 signatures, forcing the Polish Parliament to discuss it. As the bill advanced further in parliamentary discussions, the All-Poland Women's Strike launched a protest movement branded "Black Protest" that attracted international coverage. After a few days, the PiS government let the bill die in committee.

The anti-abortion groups then started to oppose the constitutionality of the existing abortion law. Following the 2019 election, 119 members of the newly elected Sejm, coming from the PiS, Confederation, and Polish Coalition parliamentary groups, submitted a referral to the Constitutional Tribunal on whether or not abortions of pregnancies unrelated to rape or not threatening the mother's life, which they call "eugenic", are constitutional. In July 2018, a wave of nonviolent demonstrations for 3 weeks against an abortion ban started and led to the withdrawal of the bill. In December 2019, a muzzle law was created and sparked popular and widespread street protests for 2–3 weeks until it was withdrawn.

The signatories argued that this provision violates Constitutional protections of human dignity (Article 30), the right to life (Article 38) or the prohibition against discrimination (Article 32). During the year, the Constitutional Tribunal heard or received arguments and legal interventions on the question, one of which the European branch of the American Center for Law and Justice planned to submit.

By 2020, fourteen of the Constitutional Tribunal's fifteen judges had been appointed by the Sejm since the 2015 return of Law and Justice to power. Its domination over all branches of power has created a political crisis that has led the European Commission to refer Poland to the European Court of Justice.

=== Ruling of unconstitutionality ===
In an 11–2 decision announced on 22 October 2020 and published on the next day, the Constitutional Tribunal ruled unconstitutional the provision of the 1993 Act permitting abortion when the fetus is predicted to have a "disability or incurable illness". The ruling found it violated the Constitutional protection of human dignity.

The ruling did not affect the other two cases of the existing law, meaning that pregnancy can still be terminated if (1) it is the result of a crime (rape or incest), or (2) the woman's life or health is at risk. In practice, the provision that was ruled unconstitutional represented the overwhelming majority of the 1,000 to 2,000 abortions legally done in Poland each year. In 2019, 1074 of the 1110 official abortions were, according to the Polish Ministry of Health, cases of fetal defects. Among these, 271 were for Down's syndrome without other anomalies, and 60 cases were for Patau syndrome or Edward's syndrome without other anomalies.

== Protests ==
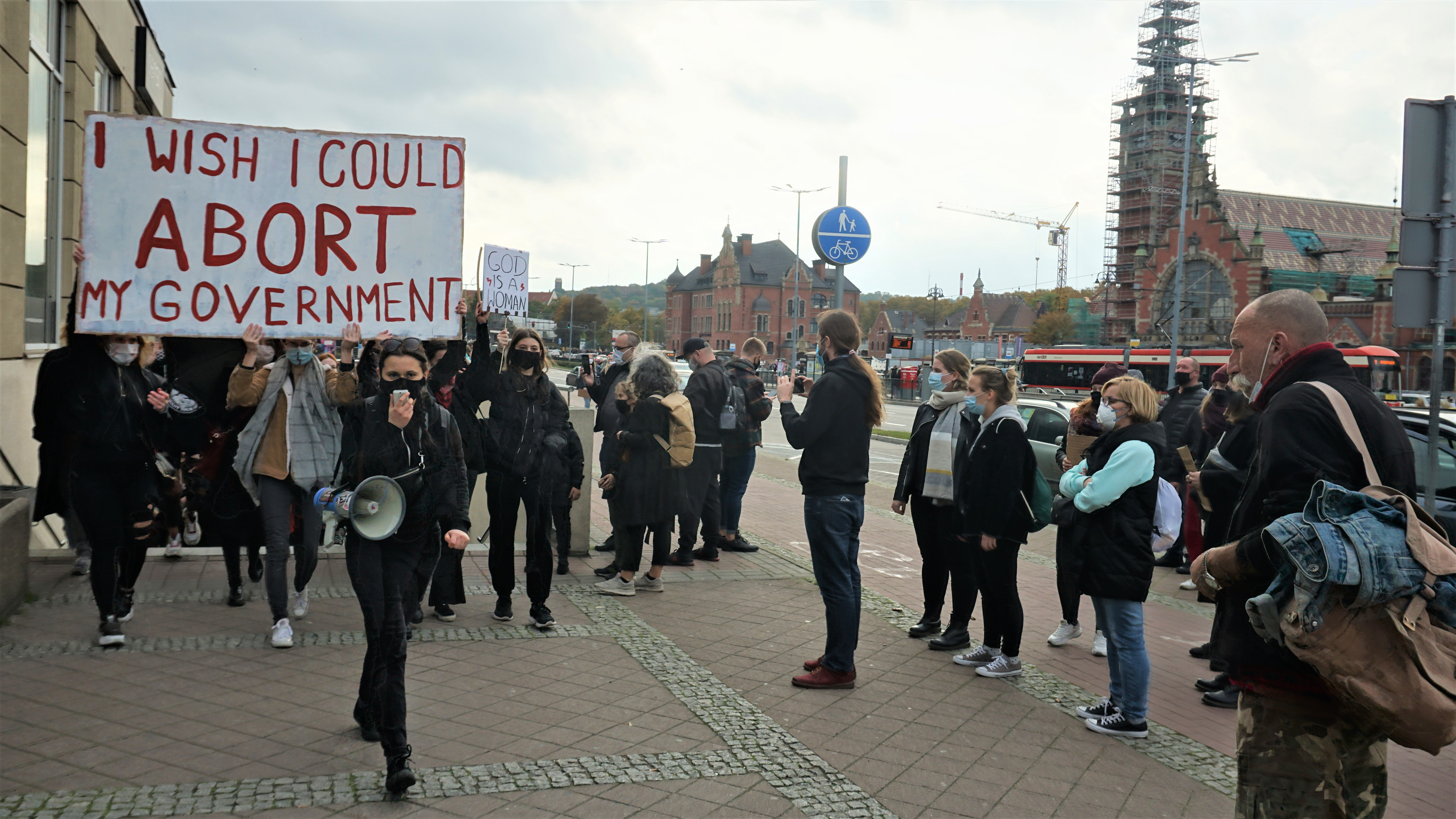
Protesters in Gdańsk, 24 October 2020, calling to "abort" the Polish government.

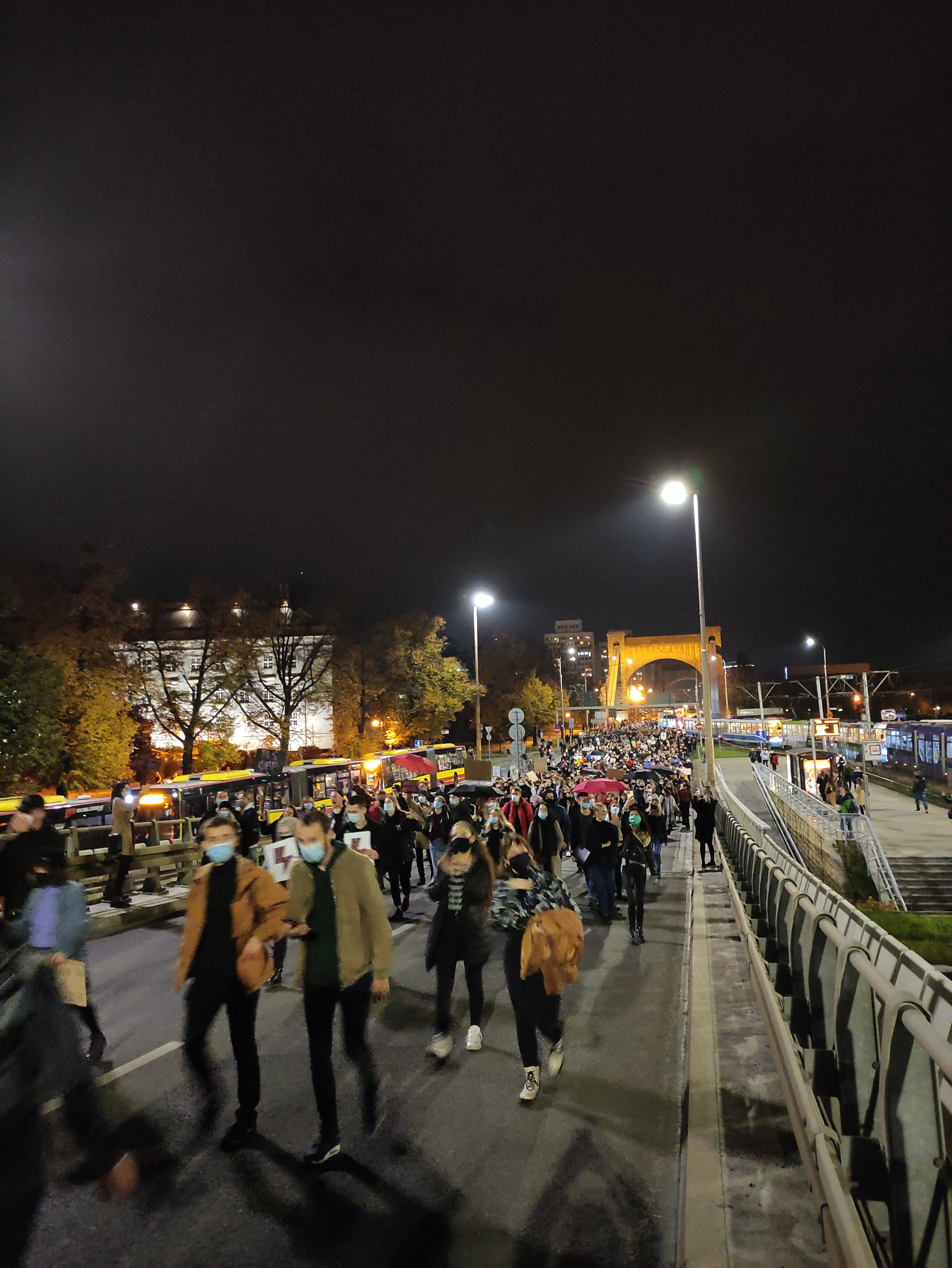
Blocked Grunwald Bridge in Wrocław, 26 October 2020

=== Timeline ===
==== October 2020 ====
Street protests began on 22 October 2020, following the ruling, and continued throughout the weekend. Women's Strike leaders Marta Lempart, Klementyna Suchanow and Agnieszka Czerederecka, who played a key role in the protests, were legally charged for their role in the protests.

Street protests took place in 60 Polish towns on the night of 23 October, and again on 24 October 2020. Protests took place in town centers, in front of PiS offices, and offices of religious administrations, as well as in front of the homes of both far-right activist Kaja Godek and PiS politician Krystyna Pawłowicz.

On 25 October 2020, protesters staged sit-ins in Catholic churches. They held banners, throwing leaflets with postulates and women's strike symbols, disrupting Sunday Mass in several cities, including Katowice and Poznań, and churches across the country were vandalized.

On 26 October 2020, protesters in 150 Polish towns and cities participated.

On 27 October 2020, the Women's Strike presented a list of demands: (1) fix the situations of the Constitutional Tribunal, the Supreme Court and the Ombudsman, (2) amend the budget – with more funds for health protection and assistance for entrepreneurs – (3) enact full women's rights – legal abortion, sex education, contraception – (4) stop the financing of the Catholic Church from the state budget, (5) end religious instruction in schools, and (6) enact the resignation of the government. Furthermore, they announced the creation of a Consultative Council, modelled on the Belarusian Coordination Council, a platform for dialogue to resolve the sociopolitical situation in Poland.

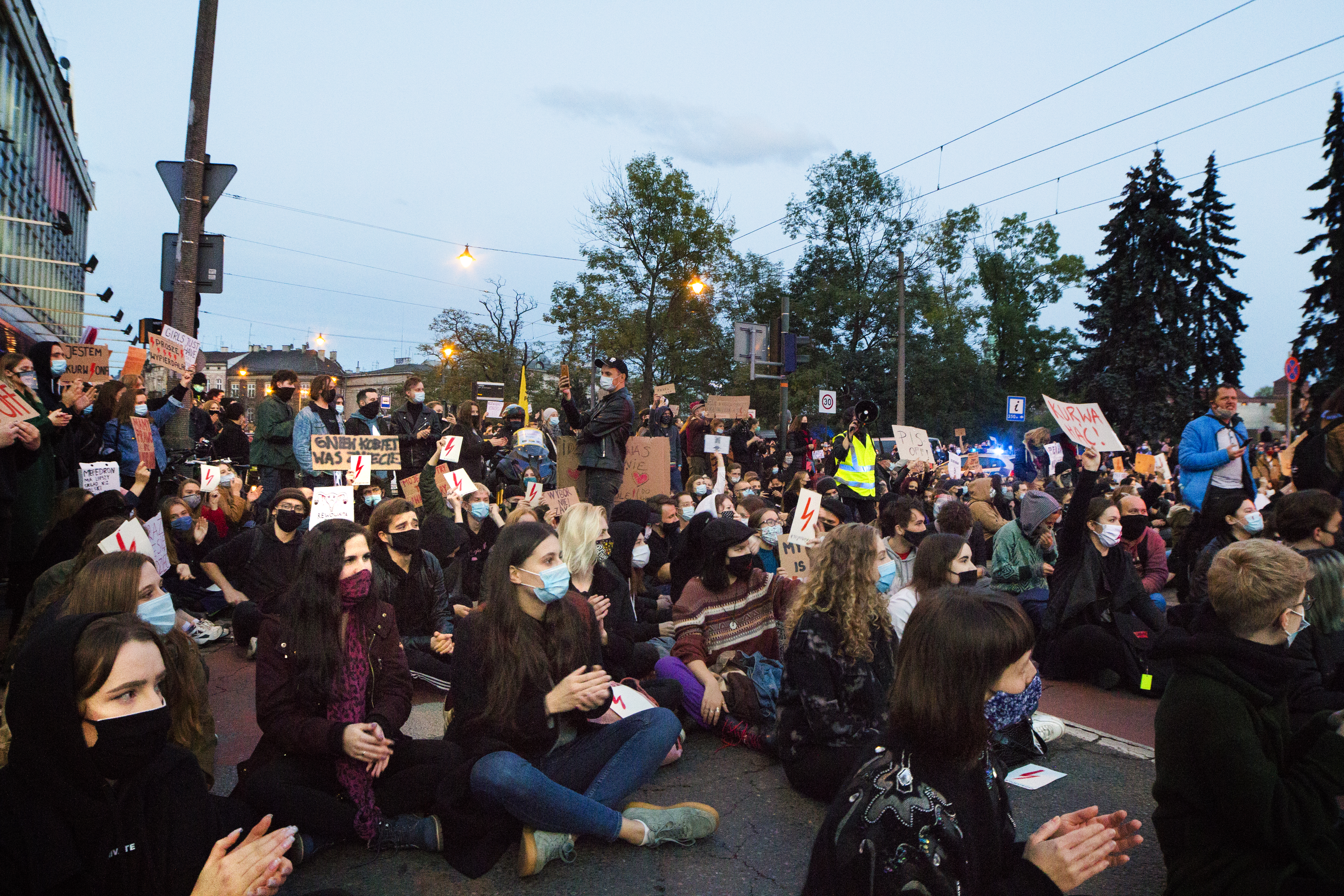
Road blockade in Kraków, 26 October 2020

On 28 October 2020, there was a nationwide women's strike under the slogan "I'm not going to work" (Polish: Nie idę do roboty). Many workplaces and offices allowed their employees to take part in the protest. Besides universities, local media including Gazeta.pl, Gazeta Wyborcza, NaTemat.pl, and Newsweek Polska engaged in the protest by publishing editorials supporting the movement. Companies, including mBank, also joined. Far-right and nationalist militias violently removed protesters from churches. According to the Chief Commander of Police Jarosław Szymczyk, approximately 430,000 people participated in 410 protests across the country.

On 30 October 2020, around 100,000 people participated in a mass protest in Warsaw. Zoliborz, a district where Jarosław Kaczyński lives, was blocked by the police who did not let the protest reach his house.

==== November 2020 ====
On 1 November 2020, many protests were related to the Prime Minister's decision to close cemeteries from 31 October to 2 November 2020, which affected flower producers and sellers (All Saints Day was observed that weekend). Flowers and candles were placed under PiS offices all over Poland. On November 2, the protests took place, among others, in Wroclaw.

On 3 November 2020, further demonstrations took place, some in reference to the announcement by the Minister of Education and Science, Przemysław Czarnek, concerning the consequences for teachers who were to encourage their students to participate in the protests. In Warsaw, the police intervened against two artists who undressed in front of the Presidential Palace as a form of support for the protesting women.

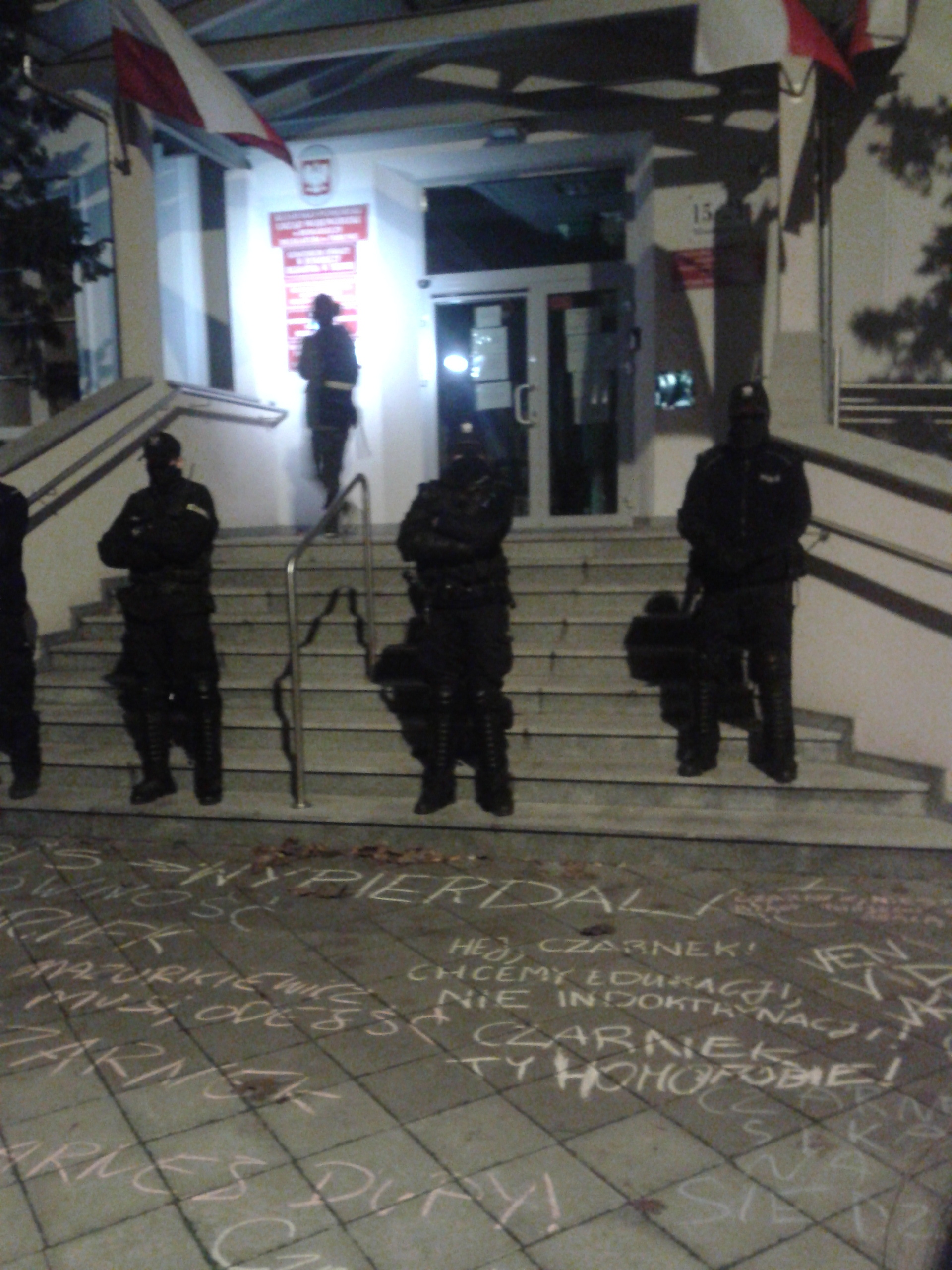
9 November 2020 protest against Minister of Science and Education Przemysław Czarnek at the local education administrative office in Toruń.

On 6 November 2020, a big OSK protest took place in Zakopane.

On 8 November 2020, the 15-metre-high steel Christian cross on the Great Giewont peak in the Tatra Mountains was briefly covered by a banner showing the OSK red lightning symbol and the text "Domestic violence is not a tradition." The banner almost completely covered the cross. Images of the cross covered by the banner were distributed on the Internet. According to Gazeta Krakowska, the context of the images was that the Zakopane city council was the only local council that had not introduced legislative actions against domestic violence over the previous ten years, and it justified its decision on the grounds that the legislation would violate family traditions. In mid-2020, the cross had previously been used to display an election poster for Andrzej Duda and a rainbow flag representing LGBT rights.

The 9 November 2020, protests in Warsaw included slogans against the new Minister of Science and Education, Przemysław Czarnek, like "We want education not indoctrination" and "Czarnek, go to hell" (Polish: Czarnek, idź do diabła, lit. 'Czarnek, go to the devil'). Cat and mouse games between police trying to block the protest and protesters changing paths occurred throughout the evening. The protesters called for Czarnek to resign, for the striking Teachers' demands to be fulfilled, for university autonomy, for "accurate" (Polish: rzetelnej) sexual education, for the removal of sexist, anti-LGBT and racist content from schoolbooks and the removal of religious instruction from schools. Several participants whose identities were checked by police refused to pay on-the-spot fines and one woman was thrown on the ground by police. One protester, Gabriela, spoke in defence of a woman who was being interviewed by police. Gabriela stated to a police officer, "You're not behaving like a policeman!" and she "heatedly" discussed the situation of Polish police with him. She was detained overnight and charged under Article 226 of the Polish criminal code for insulting a police officer, and under Article 224 para. 2 for using "violence or a threat" to prevent a police officer from carrying out lawful action.

On 18 November 2020, 3000 police officers surrounded the Sejm, which was starting a new sitting, in preparation for an expected protest. OKO.press interpreted the high number of police to Jarosław Kaczyński's personal "trauma" induced by December 2016 protests at the Sejm, to Kaczyński's anger at police insufficiently controlling the October–November 2020 protests, and to senior police officials Jarosław Szymczyk and Paweł Dobodziej worrying about keeping their jobs despite Kaczyński's anger with the police. The police cordon around the Sejm made it difficult for members to access the building. According to member of Sejm Krzysztof Gawkowski, police used force against the deputy Speaker Włodzimierz Czarzasty.

The protest started at 18:00 local time near the Sejm. Protesters moved from the Sejm to Three Crosses Square, moved along nearby streets in central Warsaw and tried to regroup back at Three Crosses Square. Marta Lempart of OSK described the police as "Kaczyński's private security force, pretending to be police". The protesters continued to the Telewizja Polska (TVP) headquarters at 17 Woronicza Street. Slogans included "Let's block TV-PiS", "Minsk, Warsaw, same situation" and "Polish police are protecting a dictator". By 21:00, five protesters had been detained on Piękna Street near the Sejm.

At 21:40, the police kettled the protesters in front of TVP headquarters. Member of Sejm Marcelina Zawisza unsuccessfully tried to persuade police to allow a mother with her child, passers-by, trapped in the cordon by chance, to leave safely. The police refused, stating, "No, because no." Police refused to say who was the officer in charge of the police action. Maciek Piasecki stated that police started using force "completely unprovoked". The protesters called for the police to allow them to leave the kettle. Police "blindly" pepper-sprayed the protesters. Plainclothes police officers attacked a group of protesters and beat a woman lying on the ground with an expandable baton. Plainclothes officers put on police arm bands and "hid behind" uniformed officers. Member of Sejm Magdalena Biejat showed her Sejm identity card and requested police to stop using violence. A police officer pepper-sprayed her in response. Franciszek Sterczewski and Monika Rosa, members of Sejm, were present. The police required protesters to go through identity controls in order to exit the kettle.

On 19 November 2020, a solidarity demonstration for a 25-year-old woman, Iza, detained during the protests in late October, started at 11:00 in front of the Warsaw Regional Court. A letter from Iza was read to the crowd. Police kettled 20 of the protesters. The police grabbed a protester, who they threw to the ground, dragged over steps and pushed into a police van. Natalia Broniarczyk of Aborcyjny Dream Team described the detention as "very brutal" including "pushing to the ground with knees". Protesters outside the kettle sat on the street to block the police van. Police brutally removed the sitting protesters, and detained around twelve. Members of Sejm Klaudia Jachira Monika Falej, present at the events, accused the police of escalating the conflict. A third set of detentions occurred when protesters blocked an anti-abortion bus. By 15:00, demonstrators shifted to Żytnia Street in a solidarity demonstration for the newly detained protesters.

On 23 November 2020, protests took place in Warsaw and around Poland, in Biały Dunajec, Bydgoszcz, Gdańsk, Gdynia, Lublin, Nowy Dwór Gdański, Podhale, Toruń, Wejherowo and Wrocław. In Warsaw, a protest against Science and Education Minister Przemysław Czarnek took place, with slogans including "Free abortion, free education" and "Minsk, Warsaw, same situation". Photojournalist and war correspondent Agata Grzybowska was detained during the protest while showing her journalist's identification. Journalists around her loudly informed police that she was a journalist. Police later alleged that Grzybowska had assaulted a police officer. A police van deliberately ran over the hand of a protester blocking the path of the van, breaking his bones. Grzybowska was released at 19:00, two hours after her detention. By 02:00 on 24 November 400 journalists and photojournalists had signed an appeal calling for police to respect the freedom of the press and stop harassing journalists.

==== December 2020 ====
On 13 December, protesters, including members of Sejm, marched in Warsaw from Roman Dmowski Roundabout at around midday and arriving at Kaczyński's house in Żoliborz at around 14:20 CET. The protesters ran and threaded through Warsaw streets and parks, frequently changing their route, bypassing a massive police presence of cordons and police vans.

==== January 2021 ====
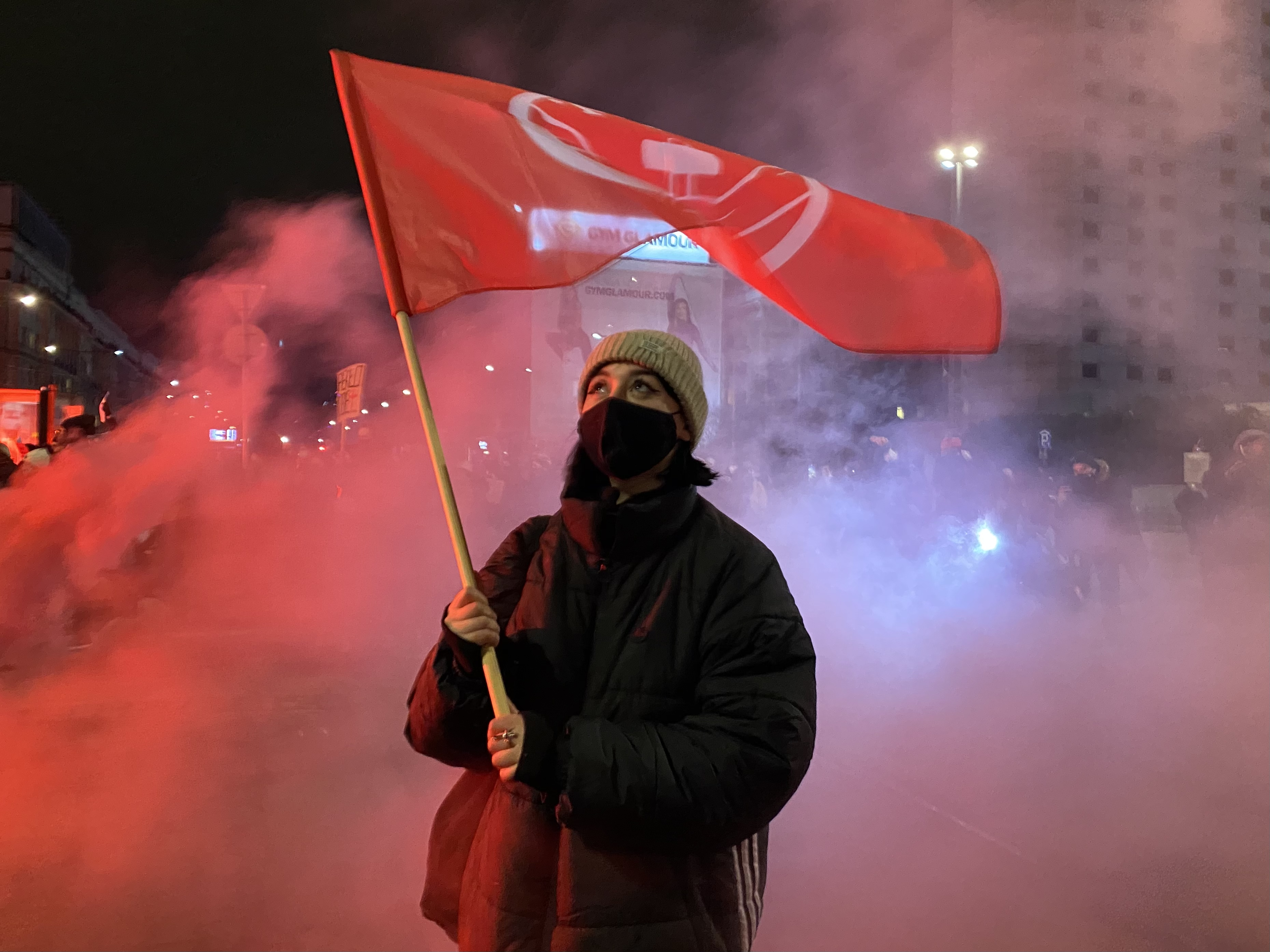
Protester on Dmowski Roundabout in Warsaw, with the flag of the Polish Socialist Party, 27 January 2021

Street protests restarted on the evening of 27 January 2021, hours after the Constitutional Tribunal ruling was formally published in Dziennik Ustaw. Protesters in Warsaw gathered in front of the Constitutional Tribunal on Szucha Avenue, then marched to the PiS headquarters. The street was cordoned off by police. The protesters returned to Dmowski Roundabout, where the protest ended. The mayor of Warsaw, Rafał Trzaskowski, described the publication of the Tribunal ruling as "against the will of Poles".

=== Aims ===
The initial aims of the protests were an expression of anger against the Constitutional Tribunal ruling and the defence of women's rights. These extended to a broader range of goals over the following days. On 27 October, the All-Poland Women's Strike summarised the aims from banners, slogans and protesters' discussions, stating that the aims of the protests included a return to the rule of law. Further demands included full women's rights, legal abortion, sex education, and contraception; interpreting the Constitutional Tribunal's ruling as stated by the president of the tribunal Julia Przyłębska, as her personal testimony instead of a legal ruling; "the return of a real (independent) Constitutional Tribunal"; "the return to a neutral (independent) Supreme Court of Poland that is not controlled by PiS"; "the appointment of a real (independent) Polish Ombudsman, to succeed Adam Bodnar, who reached the end of his term"; and the overthrow of the rule of the Law and Justice party.

On 1 November 2020, the All-Poland Women's Strike created the Consultative Council, to develop strategies to implement the aims of the protesters. The Council introduced its 20 members and their demands, which included abortion and full women's rights, LGBTQ+ community rights, removal of religion from schools, dealing with climate catastrophe, as well as taking care of animal rights, education, and health service. The Council demanded that money be redirected from church and PiS to health care, and demand that "the government increases healthcare funding to 10 percent within a week."

=== Foreign solidarity ===
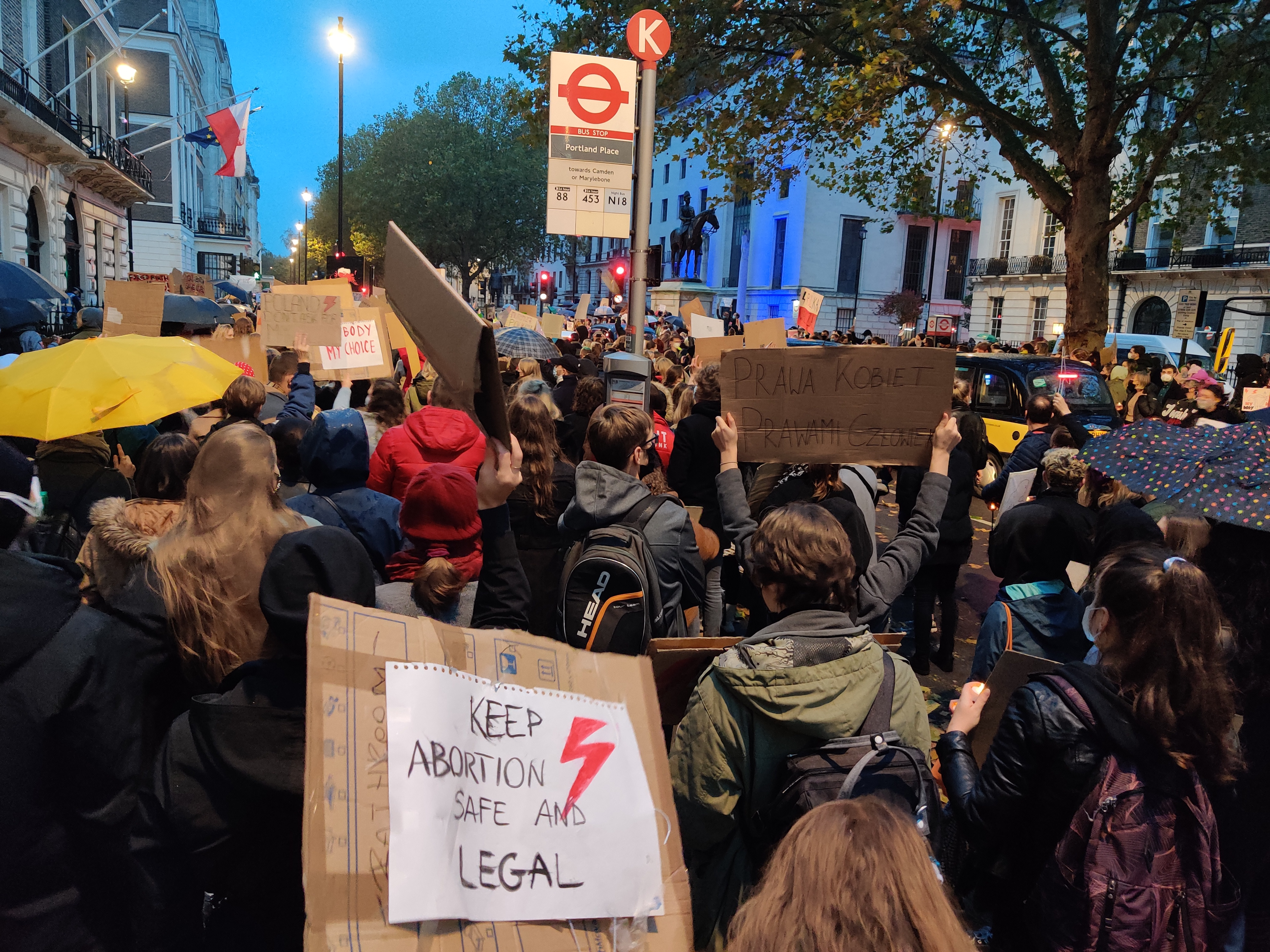
Protest in front of the Polish Embassy in London

Demonstrations against the ruling and in support of the protests were organised in Amsterdam, Athens, Belgrade, Berlin, Bochum, Bristol, Brussels, Budapest, Chicago, Dublin, Edinburgh, Glasgow (in Scotland there were 14 solidarity demonstrations in total), Gothenburg, Hamburg, Helsinki, Kyiv, Leeds, Leipzig, Lisbon, London, Luxembourg, Malmö, Manchester, Mexico City, Munich, Nicosia, Nottingham, Paris, Porto, Prague, Reykjavík, Sheffield, Sydney, Stockholm, Tartu, Tel Aviv, Tokyo, Vienna, and others.

=== Tactics ===
==== Offensive language ====
One of the major tactics used by protesters was to use a wide variety of slogans using socially offensive language. The slogans from the first week of protests were deliberately vulgar, with protesters justifying the vulgarity as a response to the government and the Catholic Church's alleged lack of respect for women.

Publicist Piotr Pacewicz of OKO.press collected and classified slogans into categories. His classification included: women's rights – "My body is not a coffin" (Polish: Moje ciało to nie trumna); political institutions altogether – "The government is not a pregnancy, it can be removed" (Polish: Rząd nie ciąża, da się usunąć); Jarosław Kaczyński himself – "Jarek, you shat yourself, get up" (Polish: Jarek posrałeś się, wstawaj), "The cat can stay, the government get the fuck out" (Polish: Kot może zostać, rząd może wypierdalać, a reference to Jarosław Kaczyński's cat); the Catholic Church – "Fuck yourself in your own organs" (Polish: Napierdalajcie we własne organy); and PiS itself – "Fuck PiS" (Polish: Jebać PiS); along with a humorous mix of politeness and vulgarity – "Could you please fuck off" (Polish: Bardzo proszę wypierdalać).

==== Citizens' legislative initiative ====
On 12 November 2020, twelve women's groups and women members of the Sejm created a committee to write a citizens' legislative initiative Legal abortion without compromises (Polish: Legalna aborcja bez kompromisów). Women parliamentarians included in the committee included Wanda Nowicka, Katarzyna Kotula, Katarzyna Ueberhan, Monika Falej, Katarzyna Kretkowska, Joanna Senyszyn, Magdalena Biejat, Marcelina Zawisza and Joanna Scheuring–Wielgus. The aim was that the draft bill should legalise and decriminalise abortion. As of 12 November, the limiting week within pregnancy to which abortion would be allowed remained open to debate.

Natalia Broniarczyk of Abortion Dream Team stated that it was "finally time to trust [women]" who "took a responsible decision concerning their health and life" and that no restrictive anti-abortion law would prevent women from making their own decisions. Marta Lempart of OSK stated that it was possible to falsely claim that anti-abortion law prevented abortions, to pretend that the cost of abortions was unknown, and to pretend to have no friends of friends who had had abortions, but that the Catholic Church and right-wing politicians were responsible for the lies, while the women activists supported reality.

==== Strike plan ====
On 11 November 2020, Klementyna Suchanow of OSK stated that the government had failed to increase the health budget to ten percent of the GDP within the Consultative Council's one-week deadline. To obtain the increase in the health budget to ten percent, a general strike was under negotiation for early December with the medical community. Suchanow described the situation in the health services as "dramatic", "nearing armageddon", and "falling apart".

== Government response ==
The national public prosecutor Bogdan Święczkowski stated that the protest organizers might face charges of "causing danger to the life and health of many people by causing an epidemiological threat". Education minister Przemysław Czarnek also threatened to cut the funding of universities which supported the protests.

After two team members of the Polish Institute in Tel Aviv took part in protests and held signs reading "Jews also fuck PiS" (Polish: "Żydzi też jebią PiS"), ambassador Marek Magierowski gave them the option of either resigning or facing disciplinary action.

=== Jarosław Kaczyński's statement ===
Jarosław Kaczyński, who is considered Poland's de facto leader (he previously held the posts of Prime Minister and president of PiS, then Deputy Prime Minister), issued on 27 October a statement in which he called for the "defence of the churches, Poland and patriotism", stated that "the authorities have the full right to oppose these protests" and called "all PiS members and our supporters" to "defend [the churches] at all costs" (Polish: Musimy ich bronić za każdą cenę). Kaczyński also said that the protest were in violation COVID-19 restrictions in place. Kaczyński's speech was compared to Wojciech Jaruzelski's address declaring martial law in 1981. Many commentators and journalists interpreted the speech as a call for civil war and a declaration of war on society, based on Kaczyński's expression "at all costs".

=== President Andrzej Duda's statement ===
In an October 2020 interview with Polsat News, Andrzej Duda stated that he understands the women who protest and said that while he is opposed to "eugenic abortion", he thinks that work has to be done regarding situations in which fetal defects are lethal and that in this regard the right to choose should remain. He further stated that the physical defence of churches should be the role of the police and not counter-demonstrators.

=== Parliamentary response ===
In October 2020 the coalition partner of PiS, the Agreement party, published a statement calling for introducing precise legal provisions concerning the protection of what they referred to as an "unborn child" with Down syndrome and the mother's right to make decisions in "very rare cases of incurable lethal defects" of the foetus.

=== Bill proposal ===
On 30 October 2020, President Duda unveiled a bill prepared by his cabinet. He said "I am counting on a broad political consensus on this matter" and expected it to defuse the tensions. He explained that "after the enactment of this bill, there will still be three grounds for legal abortion in Polish law: [1] because of a threat to the life and health of the mother, [2] because of rape or incest and [3] because of severe and irreversible damage to the foetus which leads to the death of the child". The third case is detailed as such by the bill's draft: "Prenatal tests or other medical indications indicate a high probability that a child will be born dead or burdened with an incurable disease or defect leading inevitably and directly to the death of the child, regardless of the therapeutic measures applied."

=== Delayed publication ===
On 3 November 2020, the government announced that it intended to delay the publication and implementation of the controversial ruling. Warsaw University law professor Marcin Matczak called it "by far the worst option", and Anna Wójcik called it a "political decision", as Polish law requires judgements to be published in the Journal of Laws without delay. The Polish Government asked the Constitutional Tribunal a judicial opinion to help define the ruling exactly.

On 26 January 2021 the Polish Government published a communiqué explaining that, following the release of the Constitutional Tribunal's judicial opinion, both the ruling and the opinion would be published in the Dziennik Ustaw that day, with the new ban enforced the next day.

=== Military Gendarmerie ===
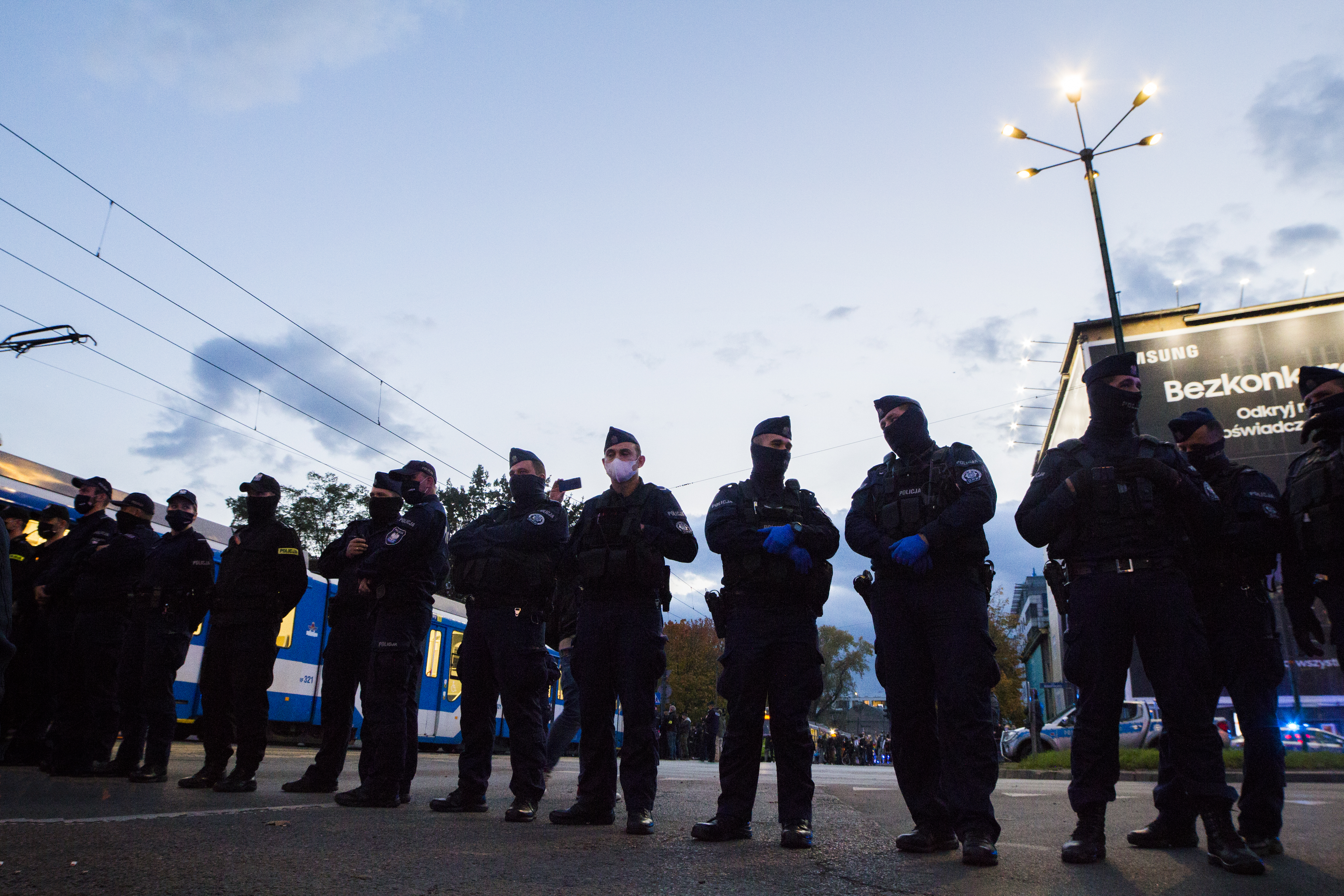
Police forces securing the road blockade in Kraków, 26 October

On 23 October 2020, the prime minister Mateusz Morawiecki issued an order for the Military Gendarmerie to help the civilian police in the "protection of safety and public order" starting from 28 October 2020 (a nationwide women's strike was scheduled for that day). The cited justification for the order was the COVID-19 pandemic in Poland. TVN24 commented that the order had to do with the protests. The Polish Ministry of Defence stated on Twitter that the Gendarmerie's policing role was "standard" and unrelated to the abortion rights protests.

On 30 October 2020, the Gendarmerie was deployed in front of government buildings and churches in Warsaw, including the Three Crosses Square, the palace of the Bishop of Warsaw, and the Holy Cross Church.

== Relations with the Catholic Church ==
=== Profanity and graffiti ===
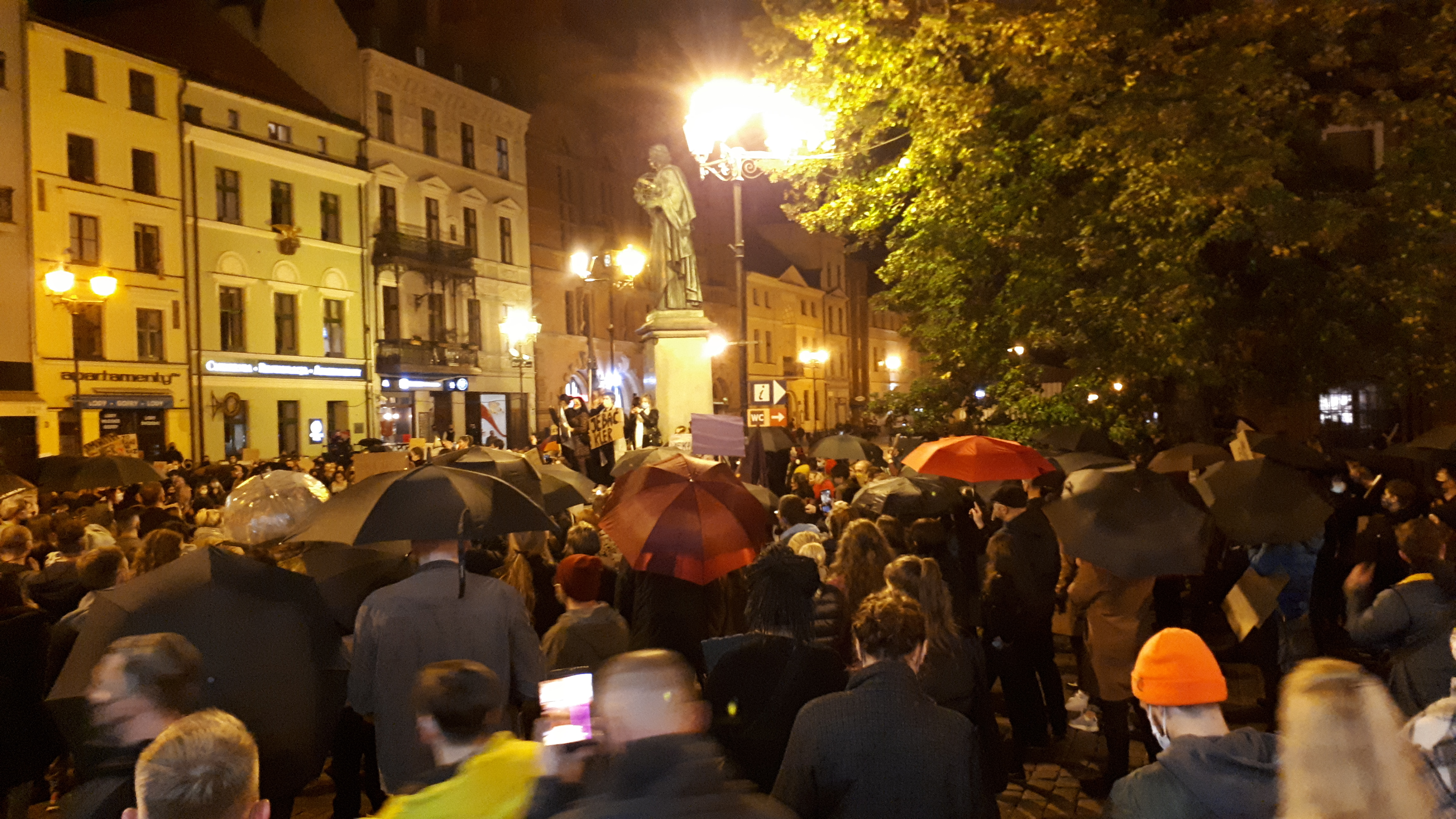
Protest in Toruń, 24 October 2020, with a banner stating "Fuck the clergy" (Polish: "jebać kler").

The protests included slogans with widespread use of the profanities "fuck" (Polish: jebać), and "fuck off" (Polish: wypierdalać), opposing the Catholic Church, holding up banners in churches, painting of graffiti on church and cathedral walls throughout the country, described as the "vandali[sing]" of churches by The New York Times (NYT), and disrupting Masses. NYT described the protests as breaking a "longstanding taboo against challenging the [Catholic] church". The Church itself has called for "respect for churches".

=== Apostasy ===
During the October protests, enquiries regarding the procedure for apostasy (deregistering from the Polish Catholic Church), which requires a personal visit to a parish priest increased in popularity. Web search engine queries showed high frequencies for "apostasy" (Polish: apostazja) and "how to apostatize" (Polish: jak dokonać apostazji). A Facebook event titled "Quit the church at [Christmas]" was followed by near to 5,000 people. National Geographic published a guide to the apostasy procedure and commented on the rapidly growing interest in apostasy in Poland. A spokesperson for Episcopal Conference of Poland (Episcopate), Paweł Rytel-Andrianik, described the 2016 Episcopate decree as a "decree on apostasy" that also allows returning to Church membership. Jacek Tabisz of the Polish Rationalists Association described the 2016 decree as easing the procedure since the previous procedure had required two witnesses. The Polish Rationalists Association had often been asked for help in finding witnesses.

== Repression and consequences ==
=== State institutions ===
Amnesty International stated on 29 October that protesters had "faced excessive use of force by police officers, and [had] been arbitrarily detained without access to lawyers" during the protests.

The authorities announced several consequences both for the protesters and their organizers:

- Minister of Education and Science Przemysław Czarnek announced the withdrawal of funds from fifteen universities in which "rector hours" (day-off) were announced for their students so that they could take part in the protests.
- National Prosecutor and First Deputy of Public Prosecutor General Bogdan Święczkowski the "right hand" of Zbigniew Ziobro prepared guidelines for regional prosecutor's offices with instructions on prosecuting participants and organizers of abortion protests. Demonstration participants may face up to 8 years in prison.
- National Broadcasting Council (KRRiT) urged the private channel TVN24 to stop using the wording "Trybunał Konstytucyjny Julii Przyłębskiej" (The Constitutional Tribunal of Julia Przyłębska) because of the alleged "harassment" of a judge of the tribunal. The Constitutional Tribunal ruling was given by Julia Przyłębska, president of the tribunal. She is a close friend of Jarosław Kaczyński.
- Adam Bodnar, the acting Polish Ombudsman, and TOK FM stated that there were censorship attempts and silencing of students supporting the protests, and possible disciplinary proceedings at the John Paul II Catholic University of Lublin.

=== Non-state agitators ===
Agitators identifying themselves with white armbands attacked protesters in the 30 October Warsaw protest. Former Minister and member of parliament Bartłomiej Sienkiewicz attempted to defend some of the protesters; he was pepper-sprayed at a distance of about 1.5 metres in his face by one of the fighters. Sienkiewicz described the fighters, who he described as neo-Nazis (Polish: naziole), being armed with batons and knives. Police were absent from the Rondo de Gaulle'a (roundabout) where the attack occurred. Sienkiewicz attributed encouragement of the fighters to Jarosław Kaczyński. Police later detained some of the fighters who attacked the protesters and published photos of some of the fighters' weapons.

== Public opinion ==
Attitude towards the ruling of the Constitutional Tribunal (28 October 2020, Kantar Public)
1. Do not support the ruling (73.0%)
2. Support the ruling (13.0%)
3. No opinion (14.0%)

Before the ruling:

- A February 2019 Ipsos poll in Poland found that 53% of Poles (57% of women, 49% of men) support the right to abortion-on-demand up to the 12th week of pregnancy, 35% are opposed (35% of women, 35% of men) and 7% (9% of women, 16% of men) had no opinion.
- An April 2019 Kantar poll in Poland found 58% of Poles supported the right to abortion-on-demand up to the 12th week of pregnancy, 35% opposed and 7% had no opinion.

After the ruling:

- A poll from 28 October 2020 found that 22% of Poles supported abortion-on-demand, 62% supported it only in certain cases, and 11% thought it should be completely illegal.
- On 28 October 2020, four polls were published in which respondents were asked about their support or opposition to the judgment of the Constitutional Tribunal:

- Kantar poll: 73% of responders did not support the ruling, 13% supported the ruling, and 14% had no opinion. In this same poll, 54% of voters supported the protests, 43% were against, 4% had no opinion.
- IBRiS poll: 66% did not support the ruling, 25% supported it, and 9% had no opinion. In this same poll, people were also asked about a possible referendum, with the result that 69% believed that a referendum should be held in Poland on the admissibility and conditions of allowing abortion, 24% were against, and 7% had no opinion.
- SW Research poll: 71% of responders did not support the ruling, 13% supported the ruling, and 16% had no opinion.
- Pollster poll: 64% of responders support the protests, 33% are against, and 3% have no opinion.

== See also ==
- Protests against Polish judiciary reforms
- Media Without Choice
