= Strajk Kobiet =

Strajk Kobiet (Polish for "Women's Strike) may refer to:

- October–November 2020 Polish protests
- All-Poland Women's Strike
