= Klementyna Suchanow =

Polish writer, editor, and activist

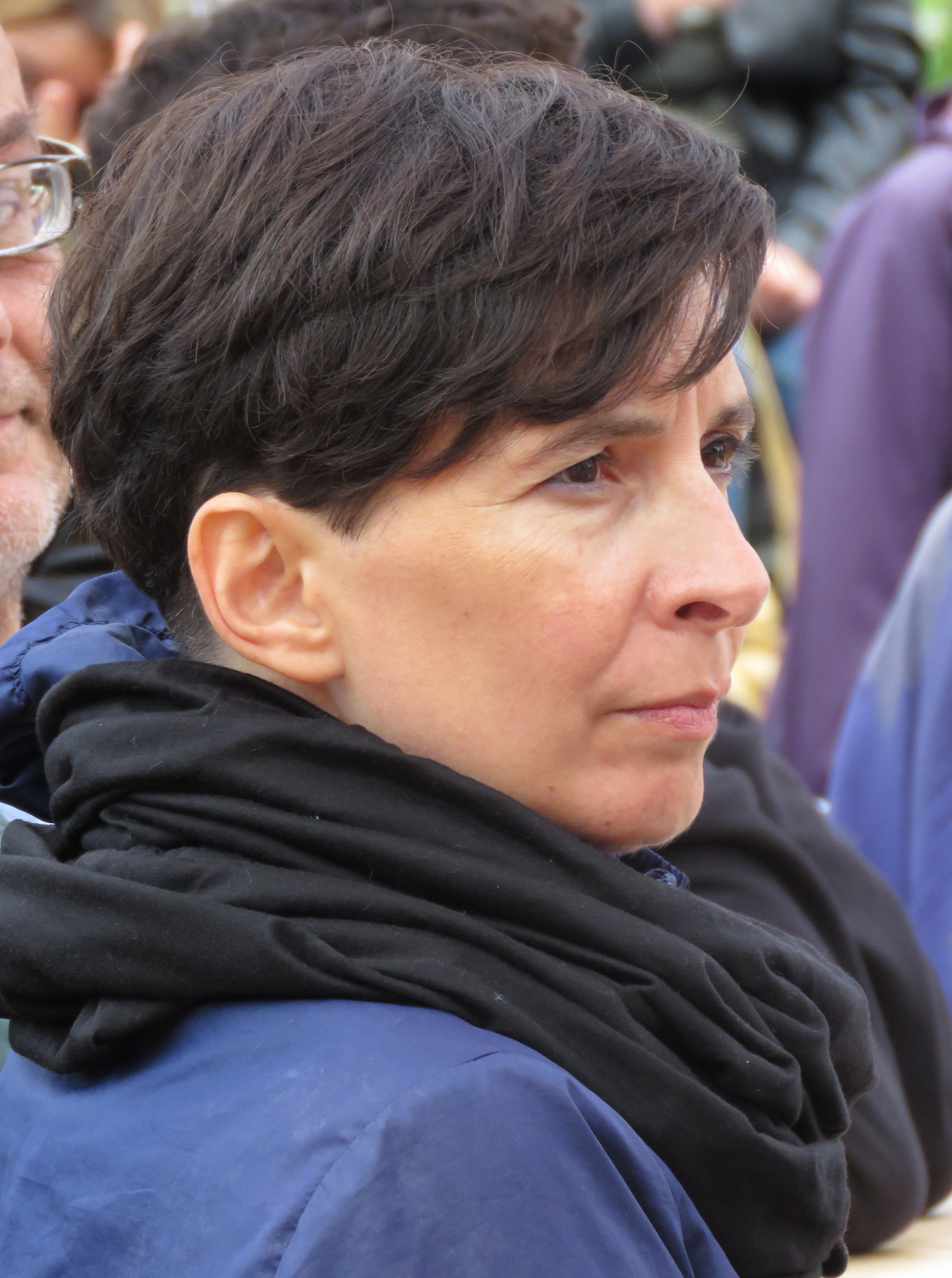
- Suchanow in 2018
- Born: 26 February 1974 (age 52); Kamienna Góra, Poland
- Education: University of Wrocław
- Occupations: author; editor; activist
- Notable work: Gombrowicz. I, the Genius (2017)
- Movement: All-Poland Women's Strike

Klementyna Suchanow [suxa'nɔf] (born 26 February 1974) is a Polish author, editor, and activist. She is the co-founder of the women's rights movement All-Poland Women's Strike.

== Biography ==
Born in Kamienna Góra, Poland, Suchanow lived in Chełmsko Śląskie, and Wałbrzych, and attended school in Wodzisław Śląski. She studied Polish and Spanish studies at the University of Wrocław. In 2003, she obtained a doctorate in literary studies. In the early 2000s, she worked as an editor in the publishing house Znak.

She has conducted research on the life and work of the Polish writer Witold Gombrowicz. In 2005, Suchanow published Argentyńskie przygody Gombrowicza ["The Argentinean Adventures of Gombrowicz"], and in 2017 she wrote the critically acclaimed biography Gombrowicz. Ja, geniusz ["Gombrowicz. I, the Genius"].

Suchanow also specializes in the history and literature of Latin America. In 2013, she published a historical reportage Królowa Karaibów ["The Queen of the Caribbean"], about the Cuban Revolution.

She published numerous articles on activities and the networks of a traditionalist Catholic organizations, including a Polish think tank Ordo Iuris, an ultra-conservative advocacy group CitizenGo, a religious right-wing organization World Congress of Families, the European Center for Law and Justice, the Center for Family and Human Rights, and their links to Kremlin.

Her 2020 book dedicated to those links and their social impact, To jest wojna. Kobiety, fundamentaliści i nowe średniowiecze ["This Is War. Women, Fundamentalists, and the New Middle Ages"] investigates an international network of traditionalist-conservative organizations in Poland, Europe, USA, and Latin America, and indicates their connections to Kremlin agents including Vladimir Yakunin and Konstantin Malofeev, as well as to the Russian Institute for Strategic Studies, controlled by Putin, which was accused of interference in the 2016 United States elections. The title of the book became a slogan of the 2020–2021 women's strike protests in Poland. In 2021, Suchanow was sued by Ordo Iuris for its description in her book.

The book is being adapted into a TV documentary series by a production company CreativeChaos, with Suchanow, Tom Donahue, Ilan Arboleda, and Jan Swietlik as executive producers. Suchanow will write the script.

=== Activism ===
Suchanow is one of the founders of the grassroots women's rights movement All-Poland Women's Strike and one of its most recognizable figures, along with Marta Lempart. She organized protests against the restriction of human rights and women's rights in Poland, on the judicial independence, and freedom of assembly.

After she threw eggs at limos leaving the Presidential Palace, the Internal Security Agency entered her house. In July 2018, on the wall of the Sejm, she sprayed: "Time for a final judgment. Fuck off" (Polish: Czas na sąd ostateczny. Wypierdalać), before the police detained her. In May 2018, Suchanow was among activists who stopped a neo-fascists march in Warsaw. In November 2018, she was amongst the attacked by militants during the Independence March. In August 2018, she underwent a spine surgery after a police interventions.

On 22 October 2020, after a Constitutional Court decision, Suchanow with Lempart and Agnieszka Czerederecka, became leaders of the anti-governmental women's protests led by the Women's Strike. The protests continued until 28 January 2021, when the Court's decision was mulled over and went into effect. During a protest in front of the seat of the Court, Suchanow and two other persons jumped over the fence and were subsequently arrested. She was charged with violating the bodily integrity of a police officer, trespassing the grounds of the Constitutional Court and damaging its entry doors by nailing up a poster. As Suchanow called the protests "a revolution," and the objectives of the movement have widened to many other issues, she co-founded the Consultative Council. Leaders of the Women's Strike including Suchanow faced criminal charges for "publicly praising criminal behavior," and organizing the 2020–2021 protests.

On 1 July 2021, Suchanow spoke at the United Nations Women during the Generation Equality Forum held in Paris.

== Personal life ==
Suchanow has a daughter, and lives in Warsaw.

== Bibliography ==
- The Argentinean Adventures of Gombrowicz (Polish: Argentyńskie podróże Gombrowicza, 2005),
- The Queen of the Caribbean (Polish: Królowa Karaibów, 2013),
- Gombrowicz. I, the Genius (Polish: Gombrowicz. Ja, geniusz, 2017),
- This Is War. Women, Fundamentalists, and the New Middle Ages (Polish: To jest wojna. Kobiety, fundamentaliści i nowe średniowiecze, 2020).

== Awards and recognitions ==
In 2018, Suchanow's biography Gombrowicz. I, the Genius was among the nominees for the Nike Award. The book was awarded by the art-and-culture magazine Odra, and by the portal Onet, with the literary award O!lśnienie Onetu.

In 2017, the fact-checking website OKO.press placed her on its list of "17 Women Who Rocked PiS". In 2020, she was named the Woman of the Year by Forbes Women.

In 2021 Suchanow was awarded the Polcul Prize, a Polish diaspora award founded in 1980, "for outstanding achievements in the fight for women's rights." Previous winners include notable émigrés Jerzy Giedroyc, Jan Nowak-Jeziorański, and one of Solidarity leaders Jacek Kuroń.
