= Natalia Broniarczyk =

Polish abortion rights activist

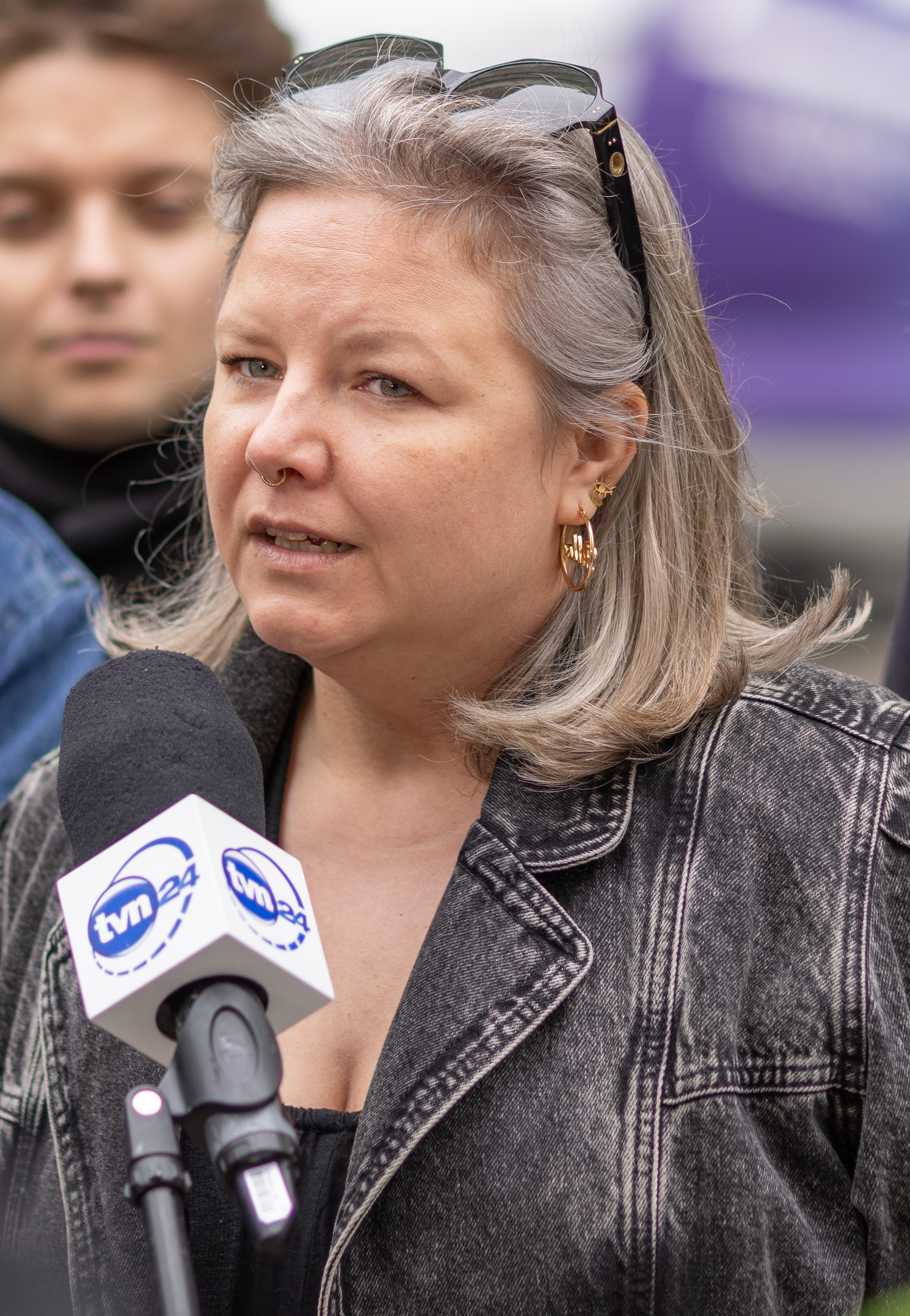
- Natalia Broniarczyk (2025)
- Organization: Abortion Dream Team

Natalia Broniarczyk (born 1983/1984) is a Polish abortion rights activist. She is a member of Abortion Dream Team (Polish: Aborcyjny Dream Team), which formed in October 2016 to help women in Poland to source and safely take abortion pills.

== Career ==
Prior to joining the Abortion Dream Team, Broniarczyk worked at the Federation for Women and Family Planning, the country's largest reproductive rights non-profit, as a sex educator.

Broniarczyk is a researcher on self-managed abortion and its history.

== Activism ==
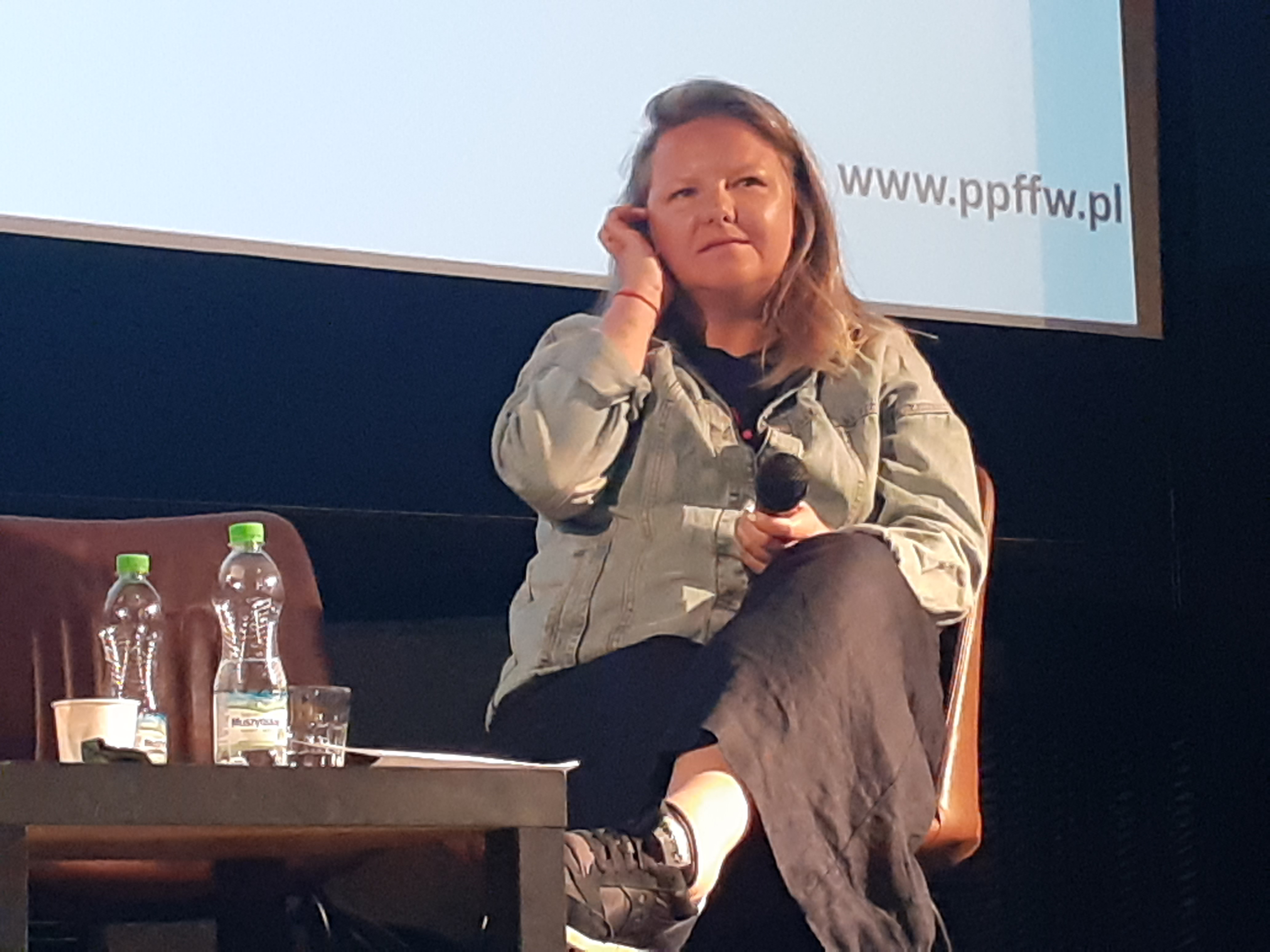
Natalia Broniarczyk in 2023.

Broniarczyk was first made aware of the obstacles surrounding self-managed medical abortion when she herself needed an abortion in 2011. While looking for answers to her questions about how to induce a medical abortion and how to care for herself afterward, she met Justyna Wydrzyńska, who would go on to be another member of the Abortion Dream Team.

As part of the Abortion Dream Team, Broniarczyk provides women with information on how to find abortion pills, and also helps women who go abroad to have abortions in countries like Germany, the Netherlands, and the United Kingdom. She runs the organization's TikTok page, where she makes educational videos on self-managed medical abortion.

In October 2020, Broniarczyk participated in protests after the Polish Constitutional Tribunal struck down a section of the law on abortion that allowed abortion in the case of "severe foetal anomalies".

In June 2022, when the Sejm introduced a bill allowing abortions for any reasons up to 12 weeks of pregnancy, Broniarczyk gave a speech in favor of the bill, during which she described how to induce abortion with medication.

== Awards and recognition ==
In October 2023, Broniarczyk received an award from the European Union for her work on abortion rights.
