= Agata Grzybowska =

Polish photo journalist

- Born: 1984
- Occupation: War correspondent, photojournalist

Agata Grzybowska is a Polish photojournalist and war correspondent. She is well known for her photographs from the Syrian civil war, the 2011–2014 Egyptian crisis, and Euromaidan in Ukraine.

== Childhood and education ==
Grzybowska was born in 1984. She graduated from the National Film School in Łódź, where she studied photography.

== Photojournalism and war correspondence ==
Grzybowska started work as a photojournalist for Gazeta Wyborcza (GW) in 2012. She was sent by GW as a photographic war correspondent to the Syrian civil war, to Egypt during the 2011–2014 crisis, and to Ukraine during Euromaidan. Grabowska's photos of protests in Poland are distributed internationally by Associated Press and Thomson Reuters.

One of Grabowska's photos taken in Kyiv during Euromaidan, on 16 January 2014, "Black Thursday", won the BZ WBK Press Foto award for 2015. Grabowska described the scene that she saw on arriving at the centre of the events in Kyiv in the evening of 16 January as "a postwar landscape". She said that the casualties were being counted, and the wounded cared for. Grzybowska described the scene of her photo, stating that she saw some exhausted protestors resting for a moment in front of a barricade supported by tyres, not knowing if they would become the next victims; that smoke was in the air; and that she tried to show the "depth of human existence".

=== 2020 detention at anti-Czarnek protest ===
During the October–November 2020 Polish protests, Grzybowska's 18 November photo of a journalist being treated after a tear gas attack by police was widely circulated by Associated Press.

At a 23 November 2020 protest against Science and Education Minister Przemysław Czarnek in Warsaw, during the protests, Grzybowska was detained by police.

A video documenting Grzybowska's detention showed that photojournalists present at the incident loudly told the police that Grzybowska was a journalist and that Grzybowska displayed her journalist's identification card while she was being detained. The journalists yelled to the police that since Grzybowska was a journalist, it was illegal to detain her. Altogether five protestors were detained, including Łania, a Stop Bzdurom activist. Members of the Polish lower house of parliament, the Sejm, and photojournalists went to the police station at Wilcza Street where Grzybowska was detained. One protestor was deliberately hit by a police van, according to OKO.press journalist Maciek Piasek, who said that the protestor's hand was broken. Police spokesperson Sylwester Marczak alleged that Grzybowska had assaulted a police officer.

Grzybowska was released at 19:00 local time, two hours after her detention. Photojournalist Jędrzej Nowicki stated that the police claim of Grzybowska assaulting a police officer was "impossible", because she was in "a crowd of journalists and police", and she was "two heads shorter than most of" the police surrounding her. He described the context of the preceding few days of police brutality as unprecedented in his experience. By 02:00 in the early morning of 24 November, 400 journalists and photojournalists had signed an appeal written by Bianka Mikołajewska of OKO.press complaining about police violence against the media during the preceding weeks and calling for the police to cease all actions limiting press freedom and journalists' work.

== Other publications and prizes ==
Grzybowska's photographic interviews with nine people living isolated lives in the Bieszczady Mountains, published as 9 Gates of No Return (Polish: 9 bram, z powrotem ani jednej), received several prizes, including the Photo Book of The Year 2017 awarded by Grand Press Photo. Grzybowska described her choice to visit loners living in the Bieszczady Mountains as a spur of the moment decision resulting from her realisation that the loners' lives were similar to her life as a war photographer, as a resignation from everyday life, though in different ways. She spent four months in one winter and three months in the following winter in the mountains.

== Personal life ==
Grzybowska dedicated her 2017 book, 9 Gates of No Return, to her partner Ola.
