= Justyna Wydrzyńska =

Polish abortion-rights activist

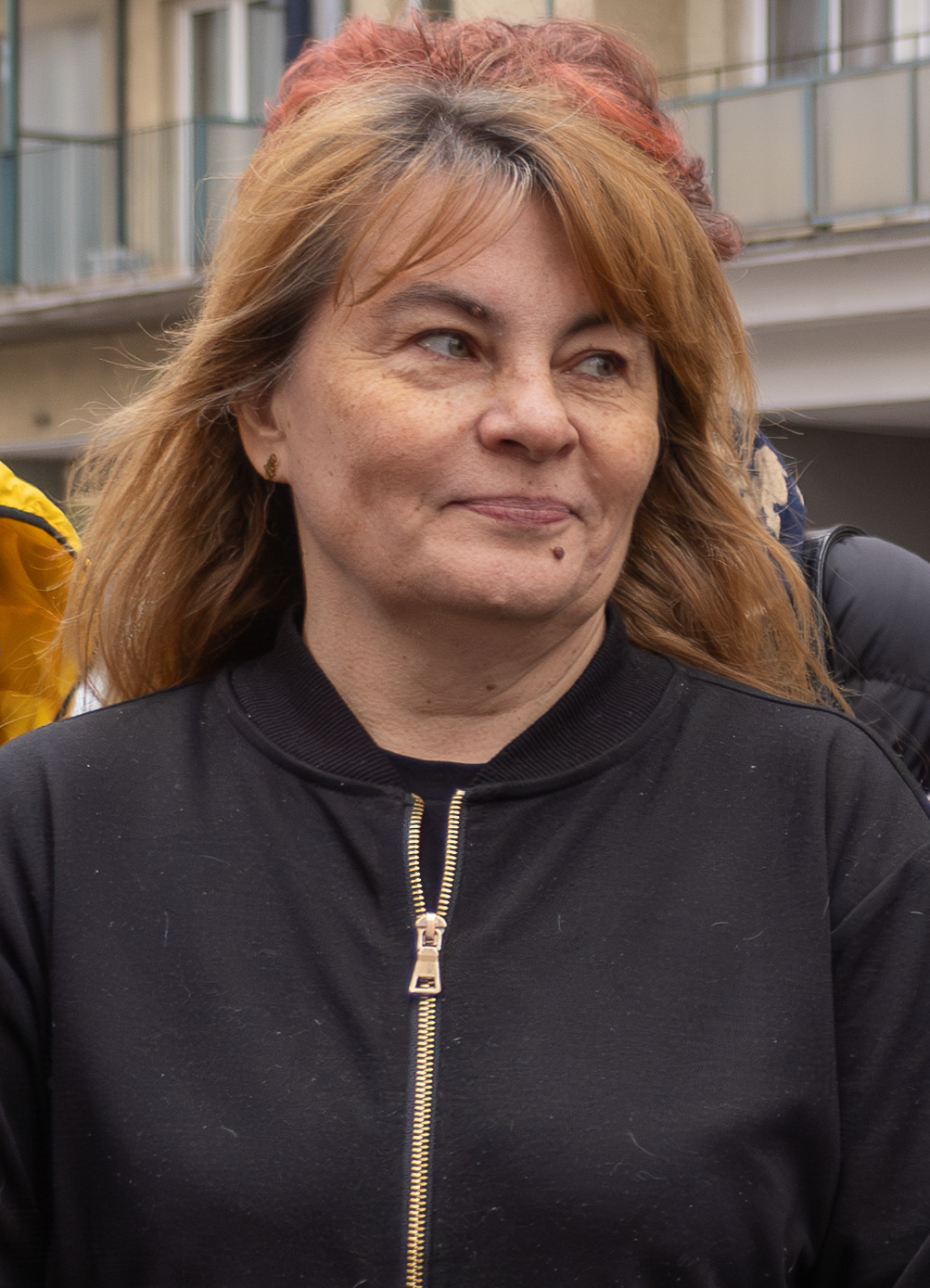
- Justyna Wydrzyńska (May 2025)
- Organization: Abortion Dream Team
- Known for: Abortion rights activism

Justyna Wydrzyńska is a Polish abortion-rights activist. She is the first abortion-rights activist in Europe to be convicted of aiding a woman to get an abortion.

== Activism ==
Wydrzyńska launched Kobiety w Sieci, an online website providing information about self-induced medical abortions, after she had her own induced abortion in 2006.

In 2016, Wydrzyńska and three other women founded the Abortion Dream Team.

In December 2019, Wydrzyńska helped found Abortion Without Borders, an initiative connecting Polish women with abortion providers in Germany, Czech Republic, Austria, the Netherlands, and the UK.

In 2023, Wydrzyńska was shortlisted, alongside two other abortion rights activists, for the Sakharov Prize for Freedom of Thought.

== Arrest and trial ==
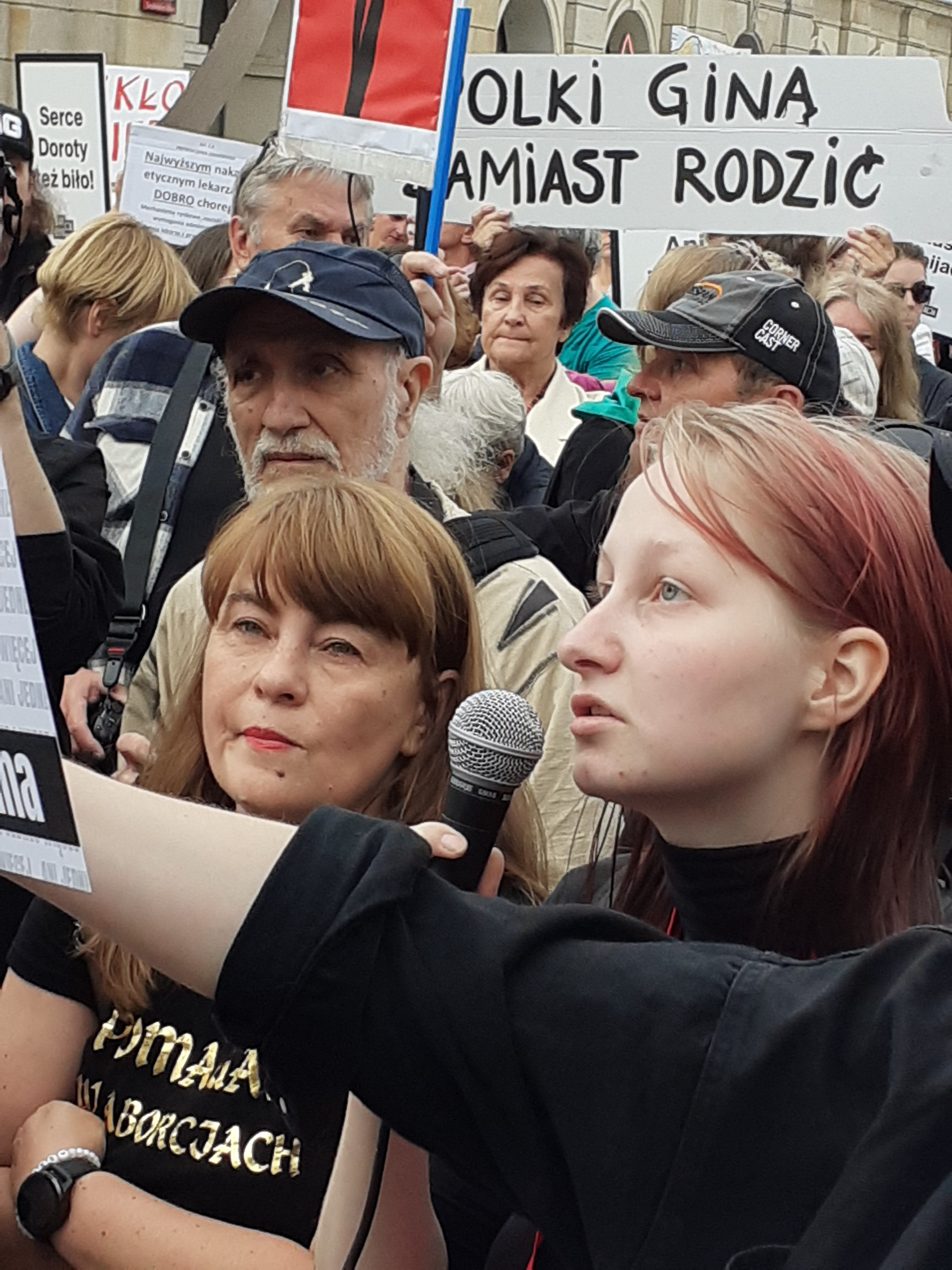
Justyna Wydrzyńska in 2023.

In November 2021, Wydrzyńska was arrested after sending abortion pills to a pregnant woman through the mail in 2020. She was charged with "intent to aid an abortion and unauthorized distribution of a pharmaceutical". Wydrzyńska's defense argued that she had sent the abortion pills, but that doing so was "an act of human rights", that she had not aided an abortion, since the pregnant woman had not ended up taking the pills, and that the law against aiding an abortion, as written, should not apply to Wydrzyńska or other similar activists.

Her first court date was in August 2022. Representatives from human rights groups and European embassies were denied entry to the proceedings. An ultraconservative, catholic organization Ordo Iuris was allowed entry to the proceedings as legal representatives of the foetus.

In March 2023, Wydrzyńska was convicted with abetting an abortion. She was sentenced to 8 months of community service. Her charges and conviction were condemned by Amnesty International, Human Rights Watch, the International Federation of Gynaecology and Obstetrics, the International Planned Parenthood Federation, and the United Nations.

In February 2025, the Warsaw Court of Appeals overturned Wydrzyńska's conviction and ordered she be given a retrial, citing concerns of judicial independence in the original trial.

== Personal life ==
Wydrzyńska was initially a chemist.

As of 2020, she was living in the Polish town of Przasnysz.
