= All-Poland Women's Strike =

Feminist movement in Poland

- Ogólnopolski Strajk Kobiet
- One of the official posters
- Formation: 25 September 2016; 9 years ago
- Founders: Marta Lempart; Klementyna Suchanow
- Origins: 2016 Black Protest

The All-Poland Women's Strike or Polish Women's Strike (Polish: Ogólnopolski Strajk Kobiet, OSK) is a women's rights social movement in Poland, established in September 2016. It was set up in protest against the rejection by the Sejm of the Polish Parliament of the bill "Save Women", which was considered by the Sejm in parallel to the project "Stop Abortion". The movement was responsible for the organization of Black Monday, a protest action, involving various forms of strike, that took place simultaneously in 147 Polish cities, towns and villages.

== Structure and key people ==
In October 2017, Marta Lempart was head of All-Poland Women's Strike. While OSK was a key organiser of the September 2016 Black Protests, the protests themselves were decentralised. The writer Klementyna Suchanow was one of OSK's leaders who proposed the 26 October 2020 "walk" to the house of de facto leader of Poland Jarosław Kaczyński, which turned into a 10,000-person protest. Suchanow described the tactics for the continuation of the protests as decentralised, up to grassroots initiatives and creativity.

In October 2020, Suchanow stated that the OSK is not a political party, but that some members aimed at becoming members of the Sejm, and that Katarzyna Kotula of the OSK Szczecin was already a Deputy.

=== Coordination Council ===
On 1 November 2020, in response to the widespread demands of the October 2020 protests that extended beyond anger against an abortion-related ruling, OSK established the Consultative Council inspired by the Belarusian Coordination Council that had earlier been created in August 2020, during the 2020 Belarusian protests.

== History ==
=== 2016–2017: Creation and early protests ===
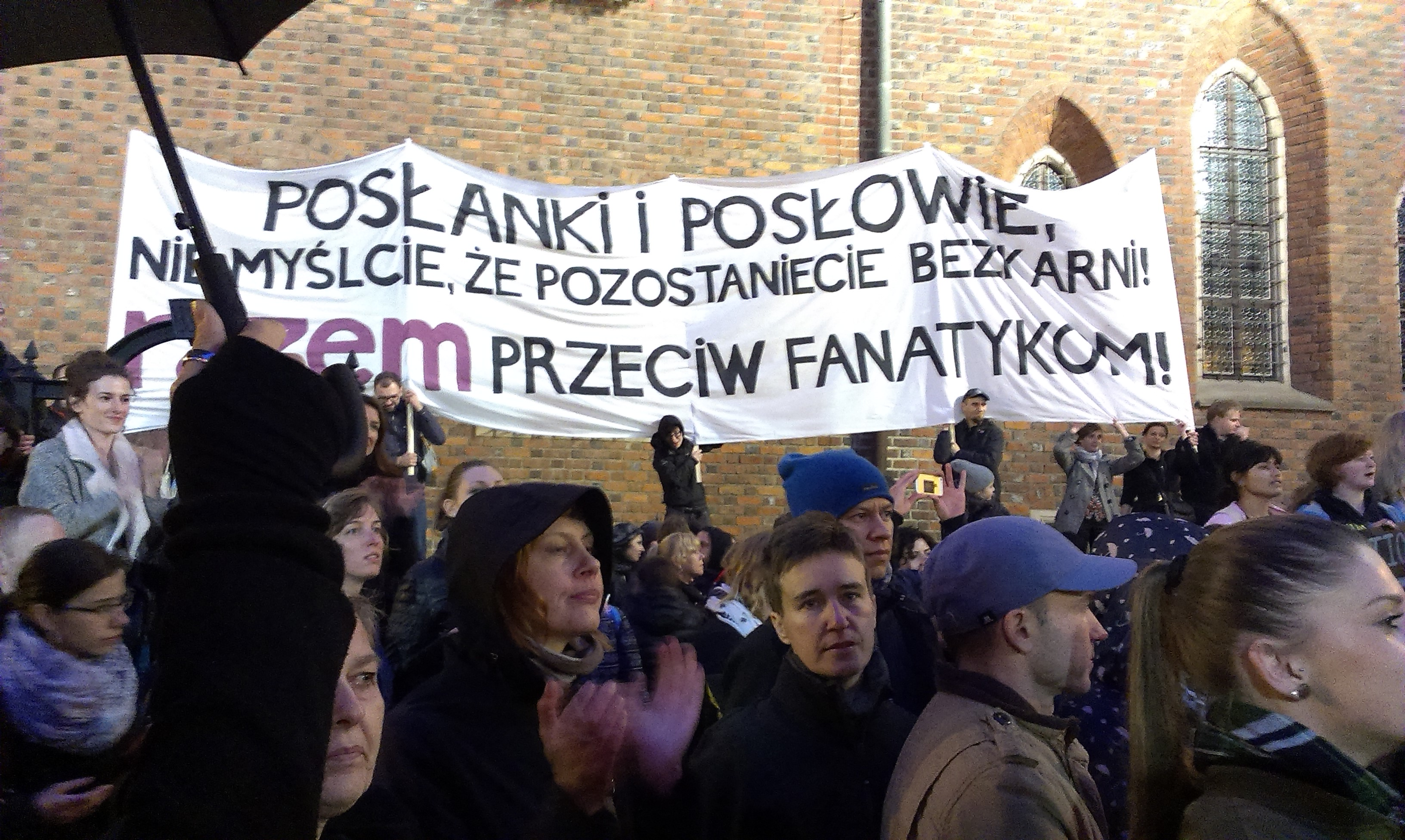
Black Monday protest in Wrocław, 3 October 2016

All-Poland Women's Strike was created as one of the groups organising the protests which took place in September and October 2016 Black Protests against proposed legislation that would have tightened abortion law. The protests brought together 100,000 protesters who marched in 143 villages, towns and cities in Poland. Together with Argentinian women's rights activists, among others from Ni Una Menos, the OSK launched the International Women's Strike with women from 28 other countries in 2017. Suchanow said in an interview to Le Monde that the initiative comes from Poland, "In Poland we know how to make revolutions" ("En Pologne, nous savons comment faire les révolutions"). A few years later, in 2020, Suchanow published a book, This is War, in which she describes the origins of the OSK and the International Women's Strike, known in Spanish as Paro Internacional de Mujeres.

=== 2017–present: Repression and continued protests ===
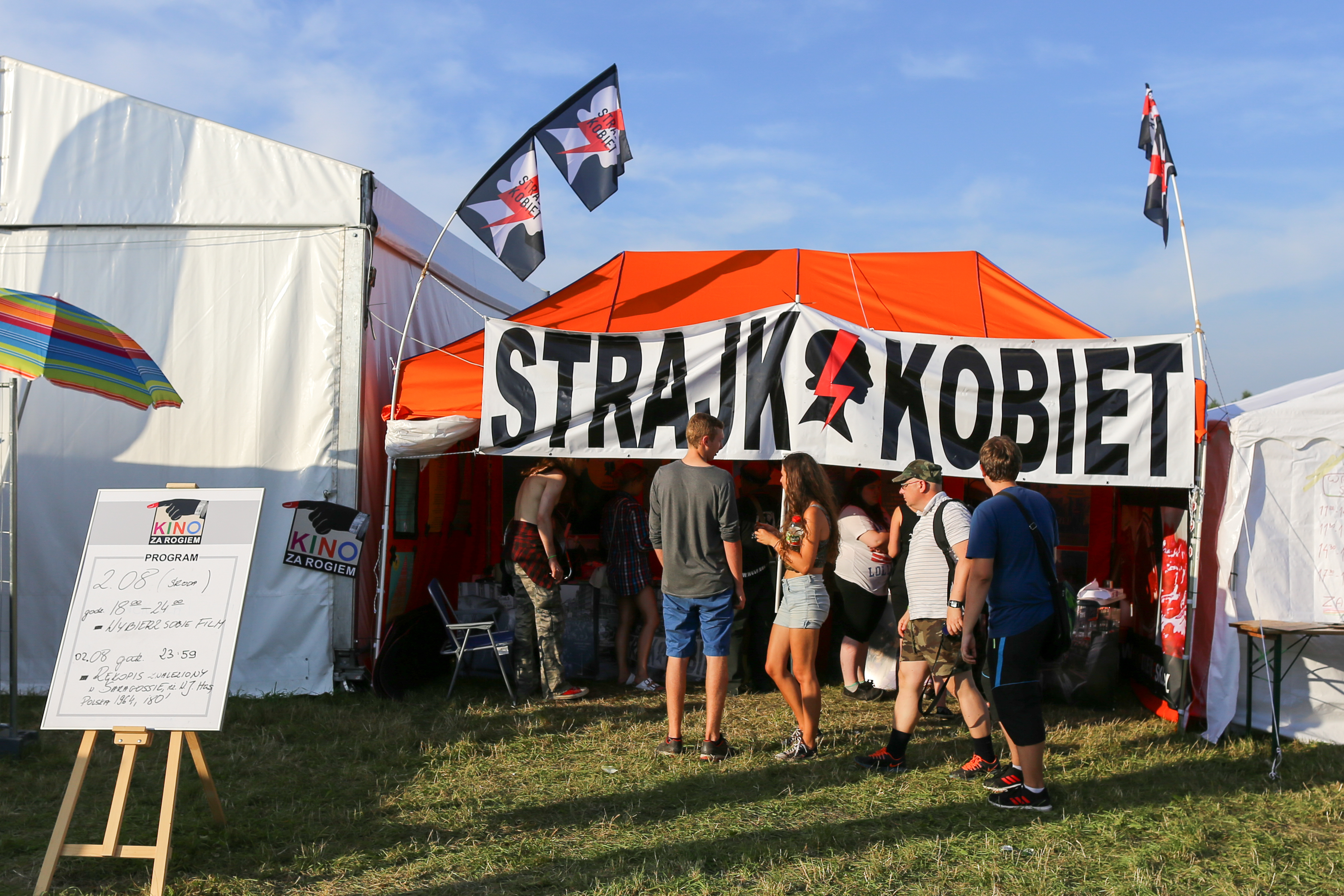
A Strajk Kobiet booth at Woodstock Festival Poland in 2017

On 4 October 2017, following protests organised by OSK, police raided the offices of the Women's Rights Centre and Baba in Warsaw, Gdańsk, Łódź and Zielona Góra. The raids were interpreted as intimidation. Marta Lempart, head of OSK, described the raids as "abuse of power" that disrupted the women's work by the confiscation of computers and documents. The police spent nine hours in the office of Baba removing files. In July 2020, the Polish government considered withdrawal from the Istanbul Convention that aims to prevent violence against women and domestic violence. Two thousand women protested in front of the Ordo Iuris headquarters. Marta Lempart described the government's attitude to women's rights, stating, "This government has been laughing in the faces of victims of gender violence for years."

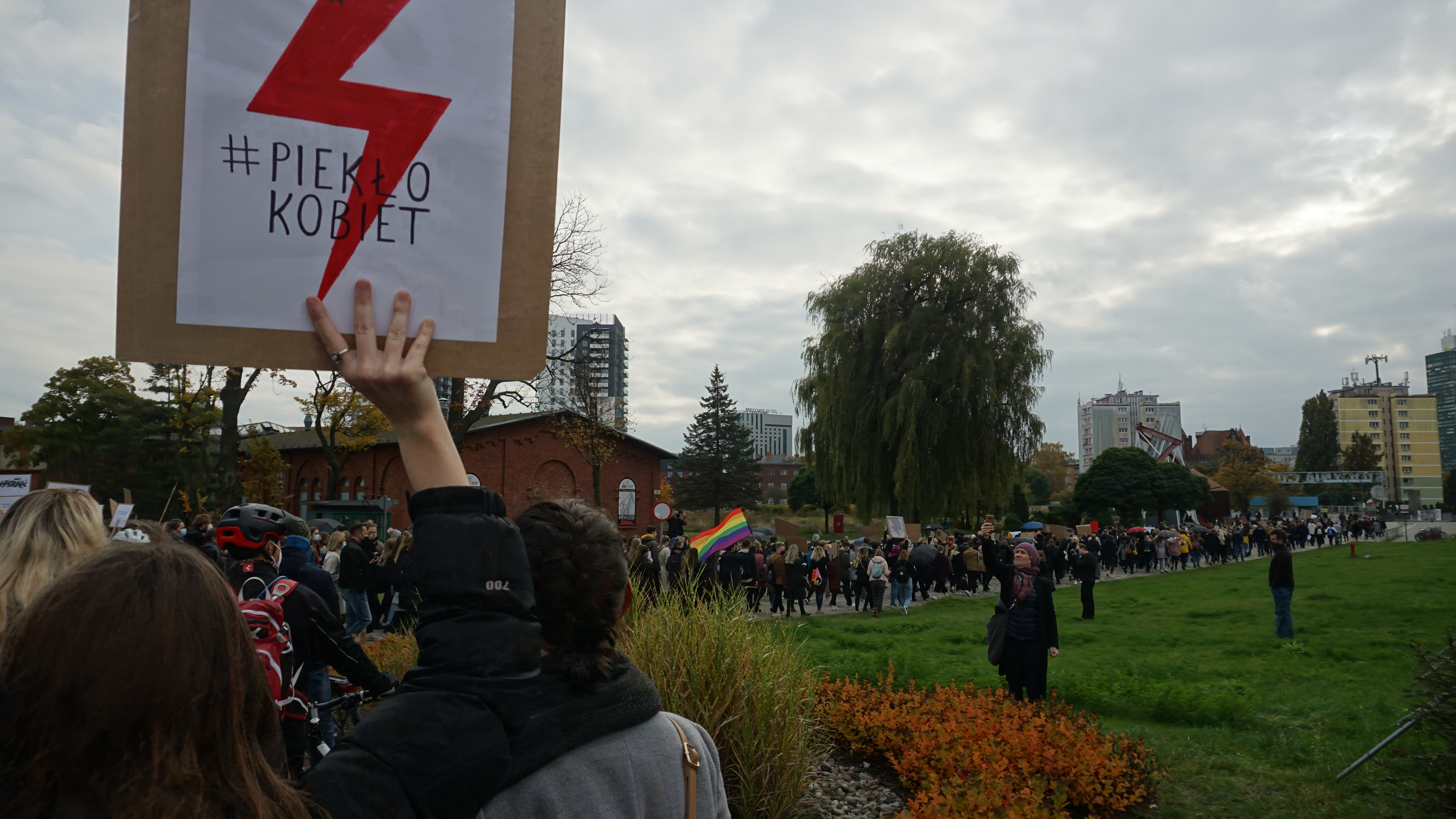
Marchers with a "women's hell" hashtag and the OSK red lightning symbol on a banner, protesting on 24 October 2020 in Gdańsk

==== October 2020 protests ====
OSK was one of the coordinators of the October 2020 Polish protests that followed the 22 October 2020 Constitutional Tribunal's ruling banning the most commonly used of the three cases allowing a small number of legal abortions in Poland. On 27 October, on behalf of OSK and proposals from citizens, stated that the aims of the protests included a return to the rule of law:

- full women's rights: legal elective abortion care, sex education, and contraception that is free of charge at the point of use
- interpreting the Constitutional Tribunal's ruling, as stated by the president of the tribunal, Julia Przyłębska, as Przyłębska's personal testimony instead of a legal ruling
- the return of a "real" (independent) Constitutional Tribunal
- the return to a neutral (independent) Supreme Court of Poland that is not controlled by the Law and Justice party (PiS)
- the appointment of a "real" (independent, not someone from ruling party) Polish Ombudsman, to replace Adam Bodnar, who reached the end of his term.

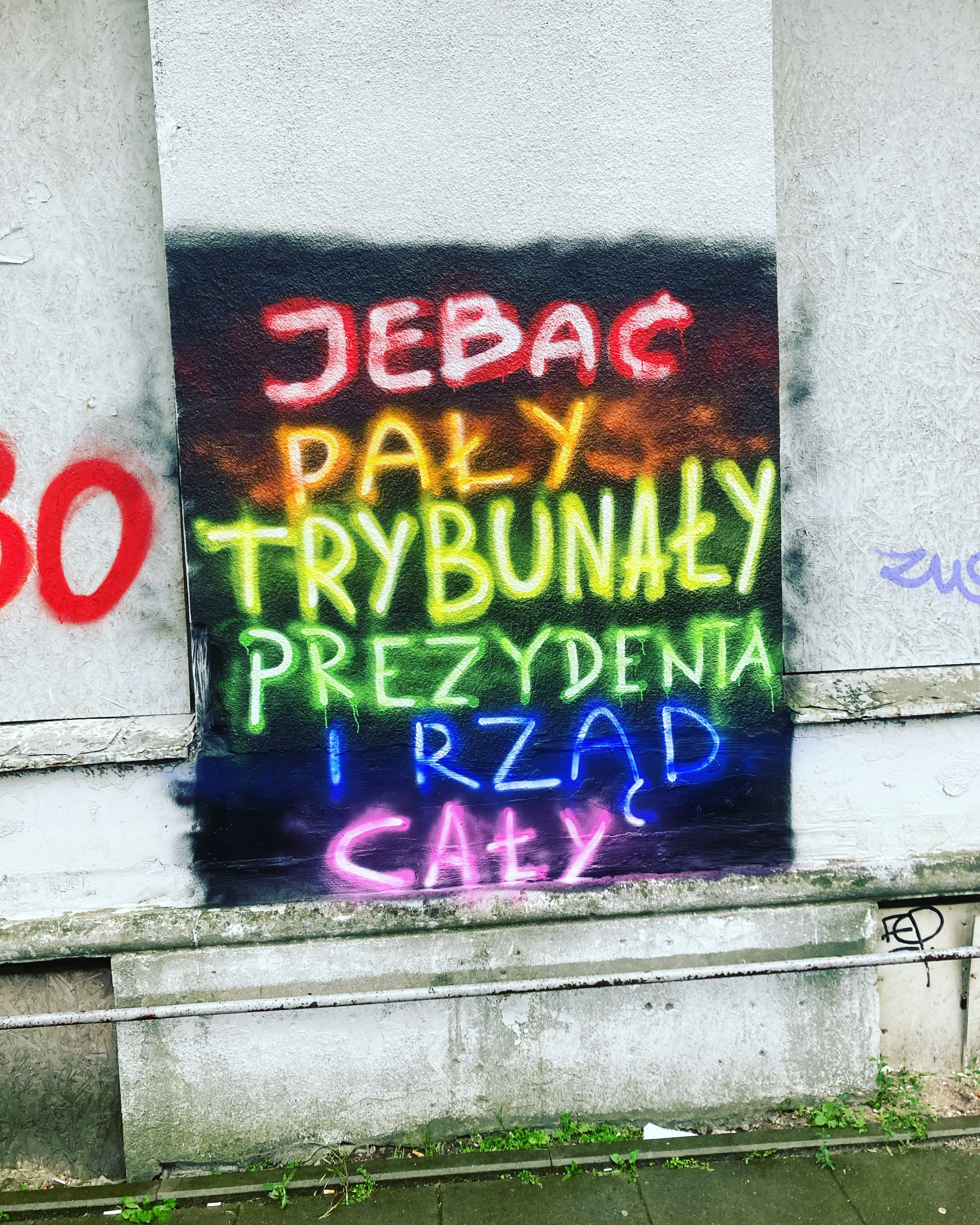
Rainbow graffiti created in October 2020 on Prosta street in Warsaw, saying "Jebać pały, trybunały, prezydenta i rząd cały" (Fuck the cops, the tribunals, the president, and the entire government) alluding to the abortion ban and wide-spread anti-queer sentiments.

On 28 October 2020, Suchanow stated that the initial involvement of OSK in the protests was to defend women's own rights, not to remove the government. She stated that the aims of the protests had expanded based on comments, slogans, and wide discussions with people who had joined the protests.

Suchanow, who had been injured by the police during protests in earlier years, leading to a spinal operation, interpreted a speech by Jarosław Kaczyński as a refusal to withdraw the Constitutional Tribunal ruling and an encouragement of escalation of violence.

Marta Lempart of OSK addressed Catholics in relation to the protests, stating in a radio interview, "Dear Catholics, you have a chance right now to oppose your church. Right now you are participating in what is happening in the disgusting things done by the church. And it's your last warning, because it's you who should rebel, your community, you, active in the life of the church."

During the protests, some Roman Catholic churches across Poland were graffitied and masses (liturgical services) were disrupted. The protesters also blocked streets across several cities. In response to an interviewer's statement that graffiti and mass interruptions were unnecessary, Lempart stated, "Of course that's needed. You should do that which you feel, which you judge is effective, and that which they deserve."

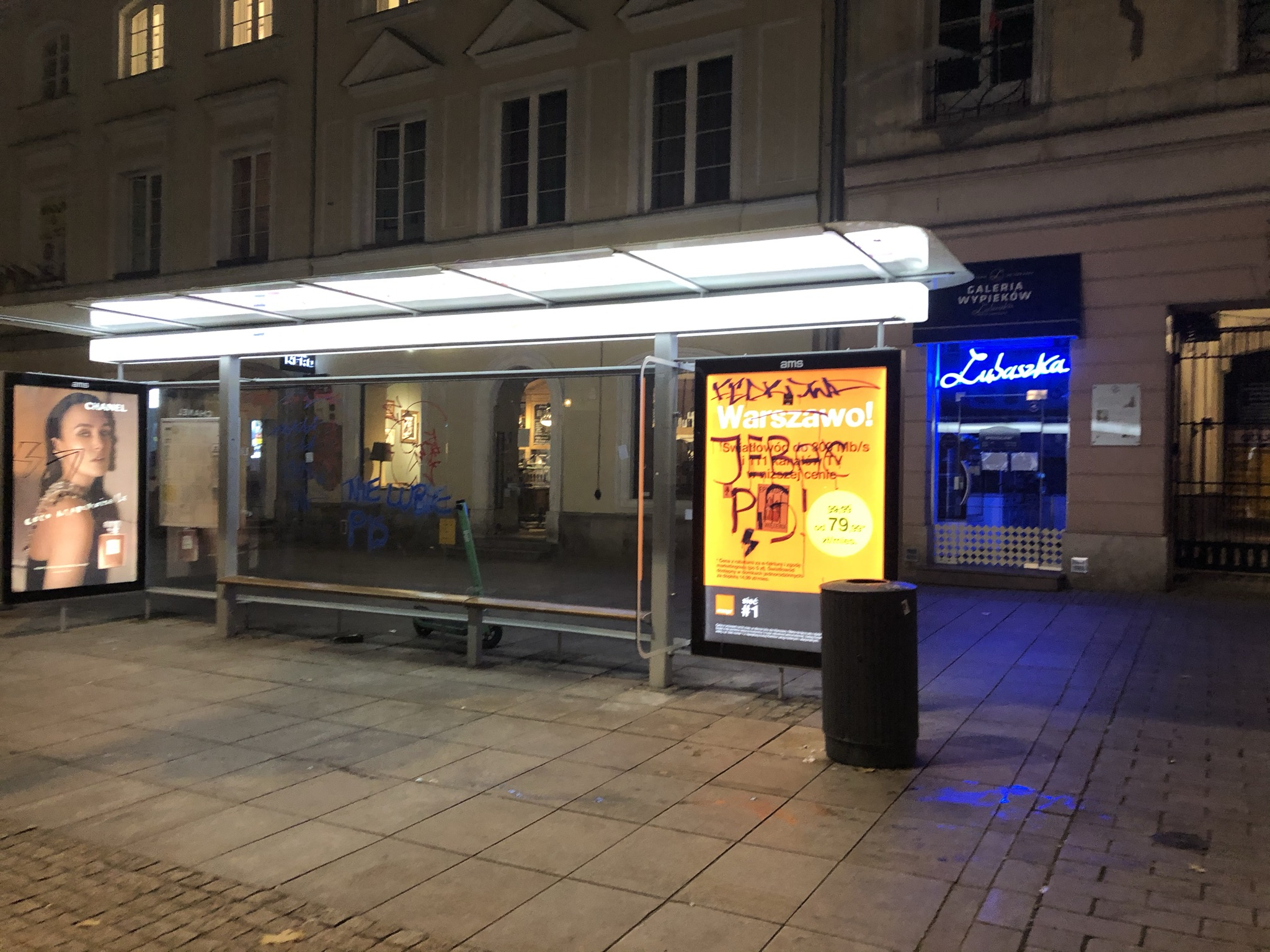
Graffiti in Warsaw during the October 2020 protests stating "Jebać PiS" (Fuck PiS)
