= Centre for Women's Rights =

Centrum Praw Kobiet (in English Centre for Women's Rights) is a non-governmental organization in Poland that supports women's rights and the prevention of violence against women.

== About ==
Centrum Praw Kobiet works to promote women's equality in Polish society and also is involved in preventing violence against women. Branches are located in Wrocław, Łódź and Gdańsk. A specialist center is available where women can receive legal and mental health information and services. In 2017, CPK provided 650,850 women with legal and psychological help.

== History ==
The Centrum Praw Kobiet (CPK) was founded by Urszula Nowakowska in 1995.

Starting in 2015, the CPK stopped receiving government money. The reason given for refusing to fund CPK was that it focuses on violence against women, not against men and women both. In 2017, the Polish Government raided the offices of the CPK in several cities. The group had participated in pro-choice protests, organized by the Polish Women's Strike, a week prior to the raid. Along with taking computers and interfering with the organization's business, files containing sensitive information about victims of abuse. Those involved called the raids an "abuse of power."
