= NaTemat.pl =

Polish-language news/opinion website

naTemat
- Owners: Tomasz Lis, NextWeb Media, Robert Jędrzejczyk
- Website: natemat.pl
- Launched: February 22, 2012; 14 years ago

NaTemat.pl (lit. OnTopic) is a Polish language website created by Tomasz Lis on 22 February 2012. It includes a wide variety of content including latest events, politics, lifestyle, culture, social issues and economic and sports information.

== Visitors ==
After seven months since the creation of naTemat, the boss and editor-in-chief Tomasz Machała reported that the website had exceeded one million unique visitors. According to the January 2013 study of the Polish internet by Megapanel_PBI/Gemius, the website was 15th place in the category of "information and journalism" with 940,495 real users.

== Authors ==
The service combines editorial content and blogs. The approximately 400 authors include Janusz Palikot, Jacek Dehnel, Sebastian Gojdź Justyna Kowalczyk, Marcin Orliński, Jacek Rostowski, Krzysztof Hołowczyc, Aleksander Kwaśniewski, Krystyna Kofta, Karol Okrasa.
