= Marta Lempart =

Polish activist (born 1979)

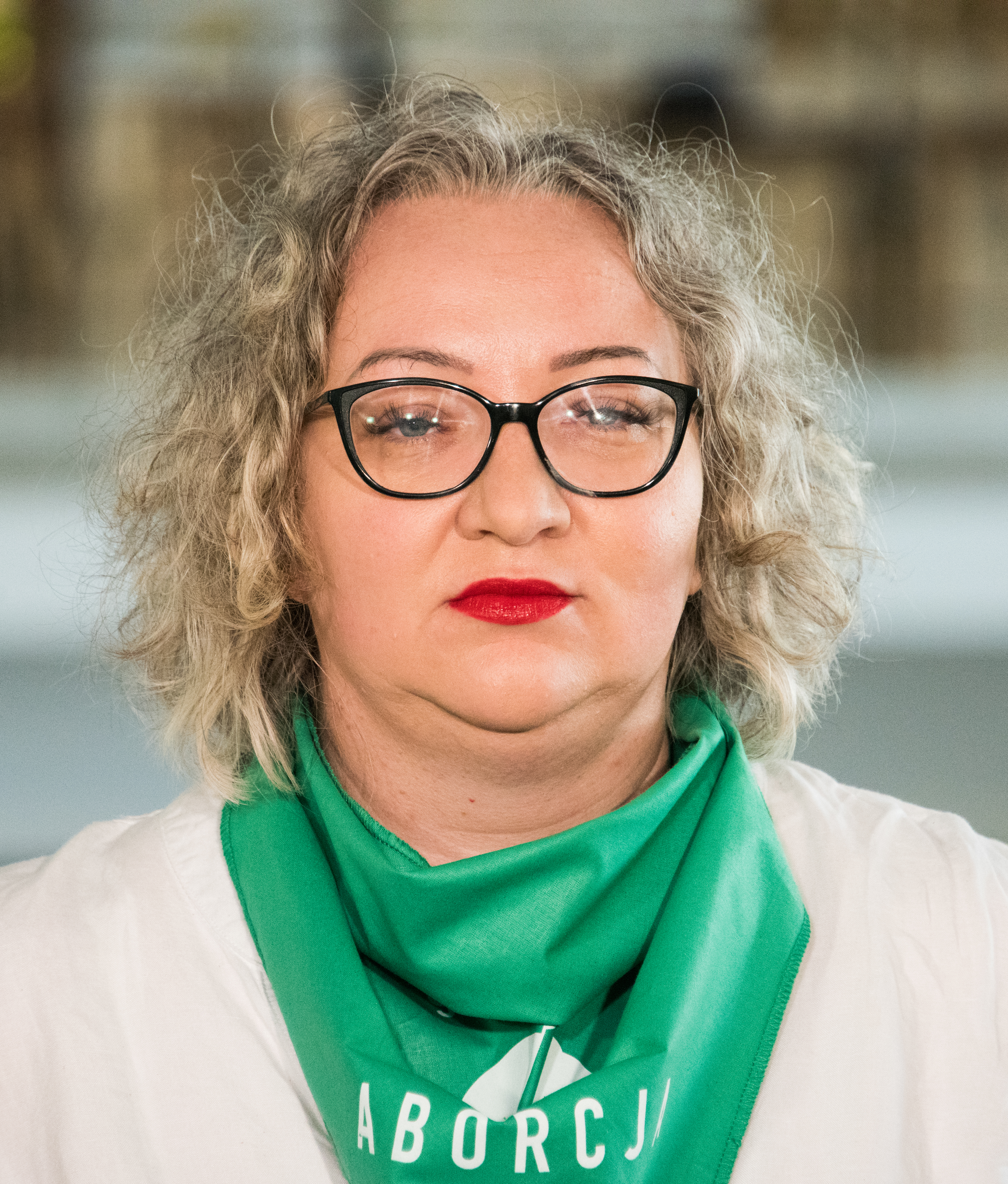
- Marta Lempart in 2018.
- Born: 1979 (age 46–47); Lwówek Śląski, Poland
- Occupation: Women's rights activist
- Organization: All-Poland Women's Strike
- Known for: Involvement in feminist and secular anti-government protests in Poland

Marta Mirosława Lempart (born 1979) is a Polish women's rights activist and the founder of the All-Poland Women's Strike.

Active since 2016 in widespread protests against tightening abortion laws under the conservative Law and Justice party, Lempart has been targeted by the government with arrests and legal charges, and has faced death threats from opponents of the protests.

Her work has also included advocating for equal rights for members of Poland's LGBT community and for people with disabilities. She is a vocal proponent of secularism and the separation of church and state.

== Early life and career ==
Marta Lempart was born in 1979 in Lwówek Śląski, Poland. She is formally trained as a lawyer.

Lempart held a minor role in the Polish Ministry of Labour and Social Policy during the Civic Platform's time in power, during which time she worked to improve disability rights in the country. She then worked in real estate development.

After the conservative Law and Justice party came to power in 2015, Lempart began working with the Committee for the Defence of Democracy, a pro-European NGO.

== Activism ==
Lempart's activism centers on feminism and secularism.

In 2016, she co-founded the All-Poland Women's Strike, a social movement in support of women's rights, during preparations for the pro-abortion-access Black Protests. She describes the group's aims as including better abortion access, stronger women’s rights and LGBT rights, separation of church and state, and better health care.

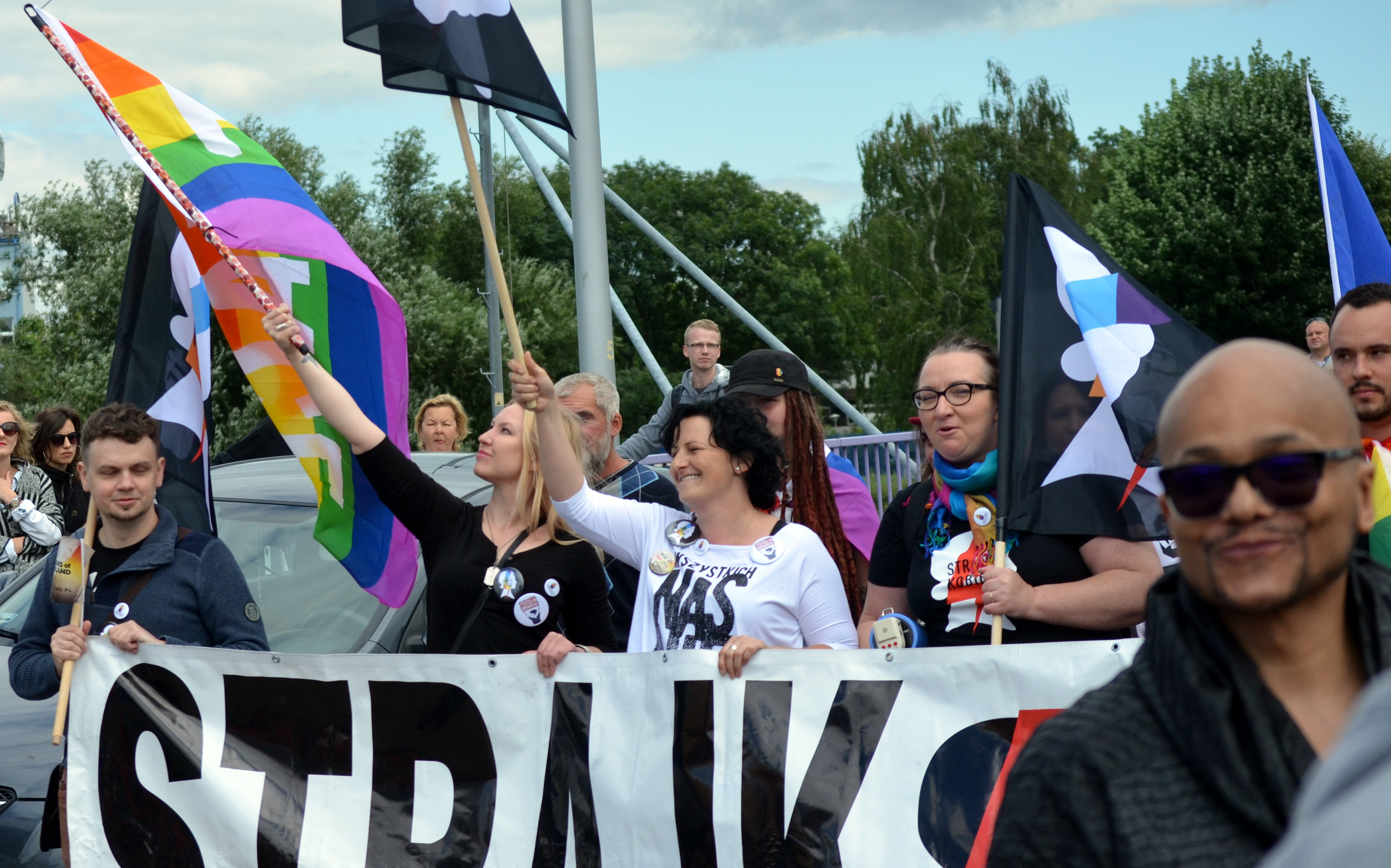
Marta Lempart (right) and fellow activists attend a Pride Parade in 2018.

Lempart ran for local office in Wrocław in 2018, but she did not gain a seat. She also ran unsuccessfully for the European Parliament the following year.

The All-Poland Women's Strike, which she continues to lead, was one of the major forces behind the 2020–2021 women's strike protests in Poland, an anti-government protest movement in response to tightening abortion laws. Lempart encouraged Catholics to take a stand against their church during the protests, which drew significant pushback.

She has been arrested various times throughout her years of activism, and charged with dozens of offenses. In February 2021, the Polish government charged Lempart with criminal felonies for her role in the women's strike protests and criticism of the Catholic Church, which she described as a form of political pressure on her movement. She has also received death threats from critics, forcing her to go into hiding away from her home.
