= Monika Falej =

Polish politician (born 1972)

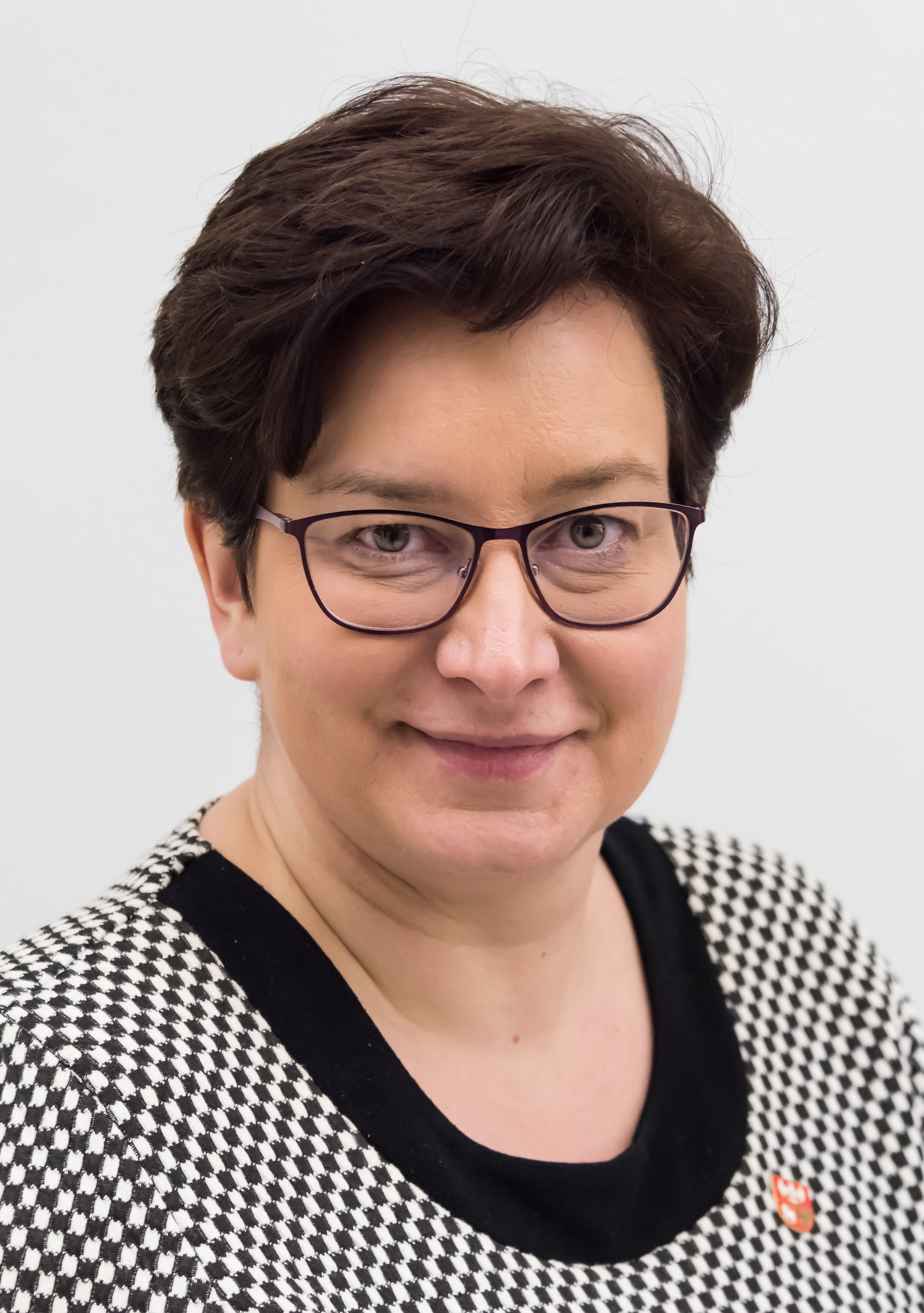

Member of the Sejm
- In office 12 November 2019 – 12 November 2023

Personal details
- Born: 8 February 1972 (age 54)

Monika Walentyna Falej (born 8 February 1972) is a Polish politician. She was elected to the Sejm (9th term) representing the constituency of Elbląg from The Left's lists.

== Private life ==
Falej is disabled and has been working in behalf of improving the disabled's life conditions in her local community.
