= Abortion Dream Team =

Polish abortion rights group

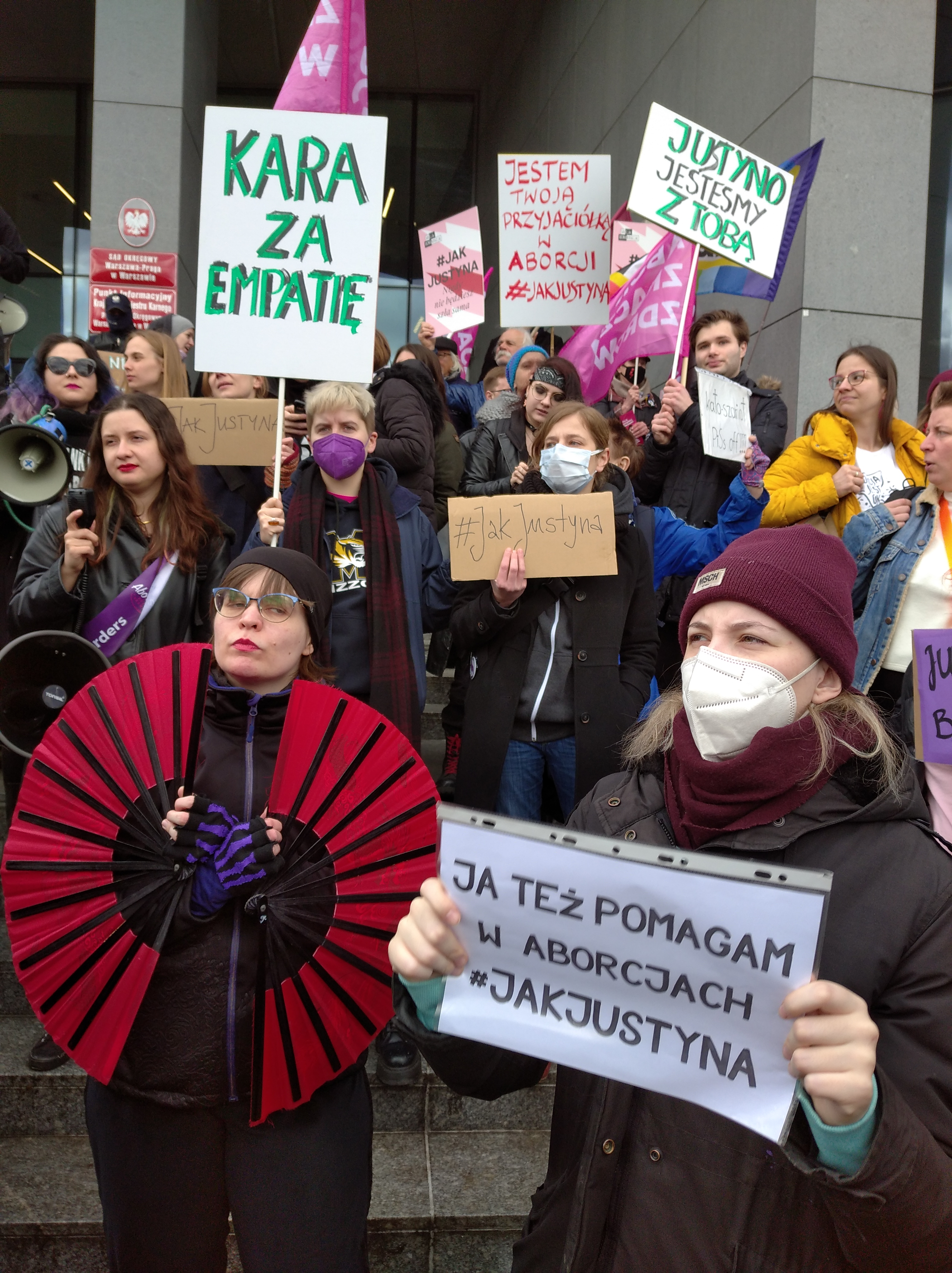
Demonstration in front of the Warsaw court in support of Justyna Wydrzyńska from ADT.

Abortion Dream Team (Polish: Aborcyjny Dream Team, ADT) is an abortion rights group in Poland. Headquartered in Warsaw, ADT was founded in October 2016. Volunteers with the group accept questions from women seeking abortion, and conduct workshops about how to administer mifepristone and misoprostol, a combination of drugs used in medical abortion.

== History ==
ADT is part of an abortion underground that has existed since 1993, when the Polish Parliament passed a law greatly restricting abortion at the request of the Polish Catholic Church. The organization takes its name from the 1992 United States men's Olympic basketball team, nicknamed "the Dream Team," because the founders of ADT viewed themselves as among the most talented people in the field of reproductive rights. It was founded by four women: Natalia Broniarczyk, Kinga Jelińska, Karolina Więckiewicz, and Justyna Wydrzyńska.

ADT cofounder Justyna Wydrzyńska was charged with a crime in 2022 for shipping abortion pills to a pregnant woman in an abusive relationship who was begging for the pills. Wydrzyńska faced a possible a three-year prison sentence for helping with abortion. She was the first activist to be charged under the law, and was convicted in March 2023 and sentenced to eight months of community service.

The American organization Shout Your Abortion considers ADT a sister organization. After a 2022 leaked draft opinion that would overturn the American court decision Roe v. Wade, Kinga Jelińska of ADT observed that the legal status of abortion in the US was coming to resemble Poland.

On March 8, 2025, the members of the Abortion Dream Team opened AboTak, the first abortion center in Poland. It is located at Wiejska Street 9, opposite to the Sejm. Justyna Wydrzyńska stated that the location was chosen on purpose to "remind politicians working just across the street about the abortion laws issue in Poland". Since the day the clinic opened, anti-abortion activists have been protesting outside. On April 25, unknown perpetrators threw butyric acid at the entrance to the clinic. After the fourth such incident, on November 24, two perpetrators were arrested. They were a man from Kaja Godek's anti-abortion organization Życie i Rodzina and his 18-year-old son.
