= Ola Kaczorek =

- Occupation: LGBT rights activist
- Known for: founding member of Consultative Council

Aleksandra Kaczorek, known as Ola Kaczorek, is a Polish LGBT rights activist. They are co-president of Love Does Not Exclude. In 2020, they became a founding member of the Consultative Council created on 1 November 2020 in the context of the October 2020 Polish protests.

== LGBT activism ==
In April 2020, Kaczorek criticised a proposed law that associated sex educators with pedophiles, arguing that sex educators teaching gender identity would risk prosecution, including prison sentences. They said that the already unfriendly psychological environment for non-heterosexual children would be worsened by the law.

Kaczorek is co-president of the LGBT rights group Love Does Not Exclude (Polish: Miłość Nie Wyklucza, MNW).

In 2019, the mayor of Warsaw, Rafał Trzaskowski, signed an "LGBT Declaration" of actions to support LGBT rights. In September 2020, Kaczorek claimed that out of the ten main actions, Trzaskowski only carried out one: he appeared and spoke publicly in favour of LGBT rights at the Warsaw Equality Parade. They stated the Warsaw City Council officials refused to create the position of a mayor's representative for LGBT issues, and either ignored or misled the activists on all the other points of the declaration.

Kaczorek criticised the declaration by several Polish local governments of LGBT-free zones as being discriminatory and argued that use of the term "LGBT ideology" was aimed at dehumanising LGBT people.

During the 2020 Polish presidential election, president Andrzej Duda proposed a constitutional change that would declare adoption of a child would be forbidden under single-sex couples. Kaczorek argued that while the proposal was negative in violating the family rights of LGBT couples, the proposal ironically declared the existence of LGBT couples, which contradicted the PiS claim that LGBT people were an "ideology" rather than people. Kaczorek moderated a debate on LGBT+ support at the July 2020 Pol'and'Rock Festival.

In July and August 2020, Małgorzata Szutowicz (Margot) and two other LGBT rights activists placed rainbow flags on a statue of Jesus and four other statues in Warsaw and were charged with the criminal offence of insulting a monument. Kaczorek stated that they were helping to raise funds for the legal defence of Margot and the other activists.

== Constitutional Council ==
Kaczorek was a founding member of the Consultative Council created on 1 November 2020 in the context of the October 2020 Polish protests.
