= Nadia Oleszczuk =

Polish activist and founding member of the Consultative Council of Poland

- Born: c. 2000
- Alma mater: SGH Warsaw School of Economics
- Occupation: Activist
- Known for: member of Polish Consultative Council
- Spouse(s): Jan Oleszczuk-Zygmuntowski

Nadia Oleszczuk is an activist in Poland who became a founding member of the Consultative Council created on 1 November 2020 in the context of the October–November 2020 Polish protests. Oleszczuk's role in the Council covers workers' rights issues including workforce casualisation and wages for housework.

== Childhood and education ==
Oleszczuk was a member of the XIIIth sitting of the Polish Parliament of Children and Youth. In September 2017, she was chosen as the Lubusz Voivodeship representative on the Ministry of Education's Children and Youth Council of the Polish Republic. Oleszczuk attended the Stanisław Staszic Lyceum (high school) in Rzepin, studying her final year during the 2018/2019 academic year.

== Activism ==
In August 2020, Oleszczuk signed the appeal of students and faculty of the University of Warsaw objecting to the closing of the main gate of the university that had occurred when police attacked protestors during the August 2020 LGBT protests in Poland.

In October 2020, Oleszczuk became a member of the youth committee of the Trade Union Alternative (Polish: Związkowa Alternatywa).

During the 2022 Ukrainian refugee crisis that occurred as a result of the 2022 Russian invasion of Ukraine, Oleszczuk was programme coordinator and president of the youth section of UNI Global Union's Polish affiliate All-Poland Alliance of Trade Unions KP. She stated that many Ukrainian women refugees in Poland needed help to negotiate with employers to obtain their rights under Polish labour law.

In 2022, Oleszczuk was classified as a finalist in Forbes' "25 under 25" ranking for social activists.

== Consultative Council ==
On 1 November 2020, Oleszczuk became a founding member of the Consultative Council of Poland, for the topic of women working on temporary contracts. Oleszczuk described her selection for the position stating, "You could say that a place was made for me because I'm a young woman and I should fight for my rights". Do Rzeczy stated that Oleszczuk was a replacement for her partner, Jan Zygmuntowski, in the Council.

Oleszczuk stated that one of the main aims of the protests was to change attitudes to abortion, so that it is seen as an ordinary medical treatment.

Our minimum plan is that people should stop saying bad things about abortion. Society should accept that the [abortion] procedure happens and will continue to happen. People should stop judging women who carry out [abortions].

— Nadia Oleszczuk, Interview on Radio ZET

During a Consultative Council press conference on 24 November 2020, Oleszczuk summarised Council working group discussions on the topic of women workers' rights. She stated that pressure was needed against employers who employed workers on temporary contracts (umowa zlecenia and umowa o dzieło) for doing work that should really be carried out under regular full-time work law. Oleszczuk commented that women working on dead-end jobs (Polish: śmieciowce) missed out on their right to parental leave. She reported on proposals for insurance rights for trainees and funding for young people prior to their first work contracts. Oleszczuk described the situation of the precariat as "twenty-first century slavery" and said that it had to be ended.

On 1 December, Oleszczuk stated that proposals under discussion by the Council included a shorter work day for women to counter the "second shift" (women's greater work pressure to succeed and workload while formally working equal numbers of hours to men); and wages for housework, a demand by women to be paid for their unpaid housework, organised as a campaign started in 1972 by Selma James.

== Points of view ==
In a July 2022 interview with Wysokie Obcasy, Oleszczuk described herself as favouring social feminism.
