= Mirosława Makuchowska =

Polish LGBT rights activist

- Alma mater: University of Wrocław
- Occupation: LGBT rights activist
- Known for: one of the directors of KPH, founding member of Consultative Council

Mirosława Makuchowska (also: Mirka Makuchowska) is a Polish LGBT rights activist. In 2020 she became a founding member of the Consultative Council created on 1 November 2020 in the context of the October 2020 Polish protests.

== Childhood and education ==
Makuchowska graduated in sociology from the University of Wrocław.

== Activism ==
Makuchowska has been a member of the LGBT rights organisation Campaign Against Homophobia (KPH) since 2005. She has been one of the directors of KPH since 2013 or earlier and continued in the role as of 2020. During 2012–2014 she was on the board of ILGA-Europe.

In 2013, when proposed legislation for civil unions for LGBT couples was rejected, Makuchowska stated that there was strong popular support for individual LGBT couples' rights, including the right to information about one's partner's health when hospitalised, inheritance rights and right to manage one's partner's funeral arrangements.

In December 2018 during an ILGA-Europe meeting in Brussels, stated that Polish schools had been forced by the Ministry of Education to cancel school activities aimed at promoting tolerance. Makuchowska said that the use of hate speech in relation to sexual preferences increased during the rule of the governing party Law and Justice (PiS), encouraging the use of anti-LGBT physical violence such as throwing stones.

In 2019, Makuchowska criticised the declaration by several Polish local governments of LGBT-free zones, which sent a "disturbing message" to local citizens. She described PiS politicians' opposition to LGBT rights as a campaigning technique similar to its 2015 opposition to refugee rights. During the 2020 Polish presidential election campaigning period, Makuchowska stated that Andrzej Duda, the incumbent president, used homophobia as a scapegoat to try to gain votes and that physical violence against LGBT people increased in response.

Makuchowska participated in the August 2020 LGBT protests in Warsaw related to the arrest of Stop Bzdurom founder Małgorzata Szutowicz. Makuchowska's back was bruised when she was pushed to the ground by police during the event. She judged that community support for LGBT rights was growing in Poland at time.

== Constitutional Council ==
Makuchowska became a founding member of the Consultative Council created on 1 November 2020 in the context of the October 2020 Polish protests.
