= Consultative Council =

Consultative Council may refer to:

- Consultative Council (Bahrain), the semi-elected upper house of the legislative body of Bahrain
- Consultative Council (Poland), a council created by All-Poland Women's Strike in the context of the Polish protests that started in October 2020
