= Kinga Łozińska =

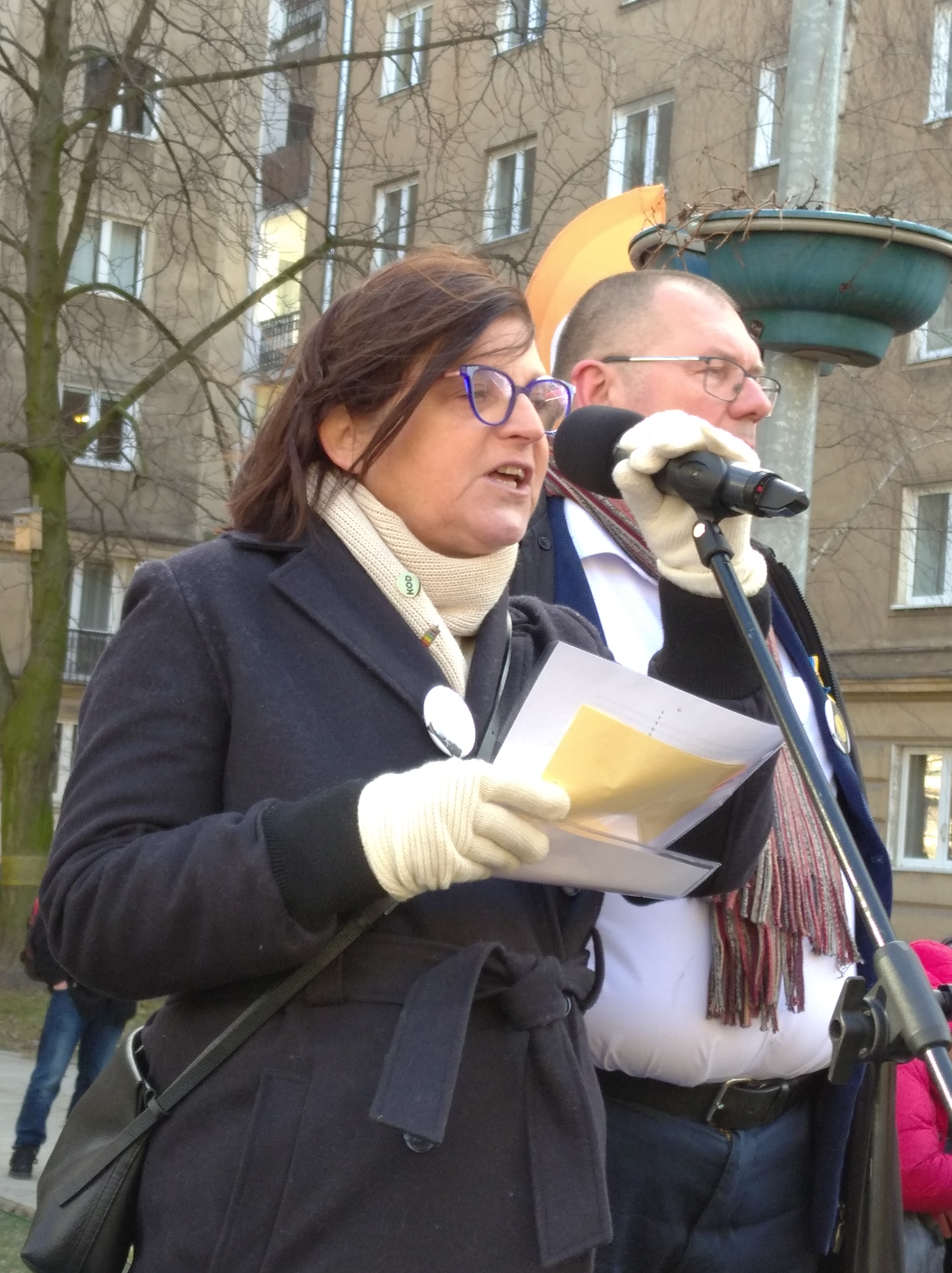
- Born: 1961
- Education: Jagiellonian University
- Occupation: Activist
- Known for: KOD activist, founding member of Consultative Council

Kinga Łozińska is a Polish activist. As of 2020, she was the Mazovian representative of the Committee for the Defence of Democracy (KOD) and a vice-president of KOD. On 1 November 2020 she became a founding member of the Consultative Council that was established in the context of the October 2020 Polish protests.

== Childhood and education ==
Łozińska graduated with a degree in ethnography at the Jagiellonian University.

== Management career ==
Łozińska started a business career in 1992. As of 2019, she was on the control board of the Green Caffe Nero. As of 2020, Łozińska is the chief executive officer of a professional mobility service for medical professionals, Paragona. Łozińska argues that formal mobility laws in the European Union are not sufficient in themselves due to the practical need to learn local languages and medical management procedures.

== Activism ==
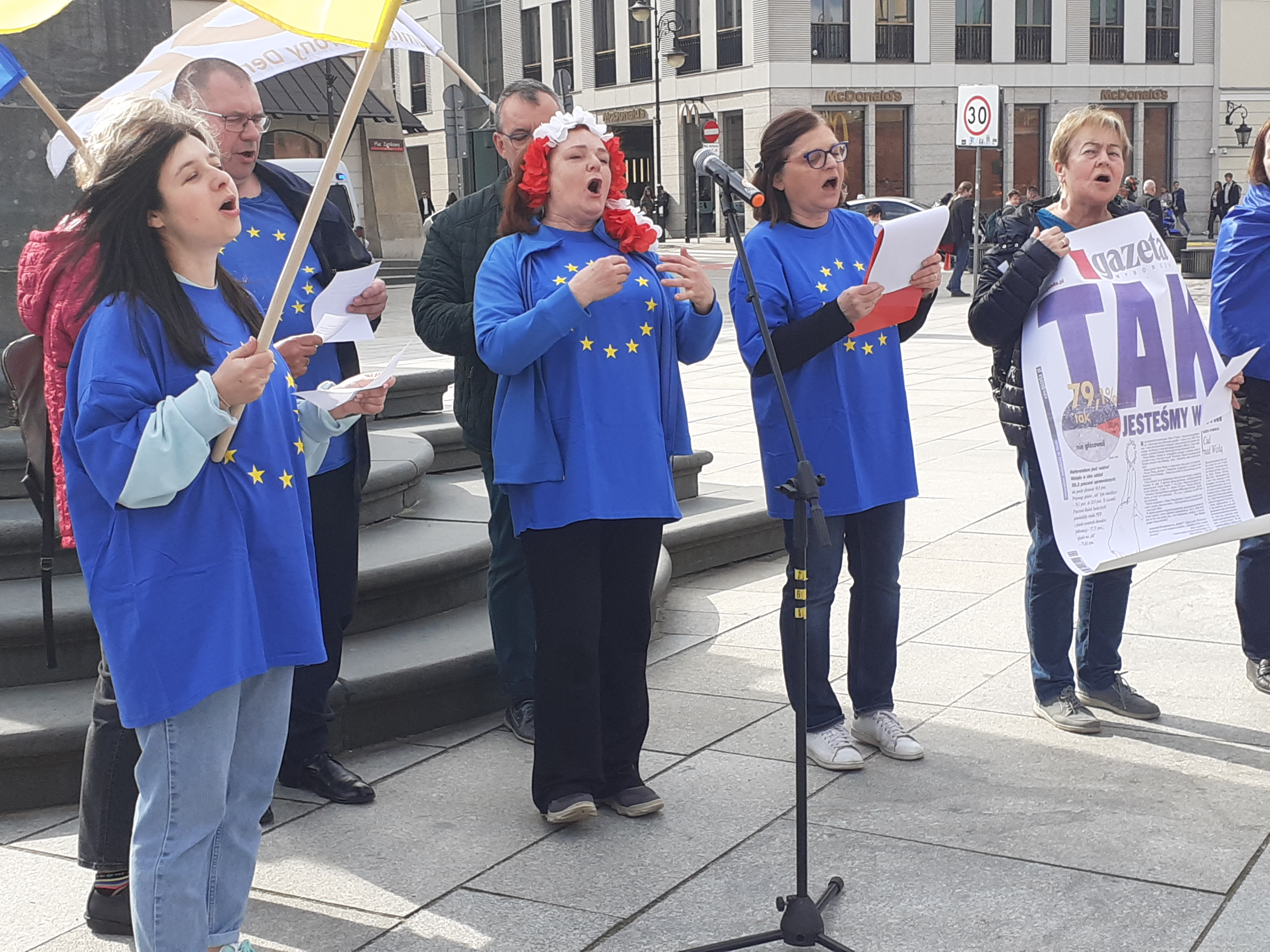
Kinga Łozińska - third from the left - while singing Ode to Joy in Warsaw (2023).

In September 2020, Łozińska was elected as the Mazovian representative of the Committee for the Defence of Democracy (KOD) and became one of the two vice-presidents of KOD. Actions that she took in the name of KOD included a December 2018 protest in front of the Hungarian embassy objecting to a new Hungarian law that allowed employers to force workers to work overtime.

On 1 November 2020, Łozińska became one of the founding members of the Consultative Council that was created in the context of the October 2020 Polish protests.
