= Monika Płatek =

Polish legal scholar, criminologist, and politician

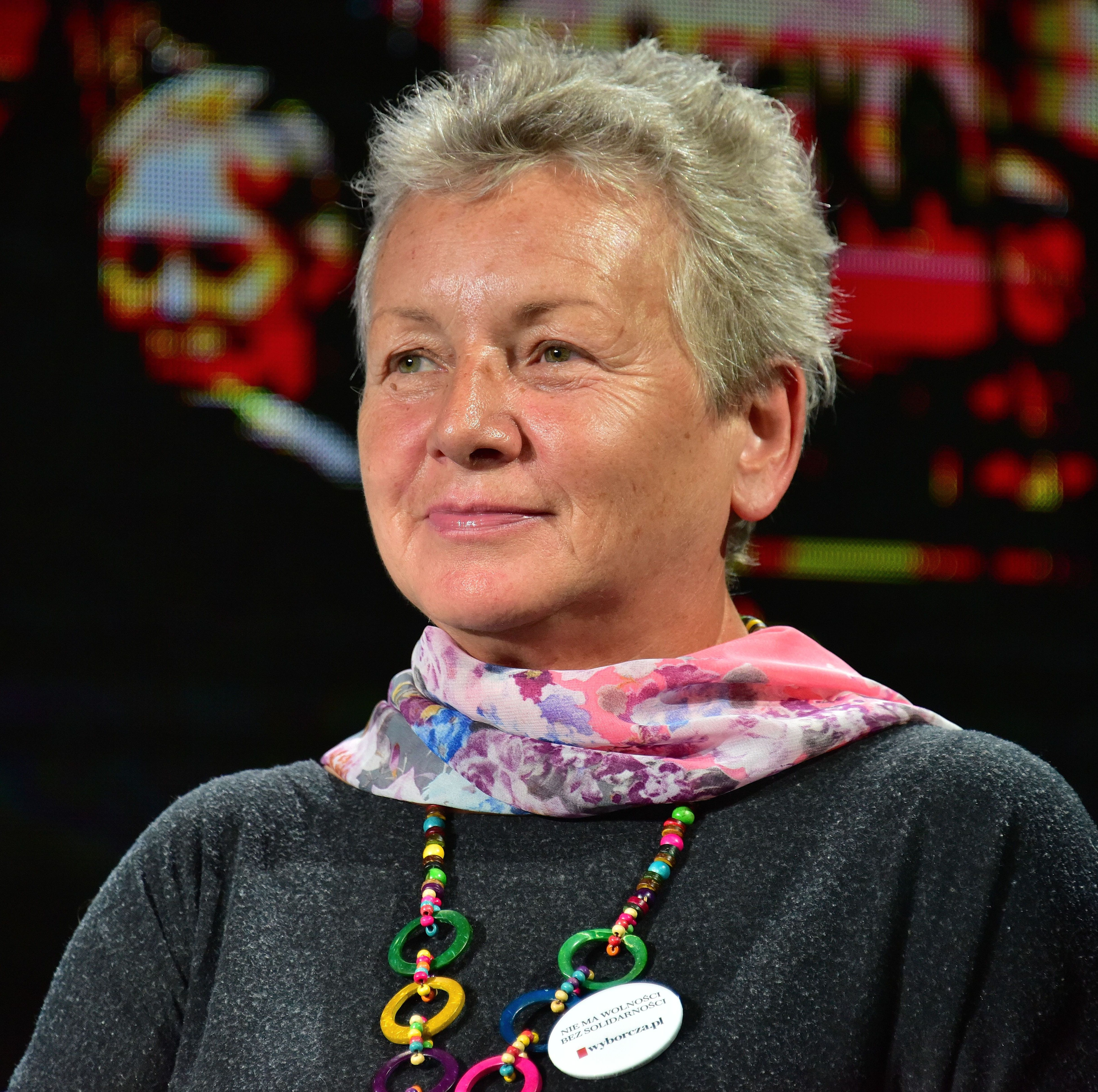
- Monika Płatek in Warsaw (2019)
- Occupations: Lawyer; Legal scholar; Criminologist
- Awards: Knight's Cross of the Order of Polonia Restituta

Monika Stanisława Płatek is a Polish legal scholar, criminologist, and politician. She is a professor at the University of Warsaw, and her research focuses on penal systems, criminal and civil law, gender studies, and feminist jurisprudence. She has been a candidate for the Senate of Poland and the European Parliament.

== Education ==
Płatek attended the University of Warsaw, where in 1976 she graduated from the Faculty of Law and Administration. In 1992 she completed a doctorate with the thesis Przyczyny niepowodzenia okresu próby przy warunkowym przedterminowym zwolnieniu (Reasons for the failure of the probationary period under conditional early release). In 2008 she completed a habilitation in law for the work Systemy penitencjarne państw skandynawskich na tle polityki kryminalnej, karnej i penitencjarnej (Penitentiary systems of the Scandinavian countries against the background of criminal, penal and penitentiary policy) at the University of Warsaw.

== Career ==
In 1976, Płatek began working in the Department of Criminology in the Faculty of Law and Administration of the University of Warsaw. In 2008 she became an associate professor, and later a University Professor. She has also served as head of the criminology department, and deputy director of the Institute of Criminal Law at the University of Warsaw. Płatek specializes in criminal and civil law, the penal system of Poland in comparison to other countries, and criminal and civil law. She also focuses on feminist jurisprudence and gender studies in criminology.

In 1994 Płatek founded the Polish Association for Legal Education, of which she then served as the president. She has also been a board member of the Panoptykon Foundation, an anti-mass surveillance human rights NGO, and the board for the Osiatyński Archive, a legal archive.

In 2015, Płatek ran for the Senate of Poland on behalf of the United Left coalition, receiving 13% of the vote. In 2019, she ran for the European Parliament on the list of the political party Spring.

In 2020, she hosted a broadcast on Halo Radio. That same year she was a member of the Consultative Council.

Płatek was awarded the Knight's Cross of the Order of Polonia Restituta by Bronisław Komorowski in 2012.

== Selected awards ==
- Knight's Cross of the Order of Polonia Restituta (2012)

== Selected works ==
- "Europejskie Reguły Więzienne a polskie prawo i praktyka penitencjarna", Studia Luridica (1997)
- "Hostages of destiny: Gender issues in today's Poland", Feminist Review (2004)
- Systemy penitencjarne państw skandynawskich (2007)
- "Kryminologiczno-epistemologiczne i genderowe aspekty przestępstwa zgwałcenia", Archiwum kryminologii (2010)
- "Zgwałcenie. Gdy termin nabiera nowej treści. Pozorny brak zmian i jego skutki", Archiwum kryminologii (2018)
