= Katarzyna Bierzanowska =

Polish activist

- Occupation: Activist
- Known for: disability rights activism, member of Consultative Council

Katarzyna Bierzanowska is a Polish disability rights activist who founded the Pełnoprawna initiative. In 2020 she became a founding member of the Consultative Council created on 1 November 2020 in the context of the October 2020 Polish protests.

== Childhood and education ==
Bierzanowska graduated in applied linguistics.

== Personal disability ==
In 2019, Bierzanowska had had an illness weakening her leg muscles for over a decade. She had earlier raised money on the Internet to obtain an electric wheelchair to give her mobility. Needing renovations to her residence in order to have facilities enabling her to live normally, she applied for funds from the Polish State Disabled Persons Rehabilitation Fund (PFRON). She was informed that the delay would be more than a year. Since her illness was progressing, she successfully appealed for funds on the Internet.

== Disabled rights activism ==
Bierzanowska founded the Pełnoprawna (English: Full rights) initiative on Facebook opposing discrimination against the disabled.

Bierzanowska is a co-founder of the Article 6 Collective, an informal group of disabled women and their supporters.

Bierzanowska stated that about 12% of Poles were disabled according to 2011 official statistics, including about half of those over the age of 60, typically with sight or hearing problems. In 2018 she judged the support for the disabled in Poland to be vastly inadequate. She argued that providing full practical rights to the disabled was "everybody's" responsibility.

On 17 May 2018, during the month-long strikes in front of the Sejm, the Polish lower house of parliament, to defend the rights of the disabled, Bierzanowska participated in a public debate on the issues of "what disabled people actually require and how [they] can avoid serious issues becoming party political playthings in the battle for the ballot box."

== Consultative Council ==
In 2020 Bierzanowska became a founding member of the Consultative Council created on 1 November 2020 in the context of the October 2020 Polish protests.
