= Katarzyna Pikulska =

Polish doctor and health funding activist

- Alma mater: Medical University of Warsaw
- Occupation: Medical doctor
- Known for: Health funding activism, founding member of Consultative Council

Katarzyna Pikulska is a Polish doctor and health funding activist. In 2020 she became a founding member of the Consultative Council created on 1 November 2020 in the context of the October 2020 Polish protests.

== Childhood and education ==
Pikulska graduated from the Medical University of Warsaw in 2010, specialising in orthopedic surgery.

== Medical career ==
As of October 2017, Pikulska was a resident doctor in orthopedics at a hospital in Lublin.

Pikulska carried out a medical mission in the Kurdistan Region of Iraq in 2016. She spent a month of the mission in field hospitals twenty kilometres from the frontline of the Iraq–ISIL War. She went on her second international medical mission in Tanzania.

In 2018 she planned to travel to Western Africa on her third international medical visit to provide medical help. She described her aim as working "where people really need help, where doctors' work is highly valued" because she enjoys her work.

== Medical activism ==
=== 2017 trainee doctors' protest ===
Pikulska is a member of the All-Poland Doctors' Trade Union (Polish: Ogólnopolskiego Związku Zawodowego Lekarzy) (OZZL), which was involved in a hunger strike that started on 2 October 2017 by twenty doctors at a children's hospital in Warsaw. According to Pikulska, the trigger for the strike was the death from overwork of four doctors in Poland within a single week. One of the deceased doctors had been Pikulska's colleague who had returned home after a 37-hour shift.

The doctors wanted state financing of the health budget to be raised to 6.8 percent of the Polish gross domestic product within three years, and to 9 percent within ten years. They also wanted reduced bureaucracy, shorter queues, more medical personnel, better working conditions and higher salaries.

A meeting of the health commission of the Sejm, the lower house of the Polish parliament, visited the hospital. Pikulska stated that the striking doctors would participate in the sitting "only and uniquely as observers". She stated that the doctors weren't politicians and didn't want to become politicians. She claimed that politicians had tried to politicise the protest for two years and had failed. She and other doctors wore t-shirts displaying the words "hunger strike". They suspended their hunger strike during the meeting, which failed to find a solution to the doctors' demands.

On 14 October, Telewizja Polska (TVP) reacted to the protests by publishing a claim on News that Pikulska and the other protesting doctors were rich, took luxurious holidays in exotic countries, drove expensive cars, and lived on caviar and wine, based on photos found on the World Wide Web.

Pikulska stated that the car was borrowed for a few hours and that she recently sold her 20-year old car and bought a 10-year old car. She stated that she had been in Kurdistan and Tanzania as part of Polish medical help programs, one directly managed by the Polish Ministry of Foreign Affairs. OKO.press stated that TVP had in 2016 reported on her mission to Erbil in the Kurdistan Region of Iraq.

Pikulska stated that the TVP report resulted in a wave of cyberbullying aiming to blacken her name and distract attention from the protests. Pikulska described an apology from the head of TVP on Twitter as insufficient for reaching the general public, and that the apology should be broadcast in normal TVP programming. Pikulska sued TVP, with the first court sittings scheduled on 19 November 2019 and 16 April 2020.

The overall hunger strike continued to 30 October 2017. Pikulska fasted for nine days. It gained support from associations of other medical specialties, with 200 people hunger-striking around Poland.

=== Skalpel ===
During 2019–2020, Pikulska was head of the surgeons' association Surgeons' Guild Skalpel (Polish: Porozumienie Chirurgów Skalpel).

=== COVID-19 pandemic ===
In April 2020 during the COVID-19 pandemic in Poland, Skalpel, with Pikulska as leader, made an official complaint to an official medical ombudsperson against the voivode of Masovia, Konstanty Radziwiłł and the Minister of Health Łukasz Szumowski, accusing them of infecting patients and medical personnel, thereby risk the patients' and medical personnel's health and lives; violating the Doctors' Code of Ethics; and, in the case of Szumowski, failing to carry out his ministerial responsibilities. Specific accusations included "irresponsible support" for holding the 2020 Polish presidential election with the help of postal ballots; "lies about doctors"; "falsifying the state of the epidemic in Poland". Pikulska stated that the "whole medical community" disagreed with Szumowski's recommendation that the election could be held, and considered the recommendation as a deliberate creation of risk of infecting Poles and making them ill. She stated that if the election were held, then it would violate Polish law and that the government should be punished for it. Pikulska stated that the numbers of infections from SARS-CoV-2 and deaths from COVID-19 were underestimated. Pikulska stated that the government was violating Article 165 of the Polish Penal Code and called for Szumowski and Minister of Justice Zbigniew Ziobro to resign.

In July 2020, Pikulska spoke to the media ahead of a planned medical personnel strike on 8 August calling for Polish health funding to be increased to at least 6.8 percent of the Polish GDP. Pikulska described the health system situation in Poland as critical. She stated that "money was wasted on uncontrolled purchases of medical equipment" and that "patients [were] dying in queues, because of chaos and disorganisation in the health system".

=== 2022 Russian invasion of Ukraine ===
During the 2022 full-scale Russian invasion of Ukraine, Pikulska supported Ukrainian hospitals by providing equipment to hospitals in Lviv, Tarnopol and near Vinnytsia, and by helping to evacuate patients.

== Consultative Council ==
In 2020, Pikulska was one of the founding members of the Consultative Council that was created on 1 November 2020 in the context of the October 2020 Polish protests. On 6 November, she stated that if the government refused to resign, a general strike would be announced.

== See also ==
- Health advocacy
