= Sebastian Słowiński =

Polish poet and minority rights activist

- Born: 1998; Poznań
- Occupation: Poet, human rights defender
- Known for: founding member of Consultative Council

Sebastian Słowiński is a Polish poet and minority rights activist. In 2020 he became a founding member of the Consultative Council created on 1 November 2020 in the context of the October 2020 Polish protests.

== Childhood ==
Słowiński was born in 1998 (age 26–27) in Poznań. He attended lyceum at the Wielokulturowe Liceum Humanistyczne im. Jacka Kuronia in Warsaw. Słowiński identifies as pan-sexual. Prior to his declaration of his sexuality, he experienced physical aggression for his appearance. After he outed himself, he was physically assaulted by his school friends in a bus.

In 2017, Słowiński's final year of lyceum, he was a laureate of the Polish Philosophy Olympiad (national version of the International Philosophy Olympiad). After receiving his formal prize certificate from the Olympiad committee, he refused to accept a public prize for his win from the mayor of Warsaw, Hanna Gronkiewicz–Waltz. Słowiński stated that he refused to accept the prize from Gronkiewicz–Waltz was because she had refused to participate in the Warsaw Equality Parade. He claimed that the Warsaw City Council was interested in gentrification of the city for rich residents and uninterested in the LGBT rights nor the rights of the poor.

As of April 2019, Słowiński was a student in the Interdisciplinary Individual Humanistic and Social Studies (Polish: Międzyobszarowych Indywidualnych Studiów Humanistycznych i Społecznych, MISH) program at the University of Warsaw.

== Activism ==
In 2018, Słowiński was a member of the Student Antifascist Committee (Polish: Studencki Komitet Antyfaszystowski) group. On 1 March 2018, the group, including physics lecturer Rafał Suszek, blocked a parade in Warsaw by the National Radical Camp (ONR). Słowiński stated that police physically assaulted him and other group members after the group had terminated their protest action, with violence including kicking the activists' legs, choaking them and punching their faces. Słowiński stated that he himself received a punch in the face and a kick in the groin from police officers. Amnesty International listed the incident as part of a pattern of "alleged excessive use of force by the police" in Poland against protestors in 2017 and 2018. A letter of support for the protestors and opposing police violence was later signed by 150 Polish and international academics.

Słowiński stated that the Student Antifascist Committee was created in response to the distributions of fascist leaflets in the corridors of the University of Warsaw. Some of the leaflets spoke positively of Benito Mussolini, stated that Mussolini was not an enemy of Poland, and that the Roman salute was acceptable because it was used by the Romans; some of the leaflest were antisemitic.

In June 2018, Słowinski and other activists started a sit-in on the balcony of Kazimierz Palace at the University of Warsaw (UW) in protest against the major changes to the Law on Tertiary Education and Science (Poland) (Law 2.0, Polish: Ustawa 2.0), in defence of university autonomy. The UW Kazimiercz Palace balcony protest sparked off protests at universities around Poland.

On 17 December 2018, Słowiński carried out an anti-clerical protest at UW by placing paper figures representing known figures of the Catholic Church, accusing them of pedophilia, hiding incidents of pedophilia, antisemitism and nationalism. MISH students lodged a complaint against him.

=== Constitutional Council ===
Słowiński was a founding member of the Consultative Council created on 1 November 2020 in the context of the October 2020 Polish protests.

== Works ==
Słowiński's book Second Act, published in 2014, was described at the time by its publisher Warszawska Firma Wydawnictwa as "one of the most interesting debuts of recent years".

== Views ==
=== Alienation ===
Słowiński blames Adam Michnik and "other fathers of the Third Polish Republic" for alienating young Poles from political participation.

=== Nationalism ===
Słowiński says that he accepts to call himself "anti-Polish". He argues that nationalism is "responsible for crimes against humanity, limits freedom, and is oppressive by being heteronormative and patriarchal. Słowiński stated that "national pride" is a fiction, but that many people in Poland wished to have such a myth. He cited the conspiracy theory of Turboslavs, a mythical Polish empire that predated the 966 Christianization of Poland, as an example of the effect of nationalistic desire.

=== Antifascism ===
Słowiński views antifascism as "not an ideology". He stated that antifascists show that reality is complicated and that "diversity is a strength rather than a threat". He stated that antifascists see every individual as having the right to making his/her own choices, within a community spirit, and where people count as "much more than objects of neoliberalism".

== Personal life ==
Słowiński stated in 2018 that his parents and grandparents supported his human rights activism, but were worried about the personal risks.
