= Kaja Godek =

Polish ultra-conservative activist

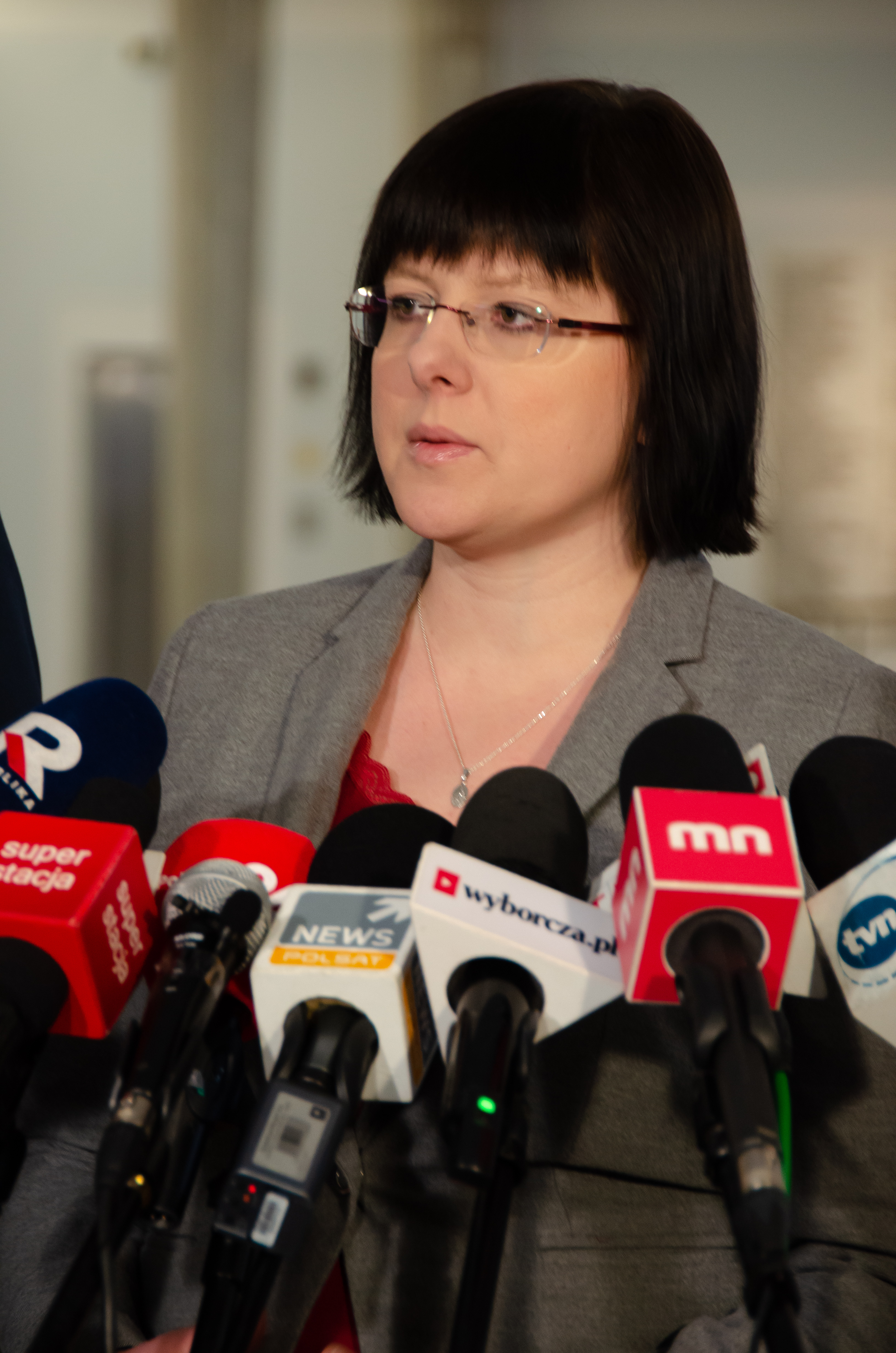
- Godek in 2019
- Born: 2 May 1982 (age 44); Warsaw
- Education: University of Warsaw

Kaja Godek (born 2 May 1982) is a Polish ultra-conservative activist and leader of the foundation Życie i Rodzina ("life and family"). She proposed a law to ban the abortion of fetuses with birth defects or high probability thereof (Stop aborcji) in 2013 and a law to ban LGBT marches (Stop LGBT) in 2021.

The anti-abortion proposal did not pass the first parliamentary reading while the anti-LGBT proposal did and is to be worked on by parliamentary committees. Presenting her anti-LGBT project in the lower house of Poland's parliament (the Sejm), Godek claimed that LGBT activists pay children to attend their parades.

In 2016, she registered the Życie i Rodzina foundation. YouTube blocked the account of said foundation in 2019 for inciting hate. In 2019, Godek ran for the European Parliament for the far-right Confederation Liberty and Independence, but failed to obtain a seat.

== Political positions ==
=== Abortion ===
In 2013, Kaja Godek proposed a ban on the abortion of fetuses with genetic defects or a high probability thereof. She equated abortion with killing babies. The proposal was discussed in the Sejm after gathering sufficient signatures, and rejected at the first hearing.

=== LGBT rights ===
In 2018, Kaja Godek called gay people perverts on live TV (Polsat), leading to a defamation lawsuit which was dismissed by the court, because she supposedly had not addressed the gay plaintiffs directly. This ruling was overturned later by a higher court, meaning Godek faces another trial in 2022. In 2018, Godek also called Leo Varadkar, a gay Irish-Indian politician and at the time Taoiseach (head of government) of Ireland, a pervert.

In 2019, Godek declared that gay people want to adopt children to rape and molest them. In 2021, Godek told Bart Staszewski, an LGBT rights campaigner, that he abuses children and that he disgusts her, which led Staszewski to file a libel suit.

Godek's 2021 proposal Stop LGBT would ban LGBT marches. It was supported by the Polish Catholic Church and gathered 140,000 signatures, surpassing the 100,000 required for a Sejm debate. The bill was debated in the first of three readings on 29 October 2021, and passed to the next stage with 235 yes votes (205 no votes, 1 abstention). Said stage consists in the bill being discussed by parliamentary committees. The German newspaper Der Tagesspiegel called it "questionable" whether the proposal would return to parliament from there before the 2023 parliamentary election, and come into force. It added that "many experts" doubt that the law is compatible with European Union law.

Polish law does not protect LGBT people against discrimination, except in the field of employment.

=== Vaccines ===
Godek in September 2021 discussed the use of aborted fetal tissues to produce vaccines.
