= Consultative Council (Poland) =

Non-government council in Poland created in 2020

The Consultative Council (Polish: Rada Konsultacyjna) was a non-government representative body created in November 2020 by the All-Poland Women's Strike (Polish: Ogólnopolski Strajk Kobiet, OSK) in the context of the October 2020 Polish protests. The Council aimed to incorporate public participation as a mechanism for participatory democracy.

== Creation ==
On 27 October 2020, during the October 2020 Polish protests, All-Poland Women's Strike (OSK) stated that it intended to create a Consultative Council similar to the Coordination Council created during the 2020 Belarusian protests, with the aim of working on "how to clean up the mess created by PiS". The Council was created on 1 November 2020.

== Structure ==
Klementyna Suchanow described the Council as a "social movement", not a political party. She stated that it did not have a "first secretary and committee" in the style of the Polish People's Republic, and that it was not the base for forming a political party.

In 2023, Agnieszka Kampka and Dániel Oross described the Council as a case of public participation in decision-making in the context of constitutional and local decision-making processes in Hungary and Poland.

=== Membership ===
As of 1 November 2020, the Council members were Barbara Labuda, Beata Chmiel, Danuta Kuroń, Jacek Wiśniewski (Mazovian branch of the Committee for the Defence of Democracy, KOD), Robert Hojda (founder of the Congress of Citizens' Democratic Movements), Mirosława Makuchowska (active in Campaign Against Homophobia), Bożena Przyłuska, Dorota Łoboda, Katarzyna Bierzanowska, Monika Płatek, Michał Boni, Piotr Szumlewicz, Sebastian Słowiński, Paweł Kasprzak, Kinga Łozińska (Mazovian branch of KOD), Dominika Lasota, Nadia Oleszczuk, Katarzyna Pikulska, Aleksandra Kaczorek, Roman Kurkiewicz and Karolina Micuła.

== Aims ==
OSK states that the aims of the Coordination Council were gathered from the concerns and goals most frequently raised by participants in the October protests. Monika Płatek stated that the Council was created ad hoc to collect together the demands of the protestors; to be of service, to work out how to best implement the demands from the streets, and not to "govern, impose or set boundaries". She stated that OSK did not start the protests on 22 October 2020 but instead joined them, and that the Council was needed to help the grassroots protestors implement their demands.

The Council called for the resignation for the government. It described its aims as "a way out of the collapse in 13 key areas". Its strategies on how to carry out changes in Poland included:

- abortion in Poland, women's rights in Poland, alimony
  - Klementyna Suchanow from OSK described the aims in terms of abortion as "legal abortion on-demand end of the story" (Polish: Żądamy legalnej aborcji na żądanie i kropka).
- LGBT rights in Poland
- secularism and the removal of religious teaching in schools
- independence of the public service from political parties
- the climate crisis
- short-term employment contracts with weak workers' rights ("rubbish contracts", Polish: śmieciówki)
- animal rights
- education
- health services
- delegalisation of neo-fascist fighters' groups (Polish: bojówkami "faszyzującymi")
- restoring psychiatric services
- support for the disabled
- opposing propaganda and disinformation.

Council member Nadia Oleszczuk stated on 5 November 2020 that the protest actions would not "shift online". She stated that even if they quietened for some time, they would return as long as unsatisfied social demands remained.

== Tactics and methods ==
The Council accepted to negotiate the conditions of the government's resignation, provided that the negotiation did not take place "by pepper spray" (Polish: za pomocą gazu). Monika Płatek stated that she hoped that PiS included people who disagreed with Kai Godek's call to send soldiers and police to destroy the protestors and disagreed with Jarosław Kaczyński's call to send extreme-right hooligans to attack the protestors.

On 14 November 2020, Klementyna Suchanow stated that two of the Council's immediate demands, the dismissal of Minister of Education and Science Przemysław Czarnek and medical personnel's demand for an increase of the fraction of the GDP spent on health services, had been ignored by PiS. Talks were under way for planning a general strike by doctors in response. Suchanow described the negotiations on strike planning as "very positive". Nadia Oleszczuk stated that the anger in Poland was so great that if the demands were not satisfied, the protests would escalate.

On 22 December, Suchanow stated that the Consultative Council's work in searching for solutions to Polish problems would be extended to a public decision-making component, consisting of online discussions on proposals, using the Loomio decision-making software with the main Loomio domain name, running on Cloudflare servers. The launch of the Council's Loomio decision-making included proposals on five themes: women's rights, work, secularisation, education and climate. The deadline for the initial five themes was set to 15 January 2021.

Humanity in Action described the public participation as the second stage of what it saw an "all-encompassing and inclusive approach".

== Proposals ==
On 24 November 2020, the Council summarised key points in six of the topics worked on by 400 of the 800 people collecting together proposals via the Council's infrastructure.

On childbirth care, Marta Lempart of OSK stated that the Parliamentary Committee on Childbirth Care, composed of three members of Confederation Liberty and Independence, should be replaced or augmented by "people who really care about women's rights".

Lempart stated that the system of verifying alimony payments had "totally collapsed" during the COVID-19 pandemic and that prosecutors and police should carry out their responsibilities in enforcing alimony payments.

Dorota Łoboda stated that for educational issues, the most common demand was the resignation of Przemysław Czarnek, the Science and Education minister. Łoboda described Czarnek as "incompetent, homophobic and misogynist" and stated that the educational community was in revolt against Czarnek. She referred to a petition signed by 90,000 people and "terror [by Czarnek] on an unprecedented scale" and "repression against university students, school pupils and teachers who participated in public demonstrations" and against those displayed the red lightning symbol of OSK.

Katarzyna Pikulska stated that the main demand on health issues continued to be an increase on the financing of health from 4.7% to 10% of the GDP, "the European level". She referred to the insufficient levels of COVID-19 testing, lack of information on several different COVID-19 related issues, the lack of appropriate salaries for medical personnel handling the COVID-19 pandemic, the lack of access to contraception, and the lack of science-based sex education. Pikulska expressed hope that the government would introduce the Council's demands immediately.

On workers' rights, Oleszczuk stated that pressure was needed against employers who employed workers on temporary contracts (umowa zlecenia and umowa o dzieło) for doing work that should really be carried out under regular full-time work law. She commented that women working on dead-end jobs (Polish: śmieciowce) missed out on their right to parental leave. She reported on proposals for insurance rights for trainees and funding for young people prior to their first work contracts. Oleszczuk described the situation of the precariat as "twenty-first century slavery" and said that it had to be ended. She added in a 1 December interview that one of the proposals being considered was wages for housework.

Bożena Przyłuska presented the Council's policies on secularism. Przyłuska and OSK stated that secularism did not involve "fighting against" religion, but was opposed to "clericalisation of the state" and "immunity from criminal prosecution of the clergy". Przyłuska described a demand for "dejohnpaulisation of schools", stating that 1500 schools were officially named after former Polish pope John Paul II, effecting forming a cult. Przyłuska declared that the Council would support children forced to attend religious instruction classes by helping them discuss the issue with their parents. She referred to the "nightmare of [children] hearing [during religious instruction] that their LGBT friends are not humans, but only an ideology". She encouraged parents and children to use existing legal rights to "quit from religion any time during the school year" stating that "if someone refuses [to allow quitting religious instruction class], it's a lie, it's not true".

== Threats against Council members ==
Members of the Consultative Council were sent bomb threats by email in March 2021. In February and March 2021, one of the Consultative Council members receiving nine threatening emails, including bomb threats. Three weeks following her report of the threats to the police, the police said that her case was in pending status. Human Rights Watch (HRW) presented evidence suggesting that the threats were part of a wider campaign of repression and that police didn't respond adequately. HRW wrote to Polish authorities on 24 March 2021 about the results of its research and requested an official response. As of 31 March 2021, it had not received a response.

HRW, Civicus and International Planned Parenthood Federation-European Network described the threats against the Council members as part of a wider campaign that also targeted members of six other organisations, "escalating risks to women's human rights defenders" in Poland.
