= Barbara Labuda =

Polish politician and diplomat (born 1946)

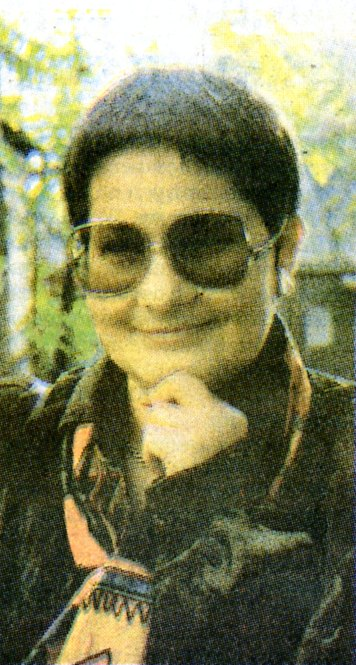
- Labuda in 1990
- Born: 1946 (age 79–80)
- Occupations: Politician; Activist; Philologist; Diplomat
- Awards: Legion of Honour; Order of Polonia Restituta

Barbara Lidia Labuda (née Ciesielska; born 1946) is a Polish politician, activist, diplomat and philologist. She was elected to the Contract Sejm, and was a member of the Sejm until 1996, when she became a minister in the Chancellery of President Aleksander Kwaśniewski. From 2005 to 2010, she was the Polish ambassador to Luxembourg.

== Life and work ==
In 1970, Labuda graduated from the Institute of Romance Philology at the University of Wrocław. From 1970 to 1973, Labuda studied the history of literature, political science and sociology at the University of Paris. She completed a doctorate in 1984.

From 1973 until 1981, Labuda was an activist with the Polish Socialist Youth Union, and was also involved with the Workers' Defence Committee and the Committee for Social Self-Defense KOR. In 1980, she also began to work with the Polish trade union Solidarity.

In 1989, Labuda became a researcher at the Institute of Romance Philology at the University of Wrocław. That year she was also elected to the Contract Sejm for the Solidarity Citizens' Committee. She was elected again in 1991 and 1993 representing the Polish Democratic Union, and in 1994 she became a member of the Polish Freedom Union. During this time she was the founder of the Parliamentary Group of Women.

In 1996, Labuda became an undersecretary in the Chancellery of the President of Polish president Aleksander Kwaśniewski, and in 1998 she became secretary of state. From 2005 to 2010, Labuda was the Polish ambassador to Luxembourg.

In 2019, Labuda headed the support committee for the Polish political party Spring. In 2020, Labuda was a member of the Consultative Council.

In 2004, Labuda was named a Chevalier of the Legion of Honour from the Government of France. In 2011, she was awarded the Officer's Cross of the Order of Polonia Restituta.

In 2005, Labuda published the book Poszukiwania (Searches).

== Awards ==
- Knight's Cross, Order of the Legion of Honour (2004)
- Officer's Cross, Order of Polonia Restituta (2011)
