= Bożena Przyłuska =

Polish secularist activist

- Occupation: Activist
- Website: przyluska.pl

Bożena Przyłuska is a Polish secularist activist who co-founded Secularity Congress (Polish: Kongres Świeckości). She became a founding member of the Consultative Council created on 1 November 2020 in the context of the October 2020 Polish protests.

== Secular activism ==
Przyłuska was motivated to participate in secularist activism after her children were forced to be present in classrooms during Catholic religious instruction classes, and, according to her, "were indoctrinated". She stated that most schools discriminated against children not attending Catholic instruction classes by placing the classes in the middle of the timetable. She became a coordinator of the Secular School (Polish: Świecka Szkoła) group that started in Warsaw and gathered 150,000 signatures in favour of a proposed law that passed through its first sitting in the Polish lower house of parliament, the Sejm.

Przyłuska is one of the co-founders, and as of June 2020, the vice-president of Secularity Congress (Polish: Kongres Świeckości).

Przyłuska described the 2016 Black Protest as breaking a taboo of citizens being afraid to criticise the Church on the issues of prenatal medical tests, contraception, in vitro fertilisation and sex education. She justified protests in front of churches as helping to break the taboo so that priests stopped feeling untouchable and above the law. Przyłuska was a spokesperson for All-Poland Women's Strike at May and October 2016 actions in front of the Sejm. In May, she stated that human rights activists had been attacked in the streets by "religious fanatics" spitting, pushing, using vulgar language, and preventing the collection of signatures.

In June 2020, Przyłuska was one of the co-authors of a law proposal Secular State. She described the aim as creating a law that forbids "church-administrative corruption". She stated that none of the Catholic Church in Poland structures, at any level of organisation, had to reveal their financial status. She referred to estimates of Church income ranging from 8 to 14,000,000,000zł per year. Przyłuska described the proposed law as aiming to require the Church to declare its income to the Polish Treasury, without detailed accounting to avoid violating the Concordat of 1993 with the Holy See; to forbid the state from giving land to the Church in return for electoral support; cancel a health insurance fund for the Church; and require taxation of certain uses of Church income.

== Consultative Council ==
Przyłuska was one of the founding members of the Consultative Council that was created on 1 November 2020 in the context of the October 2020 Polish protests.

== Personal life ==
In April 2020, Przyłuska publicly declared on Twitter that she had had an abortion. Within a day her post received 9000 likes and 1.6 million retweets. She complained about the domination of religious discussion over medical discussion in relation to abortion. Przyłuska stated that it was important for women's stories of their abortions to "have a face".
