= Dorota Łoboda =

Polish activist

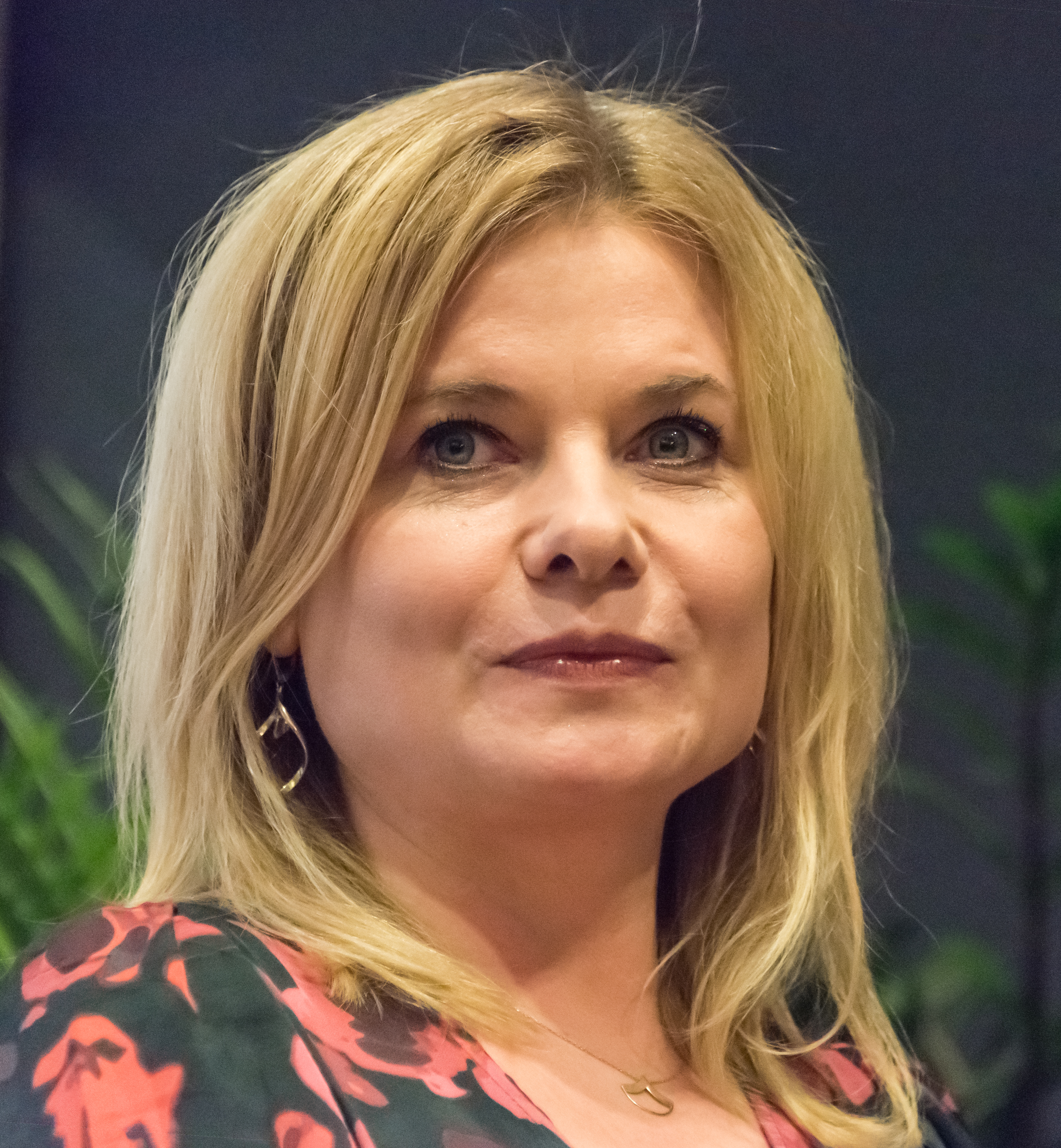
- Born: 19 August 1975
- Alma mater: University of Warsaw
- Known for: activism in Polish educational system, member of Polish Consultative Council

Dorota Łoboda (born 1975) is an educational rights activist in Poland. She was a leader of the Families Against Education Reform movement (Polish: Rodzice Przeciwko Reformie Edukacji) that opposed the reform of the Polish education system in 2016–2018 and a member of the Consultative Council created during the October 2020 Polish protests.

== Childhood and early career ==
Dorota Łoboda (born 1975) graduated from the University of Warsaw. Łoboda worked from 1997 to 2006 as a teacher in a private school and as an exhibition organiser at the Ujazdowski Castle Modern Art Centre.

== Activist and political career ==
=== 2016–2018 PiS education reforms ===
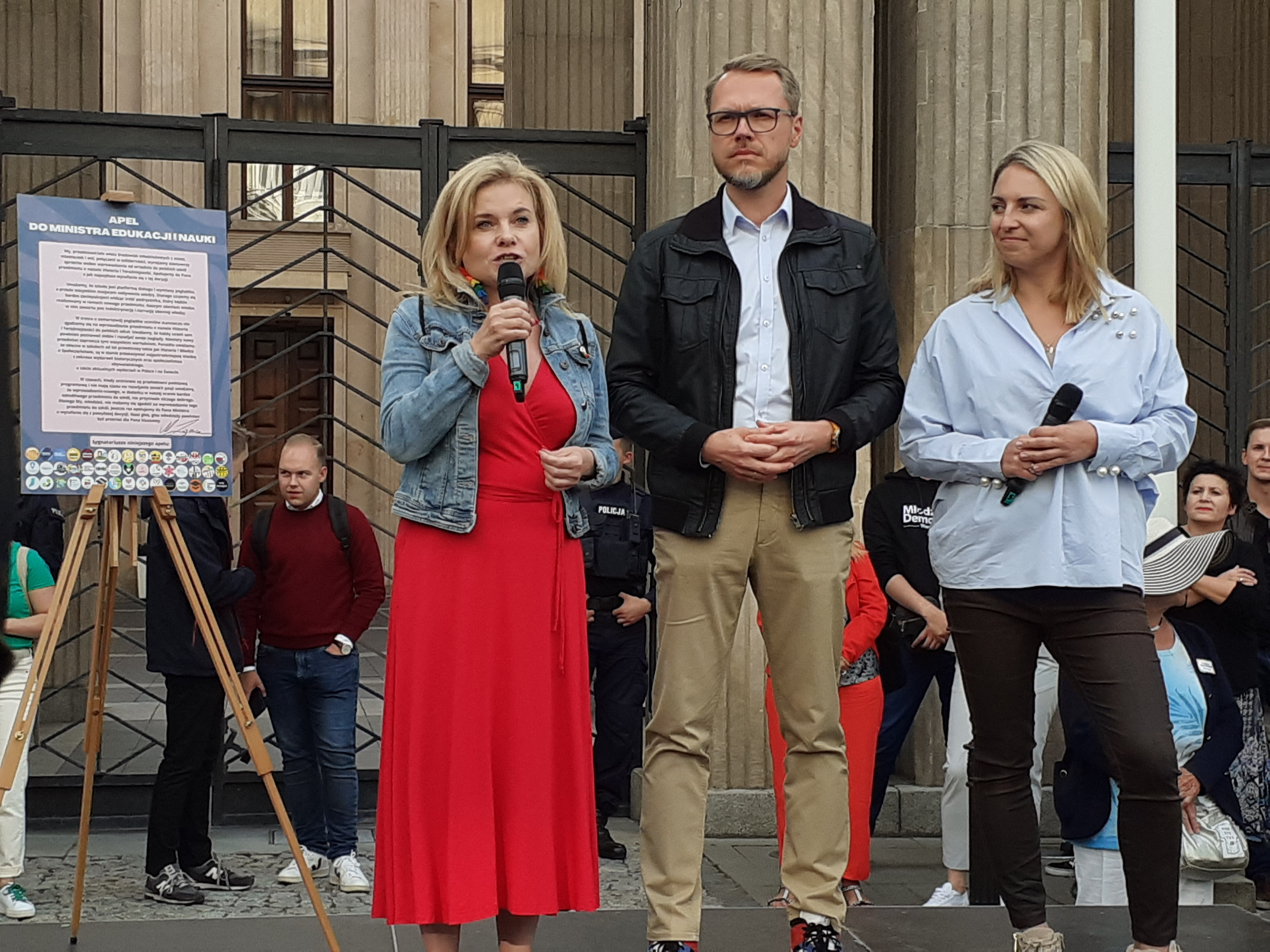
Dorota Loboda (left).

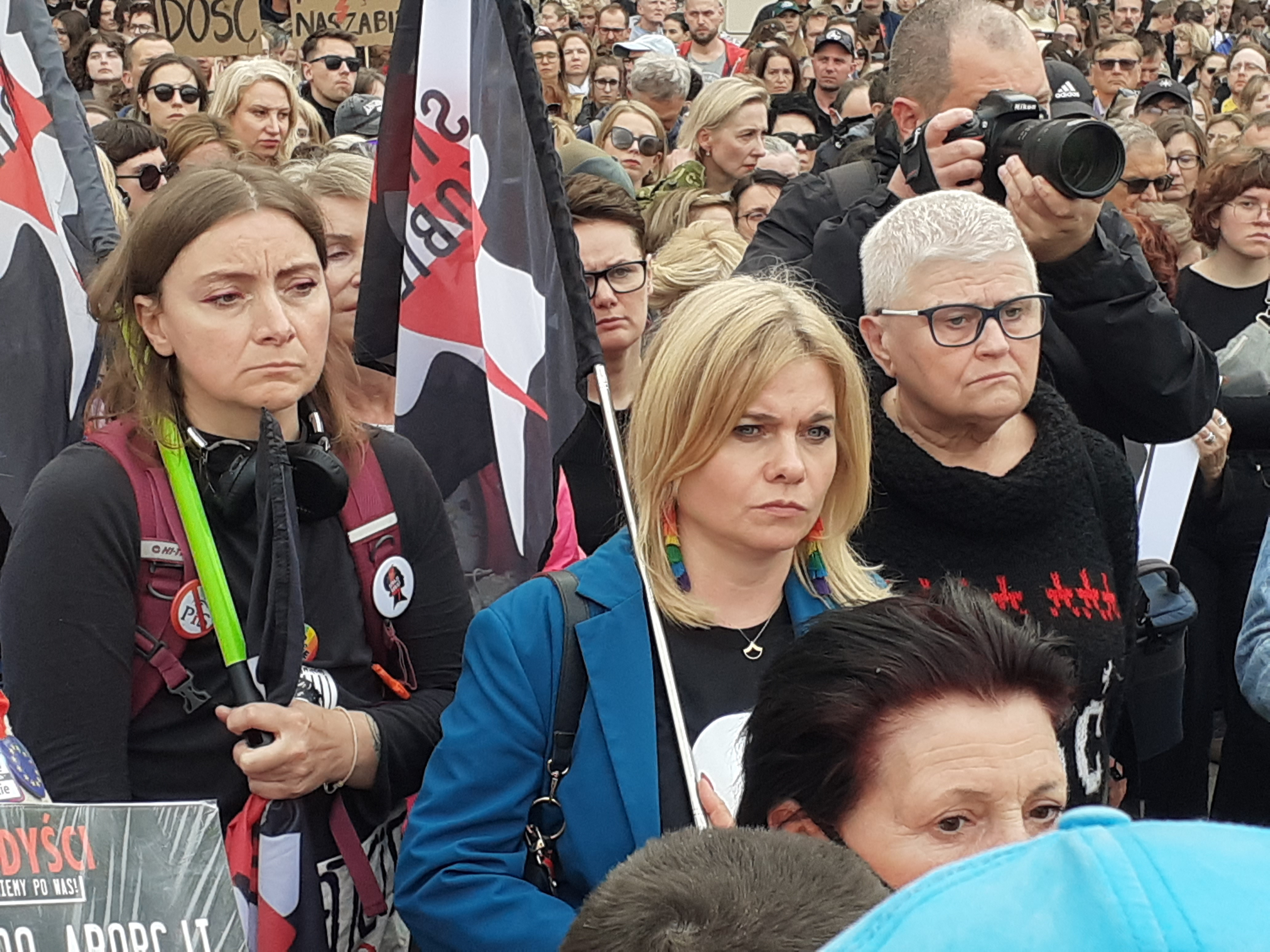
Dorota Łoboda during a demonstration in Warsaw.

The reform of the Polish education system in 2016–2018 under the Law and Justice (PiS) government of Poland shifted from a 6+3+3–year (primary plus junior-high plus senior-high) schooling system to an 8+4–year (primary plus high) school system. Łoboda was a leader of the Families Against Education Reform movement (Polish: Rodzice Przeciwko Reformie Edukacji) that opposed the PiS reforms.

In March 2017, Łoboda planned a protest in front of the Warsaw building of the Ministry of Education in which parents planned to bring tyres. The plan was "not to burn the tyres like miners do [in their protests]", while symbolising that the protestors had earlier "been polite" and that the scale of the protest was growing. Łoboda described the 10 March 2017 school strike, in which some schools had only ten percent attendance by pupils, as a sign of the strength of opposition to the reform plans.

Łoboda was the vice-president of a committee that collected signatures calling for a referendum on the proposed reform. The referendum petition collected 910,000 signatures. The referendum petition was rejected by PiS, which refused Łoboda a chance to present the referendum project to the Sejm, the Polish lower house of parliament.

On 7 June 2018, Łoboda became a member of the Board of the Foundation of Families Have a Voice (Polish: Fundacja Rodzice Mają Głos), based in Warsaw.

=== Warsaw Council 2018–2023 ===
Łoboda was elected as a member of the Warsaw City Council with a mandate for the years 2018–2023, in the Civic Coalition group.

=== 2020 Consultative Council ===
Łoboda was one of the founding members of the Consultative Council created on 1 November 2020 during the October 2020 Polish protests.
