= Karolina Micuła =

Polish singer, actress and activist

- Born: 16 November 1988 (age 37); Rzeszów, Poland
- Known for: singer, songwriter, artist, actress

Karolina Micuła (born 16 November 1988 in Rzeszów, Poland) is a Polish singer, songwriter, artist, actress and political activist.

In 2017, Micuła was the winner of the 38th Stage Songs Review Award in Wrocław for her performance of the song "Arahja" by Kult. She was awarded the WARTO award by the Gazeta Wyborcza newspaper for her art activism. As an actress, she has acted on stage at the Capitol Musical Theatre in Wrocław, as well as in several television shows.

She is one of the main coordinators of All-Poland Women's Strike, a women's rights social movement opposed to the ban on abortion in Poland, responsible for cultural issues in its Consultative Council.
