= Bartosz Staszewski =

Polish LGBT activist and film director (born 1990)

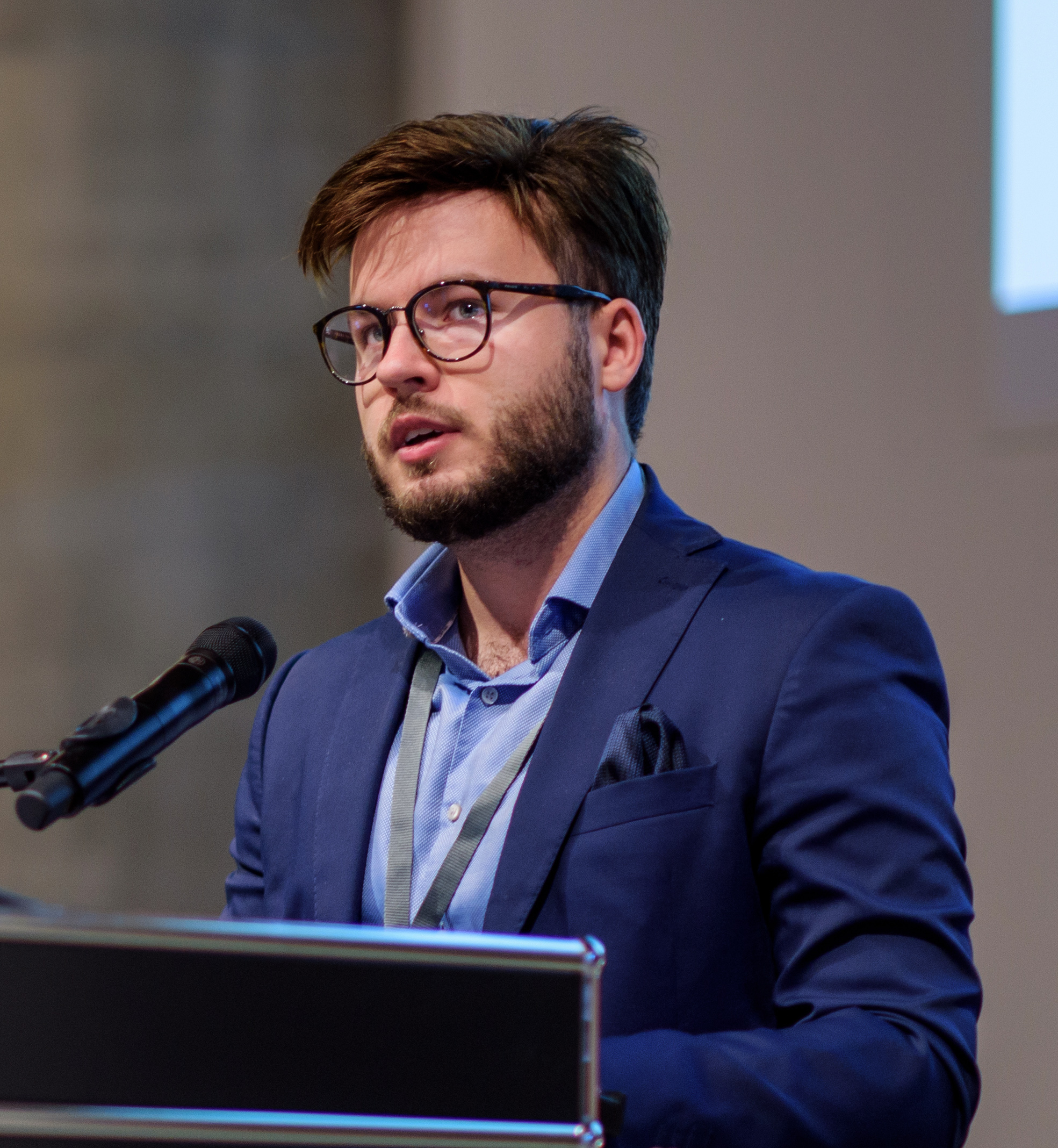
- Staszewski accepting the 2019 Tolerantia award in Switzerland
- Born: 23 September 1990 (age 35); Malmö, Sweden
- Occupations: filmmaker, social campaigner, LGBT rights activist
- Known for: Article Eighteen, Love Does Not Exclude Foundation
- Awards: European Tolerantia Award (2019)

Bartosz (Bart) Staszewski (born 23 September 1990) is a Polish filmmaker and LGBT activist. He is the creator of the documentary Article Eighteen, co-founder of the Equality March in Lublin association and the Miłość Nie Wyklucza foundation ('Love Does Not Exclude'), which promotes same-sex marriage in Poland. Staszewski was the target of death threats and intimidation in 2019 and 2021 in relation to his activism.

== Life ==
Staszewski was born in 1990 in Malmö, Sweden into a family of Polish immigrants. At the age of seven, he moved with his family back to Poland, Lublin, where he lived until he was 20. Then he moved to Warsaw.

== Lublin Pride ==
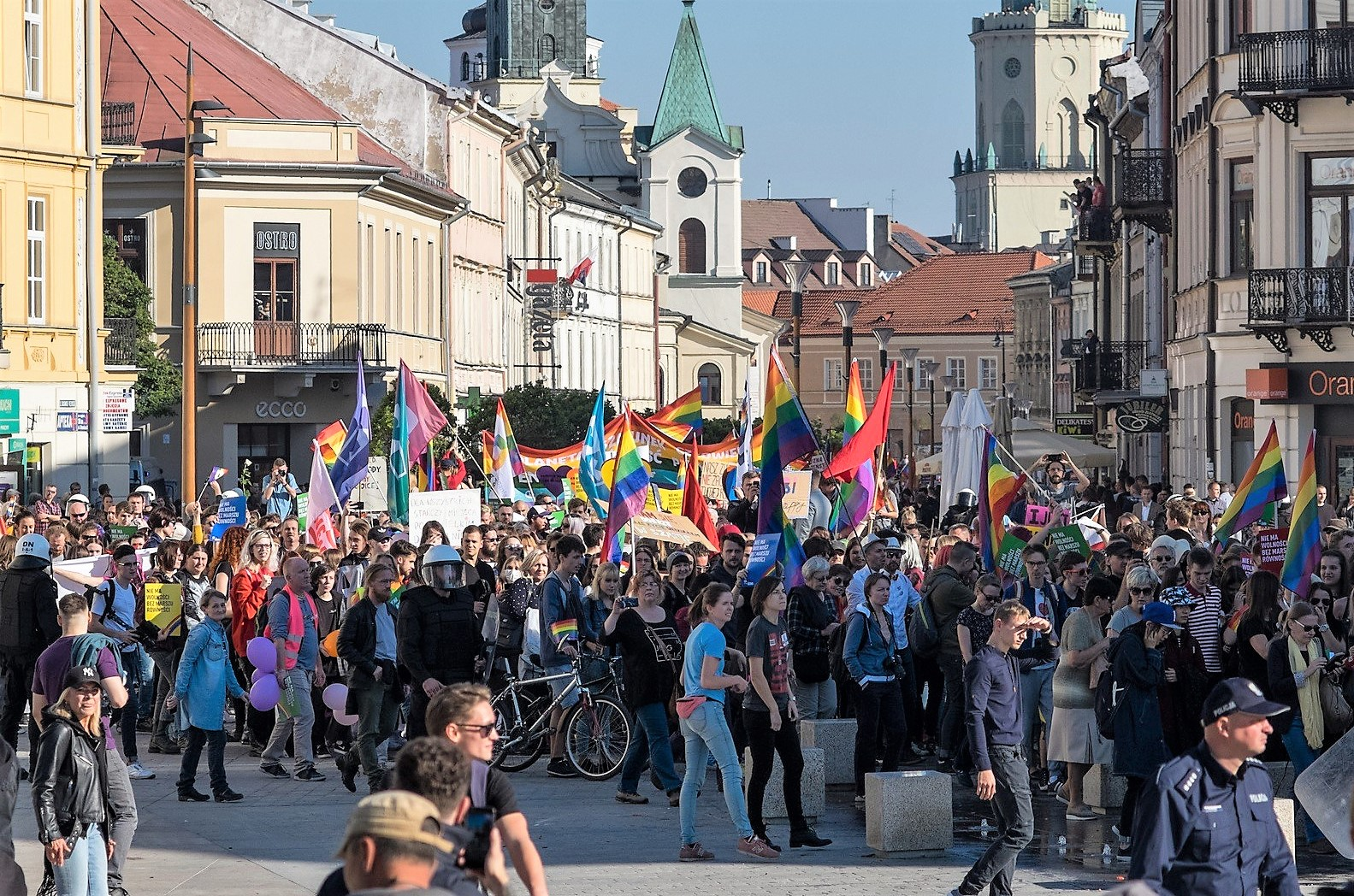
2018 Equality March in Lublin

In 2018 Staszewski was the formal organizer of the First Equality March in Lublin, scheduled for 13 October. On 9 October, the President of Lublin, Krzysztof Żuk, banned both the Equality March and the counter-meetings announced against it, citing a law that allows banning a public gathering due to the threat to life, health or property of people. Polish ombudsman Adam Bodnar criticized the decision, stating that it went against the Polish Constitution's guarantee of freedom of assembly. Previously the European Court of Human Rights held that bans on pride marches violate the European Convention of Human Rights after mayor Lech Kaczyński tried to ban the Equality Parade in Warsaw on the same grounds. Staszewski appealed against the prohibition decision to the district court, which upheld it. It was revoked the day before the March by the appellate court.

In April 2019, the Association for Equality March in Lublin (Stowarzyszenie Marsz Równości w Lublinie) was established, whose goal is to act for the benefit of LGBT communities in Lublin and the Lublin Province, including the organization of the equality march. Similarly to the situation in the previous year, on 24 September 2019, Krzysztof Żuk issued a ban of the Second Equality March in Lublin, planned for 28 September. Staszewski, as the organizer of the March, appealed against his decision to the court, which reversed the ban two days later. At the second Equality March a couple from Lublin tried to detonate homemade explosives. They were stopped by the police just in time. During trial an expert report revealed that detonating of such homemade explosives in a crowd could have led to fatalities. Following a plea with the prosecutor, the pair were sentenced to a year in prison - with the charges limited to the illegal manufacture and possession of explosive devices likely to bring danger to the life or health of many people.

== Rainbow flag of Poland ==
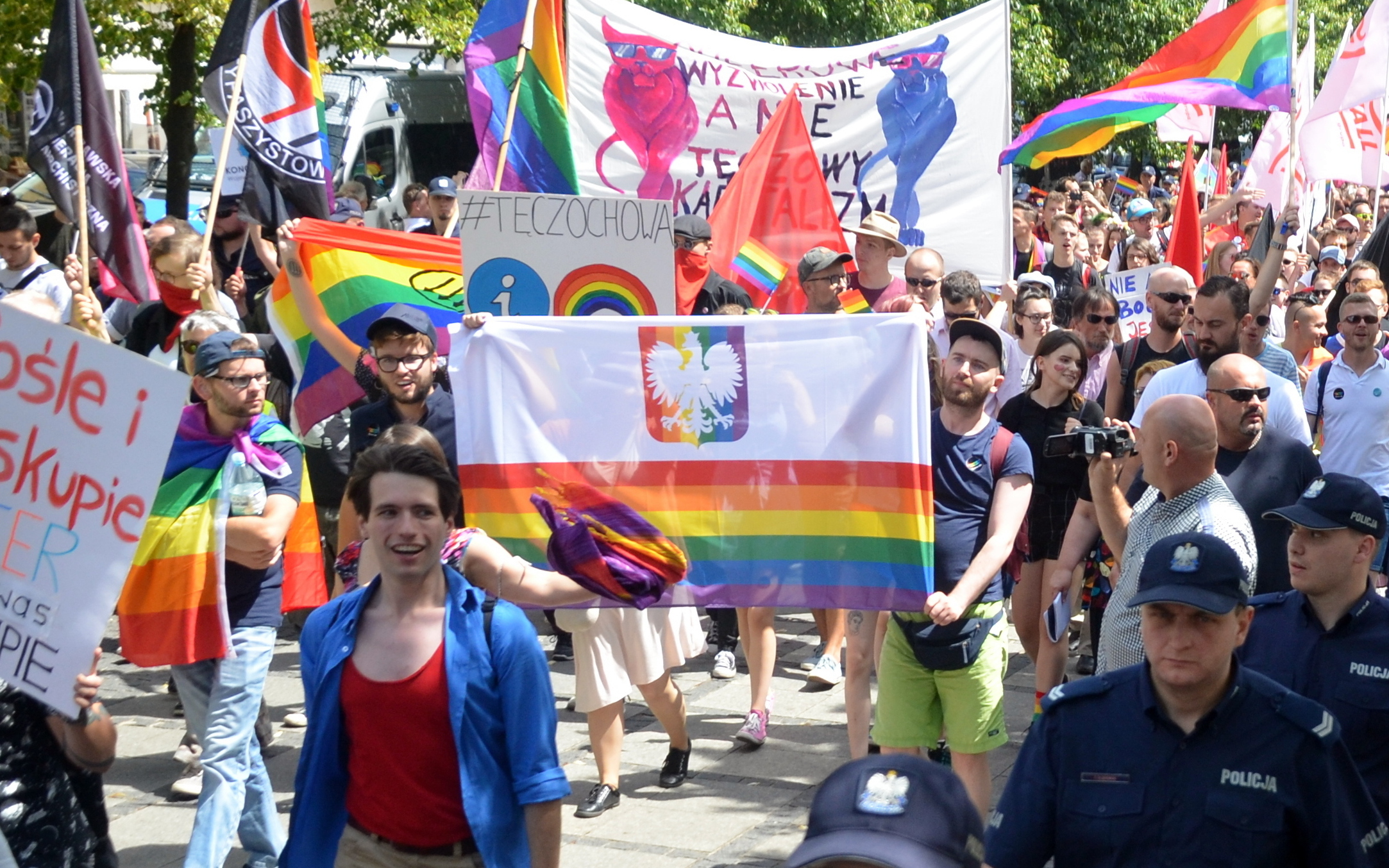
Rainbow flag of Poland at the 2018 Equality March in Częstochowa (Staszewski on the left)

Rainbow Flag of Poland by Angela Getler

During the March in Częstochowa in 2018, Bartosz Staszewski carried the Rainbow Flag of Poland with a white eagle on a rainbow background. Despite it being present at Polish Pride Parades and Marches since 2014, this time, according to conservative and right-wing circles, such a display constituted an insult to the state symbols, and the Minister of Internal Affairs and Administration at the time, Joachim Brudziński accused Staszewski of desecrating the national symbols of Poland.

Brudziński's actions triggered protests of the LGBT community under the slogan Rainbow does not offend (Tęcza nie obraża), the prosecutor's office refused to initiate an investigation due to the lack of signs of a criminal act. This case popularized this version of the flag among the LGBT community.

== Defamation ==
In 2018, Law and Justice councillor Tomasz Pitucha claimed that the Lublin equality march promotes pedophilia. Staszewski, as the organizer of the march, brought an action against Pitucha for defamation. The latter was convicted and had to pay PLN 5,000 to the Lublin equality march association.

== LGBT-free zones ==
On 24 July 2019, the conservative weekly newspaper Gazeta Polska started to distribute 'LGBT-free zone' stickers. In response to this action, Staszewski filed a lawsuit for the violation of personal rights against the newspaper together with a motion to withdraw the stickers. The Regional Court in Warsaw ordered that the distribution of stickers be suspended until the case is considered by the court.

In response to discriminatory resolutions of local governments, which have declared themselves zones free of the 'LGBT ideology', Staszewski carried out a photographic project in which he takes pictures of signs marking the entrance to the village with the 'LGBT Free Zone' sign, which refers to real road signs. In some of the photos, he additionally portrays LGBT people who live in the 'zone'.

Staszewski became a target of SLAPP lawsuits because of his photo-project. So far three cities prepared civil lawsuits against him (Zakrzówek, Tuszów Narodowy and Niebylec). The cities are represented by nationalistic NGO Polish League Against Defamation. According to Haaretz it is an "independent organization considered close to Poland's right-wing, nationalist government".

== August 2020 LGBT protests in Poland ==
On 7 August 2020, Staszewski was one of the people protesting during "August 2020 LGBT protests in Poland" mass arrest, which he called "a turning point for the entire Poland".

== Awards ==
Staszewski was nominated for various awards. In 2019, he was awarded the European Tolerantia Award. In September 2020, he was chosen by the Obama Foundation to participate in the Leaders: Europe 2020 program as one of 35 "emerging leaders working in government, civil society, and the private sector who have demonstrated a commitment to advancing the common good". Staszewski was also among Bloomberg Businessweek "Ones to Watch" 2020 List associated with the Bloomberg 50. In February 2021, he appeared on the Time 100 Next 2021 list of emerging leaders shaping the future by the American news magazine Time.

== Filmography ==
- 2014: Tableciarze (documentary, screened at Krakow Film Festival, Baghdad Film Festival, Igława Film Festival)
- 2017: Artykuł osiemnasty (English: Article 18 - documentary)

Article 18 is a 2017 documentary film which had its premiere on 21 April 2017 during the LGBT Film Festival in Warsaw and was later screened in other cities as part of the festival. The title of the film refers to Article 18 of the Constitution of the Republic of Poland, which states that the Polish state protects marriage, defined as a union between a woman and a man, as well as family, motherhood and parenthood.

== Personal life ==
Staszewski's partner is Sławomir Wodzyński, a fellow member of Miłość Nie Wyklucza. The couple were the two main producers of Artykuł 18.

== See also ==
- LGBT rights in Poland
