= Rainbow Night =

2020 mass arrest of LGBT rights protesters in Poland

- Part of the Polish LGBTQ rights movement
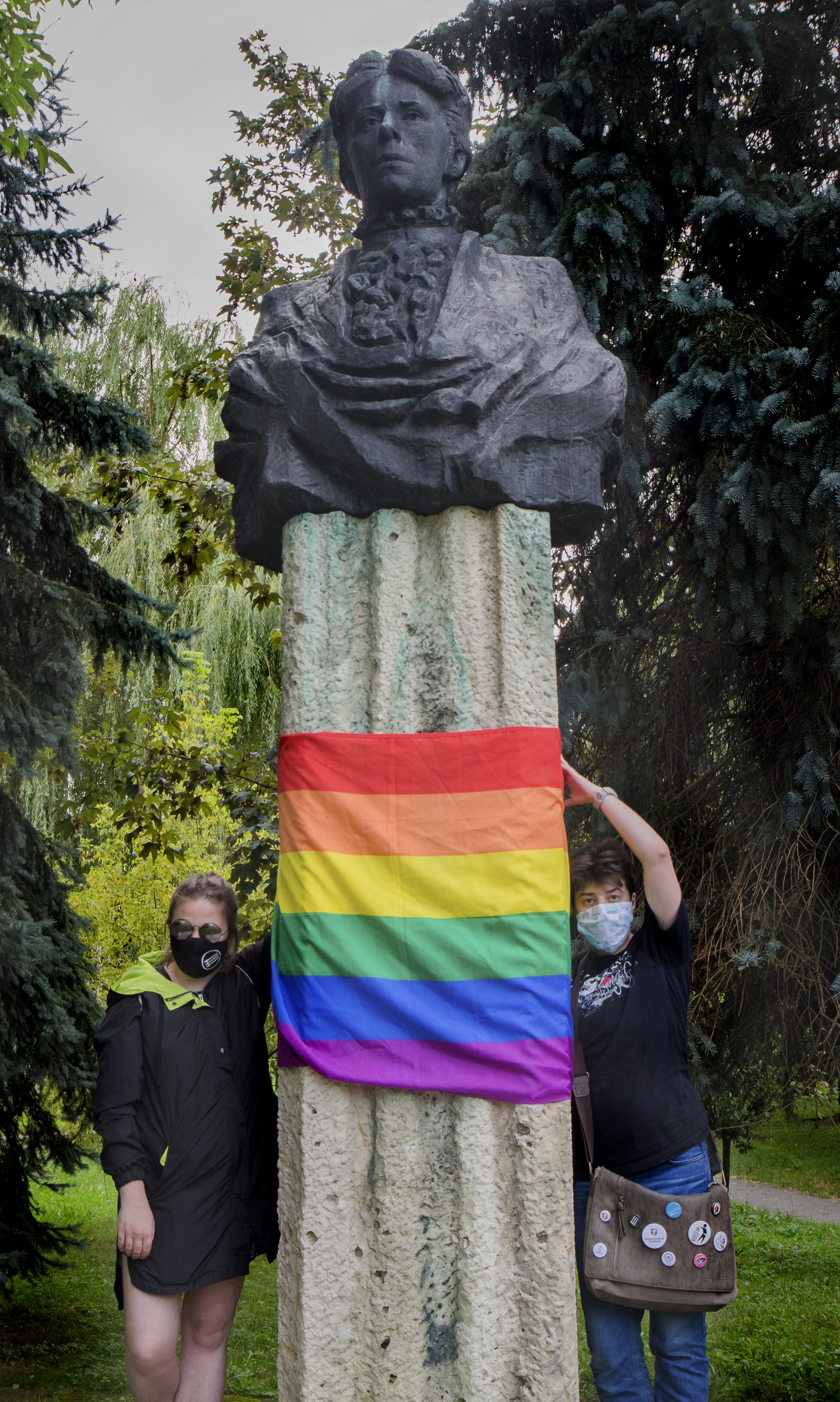
- LGBTQ activists hang the rainbow flag on the Maria Konopnicka monument in Kraków in August 2020
- Date: 7 August 2020
- Location: Poland
- Caused by: Rising anti-LGBTQ rhetoric and the declaration of LGBT-free zones
- Methods: Demonstrations, direct action, civil disobedience
- Result: Mass arrests of LGBTQ rights protestors

Parties
LGBT rights movement: Stop Bullshit; Campaign Against Homophobia; Opposition: Progressives; Civic Coalition; The Left	Government: United Right; Policja; Traditionalists: All-Polish Youth; Confederation

Lead figures
Małgorzata Szutowicz; Bartosz Staszewski Agnieszka Dziemianowicz-Bąk	Andrzej Duda; Mateusz Morawiecki; Zbigniew Ziobro; Mariusz Kamiński; Jarosław Szymczyk Ziemowit Przebitkowski; Krzysztof Bosak; Kaja Godek

Casualties
- Arrested: More than 48 detained

Rainbow Night (Polish: Tęczowa Noc) occurred on 7 August 2020, when a protest against the arrest of LGBTQ activist Małgorzata "Margot" Szutowicz led to a confrontation with police in central Warsaw, Poland, which resulted in the arrest of 47 others, some of whom were protesting, and others who were bystanders. The incident was dubbed "Polish Stonewall" by some outlets, in an analogy to the 1969 Stonewall riots.

Declarations of LGBT-free zones in 2019 and 2020 and the 2020 Polish presidential election – which saw President Andrzej Duda repeatedly stress his opposition to LGBT rights – led to protests from LGBT rights activists, who adopted direct action tactics. On 7 August, a court granted a request for Margot's pre-trial detention for two months. She presented herself for arrest while hundreds of sympathizers protested the arrest. The police initially declined to arrest her, but later tried to do so and were physically, but non-violently blocked by activists. The police then arrested 48 people: Margot, protestors, and others who had not taken part in the demonstration.

The action of the police on 7 August was criticised by the Polish Ombudsman, Helsinki Foundation for Human Rights, the Council of Europe human rights commissioner and dozens of celebrities, including Margaret Atwood. Critics have described the number of arrests as excessive, and protested against police brutality. Solidarity protests have occurred in several cities in Poland, Germany, and the United Kingdom. On 16 August, a right-wing demonstration was held in Warsaw opposing "LGBT aggression".

== Background ==
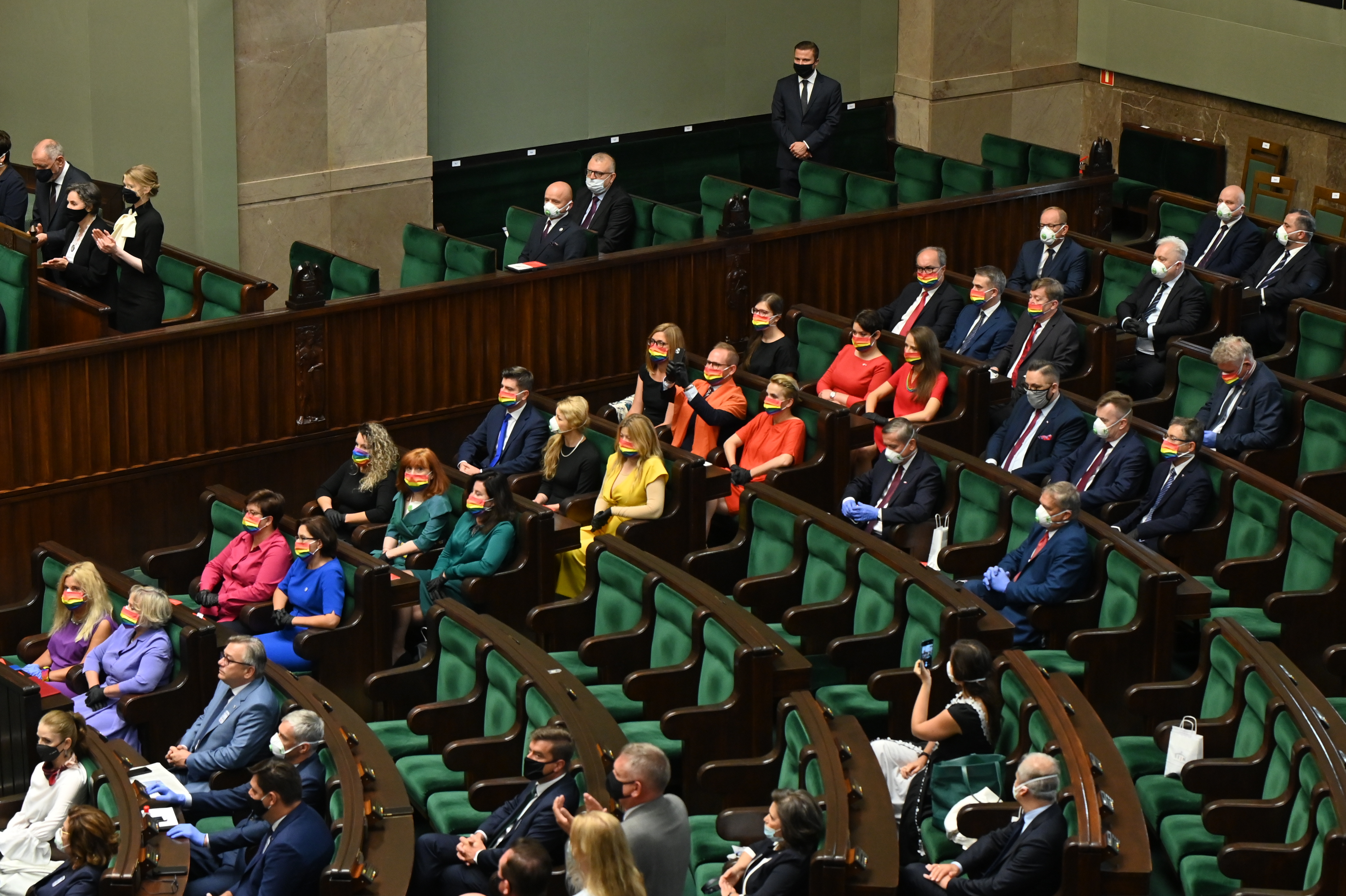
Some opposition members of the Sejm formed a rainbow to protest the 2020 inauguration of President Andrzej Duda.

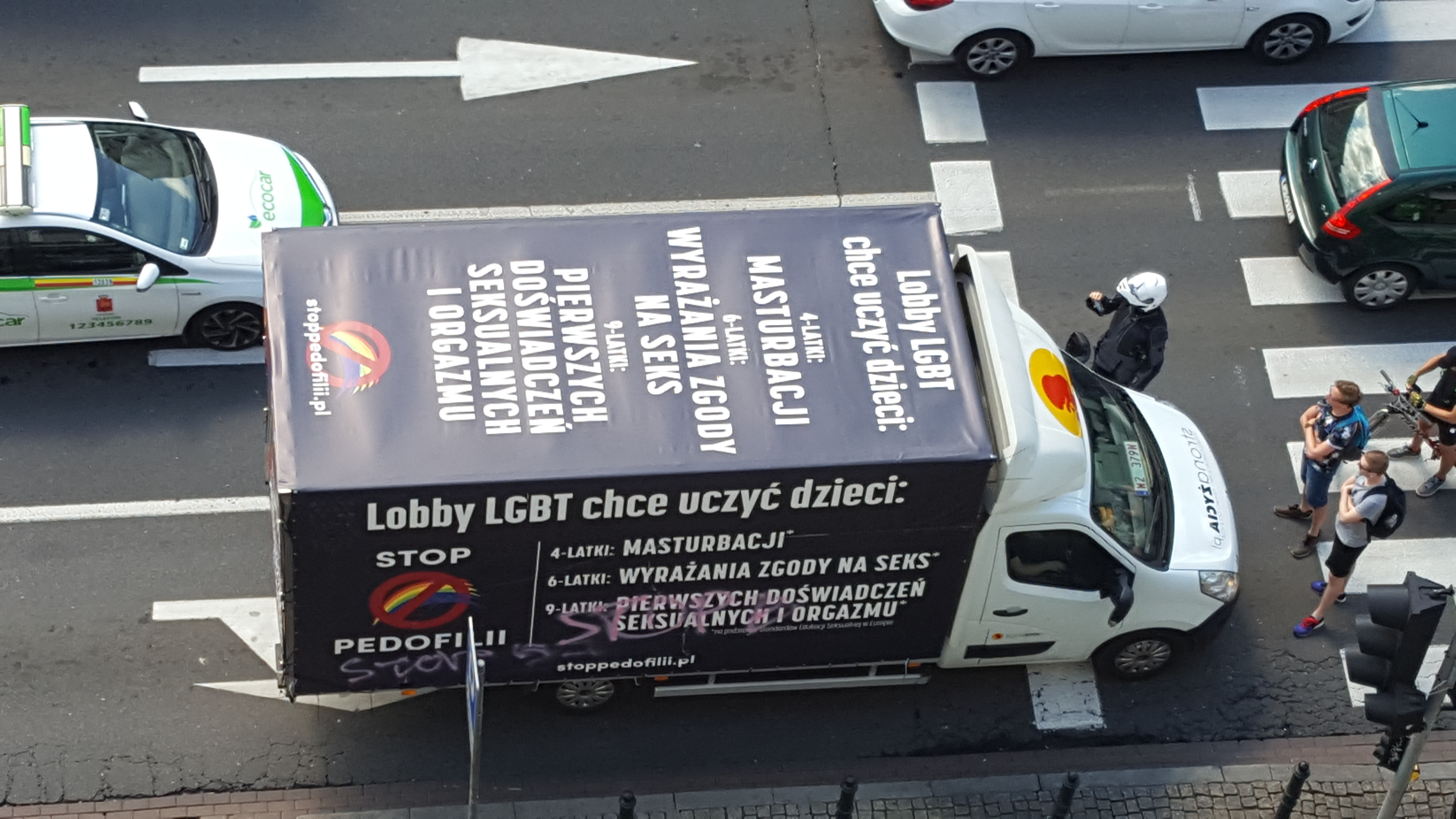
"Stop Pedofilii" van belonging to Fundacja Pro, linking homosexuality with pedophilia

According to a 2019 survey, 24% of Poles believe that the LGBTQ movement is the greatest threat facing their country. Between 2019 and 2020, nearly 100 Polish municipalities and regions declared themselves "LGBT-free zones". The ruling Law and Justice party ran an anti-LGBTQ campaign during the 2020 Polish presidential election. President Andrzej Duda emphasized the issue, stating, "LGBT is not people, it's an ideology", calling it an "ideology of evil" that is "even more dangerous to mankind than communism". Duda narrowly won the election, by the thinnest margin since the end of the Soviet Union. According to ILGA-Europe's 2020 report, Poland is ranked worst among European Union countries for LGBTQ rights.

Some LGBTQ activists, including the collective "Stop Bzdurom" ("Stop Bullshit"), have adopted illegal direct action tactics due to frustration with what they see as increasing, state-sponsored attacks against them. One target is the vans belonging to Fundacja Pro, which are covered in anti-LGBT slogans associating homosexuality and pedophilia, a message which the vans also broadcast on loudspeakers. The drivers know where the Stop Bzdurom activists live and target their place of residence. LGBT organizations such as Campaign Against Homophobia and Tolerado have attempted to stop the vans by reporting them to the police; however, these efforts have been mostly unsuccessful due to the lack of recognition of anti-LGBT speech in Poland's hate speech laws. Stop Bzdurom activists took a different approach, spray-painting the vans and breaking off their license plates. Łania Madej, a member of the group, stated, "We do it only for the queer kids who run with us and they have a little bit of fun and feel brave for 10 minutes." Małgorzata Szutowicz, better known as Margot, is another member of Stop Bzdurom and Madej's partner. She is accused of damaging a Fundacja Pro van in late June and assaulting the driver, for which she was arrested, charged, and released after the first judge to hear the case refused the prosecution's request for pre-trial detention. Not all LGBTQ people in Poland agree with Stop Bzdurom's tactics.

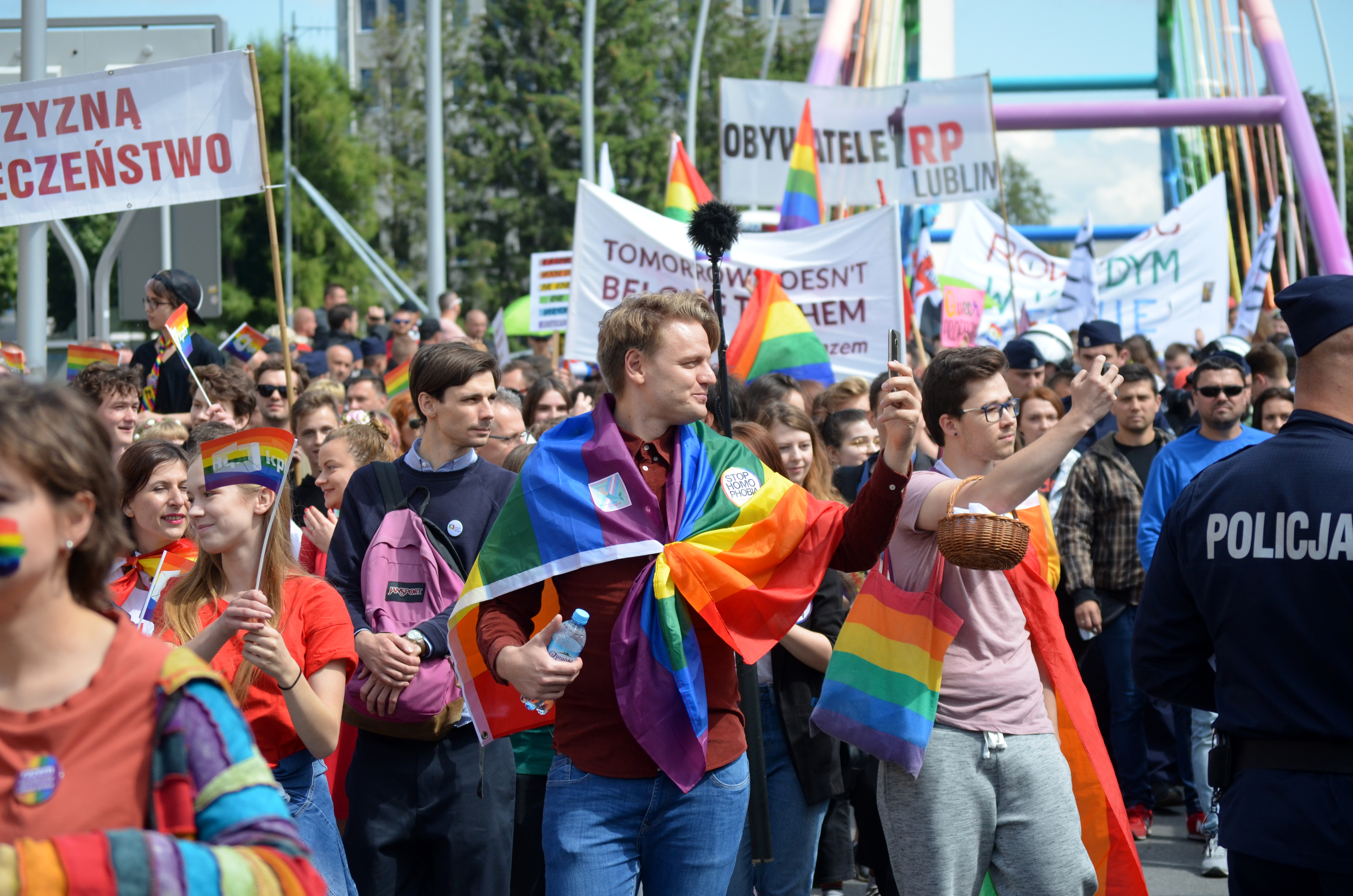
Campaign Against Homophobia at the 2018 equality march in Rzeszów

In late July, Stop Bzdurom placed rainbow flags and anarchist bandanas on statues of Nicolaus Copernicus, Józef Piłsudski, the Mermaid of Warsaw, and Jesus in Warsaw. The activists released a manifesto, stating, "As long as the rainbow scandalizes anybody and is treated as inappropriate we solemnly pledge to provoke". The action shocked some Polish Catholics, including Law and Justice Prime Minister Mateusz Morawiecki, who called the actions "desecration" and posted photographs of himself praying in front of the Jesus statue. Stop Bzdurom later relocated the candle he left behind, placing it where a transgender person had killed themselves by jumping off a bridge. Former prime minister Donald Tusk tweeted, "Jesus has always been on the side of the weaker and the harmed, never on the side of the oppressive governments". On 5 August, Margot, Madej, and another activist involved in the flag drapings were arrested for "insulting religious feelings and disrespecting Warsaw monuments", charged, and released after about 40 hours. Warsaw's mayor, Rafał Trzaskowski, stated that he disapproved of the flag draping but criticized the arrests for violating the rule of law.

== 7 August mass arrest ==
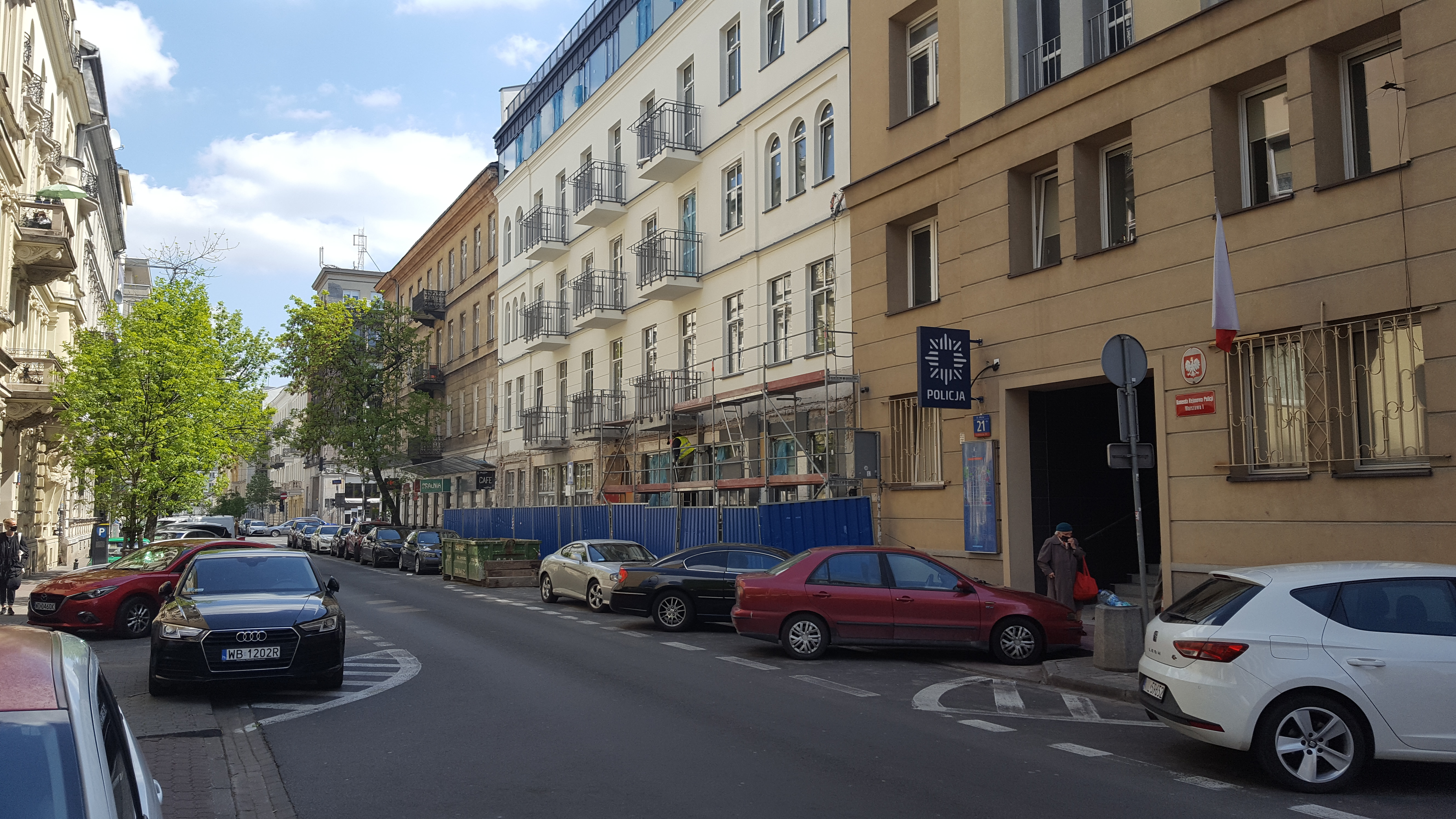
Wilcza street, Warsaw, police station where arrested activists were held

On 7 August 2020, a second judge granted an arrest warrant against Małgorzata "Margot" Szutowicz which provided for two months pre-trial detention, which was considered excessive and politically motivated by some LGBTQ rights supporters. Margot was waiting at Campaign Against Homophobia's office in Warsaw to be arrested, but the police initially said that she would not be arrested. Hundreds of protestors had showed up, including left-wing MP Agnieszka Dziemianowicz-Bąk, and the protest moved to another location in central Warsaw, around Krakowskie Przedmieście and Wilcza streets, before another group of plainclothes police tried to arrest Margot. Some protestors used civil disobedience to prevent this. Two people sat on the hood of the police car while others blocked the path of the vehicle. In total, forty-eight people, including Margot, were arrested, which was described as a "mass arrest", and held in at least four police stations in Warsaw. Among those arrested were LGBTQ activist Bartosz Staszewski, a 52-year-old amateur journalist, Malgorzata Rawinska, who had been reporting on the protest, and an Italian legal resident who happened on the demonstration and was arrested while watching it.

The Polish Ombudsman reported that "among the arrested, there are people who did not take active part in the gatherings on Krakowskie Przedmieście or Wilcza street, but were watching the incident. Some of them had rainbow emblems – bags, pins, flags. Among the detained there were also arbitrary people who in a certain moment were, for example, coming out of a shop with bags." Campaign Against Homophobia reported that "The police were aggressively pushing the protesters out of the way, knocking people to the ground and holding them down with their boots". Those arrested were initially not given the reason for their arrest, but later told that they might face charges for "taking part in an illegal gathering during the COVID-19 pandemic". According to lawyer Emilia Barabasz, who is working pro bono for some of those arrested, most of the detainees were charged under Article 254 of the Criminal Code "active participation in an illegal gathering" and some were also charged with Article 57a, "hooligan misconduct". Some of those arrested reported being beaten by police and suffering injuries, questioned without a lawyer present, or denied medical treatment and water. Some were strip-searched despite no indication that they possessed drugs or any dangerous item, and transgender arrestees were misgendered.

To justify their actions, police later released a video of the mass arrest called "Through the eyes of the police", which did not show any violence on the part of the protesters. According to Balkan Insight, "testimonies from the detained and their lawyers, as well as independent observers, point to a disproportionate response by the police, who arrested peaceful protesters and even random passers-by while acting violently". All except Margot were released later that weekend after spending the night in jail. Later, police visited the addresses of the arrestees, which a spokesperson for Helsinki Foundation for Human Rights said was unusual and unwarranted except for serious crime, and could be considered a form of police harassment. Margot was taken to Płock where she was held in solitary confinement and released on 28 August following an appeal by her lawyer.

== Solidarity demonstrations ==
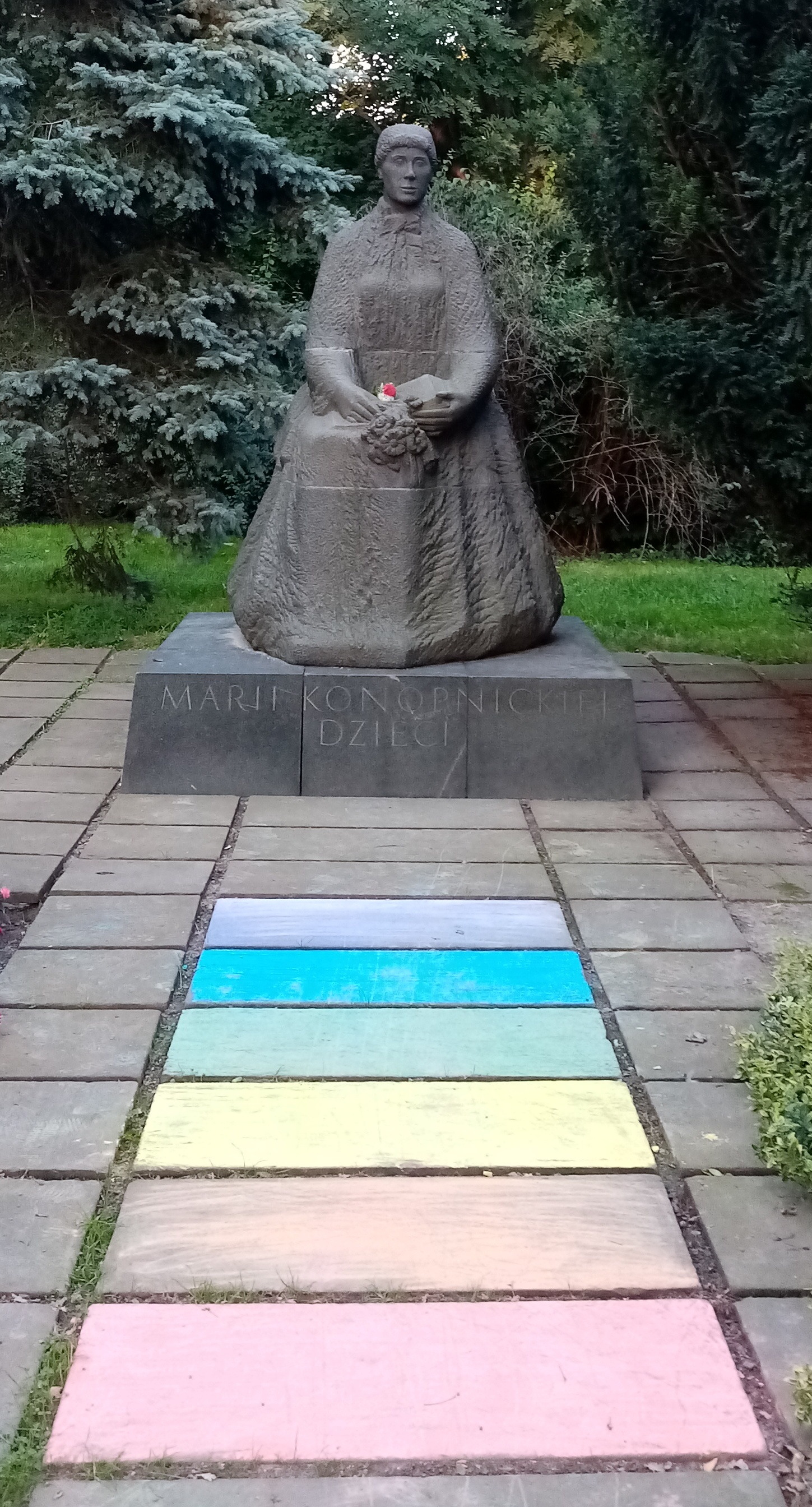
Statue of Polish poet Maria Konopnicka, decorated with a rainbow on 14 August 2020

After word got out of the arrests, sympathizers gathered outside the police stations to protest, and multiple parliamentarians, including Magdalena Filiks and Klaudia Jachira of Civic Coalition, visited the police stations to ensure that detainees' human rights were respected. Pro-bono legal help was offered to many of those arrested. Some of the people outside Wilcza Street police station were also arrested. The next day, thousands of mostly young people gathered in Warsaw to protest the arrests, using slogans such as "You will not lock all of us up!" and "She will never walk alone!" Activists pinned a rainbow flag to the Copernicus monument and criticized Trzaskowski for not attending the demonstration. Several MPs were in attendance: Joanna Scheuring-Wielgus, Beata Maciejewska, Małgorzata Prokop-Paczkowska, Agnieszka Dziemianowicz-Bąk, Anna Maria Żukowska, Katarzyna Ueberhan, Magdalena Biejat, Krzysztof Śmiszek, and Maciej Gdula (all from The Left) and Barbara Nowacka, Urszula Zielińska, and Monika Rosa from Civic Coalition. The writers Szczepan Twardoch and Łukasz Orbitowski also participated in the demonstration.

Over the weekend, solidarity demonstrations were also held in Kraków (300 people attended), Lublin, Wrocław, Rzeszów, Białowieża, Bydgoszcz, Gdańsk, Łódź, Poznań, Tarnów, and Zielona Góra. The demonstration in Częstochowa on 10 August attracted around 150 participants, including Democratic Left Alliance MP Zdzisław Wolski. On 17 August, there was a solidarity demonstration in Plac Stulecia, Sosnowiec, attended by about 20 people including Modern MP Monika Rosa and local politician Janusz Kubicki. Police had to protect them from a larger group of counter-demonstrators who threatened and insulted the participants in the soldiarity demonstration; one of them was later criminally charged for making threats.

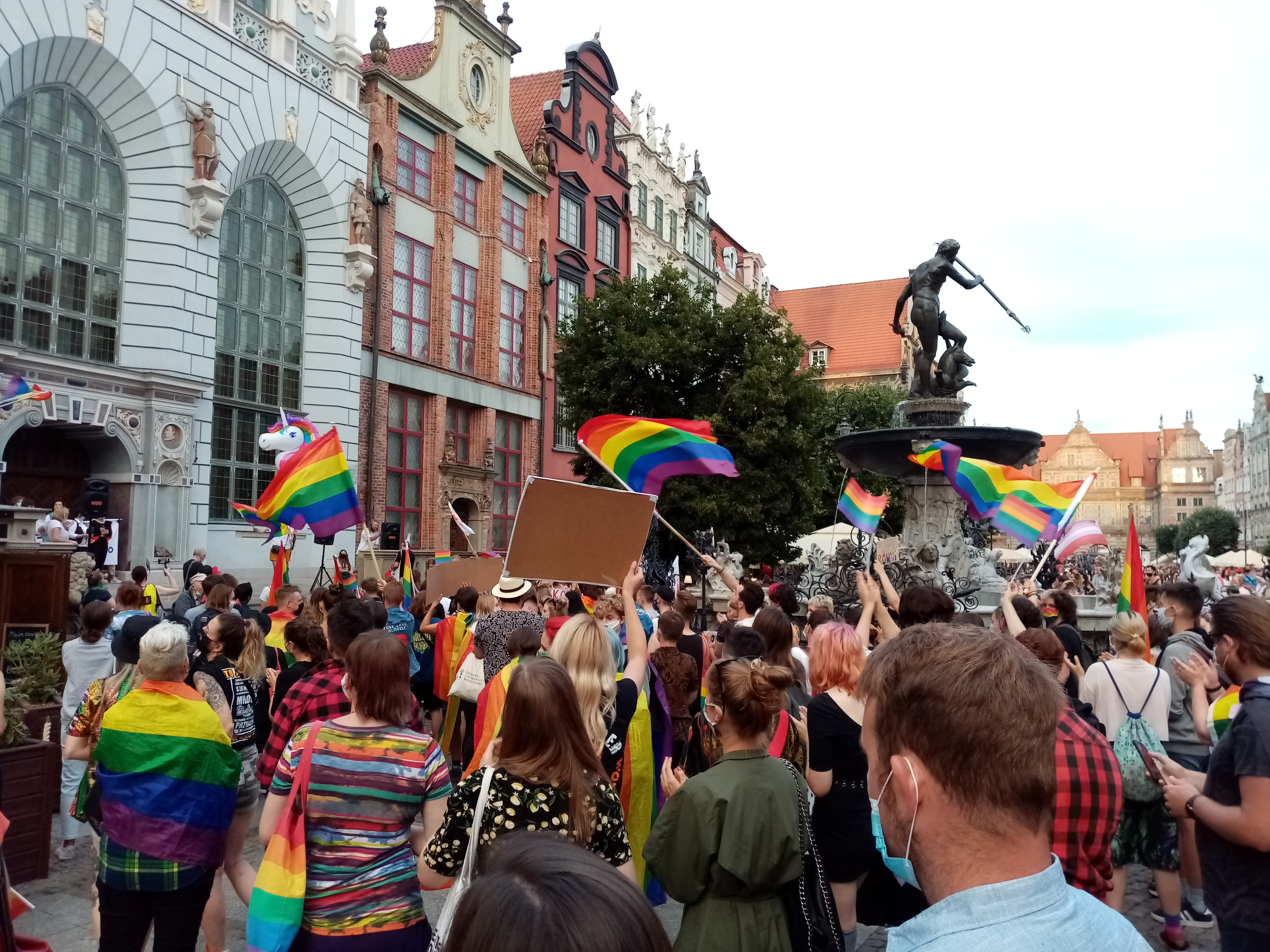
Pro-LGBT protest in Gdańsk, 20 August

During the next week, solidarity demonstrations were held outside the Polish Institute in Berlin and in front of the Polish embassy in Budapest. A 13 August march in Leipzig was attended by 300 people, and Rainbow Slovakia activists hung a rainbow flag on the statue of Pope John Paul II in Bratislava. Soldiarity protests occurred on 10 August and 13 August outside the Polish consulate in Edinburgh. On 15 August, a protest reportedly attended by 100 people was held outside the Polish embassy in London, as well as demonstrations in Manchester and Newcastle the same day, and in Bristol on 18 August. The protests in the United Kingdom were organized by members of the Polish diaspora.

The week after the mass arrest, in Szczecin an activist was cited for carrying a sign stating "Jesus would walk with us", which was alleged to fall under the crime of "offending religious feelings". Six people in Kraków were cited for hanging a rainbow flag over a statue of the Wawel Dragon; possible charges suggested by the police included "putting an object in the wrong place" and "disturbing public order". Undeterred, activists continue to block vans and drape rainbow flags despite others facing criminal charges for these actions. Rainbow flags have been hung on buildings, including the former SS headquarters in Warsaw, Faculty of Psychology of the University of Warsaw, and Polish Theatre in Poznań.

== "Stop LGBT aggression" counter-demonstrations ==
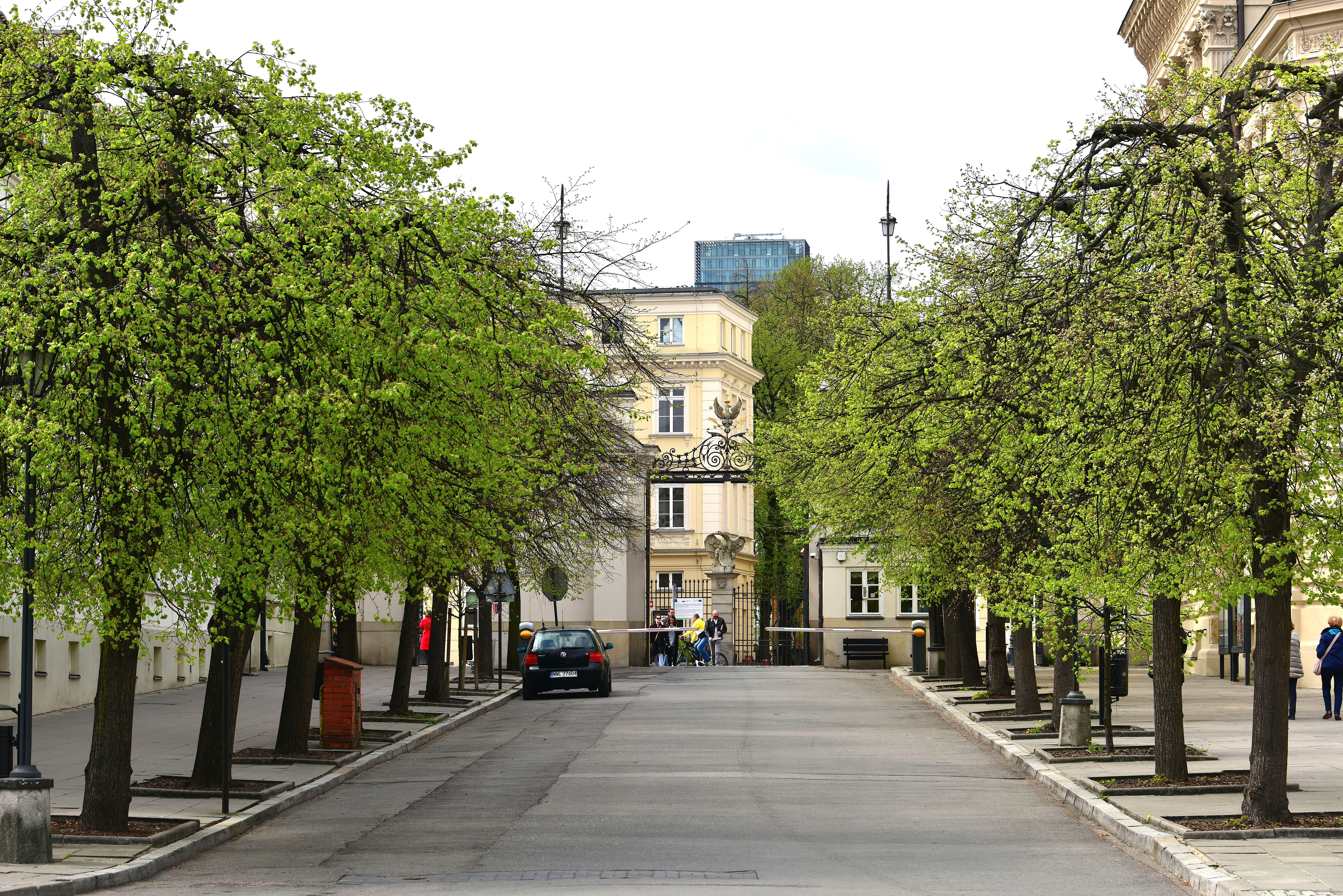
Main gate of the University of Warsaw, 2019

On Sunday 16 August, nationalist demonstrators held a demonstration in Krakowskie Przedmieście, near the main gate of the University of Warsaw, called "Stop LGBT aggression" ("Przeciw agresji LGBT" or "Stop agresji LGBT"). Demonstrators burned a rainbow flag—which counter-demonstrators stated was stolen from them—and shouted, "Away with deviation" and "How's Margot?" On the nationalist side, All-Polish Youth leader Ziemowit Przebitkowski, MP Krzysztof Bosak (Confederation) and anti-abortion activist Kaja Godek gave speeches. A counter-demonstration was attended by The Greens MPs Marek Kossakowski and Małgorzata Tracz, as well as Civic Coalition's MP Franciszek Sterczewski and The Left MP Agnieszka Dziemianowicz-Bąk. A heavy police presence kept both groups strictly separated from each other. Prior to the demonstration, someone had painted a rainbow on the street, which police said was an unknown substance that posed a threat to vehicle traffic.

== Reactions ==
The Polish Ombudsman, Adam Bodnar, stated that he was deeply concerned by the police response. His office had interviewed 33 of those arrested on 7 August 2020, and launched an investigation. Bodnar added that he thought it was unnecessary to arrest so many people and that the excessive police actions "constituted abuse of human rights". Bodnar said that the authorities' response to a demonstration depended on whether it was "liked by the authorities or not": right-wing demonstrations have not attracted a police response. Dunja Mijatović, human rights commissioner for the Council of Europe, called for Margot's immediate release, tweeting "Order to detain her for 2 months sends very chilling signal for #FreedomOfSpeech & #LGBT rights in #Poland". On TOK FM radio station, lawyer Michal Wawrykiewicz stated: "The way the police behaved is incompatible with Polish law. The names and ranks of the officers were missing on the uniforms. And finally, access to legal counsel was made difficult for the arrested." Former police commandant of Zgierz district, Iwona Lewandowska, stated that the response "ruined the image of the police". Trzaskowski stated that the response to the protest was "grossly disproportionate". However, Minister of Justice Zbigniew Ziobro, of United Poland party, defended the police response and said "defense of banditry by politicians is unheard of".

On 8 August, Helsinki Foundation for Human Rights released a statement criticizing excessive arrests and police brutality in connection with the previous day's mass arrest, which was signed by dozens of other Polish civil society groups. Police actions were criticized in a letter signed by dozens of former Solidarity activists, who compared it to the state persecution of anti-Communists in the Polish People's Republic. On 20 August, OKO.press published a letter from a number of prominent religious figures, including Michael Schudrich, the Chief Rabbi of Poland, stating that they disagreed with the pre-trial detention of Margot. The same day, French MEP Pierre Karleskind stated that he had recruited 64 MEPs to refer the matter of the 7 August mass arrest to the European Commission because "The European Union cannot stand idly by in the face of this new provocation."

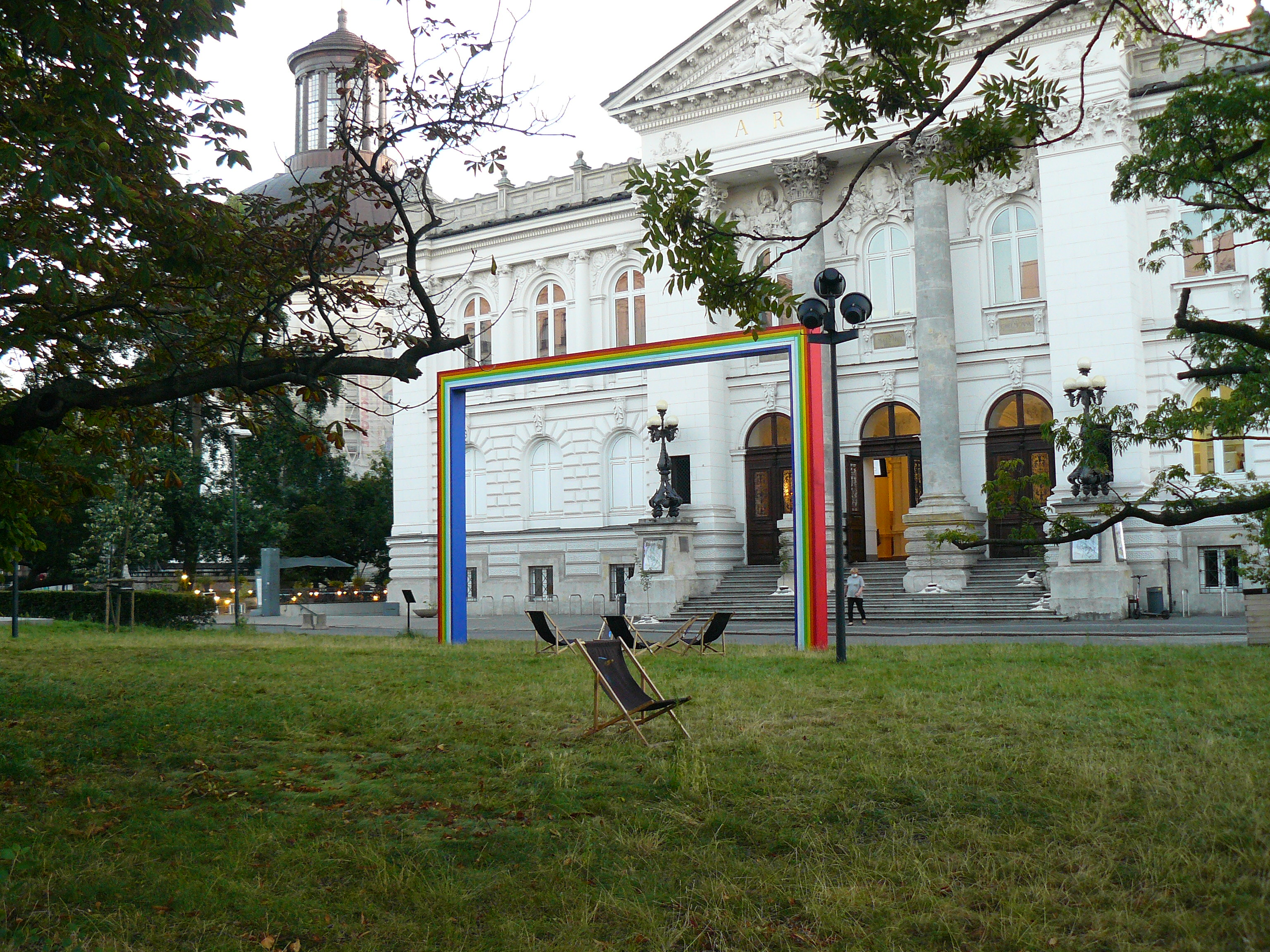
A rainbow was erected outside the Warsaw museum Zachęta National Gallery of Art in August 2020

More than 200 academics at universities in Poland and around the world signed a letter published on 12 August, including Judith Butler, Noam Chomsky, Roberto Esposito, and Jan T. Gross. The signatories "express our deep concern about the unprecedented attack on the LGBT + community in Poland" and "call on the Polish authorities to release Małgorzata Szutowicz immediately and to guarantee the rights of LGBT + people". On 18 August, 75 celebrities including Ed Harris, Pedro Almodóvar, James Norton, Slavoj Žižek, and Margaret Atwood published an open letter (addressed to Ursula von der Leyen, president of the European Commission) in Gazeta Wyborcza. The letter asks the European Commission "to take immediate steps to defend core European values – equality, non-discrimination, respect for minorities – which are being blatantly violated in Poland" and calls upon the Polish government "to hold accountable those who are responsible for unlawful and violent arrests of August 7, 2020" and "to stop targeting sexual minorities". As of 17 August, neither von der Leyen nor Charles Michel, president of the European Council, has made a statement on the incident.

On 2 September, the police crackdown was discussed by the Sejm's internal affairs committee. A representative of the police did not answer all questions posed by opposition MPs, refusing to say why it was necessary to arrest the demonstrators.

The events have been dubbed "Polish Stonewall" by some LGBTQ activists and media, in an analogy to the 1969 Stonewall riots in New York.

== See also ==
- 2020–2021 women's strike protests in Poland
- Democratic backsliding
  - Polish constitutional crisis
- Poland and the European Union
