= Workforce casualisation =

Shift from stable to often contractual labor relations

Workforce casualisation is the process in which employment shifts from a preponderance of full-time and permanent positions to casual and contract positions.

In Australia, 35% of all workers are casual or contract employees who are not paid for sick leave or annual leave. While there has been considerable talk of the increasing casualisation of the workforce, data shows that figures have actually remained relatively stable since the turn of the century with the greatest changes occurring in the period between 1992 and 1997 (casual only, not contracted employees). The greater concern is the increase in "insecure employment", which is difficult to quantify due to no clear definition of what this actually means.

In the United Kingdom, 53% of academics teaching or conducting research in British universities are on some form of insecure, non-permanent contract, ranging from short-term contracts that typically elapse within nine months to those paid by the hour to give classes or mark essays and exams.

== See also ==
- Casual work
- Change management
- Contingent workforce
- Contingent work
- Gig economy
- Permatemp
- Precariat
- Precarious work
- Temporary work
- Zero-hour contract
