= Stop Bullshit =

Polish anarchist-queer collective

- Stop Bzdurom
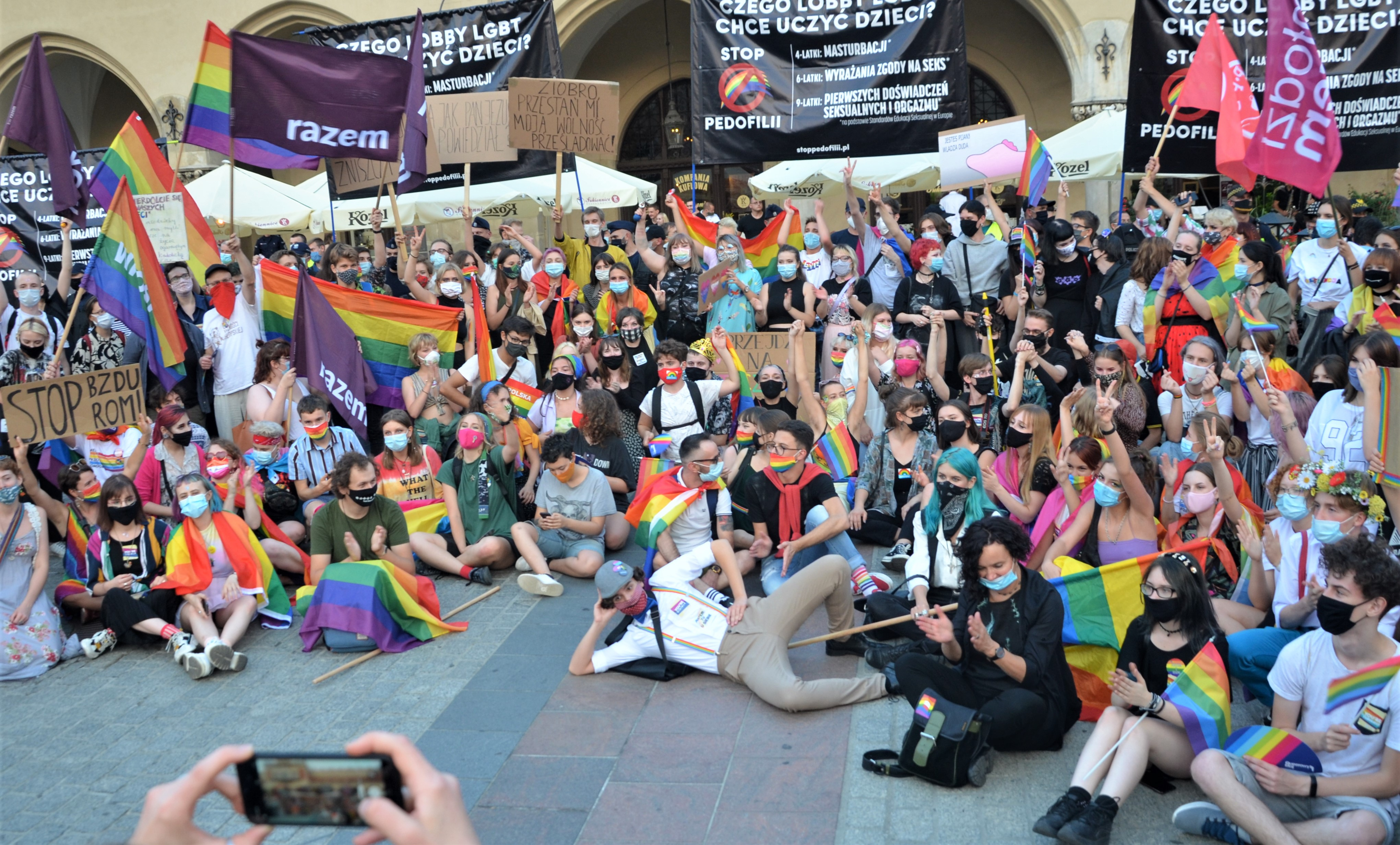
- Stop Bzdurom collective during the 2020 Kraków Equality March. In the background, banners of the Pro Foundation.
- Established: 15 May 2019; 7 years ago
- Founders: Małgorzata "Margot" Szutowicz; Zuzanna "Łania" Madej
- Dissolved: 8 August 2021; 5 years ago
- Purpose: LGBT rights activism
- Location: Warsaw, Poland

Stop Bullshit (Polish: Stop Bzdurom) (Note: The direct translation of "Stop Bzdurom" is often given as "Stop Nonsense", but the organization translates itself as "Stop Bullshit") was a queer anarchist collective in Warsaw with the goal of fighting homophobia and transphobia, founded in May 2019 by Małgorzata "Margot" Szutowicz and Zuzanna "Łania" Madej, opposing the actions of the Pro Foundation.

A series of direct actions carried out by the collective in the summer of 2020 provoked a wide media attention and a deeply polarized social discussion on the rights of LGBT+ people, attended by, among others representatives of the world of culture, science, the highest levels of Polish politics or the hierarchs of the Catholic Church in Poland.

The organization disbanded itself in 2021.

== Views ==
In a BBC interview in September 2020, Szutowicz explained: "I want to show my community that we no longer have to live in fear [...] For years we've been asking for minimal provisions and legislation that would protect us – if not from discrimination, then at least from physical violence." Regarding whether violence was a valid method of resistance, she answered: "People who have not lived the lives of the LGBT community in this country shouldn't judge us [...] And nobody should be surprised if we are eventually forced to take things into our own hands."

While detained, Szutowicz went on a hunger strike and requested a New Testament, later stating that Christianity is too serious a matter to be left in Polish Catholics' hands. Margot also stated that she is a Christian.

== Activity ==
The collective started its activity in May 2019, in opposition to the activity of the Pro Foundation, whose volunteers collected signatures under the civic legislative initiative Stop Pedophilia Act, for which the collective is named. The draft act assumed increased penalties for pedophilic acts, but also, under the pretext of counteracting these acts, penalized sex education. The impulse for an organized action, and at the same time a clear turning point, marking the transformation of current activist activity by Małgorzata "Margot" Szutowicz and Łania Madej into the Stop Bzdurom collective were the repercussions after a verbal skirmish between them and several passers-by with the Pro Foundation volunteers, which took place on 15 May 2019 at the Warsaw "Pan" (the square in front of the Metro Centrum entrance). As a result, there was a struggle between passers-by and members of the Foundation and the police. Several people were arrested at that time, including Małgorzata Szutowicz.

After the events in the center of Warsaw, Łania Madej and Małgorzata Szutowicz decided to set up the Stop Bzdurom collective. Initially, its aim was to oppose the activities of the Pro Foundation, as well as to create more theories about anti-LGBT rhetoric, and fight against disinformation regarding sex education. The collective advocated a radical and grass-roots fight for the rights of LGBT+ people. It often expressed its attachment to anarchist ideas and skepticism towards mainstream politics.

The collective initially organized a series of dance events in front of the stands of the Pro Foundation. They aroused interest in the public space, thanks to which the collective engaged in further activities; launched a website and a fanpage on Facebook, through which it denied the information provided by the Pro Foundation. Leaflets explaining what sex education is and explaining some of the terms related to it were also printed and distributed. The collective was involved in many other educational and support activities for the LGBT community in Poland.

In June 2020, during the election campaign preceding the presidential election, the collective organized an event in front of the Presidential Palace in Warsaw, entitled "A provocation of LGBT ideology", which was supposed to be a response to the statement of President Andrzej Duda, who said during a rally in Brzeg that LGBT are not people, but ideology.

=== Destruction of banners on delivery vans ===
One of the goals of the Pro Foundation is to limit the right to perform abortion. Its attitude is popularized by, among others by showing pictures of dead children and fetuses in public spaces. The organization does this most often by displaying banners, placing posters on billboards, as well as trucks with photos driving around the city. These actions, organized in various Polish cities, aroused much controversy and were also directly attacked. After launching the "Stop Pedophilia" campaign, the Foundation started putting vans with banners on the roads, with slogans about alleged links between homosexuality and pedophilia, as well as opposing sex education.

==== The event on Wilcza Street ====
In June 2020, there were posts on the collective's Facebook profile regarding the stoppage of trucks of the Pro Foundation, as well as the painting over their license plates and tarpaulins. On 27 June, at Wilcza Street in Warsaw (near the Syrena squat), one of the vans was detained and then destroyed by a group of people. During the incident, Małgorzata Szutowicz was alleged to have attacked the driver of the vehicle. The fragment of the recording of the incident, published by the foundation, shows that Łania Madej also participated in the event. Margot told the BBC that she only attempted to stop the truck driver from filming her with his mobile phone and did not assault him: "I wish I could have beat him up – but he was three or four times larger than me."

On the morning of 14 July, the police in civilian clothes entered the apartment where Małgorzata Szutowicz was staying. According to the reports of those present at the scene, the officers first threatened to force the door open, and after opening it, they did not give the reason for the attack and did not allow their date to be written down. The activist was led out of the apartment without shoes and not informed of her whereabouts. On the following day, the District Court for Warsaw-Mokotów rejected the prosecutor's request for a 2-month detention of Małgorzata Szutowicz.

=== Hanging flags on monuments ===
On the night of 28–29 July, the Stop Bzdurom, Gang Samzamęt and Poetka collectives organized a civil disobedience campaign involving the display of rainbow flags on Warsaw monuments. There was also an ideological proclamation next to each one, and on some of them pink scarves with the symbol of queer anarchism were hung. The monuments with flags were the monuments of Józef Piłsudski, Nicolaus Copernicus, Jesus Christ, Wincenty Witos, and the Mermaids. The action generated discourse on the Internet almost immediately. It also caused a lot of controversy, especially related to the hanging of the flag on the statue of Jesus Christ at the Holy Cross Church in Warsaw. The case was discussed in nationwide media, and conservative circles accused the people participating in the action of profanation. Prime Minister Mateusz Morawiecki also reacted to the event by lighting a candle at the statue of Jesus Christ on 29 July and commenting on the event with the words: "We will not make the mistakes of the West. Tolerance towards barbarity leads to this." On 6 August, after being sworn in for another term, Andrzej Duda laid flowers at the monument.

In the days following the hanging of flags on Warsaw's monuments, the Warsaw Police Headquarters arrested three people associated with the action, including members of the Stop Bzdurom collective. The manner in which Małgorzata Szutowicz was arrested, who was detained by plainclothes officers in the middle of the day on the street, was particularly criticized. These actions were carried out at the request of the Deputy Minister of Justice Sebastian Kaleta, who applied to the prosecutor's office for insulting religious feelings and insulting Warsaw monuments. The activists were released soon, but on 7 August, the Warsaw court examined the complaint of the District Prosecutor's Office in Warsaw against the court's earlier decision not to arrest and ordered Małgorzata Szutowicz to be detained for 2 months. The grounds for the decision were initially classified by the prosecutor's office, but were eventually disclosed. The reasons were given as "fear of fleeing or hiding", "high probability of committing the alleged act", as well as the fear of "taking unlawful actions influencing the course of the proceedings". The decision was negatively addressed by, inter alia, the Council of Europe's Human Rights Commissioner – Dunja Mijatović and the President of Court Watch Polska – Bartosz Pilitowski.

==== Protests on 7 August ====
During the next arrest of Małgorzata Szutowicz, which took place in front of the Campaign Against Homophobia, there were protests, during which 48 people were arrested. After the events, police actions were criticized as being too brutal and also far exceeding the required minimum. The Ombudsman, Adam Bodnar, referred to the case, noting that the police caught random people on the street and then arrested them. The Polish authorities have been accused in many media of using the police repressive apparatus to persecute sexual minorities. In response to allegations of brutality, on 10 August, the police released videos of the protesters' behavior. After the events related to the arrest of Małgorzata Szutowicz, solidarity actions were organized all over Poland and abroad. Demonstration in Warsaw at the Parade Square gathered several thousand people. The foreign media also spoke about the whole case. An open letter was also sent to the Polish authorities, demanding that Małgorzata Szutowicz be released from custody and that the rights of LGBT persons be guaranteed. The letter was signed by several hundred scholars from around the world, including: Natalia Aleksiun, Maurice Aymard, Daniel Beauvois, Judith Butler, Noam Chomsky, Natalie Zemon Davis and Galit Hasan-Rokem. There was also a letter signed by people of culture (signed, among others, by Pedro Almodóvar, Margaret Atwood, Richard Flanagan, Ed Harris, Slavoj Žižek and Olga Tokarczuk), as well as persons supporting Margot (including Adam Boniecki, Maja Komorowska, Michael Schudrich, Paula Sawicka, Alfred Wierzbicki and Jacek Jassem).

Margot was misgendered by Polish police and right-wing politicians. Zuzanna "Łania" Madej (Szutowicz's partner) said that using Szutowicz's masculine name is not offensive. Some media outlets, such as Onet.pl and Radio Nowy Świat, also used Szutowicz's masculine deadname. The latter started using Margot's preferred name after backlash and threats of having its donations cut off by supporters. It also led to the resignation of the chairman Piotr Jedliński.

On 4 September 2020, Margot was released from imprisonment after a successful legal appeal. Following her release, she posted a photograph holding up her middle finger and holding a scrabble sign saying "Poland, you preek [sic], stop arresting my Margot". On 7 September 2020, a protest in support of Margot was held in front of the martyrdom monument at Old Market square, Bydgoszcz.

=== Disestablishment ===
In mid-2021, the leaders of Stop Bzdurom dissolved it since they no longer wanted to work as a public group. In an interview, Małgorzata Szutowicz said that having a public position with the media was not helpful for reaching her goals and that she was now working in the background to support other groups.

== Significance and legacy ==
The actions of Stop Bzdurom have drawn academic attention as an example of youth-led activism challenging discrimination and reclaiming public space. Scholars noted the symbolic importance of the group's protests, especially those following the arrest of co-founder Margot in August 2020.
