= Senate Constituency no. 44 =

District of the Polish Senate

44 - Warsaw
- Constituency for the Senate of Poland
- Districts: Białołęka, Bielany, Śródmieście, Żoliborz

Current constituency
- Created: 2011
- Senator: Adam Bodnar

Poland's 44th Senate district is one of 100 Polish Senate districts which elect one member of the Senate using first-past-the-post voting. Incumbent senator is Adam Bodnar (Independent).

The district was created in 2011 when the Polish Senate moved from multi-member constituencies to single-member constituencies.

== District profile ==
The district encompasses four districts of Warsaw: Żoliborz, Białołęka, Bielany and Śródmieście.

== Members of Senate ==
Election	Member	Party
2011	Barbara Borys-Damięcka	Independent (Civic Platform)
2015	Barbara Borys-Damięcka	Independent (Civic Platform)
2019	Kazimierz Ujazdowski	Civic Platform (Civic Coalition)
2023	Adam Bodnar	Independent (Civic Coalition)

== Election results ==
2011 parliamentary election
Party	Candidate	Votes	%	±%
PO	Barbara Borys-Damięcka	196,735	60.7	−
PiS	Katarzyna Łaniewska-Błaszczak	99,884	30.8	−
PSL	Włodzimierz Izban	15,447	4.8	−
Independent	Jerzy Krzekotowski	11,995	3.7	−
Majority		96,851	29.9	N/A
Turnout		334,756	73.7	N/A

2015 parliamentary election
Party	Candidate	Votes	%	±%
PO	Barbara Borys-Damięcka	164,796	43.4	−17.3
PiS	Anna Anders	154,746	40.8	+10.0
OdP	Katarzyna Pawlak	60,076	15.8	-
Majority		10,050	2.6	−27.3
Turnout		393,812	75.8	+2.1

2019 parliamentary election
Party	Candidate	Votes	%	±%
PO (KO)	Kazimierz Ujazdowski	308,627	55.3	+11.8
PiS	Marek Rudnicki	164,242	29.4	−11.4
ORP	Paweł Kasprzak	85,720	15.4	−
Majority		144,385	25.9	+23.3
Turnout		571,008	84.1	+8.3

2023 parliamentary election
Party	Candidate	Votes	%	±%
Independent (KO)	Adam Bodnar	628,442	76.47	+21.17
PiS	Alicja Żebrowska	193,356	23.53	−5.87
Majority		435,086	52.94	+27.04
Turnout		821,798	85.65	+1.55
