= Polish Penal Code =

Kodeks Karny is a criminal-law code. The name is often abbreviated KK.

Modern Polish legal history has seen the introduction of three penal codes: in 1932; in 1969, during the era; and in 1997. The last of those has been amended 101 times.

The Penal Code, with the Penal Procedure Code and the Fiscal Penal Code, together make up Poland's criminal justice system, often referred to as "penal code".

== Historical background ==
=== Situation after 1918 ===
After World War I, Poland regained its independence. One of the most important tasks of the new government was to unify the law inherited from the three partitioners' different legal systems. Hence, after the war there were five different legal systems in Poland. These were those of the German Empire in the West, of the Austria-Hungary Empire in the South, of the Russian Empire in the far East, of the former Congress Poland in the Center, and two tiny regions (Orava and Spiš) in the South with the Hungarian common law.

=== Codification Commission and the code of 1932 ===
In 1919 the first Codification Commission was created. It was divided into two sections; the first was to create a project of a penal code, the other—a civil code. The most prominent representative of the Penal Commission was professor Juliusz Makarewicz. Works finished in 1931, and the code was enacted by the President's regulation on July 11, 1932. Often called the Code of Makarewicz, the code of 1932 is perceived by the Polish jurisprudence to be an exquisite example of the modern penology. It consisted of 295 articles in 42 chapters. The first 92 articles constituted the general part of the code, defining different terms, conditions, and penalties. The following 203 articles was a catalogue of felonies grouped in 26 chapters. Article 1 of the code defined the penal responsibility, stating that a person is a subject to punishment only when its conduct constituted a criminal offence at the time when it took place. This fundamental rule of the modern criminal law made the code a very up-to-date document. Professor Juliusz Bardach observed that the Codification Commission, having followed three basic concepts, was able to create a fair example of penal legislation. These were the rule of subjectivism, the rule of humanitarianism, and the introduction of preventive measures. Subjectivism meant that the penal responsibility depended upon the perpetrator's intent and anticipation. The rule of humanitarianism was expressed in a very deliberate sentencing. For instance, the capital punishment was foreseen for 5 crimes only, always with the alternative of incarceration. The introduction of preventive measures, criticized by many lawyers, meant that mentally ill people and recidivists could be separated from the society. In the late 1930s, when the Polish government became very authoritarian, these preventive measures were used against those who opposed the régime. This led to the creation of the Bereza Kartuska prison, a very severe detention camp, also called a concentration camp.

=== World War II and its aftermath ===
On September 1, 1939 Poland was attacked by the Nazi army. On September 17, the Red Army invaded as well. Poland ceased to exist, and so did its penal law. The Nazi occupation was very harsh for Polish society, and all its Jewish members were put into ghettoes. Later, when Die Endlösung policy was carried out, any help to the Jewish people was scourged, by and large to death. In the time of war the rule of nullum crimen sine lege went for nothing. After the war Poland became a communist state, with a totalitarian régime. Although the new government upheld the Penal Code of 1932, it was not an obstacle for putting political enemies to jails. Special national security acts issued in the late 1940s and early 1950s, allowed communist judges to sentence many people to death without a fair trial. Many people went missing. After the thaw of 1956, often called the Polish October, this situation began to change.

=== The code of 1969 ===
The codification of the civil law was much more important for the communist régime than codifying the Penal Code. After minor changes, the elastic Code of 1932 remained in force. Works on a new code began only after the communist régime ripened under Władysław Gomułka in the 1960s. Chaired by Jerzy Sawicki and Władysław Wolter, the Codification Commission put forward a project in 1963. However, it was refuted as too progressive. The next commission, moderated by prof. Andrejew, proposed a draft of the new code in 1968. Without much discussion, it was implemented the following year. Intended to protect the communist régime, the code of 1969 was very repressive and inhibitory.

=== The abolition of communism and the works on a new penal code ===
In the late 1980s, when the régime was losing its powers, the Penal Law Reform Commission was formed. Its works sped up in 1989 when the communist régime collapsed and Tadeusz Mazowiecki became the prime minister. The Commission, influenced by its two most prominent figures, prof. Kazimierz Buchała and prof. Andrzej Zoll, proposed a very liberal draft, which constituted an anathema to the code of 1969.

== The Penal Code of 1997 ==
=== Main Characteristics ===
==== Structure ====
The code is divided into three parts. Bearing the name general, the first part is a scaffolding for the whole code. It defines basic terms, types of sanctions and regulates all aspects of penal responsibility. It is composed of 15 chapters divided into 116 articles. The second part of the code is a catalogue of crimes, including penalties foreseen for each of them. It is made up by 200 articles (Art. 117 to Art 316) gathered into 22 chapters (Chapter XVI to Chapter XXXVII). The third part defines crimes that can be committed by active soldiers only. It is composed of 46 articles grouped into 7 chapters.

==== Mitigation of punishment ====
In his paper The Commutation of Penal Liability, Janusz Kochanowski stated that the main characteristic of the new code was the commutation of penal liability on three different levels. In result, in comparison with the previous code, out of 314 types of crimes, in 131 cases the maximum imprisonment period was lowered, in 203 cases the minimum imprisonment period was lowered, in 50 cases both were lowered, and in 8 cases the capital punishment was repealed. For instance, the maximum punishment for espionage was lowered by 3 times, from 25 years to 8 years' imprisonment, and the minimum punishment was lowered by 10 times, from 5 years to 6 months' imprisonment.

===== First-degree commutations =====
- Lowering the minimum incarceration period from 3 to 1 month
- Lowering the minimum restriction of freedom period from 3 to 1 month
- Commuting the restriction of freedom punishment
- Repealing the capital punishment and the sequestration of property
- Repealing the compulsory deprivation of public rights
- Limiting the catalogue of facultative deprivation of public rights
- Repealing the compulsory ban on occupying specified posts and prohibition on exercising a profession
- Limiting the possibility of making a sentence publicly known
- Repealing compulsory fine imposition supplementary to incarceration
- Repealing the possibility of fine imposition supplementary to 25 years and life imprisonment

===== Second-degree commutations =====
- Softening juvenile liability (13–17 years)
- Softening adolescent liability (17–21 years)
- Enabling extraordinary mitigation of punishment to an aider
- Enabling extraordinary mitigation of punishment to a cooperator without individual features
- Extending the use of the extraordinary mitigation of punishment
- Extending the use of the renouncement of inflicting a punishment
- Limiting the use of the extraordinary exacerbation of punishment
- Extending the use of conditional discontinuance of penal proceedings
- Extending the use of conditional stay of the carrying out of a sentence
- Extending the use conditional release from serving the full sentence
- Limiting the use of preventive measures
- Shortening the period of prescription and erasion of the entry in the register of convictions

===== Third-degree commutations =====
- The directive of milder punishment or resigning from punishment
- The rule of humanitarianism
- The rule of limiting guilt

=== Sanctions ===
Article 32 of the code is a catalogue of sanctions. These are:

==== Fine ====
It can be a specific amount or an amount of day rates. The latter means that the court first decides how many day rates shall be paid (from 10 to 360), and then decides what the day rate of the offender is (from 10 to 2000 PLN). Depending on the offender's income, fines vary from 100 PLN to 1 080 000 PLN, if not exacerbated, mitigated or for concurring crimes.

==== Restriction of freedom ====
The main goal of this sanction was to introduce the community service punishment, but since offender's consent is needed, it is not often used. Restriction of freedom can last from 1 to 24 months. The convict cannot change their dwelling-place without a court's consent, is obliged to perform the imposed work (20 to 40 hours a month or 10 to 25% of earnings instead), and is obliged to inform proper institutions about carrying out the punishment.

==== Imprisonment ====
The shortest imprisonment period is 1 month, the longest is 30 years. The conditional release from serving the full sentence is allowed after serving half of the full sentence.

==== 25 years' imprisonment ====
Since the 1st of October 2023, 25 years' imprisonment is no longer considered a separate punishment.

==== Life imprisonment ====
This very oppressive punishment is reserved to the most severe crimes. It is highest penalty imposed in Poland since the abolition of the death penalty in 1997. The crimes to which it applies include such as commencing an offensive warfare (Art. 117), genocide (Art. 123), conspiracy against the state (Art. 127) or homicide (Art. 148). The conditional release from serving the full sentence is allowed after 25 years.

=== Articles ===
==== Lèse-majesté ====
Article 135 states that anyone who publicly insults (Polish: kto publicznie znieważa) the President of Poland is punishable by up to three years of imprisonment.

==== Blasphemy ====
- Article 196, offending religious feelings

=== Trivia ===
==== Homicide ====
Three different types of homicide are foreseen by articles 148, 149 and 150 of the Code. Article 148 Sec. 1 describes the penalty for the basic type of the crime. It is penalized by no less than 8 years of imprisonment, 25 years' imprisonment or life imprisonment. Sections 2 and 3 introduce a more strict sentencing in cases of particular cruelty, using firearms or explosives, taking hostages, raping, robbery, multiple victims or relapse. In these cases the minimal imprisonment period rises to 12 years. On the other hand, Section 4 foresees a commuted penalty in case of a homicide under emotional strain. Such a reason allows the court to sentence between 1 and 10 years of imprisonment.

Articles 149 and 150 cover two very specific types of homicide. In both cases the penalty is fairly commuted. A homicide of a newborn by its mother is penalized with 3 months to 5 years' imprisonment. Similarly, euthantic homicide is penalized with 3 months to 5 years' imprisonment. In the latter case, in extraordinary conditions, the court may apply the extraordinary mitigation of punishment or even the renouncement of inflicting a punishment.

== Future developments ==
Due to the great number of amendments to the code, it has lost its original lucidity. Therefore, some Polish lawyers petition for a completely new codes, both penal and penal procedure, coherent with the most recent regulations of the EU.

== See also ==
- Law of Poland
- Crime in Poland
