= Adam Bodnar =

Polish human rights activist and ombudsman

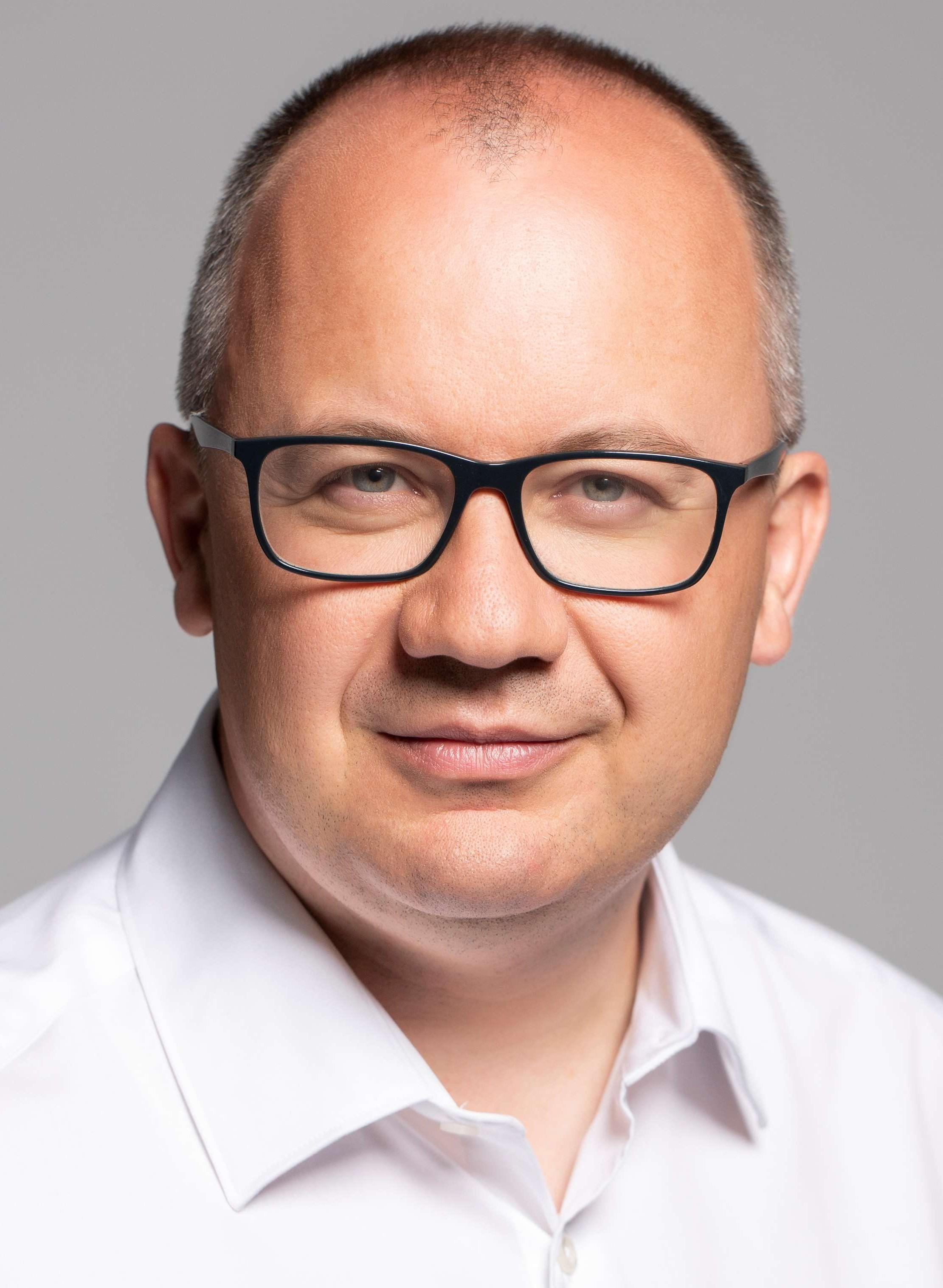
- Bodnar in 2023

Minister of Justice Public Prosecutor General
- In office 13 December 2023 – 24 July 2025
- Prime Minister: Donald Tusk
- Preceded by: Marcin Warchoł
- Succeeded by: Waldemar Żurek

Member of the Senate
- Incumbent
- Assumed office 13 November 2023
- Constituency: 44-Warsaw

7th Polish Ombudsman
- In office 9 September 2015 – 15 July 2021
- Preceded by: Irena Lipowicz
- Succeeded by: Marcin Wiącek

Personal details
- Born: 6 January 1977 (age 49) Trzebiatów, Poland
- Party: Independent
- Other political affiliations: Civic Coalition/Senate Pact 2023 (2023–present)
- Children: 3
- Education: University of Warsaw; Central European University (Budapest)
- Awards: Thorolf Rafto Memorial Prize (2018); Rule of Law Award (2019); Legion of Honour (2020)

Adam Piotr Bodnar (born 6 January 1977) is a Polish lawyer, educator, human rights activist and politician who served as Minister of Justice from 2023 to 2025. He was the 7th Polish Ombudsman from 2015 until July 2021.

== Life and career ==
He was born into Polish–Ukrainian family. His Ukrainian father, as a child, was forcibly displaced from a village near Sanok to north-west Poland in Operation Vistula. In 2000, he graduated in law from the University of Warsaw, and in 2001 he obtained a Master of Law degree in the field of comparative constitutional law from the Central European University in Budapest. He also completed a course in European Law co-organized with Cambridge University as well as American Law co-organized with the University of Florida at the Faculty of Law and Administration of the University of Warsaw. In 2006, he received a PhD degree from the University of Warsaw on the basis of his dissertation entitled Multi-level Citizenship in the European Constitutional Sphere. In 2019, he obtained habilitation at his alma mater.

== In academics ==
He worked as an assistant professor at the Department of Human Rights of the Faculty of Law and Administration of the University of Warsaw as well as academic teacher at the SWPS University of Social Sciences and Humanities in Warsaw.

== Human rights activism ==
In the 1990s he collaborated with the anti-racist "Never Again" Association. Until 2004, he worked at the Weil, Gotshal & Manges law office. He then became a member of the Helsinki Human Rights Foundation (Polish: Helsińska Fundacja Praw Człowieka). In 2008, he served as an expert at the European Union Agency for Fundamental Rights (FRA) where he specialized in the observance of human rights in Poland. In 2010, he was appointed deputy director of the Helsinki Human Rights Foundation. He also served as chairman of the Panoptykon Foundation as well as Director of the Zbigniew Hołda Association. He was also a member of the board of directors of the UN Fund for Victims of Torture. In 2011 he was awarded with the Tolerance Prize by the Polish LGBT organizations and in 2013 he received a scholarship within the scope of German Marshall Memorial Fellowship programme.

== As Ombudsman ==
In 2015, he was appointed as the Polish Ombudsman after receiving endorsement of the Civic Platform, Democratic Left Alliance and Polish People's Party. During his tenure he brought a number of local governments to court for their introduction of the controversial LGBT-free zones, which met with criticism from the ruling conservative Law and Justice party. In 2018, he was awarded the Thorolf Rafto Memorial Prize for the promotion of the fundamental human rights of intellectual and political freedom.

In 2017-2019 the Civil Rights Ombudsman Adam Bodnar supported the 'Let's Kick Racism Out Of Stadiums' tournament, organized by "Never Again" Association at the Pol'and'Rock Festival (also known as Polish Woodstock), the biggest open-air free music festival in Europe. Bodnar officially inaugurated the tournaments, personally refereed during the games and took part in the matches. He participated in a meeting organised by "Never Again" Association during the festival and spoke about the cases of homophobic violence in Poland.

== Awards ==
In 2019, he was awarded the Rule of Law Award conferred by the World Justice Project for his "outstanding efforts in strengthening the rule of law in difficult circumstances". He dedicated the award to Karol Modzelewski. The same year he received the Human Dignity Award from the Roland Berger Foundation; however, he declined the award motivating his decision by the Nazi past of the award founder's father. In September 2020, he was awarded the French Order of Legion of Honour for guarding the civic rights and values in Poland. Bodnar has appeared in leading universities' events including at Yale.

Bodnar's five-year term of office expired in September 2020. The two chambers of the Polish parliament (the Sejm and the Senate) could not agree on a successor. On 15 April 2021, the Constitutional Tribunal issued a ruling that he should stay in office for at most three further months.

In the 2023 parliamentary elections he ran as a Civic Coalition candidate (as part of Senate Pact 2023) for the Senate from the constituency no. 44. He received 628,442 votes and was elected senator. In December 2023, he was appointed as the minister of justice in Donald Tusk's third cabinet.

In May 2026, President of Germany Steinmeier presented the Hambach Freedom Prize ('Hambacher Freiheitspreis') to Bodnar. He praised the laureate as a passionate champion of human rights, democracy and the rule of law.

== Selected publications ==
- The Emerging Constitutional Law of the European Union. German and Polish Perspectives (co-author), Springer, Berlin 2003.
- Introduction to Polish Law (co-author with Stanisław Frankowski), Kluwer Law International, The Hague 2005.
- Przekonania moralne władzy publicznej a wolność jednostki. Materiały z konferencji z dnia 23 stycznia 2006 r. (co-author), Zakład Praw Człowieka. Wydział Prawa i Administracji. University of Warsaw, Warsaw 2007.
- Obywatelstwo wielopoziomowe. Status jednostki w europejskiej przestrzeni konstytucyjnej, Wydawnictwo Sejmowe, Warsaw 2008.
- Orientacja seksualna i tożsamość płciowa. Aspekty prawne i społeczne (co-author), Instytut Wydawniczy EuroPrawo, Warsaw 2009.
- Fakt vs. Opinia. Rozważania na kanwie sprawy Michnik vs. Zybertowicz. Materiały z konferencji zorganizowanej przez Obserwatorium Wolności Mediów w Polsce w dniu 26 marca 2009 roku, Helsińska Fundacja Praw Człowieka, Warsaw 2010.
- Pr@wo w sieci. Korzyści czy zagrożenia dla wolności słowa? Materiały z konferencji zorganizowanej przez Obserwatorium Wolności Mediów w Polsce w dniu 11 maja 2009 roku (co-author), Helsińska Fundacja Praw Człowieka, Warsaw 2010.
- Wolność słowa w prasie lokalnej. Prasa lokalna a normy ochrony konkurencji i pluralizm medialny. Materiały z konferencji zorganizowanej przez Obserwatorium Wolności Mediów w Polsce w dniu 29 października 2009 roku (co-author), Helsińska Fundacja Praw Człowieka, Warsaw 2010.
- Postępowania dyscyplinarne w wolnych zawodach prawniczych – model ustrojowy i praktyka. Materiały z konferencji z dnia 5 marca 2012 r. (co-author), Helsińska Fundacja Praw Człowieka, Warsaw 2013.
- Listy od przyjaciół. Księga pamiątkowa dla Profesora Wiktora Osiatyńskiego (editor), Helsińska Fundacja Praw Człowieka and Open Society Foundations, Warsaw 2015.
- Ochrona praw obywatelek i obywateli Unii Europejskiej. 20 lat – osiągnięcia i wyzwania na przyszłość (co-author), Wolters Kluwer, Warsaw 2018.
- Wpływ Europejskiej Konwencji Praw Człowieka na funkcjonowanie biznesu (co-author), Wolters Kluwer, Warsaw 2016.
- Wykonywanie orzeczeń Europejskiego Trybunału Praw Człowieka w Polsce. Wymiar instytucjonalny, Wolters Kluwer Polska, Warsaw 2018, ISBN 978-83-8124-542-5.

== See also ==
- Politics of Poland
- Ombudsman
- Third Cabinet of Donald Tusk
