= Lipowicz =

Lipowicz is a surname. Notable people with this surname include:

- Leonard R. Lipowicz (1895–1981), American lawyer
- Irena Lipowicz (born 1953), Polish politician, official, and diplomat
- Zac Lipowicz (born 2002), Polish-Australian rugby league footballer
