= Bartłomiej Wróblewski =

Polish politician, lecturer and lawyer

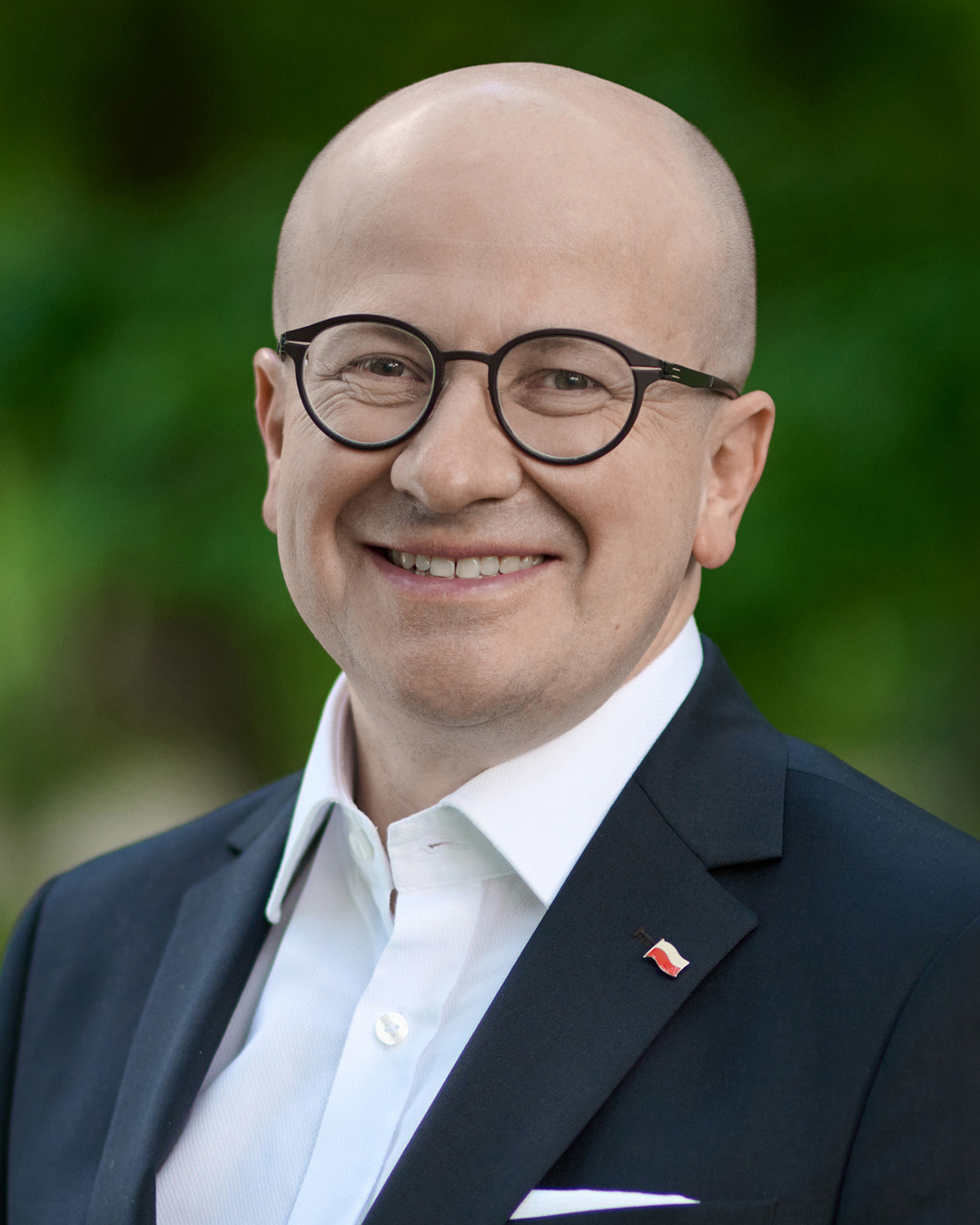
Bartłomiej Piotr Wróblewski in 2024

Bartłomiej Piotr Wróblewski (born March 13, 1975, in Poznań) is a Polish politician, lecturer and lawyer. He is a member of the Sejm from Law and Justice.

== Education ==
In 2000 Wróblewski graduated in law from Adam Mickiewicz University in Poznań. Later, he studied in the University of Bonn and the University of Bamberg. In 2009, he obtained his doctor's degree in law in his alma mater - Adam Mickiewicz University in Poznań. His academic specialization is: constitutional law, European law and human rights.

== Writing ==
He is an author of numerous papers and six books: “State Liability for Illegal Legislative Acts in Germany” (Nomos Verlagsgesellschaft, Baden-Baden 2005), “Non-contractual liability of the European Community for its normative acts” (Wydawnictwo Instytutu Zachodniego, Poznań 2005) and “State Liability for Legislative Acts in the Context of General State Liability Rules. The Development of the Concepts and Institutions until the mid-20th century” (Wydawnictwo C. H. Beck, Warsaw 2011), State Liability and the Law: A Historical and Comparative Analysis (Routledge, London, New York 2023).

== Career ==
He worked for Western Institute and the Chancellery of the President of the Republic of Poland. Now Wróblewski is an assistant professor in SWPS University of Social Sciences and Humanities (earlier he was a director of Law Institute).

In 2015 he was elected to the Sejm, getting 14,108 votes in 39 Poznań district with a number 11 ranking on the Law and Justice list. As a Member of Parliament Wróblewski is a chairman of Polish-German Parliamentary Group, Polish-Irish Parliamentary Group and a vice-chairman of Polish-English Parliamentary Group. He also presides over the Permanent Subcommittee of Election and Administrative Code Amendments. He filed a motion with the Constitutional Tribunal questioning whether Poland's laws against abortion covered abortion due to serious fetal defects, prompting criticism from pro-choice activists.

In 2020, he was appointed as Poland’s representative to the board of the Polish-German Foundation for Science, where he was elected vice-chairman.

In March 2021 Wróblewski was nominated for the position of the Polish Ombudsman by Law and Justice. On April 15, 2021, the Polish Sejm chose him to become the Polish Ombudsman (240 MPs voted "for", 201 "against" and 11, including Wróblewski, "abstained"). However, on May 13, 2021, the Polish Senate rejected by one vote the nomination.

He was a chairman and he is vice-chairman of free market commission. He is the author of bills concerning homeschooling, the elimination of local gas monopolies, and the removal of unnecessary administrative and legal barriers, as well as the author of draft bills supporting non-municipal schools, establishing the Polish Institute of Family and Demography, and reducing bureaucracy and legal barriers. He prepared several Sejm resolutions, including those on the Volhynia genocide, the Prussian Homage, postwar anti-communist resistance, Greater Poland’s insurrectionary traditions, and organic work.

== Achievements ==
- Medal "For Freedom, Law, and Bread" from the June 1956 Uprising Association "Unconquered" (2017)
- Medal "Faithful to Tradition" from the Society for the Memory of the Greater Poland Uprising 1918-1919 for contributions to promoting knowledge and memory of the uprising (2022)
- Special Award from the Ombudsman for Small and Medium Enterprises for preparing and guiding a deregulation bill through the Sejm (2023)
- Honorary Badge "In Defense of Polish Land" from the People’s Party Ojcowizna RP for opposing the so-called "Five for Animals" legislation (2023)

== Alpinizm ==
Bartłomiej Wróblewski is also mountaineer. In 1998-2014 he reached the Seven Summits.
