= Tadeusz Zieliński (politician) =

Polish lawyer and politician

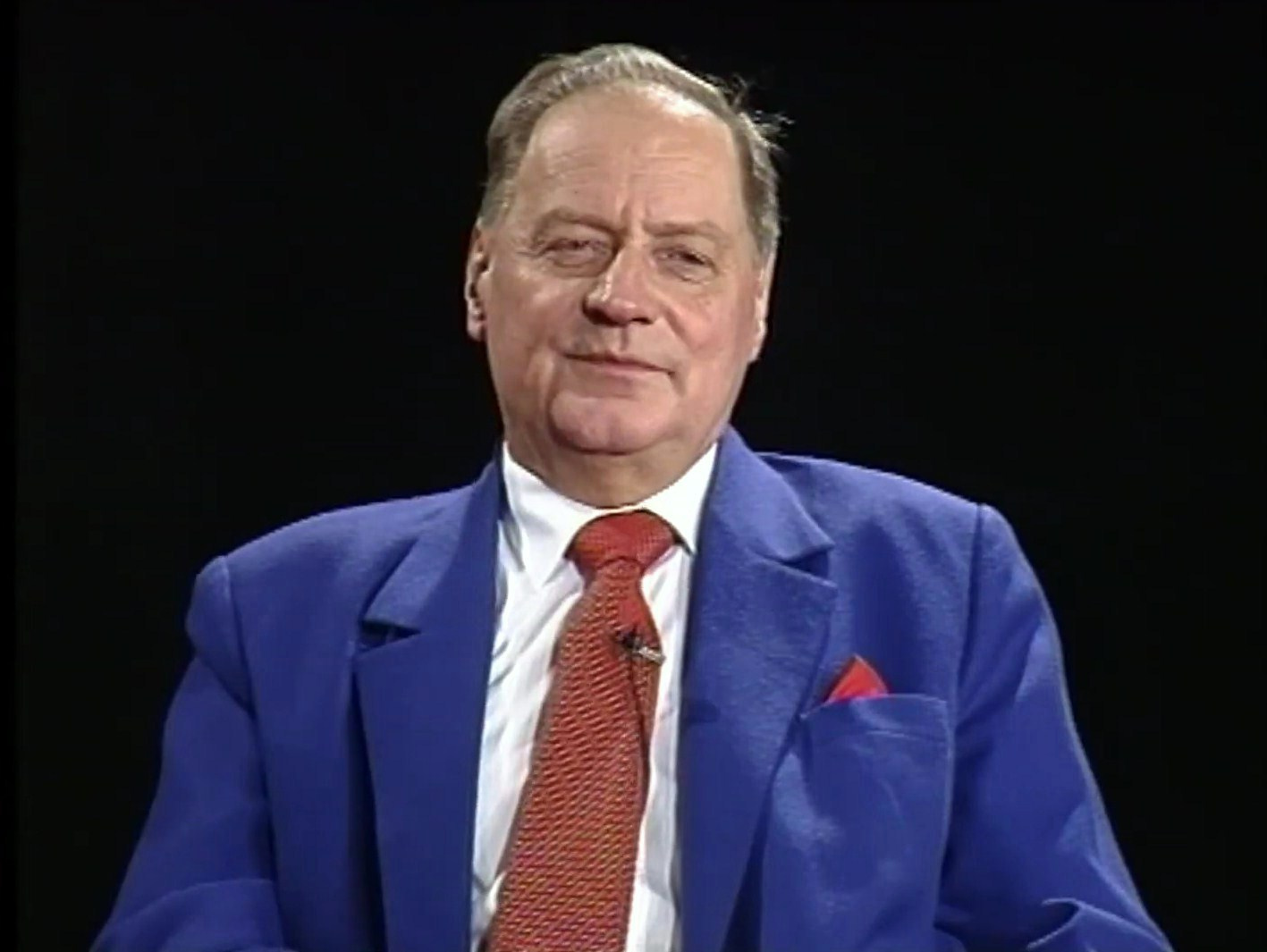
- Zieliński in 1993

Minister of Labour and Social Policy
- In office 4 January 1997 – 31 October 1997
- Prime Minister: Włodzimierz Cimoszewicz
- Preceded by: Andrzej Bączkowski
- Succeeded by: Longin Komołowski

Member of the Senate
- In office 18 June 1989 – 25 November 1991

2nd Polish Ombudsman
- In office 13 February 1992 – 8 May 1996
- Preceded by: Ewa Łętowska
- Succeeded by: Adam Zieliński

Personal details
- Born: 19 June 1926 Kraków, Polish People's Republic
- Died: 28 September 2003 (aged 77) Kraków, Poland

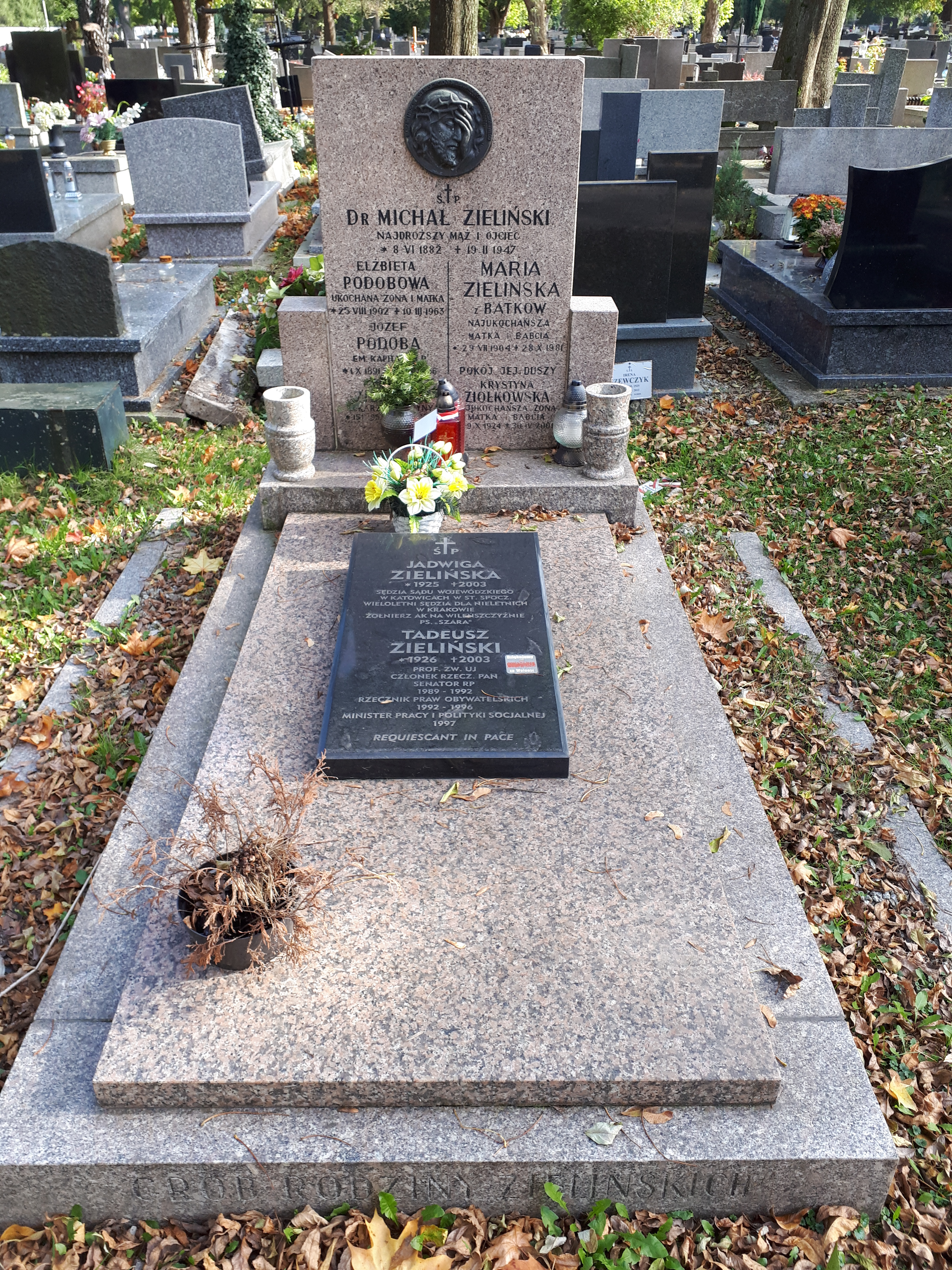
Gravestone of Tadeusz Zieliński in Rakowicke Cemetery, Kraków

Tadeusz Zieliński (19 June 1926 – 28 September 2003) was a Polish lawyer, politician, and labour law specialist. He was a Senator of the first term Senate, Commissioner for Human Rights in 1992–1996, and Minister in the cabinet of Włodzimierz Cimoszewicz. Candidate for President in 1995.

== Biography ==
Zieliński graduated the Faculty of Law and Administration of the Jagiellonian University in 1947. He obtained his doctoral degree in 1950 and post-doctoral degree in 1968. Between 1969 and 1981 he was a professor at the University of Silesia in Katowice, and from 1982 to 1996 a professor of the Jagiellonian University. From 1994 he was a member of the Polish Academy of Sciences, for two years he sat in its presidium. He announced over 200 scientific publications.

He was an expert of "Solidarity", member of the Helsinki Committee in Poland, and took part in the Round Table Agreement. He worked in the Solidarity's Center of Citizens' Initiatives. In 1989–1991, he sat in the first term Senate for Solidarity Citizens' Committees. During the term he defected to the Democratic Union.

Between 1992 and 1996 he was the Commissioner for Human Rights, elected over Zbigniew Romaszewski. In 1995 he was the candidate of the Labour Union in that year's presidential elections, where he won 631 432 votes (3,53%), taking 6th place. He was endorsed by the National Party of Retirees and Pensioners, Polish Socialist Party and Polish Socialist Party – Freedom, Equality, Independence.

After the death of Andrzej Bączkowski in 1997 he served the role of Minister of Labour and Social Policy in the Cimoszewicz cabinet.

In 1996 he became a recipient of the Order of Polonia Restituta.

Buried at the Rakowice Cemetery in Kraków.

== Publications ==
- Nieważne rozwiązanie stosunku pracy (1968)
- Stosunek prawa pracy do prawa administracyjnego (1977)
- Prawo pracy. Zarys systemu (cz. 1–3, 1986)
- Podstawy rozwoju prawa pracy (1988)
- Klauzule generalne w prawie pracy (1988)
- Podstawy rozwoju prawa pracy (1988)
- Ubezpieczenia społeczne pracowników (1993)
- Ombudsman – możliwości i granice działania Rzecznika Praw Obywatelskich Rzeczypospolitej Polskiej (1994)
- Prawo pracy (1996)
- Ład społeczny w Polsce i Niemczech na tle jednoczącej się Europy (1999)
- Czas prawa i bezprawia (1999)
- Komentarz do kodeksu pracy (2000)
- Labirynt praw i obyczajów. Zapiski z końca XX wieku (2001)

== Bibliography ==
- Bogdan Snoch (2006), Górnośląski Leksykon Biograficzny. Suplement do wydania drugiego, Katowice: Muzeum Śląskie, p. 126, ISBN 83-60353-11-5
- "Prof. dr hab. Tadeusz Zieliński – Rzecznik Praw Obywatelskich II kadencji (1992–1996)", rpo.gov.pl
- Stanisław Waltoś (2001), "Profesor Tadeusz Zieliński – laudacja z okazji uroczystego odnowienia doktoratu", Alma Mater, no. 36
- "Tadeusz Zieliński". Information Processing Centre database (in Polish).
