= Janusz Kochanowski =

Polish lawyer and diplomat (1940–2010)

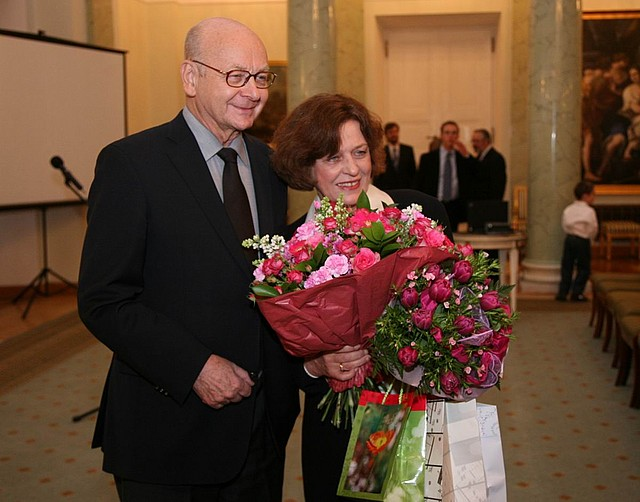
- Kochanowski with Ewa Junczyk-Ziomecka in 2010
- Born: 18 April 1940; Częstochowa, Poland
- Died: 10 April 2010 (aged 69); Smolensk, Russia
- Education: University of Warsaw
- Occupations: Lawyer, diplomat
- Spouse: Eva
- Children: 2

Janusz Bogumił Kochanowski (18 April 1940 – 10 April 2010) was a Polish lawyer and diplomat. He was the Commissioner for Civil Rights Protection of the Republic of Poland (Polish Ombudsman).

== Life and career ==
Janusz Kochanowski was born in Częstochowa in Poland on 18 April 1940. He was married to a Polish philologist, Ewa and had two children: Marta, a lawyer, and Mateusz, a law student.

He graduated from the Faculty of Law at the University of Warsaw and completed his court training in the Voivodeship Court in the capital city of Warsaw between 1964 and 1966. He wrote his doctoral thesis on "The Subjective Boundaries of Criminal Liability" and obtained his doctoral degree in 1980.

Kochanowski was a lecturer in the Faculty of Law at the University of Warsaw from 1966 to 1990 and from 1997 to 2005. He served as an expert for the Senate Commission for Human Rights and the Rule of Law from 1989 to 1991. Subsequently, he was the Consul-General for the Polish Republic in London from 1991 to 1995. Between 1996 and 1997, he was a visiting fellow at the Cambridge University.

From 1995, Kochanowski was a member of the District Council of Legal Advisers in Warsaw and, from 1980 to 1991, he was a member of the independent self-governing trade union Solidarity. Between 1989 and 2003, he was a founder member, secretary and honorary member of the Rotary Club of Warsaw. Furthermore, he was a member of the following institutions: The London Diplomatic Association from 1991 to 1995; The Consular Corps in London from 1991 to 1995; The London European Society and European Luncheon Club from 1993 to 1997; The European Atlantic Group in London from 1993 to 1997; The Polish "Ognisko" ["Hearth"] Club in London from 1991 to 1995; The Oxford and Cambridge University Club in London from 1997 to 1999; The British-Polish Legal Association in London, of which he is an honorary life member; Transparency International, for whom he was a board member; The Polish Council of the European Movement. He was also a founder-member of the Association for National Remembrance, a member of the International Adviser Journal of Criminal Law and Philosophy and a member of the European advisory committee for Caselex.

In 1998, Kochanowski became a member of the team formed to assess the creation of a Civil Service in Poland and was the author of the report prepared at that time. In 2000–2001, he was a member of the team at the Ministry of Justice preparing an amendment of the Penal Code. From 2000 to 2006, he was the chairman of the "Ius et Lex" foundation, whose aim is to support scientific and educational initiatives concerning Polish law and to realise the guidelines of the state of law. Most recently the foundation prepared, under Kochanowski's leadership, a programme for the reform of the administration of justice. From 2003 to 2004, he was the founder and first chairman of the Agreement of the Self-government of the Legal Professions and Legal Organisations, whose aim is to unify the activities of the representatives of all legal professions in order to reform the administration of Polish justice, to repair the system of the binding law and to raise the professional and moral standards of the legal professions. In 2003-2005, he led a think-tank which was devoted to an analysis of the problems of the state and to the preparation of a reform programme and whose work would be summed up in a volume of cases entitled "Repairing the Republic".

He was listed on the flight manifest of the Tupolev Tu-154 of the 36th Special Aviation Regiment carrying the President of Poland Lech Kaczyński which crashed near Smolensk-North airport near Pechersk near Smolensk, Russia, on 10 April 2010, killing all aboard. Kochanowski's body was identified two days later.

== Academic publications and honours ==
Kochanowski was the editor-in-chief of the "Ius et Lex" magazine and the instigator and editor of a series of classics on the philosophy of law, which includes such books as: Etyka i Rządy Prawa ["Ethics and the Rule of Law"] by David Lyons; Autorytet prawa ["The Authority of Law"] by Joseph Raz; Prawo naturalne i uprawnienia naturalne ["Natural Law and Natural Rights"] by John Finnis and Moralność prawa ["The Morality of Law"] by Lon L. Fuller. All of these books were designed to effect changes in the understanding and application of the law in Poland. He was also the editor of a special edition published this year in the United States of America by American Behavioral Scientist and entitled "International Terrorism Through Polish Eyes".

During his academic career, Kochanowski was several times visiting fellow at the Max-Planck-Institute für Ausländisches und Internationales Strafrecht in Freiburg, the University of Augsburg, Jesus College at the University of Oxford, numerous colleges at the University of Cambridge, including Wolfson College, Robinson College, where he became elected senior member, Clare Hall, where he became a life member, and Peterhouse. In 2001, he was invited to be a visiting fellow at the British Academy.

Kochanowski was the author of over 100 works on penal, administrative and constitutional law as well as international relations. These include three monographs: Subiektywne granice sprawstwa i odpowiedzialności karnej ["The Subjective Boundaries of Perpetration and Penal Liability"] (1985), Zagadnienia odpowiedzialności za przestępstwa drogowe i przeciwko bezpieczeństwu w komunikacji ["Questions of Liability for Road Traffic Offences and Offences against Safety in Communications"] (1990); Redukcja odpowiedzialności karnej ["The Reduction of Penal Liability"] (2000). He is the author or co-author of several commentaries, including Przestępstwa i wykroczenia drogowego ["Road Traffic Offences and Misdemeanours"] (1991) and the established classic commentaries to the Highway Code.

Many of these works were published in German and English, including Über die Wandlung der strafrechtlichen Verantwortung und die sich verringernde Rolle dieser Verantwortung im gesellschaftlichen Leben "Zeitschrift für Rechtsvergleichung" (1978), Zur Problematik der Verkündung von Strafgesetzen in Polen, "Jahrbuch für Ostrecht" (1986), "Reasonable Man" Standards in Continental Law, ("The Journal of Legislative Studies" 1995), Penal Law in Confrontation with the Nightmares of the Past and Challenges of the Present Day (Penal law in relation to the change in the political system in Poland between 1990 and 2000). ("Managerial Law" Volume 44 Number 5, 2002).

Kochanowski was the author of several works for the Polish Parliament and Government, including: Projekt ustawy o służbie zagranicznej ["A Bill Concerning the Foreign Services"] (1998), commissioned by the Ministry for Foreign Affairs; Raport o tworzeniu służby cywilnej w latach 1996 - 97 ["A Report about the Creation of a Civil Service 1996-1997"], prepared within the framework of a commission formed by the Prime Minister; Analizy i oceny kodeksu karnego z 1997 na tle innych polskich kodyfikacji karnych ["Analyses and Assessments of the 1997 Penal Code against the Background of Other Polish Penal Codifications"] (1999), commissioned by the Polish Parliament's Bureau for Studies and Expert Appraisements, as well as many other export appraisements for the Parliament.

On 16 April 2010, Kochanowski was posthumously awarded the Commander's Cross with Star of the Order of Polonia Restituta and on 20 April he was buried with full military honours in the family grave at the cemetery in Częstochowa.

Political offices
Preceded by Andrzej Zoll	Polish Ombudsman; 2006–2010	Succeeded by Irena Lipowicz
