= Adam Zieliński =

Polish politician (1931–2022)

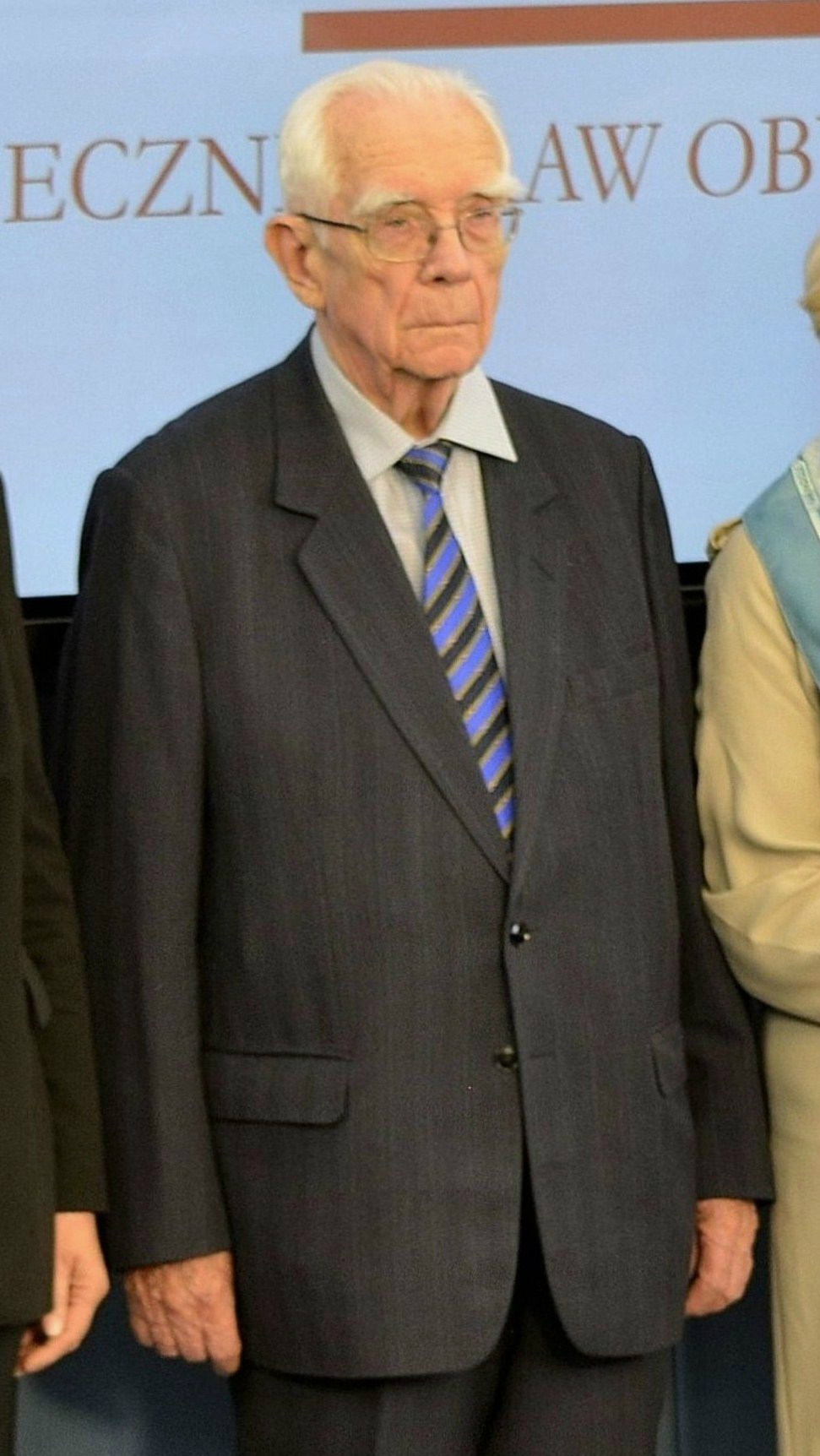
- Zieliński in 2015

3rd Polish Ombudsman
- In office 8 May 1996 – 30 June 2000
- Preceded by: Tadeusz Zieliński
- Succeeded by: Andrzej Zoll

Member of the Sejm
- In office 18 June 1989 – 25 November 1991

President of the Supreme Administrative Court of Poland
- In office 1982–1992
- Preceded by: Sylwester Zawadzki
- Succeeded by: Roman Hauser

Personal details
- Born: Adam Stanisław Zieliński; 28 June 1931 Pruszków, Poland
- Died: 14 November 2022 (aged 91)
- Party: PZPR
- Education: University of Warsaw
- Occupation: Lawyer

Adam Stanisław Zieliński (28 June 1931 – 14 November 2022) was a Polish lawyer and politician. A member of the Polish United Workers' Party, he served as president of the Supreme Administrative Court of Poland from 1982 to 1992, a member of the Sejm from 1989 to 1991, and Polish Ombudsman from 1996 to 2000.

Zieliński died on 14 November 2022, at the age of 91.
