= Paweł Kasprzak =

Polish political and human rights activist

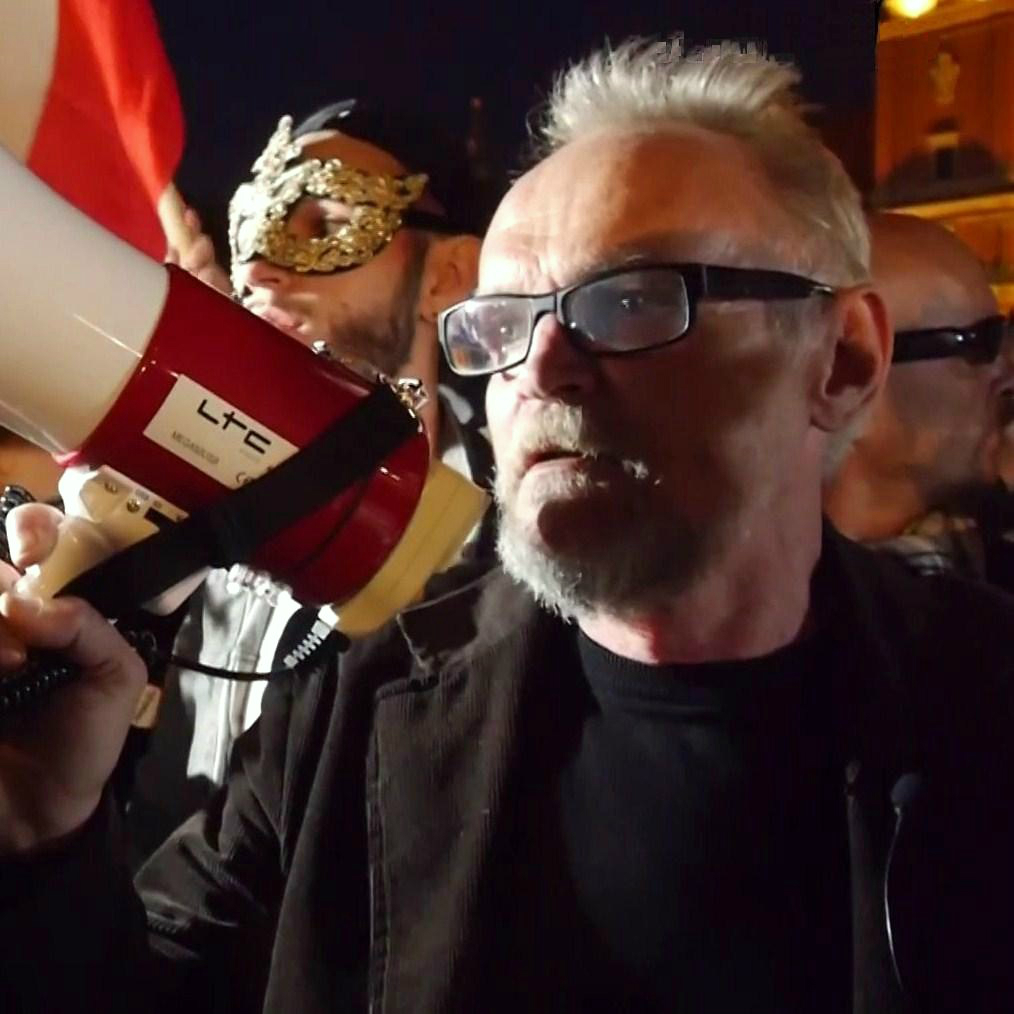
Paweł Kasprzak

Cezary Paweł Kasprzak (born 26 March 1961 in Wrocław) is a Polish political and human rights activist, one of the leaders of the Obywatele RP movement, and a television producer. He was an activist in the Independent Students' Union, Orange Alternative and Solidarity trade union, and a close collaborator of Władysław Frasyniuk. He is a founding member of the Consultative Council of Poland created during the October 2020 Polish protests. He is an author of numerous press publications.
