= Polish Socialist Party – Freedom, Equality, Independence (Third Republic) =

Polish political party

Polish Socialist Party – Freedom, Equality, Independence Polska Partia Socjalistyczna – Wolność, Równość, Niepodległość
- Abbreviation: PPS-WRN
- General Secretary: Władysław Panek
- Founded: 1 May 1990
- Split from: Polish Socialist Party
- Newspaper: Naprzód Robotniczy
- Ideology: Socialism

The Polish Socialist Party – Freedom, Equality, Independence (Polish: Polska Partia Socjalistyczna – Wolność, Równość, Niepodległość, PPS WRN) was a Polish socialist party created on 1 May 1990 by activists of the émigré branch of the Polish Socialist Party, which refused to agree to unification with the National PPS (among others Janusz Zawadzki from Great Britain, Piotr Droździk from France). A year later, a PPS WRN wing in Poland was established, created by activists like Michał Tabaczar from Warsaw, or a Kraków group concentrated around the newspaper Naprzód (Leszek Florczyk). The parties merged on 2 July 1993, with Władysław Panek becoming the General Secretary of PPS WRN. The party had Districted Workers' Committees in Warsaw and Kraków and had a newspaper, Naprzód Robotniczy. In the spring of 1994, the party was reinforced by a group of secessionists from the PPS, opposed to a merger with the group led by Edward Osóbka-Morawski (for example vicechair of the CKW Bronisław Jędrzejowski). In the 1995 presidential election, it endorsed Tadeusz Zieliński.
