= Commissioner for Human Rights (Poland) =

Ombudsman of Poland

- Rzecznik Praw Obywatelskich (Polish)
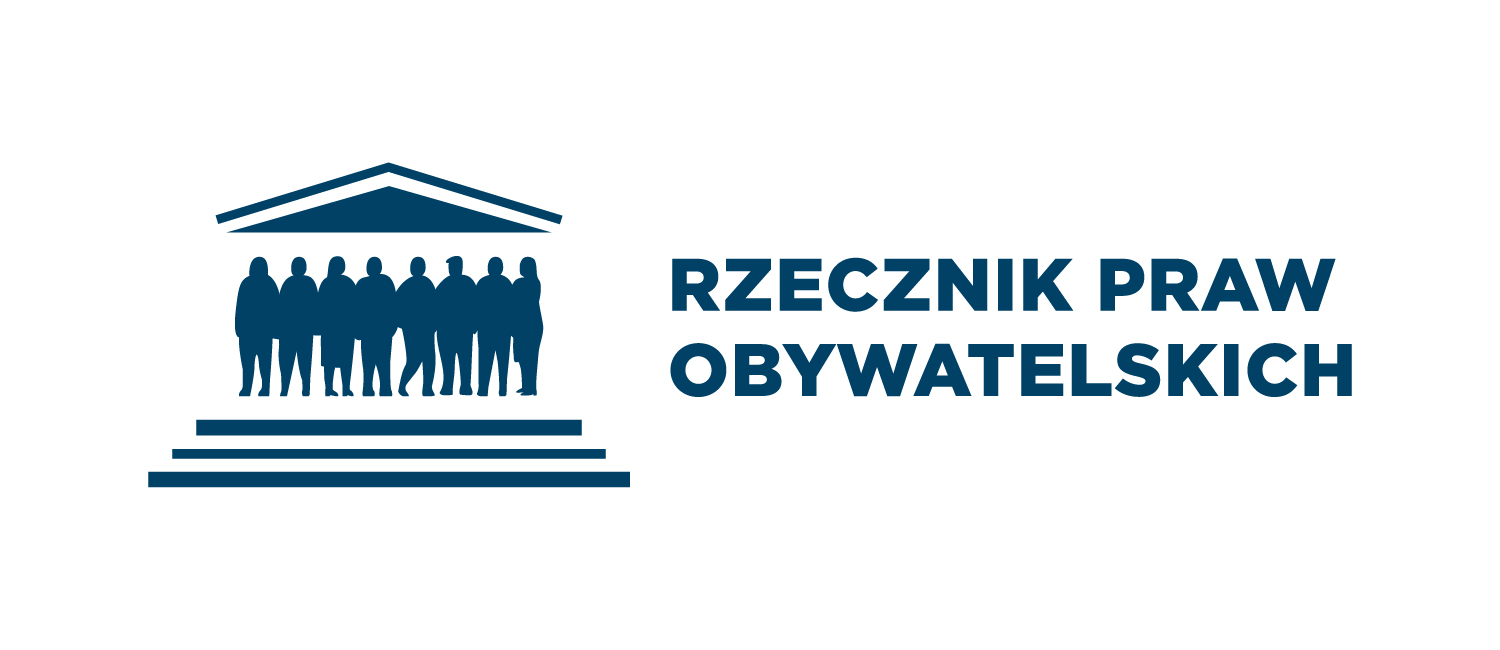

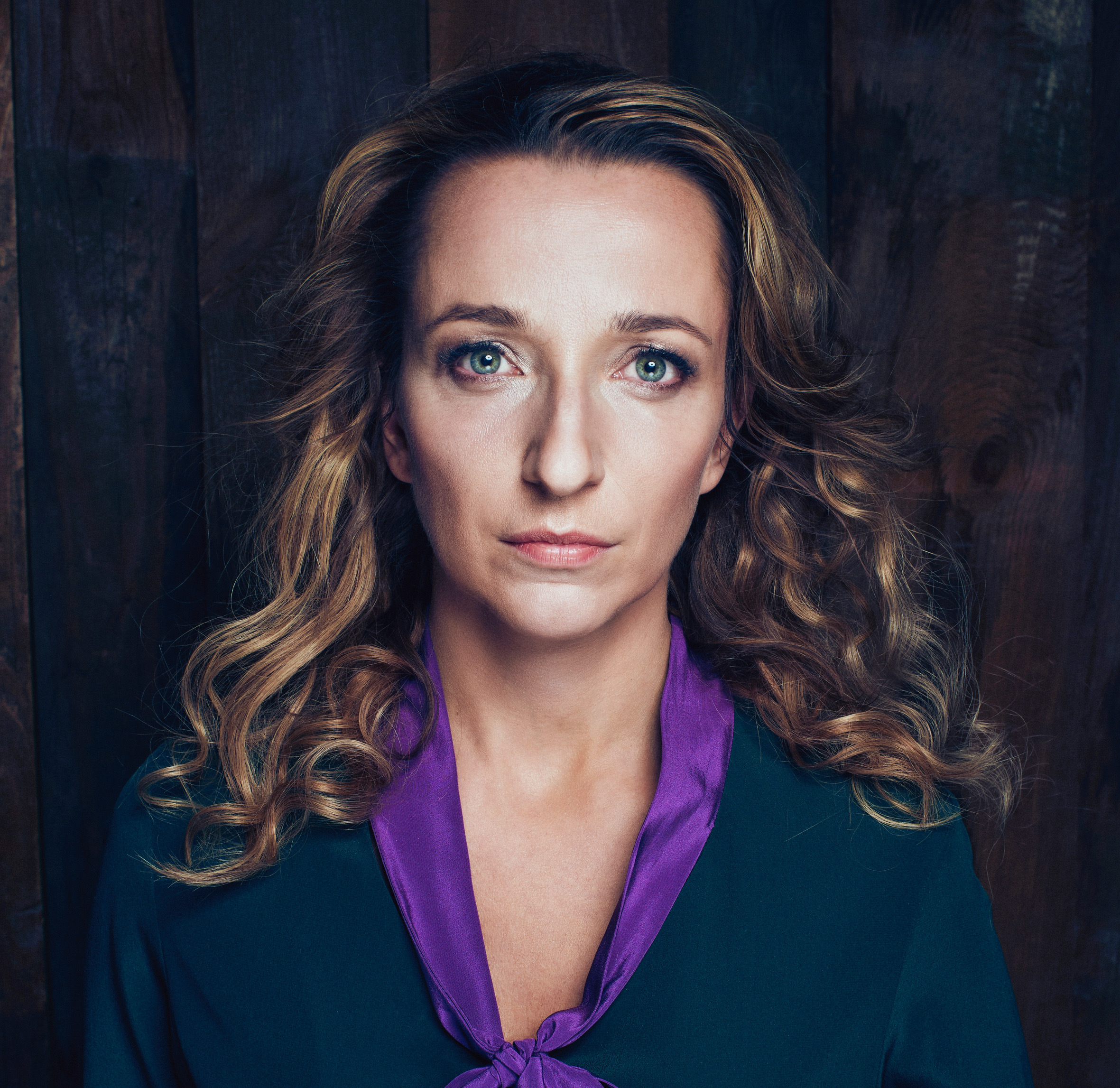
- Incumbent; Sylwia Gregorczyk-Abram since 23 July 2026
- Abbreviation: RPO
- Member of: GANHRI (A status)
- Reports to: Sejm
- Appointer: Sejm (with Senate's approval)
- Term length: Five years
- Constituting instrument: Act on Commissioner for Human Rights (1987); Constitution of Poland (1997)
- Formation: 15 July 1987
- First holder: Ewa Łętowska
- Unofficial names: Polish Ombudsman
- Deputy: Stanisław Trociuk; Wojciech Brzozowski; Adam Krzywoń
- Website: bip.brpo.gov.pl/en

The Commissioner for Human Rights (Polish: Rzecznik Praw Obywatelskich, RPO) (Note: lit. 'Ombudsman for Civil Rights'. Also referred to in English as the 'Commissioner for Citizens' Rights' or simply 'Polish Ombudsman'.) is a Polish ombudsman, an official appointed for a five-year term by the Sejm with the approval of the Senate (respectively lower and upper houses of the Polish legislature). The commissioner's responsibility is to protect civil and human rights implied by the Constitution of Poland and other legislative acts.

The office was established by an act of parliament in 1987 and became a constitutional body when the Constitution of Poland entered into force in 1997.

== Responsibilities and powers ==
Polish law entrusts the ombudsman with four responsibilities with respect to citizen rights:

- prevention
- diagnosis
- monitoring
- creativity

The ombudsman, deputies and the office protect the freedom and rights of the people. They monitor current events. In case they find that due to intentional actions (or lack thereof) by agencies, organizations or institutions which are duty bound to respect freedoms and rights of the people, these freedoms and rights were violated, they undertake action. In such cases, they can act on behalf of the people in courts. The office can undertake such actions only if a thorough analysis of the situation shows that the rights or the freedoms of the people were infringed, and only if such analysis recognizes the need for the ombudsman to be involved in a case. The people have the right to ask the ombudsman for intervention.

== Appointment and recall ==
- The ombudsman is elected by an act of Sejm and has to be accepted by the Senate.
- The term of office is five years long and the same person cannot hold the office more than twice.
- Sejm has the right to recall the ombudsman with a 3/5 majority before the end of term.

=== The ombudsman election and status conflict 2020-2021 ===
In September 2020, the term of office of the incumbent ombudsman (Adam Bodnar) was supposed to expire, but the Sejm and the Senate had not agreed on a successor. This was an unforeseen complication. The Polish law did not provide for an interim office in case the term. The incumbent Ombudsman thus remained in office, awaiting the appointment of a new one.

However, for five months, the two parliament chambers did not succeed to agree on a successor, in spite of several tries. Twice the Sejm (where the parties in government were in majority) voted down the opposition candidate, the lawyer Zuzanna Rudzińska-Bluszcz. Once the Sejm appointed the government's candidate, Deputy Foreign Minister Piotr Wawrzyk, who however was not confirmed by the Senate (where the opposition parties were in majority).

On 15 April 2021 the Polish Constitutional Tribunal which has been controlled by the governing Law and Justice party almost since it took power in 2015, decided that Bodnar could stay in office as a temporary Ombudsman until a new one was elected, but only for a short time, and that he anyhow must vacate the office after at most three further months. The same day, the Sejm appointed government candidate Bartłomiej Wróblewski as new ombudsman, to be considered for approval by the Senate (with 240 MPs voting "for", 201 "against", and 11 abstaining).

== List of officeholders ==
No.	Portrait	Name	From	To
1		Ewa Łętowska	1 January 1988	13 February 1992
2		Tadeusz Zieliński	13 February 1992	8 May 1996
3		Adam Zieliński	8 May 1996	30 June 2000
4		Andrzej Zoll	30 June 2000	15 February 2006
5		Janusz Kochanowski	15 February 2006	10 April 2010
6		Irena Lipowicz	21 July 2010	9 September 2015
7		Adam Bodnar	9 September 2015	15 July 2021
—		Stanisław Trociuk; Acting	16 July 2021	23 July 2021
8		Marcin Wiącek	23 July 2021	23 July 2026
9		Sylwia Gregorczyk-Abram	23 July 2026	Incumbent

In July 2026, Sejm appointed Sylwia Gregorczyk-Abram a Commissioner for Human Rights.
