= Kazimierz Buchała =

Polish jurist (1924–2002)

- Born: 6 February 1924; Gierałtowice
- Died: 7 September 2002 (aged 78)
- Occupation: Jurist

Academic background
- Education: Jagiellonian University

Kazimierz Buchała (6 February 1924 – 7 September 2002) was a jurist, member of the Constitutional Tribunal from 1985 to 1989.

== Biography ==
He was born into a peasant family, the son of Jan and Zofia. In 1946 he joined Związek Młodzieży Wiejskiej „Wici”. From 1948 to 1950 he was a member of the District Board of the Association of Academic Polish Youth in Kraków. From 1949 to 1953 he was a member of the United People's Party.

In 1950 he graduated in law from the Jagiellonian University. In 1953 he joined Polish United Workers' Party. He ran a law practice; from 1953 to 1958 he was dean of the Bar Council in Kraków. He obtained doctorate in law from the Jagiellonian University in 1959. In 1964 he obtained habilitation. From 1977 until 1981 he was First Secretary of the University Committee of the Polish United Workers' Party at the Jagiellonian University.

His doctoral students included Piotr Wiatrowski.

== Works ==
- Wina przy przestępstwach sprowadzenia powszechnego niebezpieczeństwa. Dyrektywy sądowego wymiaru kary. 1964.
- Wykład prawa karnego, nauka o karze. 1972.
- Przestępstwa przeciw bezpieczeństwu w komunikacji drogowej. 1973.
- Prawo karne materialne. 1980. Second edition: 1989.
- Polskie prawo karne. 1995. Co-authored with Andrzej Zoll.

== Accolades ==
- Medal of the 10th Anniversary of People's Poland (1955)

== Bibliography ==
- Kto jest kim w Polsce 1984. Warszawa: Wydawnictwo Interpress. 1984. p. 98. ISBN 83-223-2073-6.
- Kto jest kim w Polsce. Informator biograficzny. Warszawa. 1989. p. 136.
- Zoll, Andrzej (2003). "Kazimierz Buchała (1924–2002)". Państwo i Prawo (3): 104–107.
- Żukowski, Przemysław (2018). "Buchała Kazimierz (1924–2002)". In Adam Redzik (ed.). Słownik Biograficzny Adwokatów Polskich. Vol. 3. Warszawa: Naczelna Rada Adwokacka, Redakcja "Palestry". pp. 38–40. ISBN 978-83-934-796-2-7.
