= Sylwia Gregorczyk-Abram =

Polish lawyer and activist (born 1982)

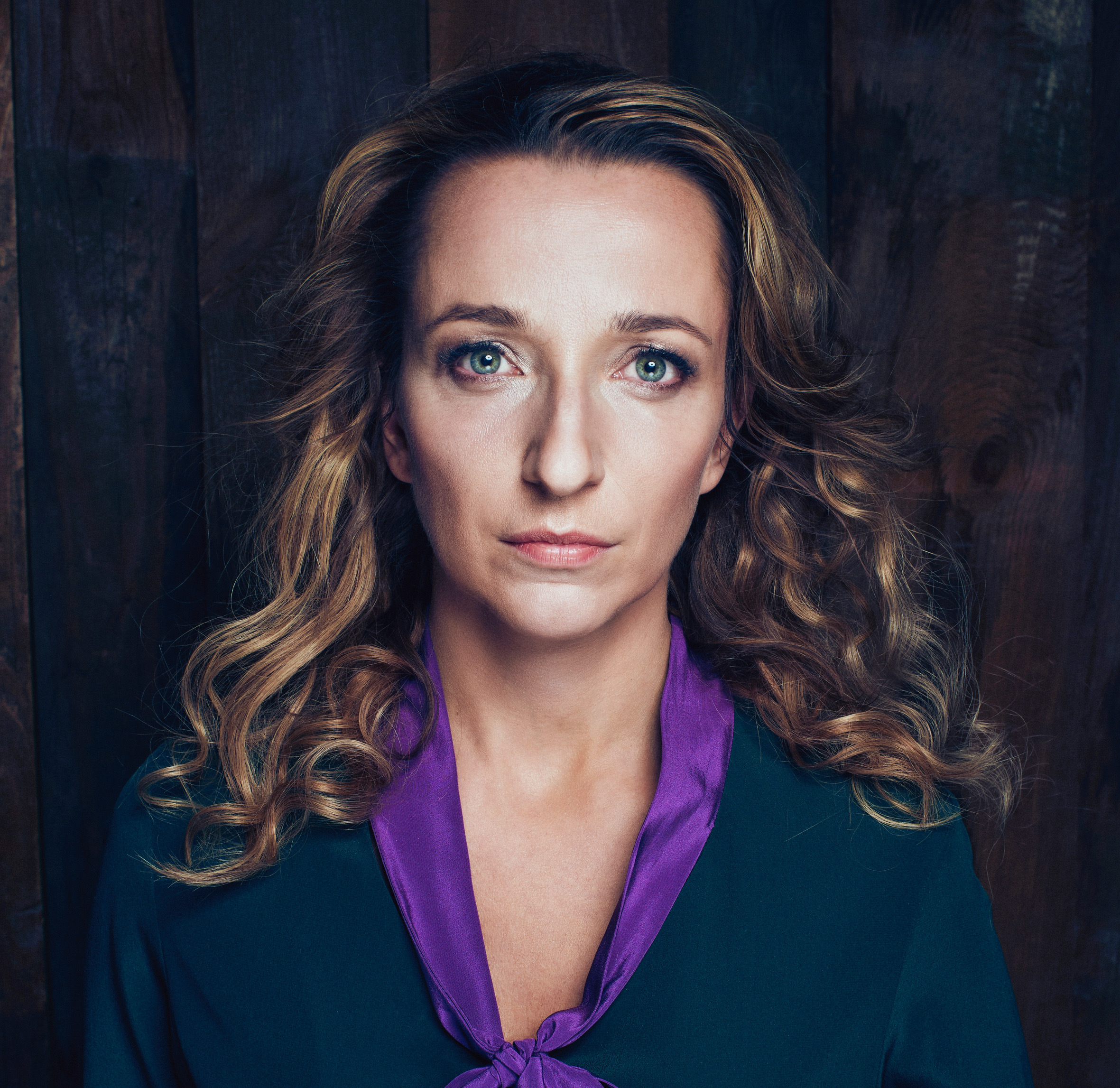
- Sylwia Gregorczyk-Abram in 2020
- Born: 19 November 1982 (age 43); Poland
- Education: University of Warsaw
- Occupations: attorney, social activist
- Employer: Clifford Chance
- Known for: Wolne Sądy
- Spouse: Grzegorz Abram

Sylwia Marta Gregorczyk-Abram (born 19 November 1982) is a Polish attorney and social activist.

== Education and legal career ==
Graduate of the Faculty of Law and Administration at the University of Warsaw (2006), she completed a postgraduate degree in medical law, bioethics, and sociology. In 2010 she was admitted to the Warsaw Bar as an advocate.

Since 2006 professionally affiliated with Clifford Chance law office in Warsaw, where she is responsible for pro bono legal practice. She specialises in legal proceedings as well as civil and criminal law. In April 2016 she became a proxy for cooperation with non-governmental organisations at the Warsaw Bar Association. In recognition of her legal and public activity, in 2021 she was chosen Maurice R. Greenberg World Fellow at Yale University.

Throughout her career, Gregorczyk-Abram has provided pro bono legal advice to non-governmental organisations which promote the rule of law and advocate for a systemic reform of the Poland's judiciary, including the Helsinki Foundation for Human Rights, Habitat for Humanity Poland and Court Watch Poland Foundation. She is a member of the board of Zbigniew Holda Association, where she ran "Constitutional Week" – a nationwide initiative of lawyers who give lessons about the Polish Constitution in primary and secondary schools.

== Public activity ==
In 2017, amid a series of public protests against the judiciary reforms introduced by the Law and Justice (PiS) government, along with Maria Ejchart-Dubois, Paulina Kieszkowska-Knapik and Michał Wawrykiewicz, she co-founded the Free Courts Civic Initiative (Inicjatywa Obywatelska Wolne Sądy). In December 2019, the group organised a series of public protests against the proposed legislation that allowed the newly formed Disciplinary Chamber of the Supreme Court of Poland to punish judges who engage in what the government deemed "political activity". In 2018, she was among co-founders of the Komitet Obrony Sprawiedliwości (KOS, Justice Defence Committee).

In 2019, Gregorczyk-Abram successfully represented LGBT+ groups on a pro bono basis in their legal motion against a pro-government conservative Polish newspaper Gazeta Polska which resulted in the court's decision to halt the distribution of controversial LGBT-free zone stickers. She was a representative of judges appealing to the Court of Justice of the European Union in joint case C-585/18, C-624/18iC-625/18A.K, concerning the independence of the Disciplinary Chamber of the Polish Supreme Court as well as in the case C-487/19 of a Polish judge Waldemar Żurek questioning his transfer to another court, which both ended with a ruling undermining the legality of the reforms introduced by the Polish government.

In July 2026, Sejm appointed her as Commissioner for Human Rights.

== Awards and achievements ==
- 2016 – "Pro Bono Lawyer of the Year" prize by the Polish daily Rzeczpospolita
- 2016 – "Rising Stars – Prawnicy liderzy jutra 2016", organised by Wolters Kluwer and Dziennik Gazeta Prawna
- 2019 – "Złoty Paragraf" in the category of best advocates, awarded by Dziennik Gazeta Prawna
- 2020 – European Citizens’ Prize (as a member of the Wolne Sądy)
