= State Liability and the Law =

2023 book by Bartłomiej Wróblewski

State Liability and the Law: A Historical and Comparative Analysis
- Cover of the English edition (2023)
- Author: Bartłomiej Wróblewski
- Original title: Odpowiedzialność odszkodowawcza państwa za działania ustawodawcy. Kształtowanie się koncepcji i instytucji na tle reguł ogólnych odpowiedzialności państwa
- Translator: Gwidon Naskrent, revised by Stephen Dersley
- Language: English
- Series: Routledge Studies in Comparative Legal History
- Subject: State liability, comparative legal history
- Publisher: Routledge
- Publication date: 2023
- Publication place: London, New York
- Media type: Print, digital
- Pages: 250
- ISBN: 978-1-032-35487-3
- Preceded by: Die Staatshaftung für legislatives Unrecht in Deutschland (2005), Pozaumowna odpowiedzialność odszkodowawcza Wspólnoty Europejskiej za akty normatywne (2005)

State Liability and the Law: A Historical and Comparative Analysis is a 2023 book by the Polish legal scholar, constitutionalist, and politician Bartłomiej Wróblewski, published by Routledge as the second title in the Routledge Studies in Comparative Legal History series. Gwidon Naskrent translated it from Wróblewski's 2011 Polish monograph. The book covers German, French, and English law from middle ages to the mid-twentieth century, and the more Greek and Roman, European legal thought (ius commune, the natural law school). It asks how those systems came to hold, or to deny, that the state must answer for the acts of public authorities, and in particular for the acts of the legislature. Contrary to the prevailing view according to which state liability originated in the late 19th century only, Wróblewski discovered traces of it in almost every period and thus rejects the dogma of the absence of liability for legislative acts in previous times.

== Summary ==
Wróblewski questions the view that state liability is a product of the second half of the nineteenth century and the view that it developed in a linear, progressive way from complete immunity to full realisation, both of which he finds repeated in the scholarly literature.

As one of the number of boundaries put upon state action, liability is treated here in a very broad sense. Not only is a state’s duty to make amends for unlawful and tortious acts by itself a well-known limit upon government action, but also a state’s liability to compensate owners for loss caused by all sorts of interference, whether or not unlawful, with their property is another well-known limit upon such action. Here as elsewhere, instead of the usual three categories of fault, risk and equity, therefore the main division is between liability for acts of public authority which are lawful and liability for acts which are, or have become, unlawful. The relationship between higher law, whether natural or constitutional, and liability above all the ordinary rules of law is also studied here. Three systems of liability, namely Germany, France and England, are studied here in three equal parts, i.e., through the relevant legislation, through the relevant decisions, and through the relevant academic literature. Needless to say, the author’s native land, Poland, is not treated here as one of the systems of liability. But much use is made of all relevant publications by Polish authors on the matter here discussed.

Cover of the original Polish edition (2011)

In Part I, Wróblewski returns to ancient Greece and Rome where compensation for interference with property was already paid. He then turns to the medieval ius commune and its doctrine of acquired rights of individuals, which were not to be disturbed by public authorities and their employees unless just cause existed and fair compensation was paid. He continues by a survey of the development of communal liability in German law, of the English petition of right and of the views of natural-law writers on this subject. The major part of this Part I, however, is devoted to the great Hugo Grotius and to his account of dominium eminens in terms of just satisfaction from the common stock for any taking which was lawful. In the era of early modern times this whole pattern of rules concerning interference with property by public authorities was slowly reversed. Already in the 17th century the theory of mandate was worked out in detail. Long after that the infamous maxim "the king can do no wrong" ceased to mean that the king may not do wrong and was turned into a basis of immunity of the State and its officials.

In the second part of his book Wróblewski sketches the creation of the modern legal systems of liability between late 18th and mid-20th century. In Prussia acquired rights of citizens were first codified in 75 § General State Laws of 1794 of Prussia. The autonomous public law liability to be judged by the Conseil d'État was created by the so-called decision Blanco of 1873 in France. Art. 131 of the Weimar Constitution of 1919 already stipulated that the German state was accountable for the unlawful actions of state officials by virtue of constitutional law. The change in England came by means of an Act of Parliament (the Crown Proceedings Act of 1947) which subjected the Crown to the same rules of liability as any other tortfeasor.

In the third and longest part of his book, Wróblewski deals with the liability of the state for its legislative actions. In this field of public law higher law (natural law and constitutional law) is of the greatest relevance, since a statute can be contrary to law only by reference to a higher standard. Wróblewski treats first the liability of Prussia for legislative violations of acquired rights. He notes that in the course of the 19th century a restriction of the far reaching liability established in the General State Laws of 1794, section 75 was brought about, above all by a royal cabinet order of 1831.

While the compensation was to be distributed equally among all taxpayers, the restrictive interpretation given to this principle by the Conseil d’Etat in the La Fleurette decision of 1938 resulted in only three cases subsequently being successful in their claims for compensation against the state.

The decision based compensation on the equal apportionment of public burdens without impugning the lawfulness of the statute, but the court applied the principle so restrictively that only three cases succeeded over the following decades. Of England he writes that the absolute sovereignty of Parliament "had to nip any discussions of such liability in the bud". He finds that "in all eras of history and almost all analysed legal systems one can discover at least some vestiges of state liability". He attributes the narrow scope of state liability to a practical fear of overburdening the public purse rather than to any legal principle, and argues that the legislator's immunity was never settled dogma and that lawyers had been asking since the Middle Ages whether it held.
