= Citizens of Poland =

Informal civic movement

Citizens of Poland, Obywatele RP
- Abbreviation: ORP
- Formation: 2016
- Legal status: Informal
- Headquarters: Warsaw (Poland)
- Region served: Country-wide
- Website: obywatelerp.org

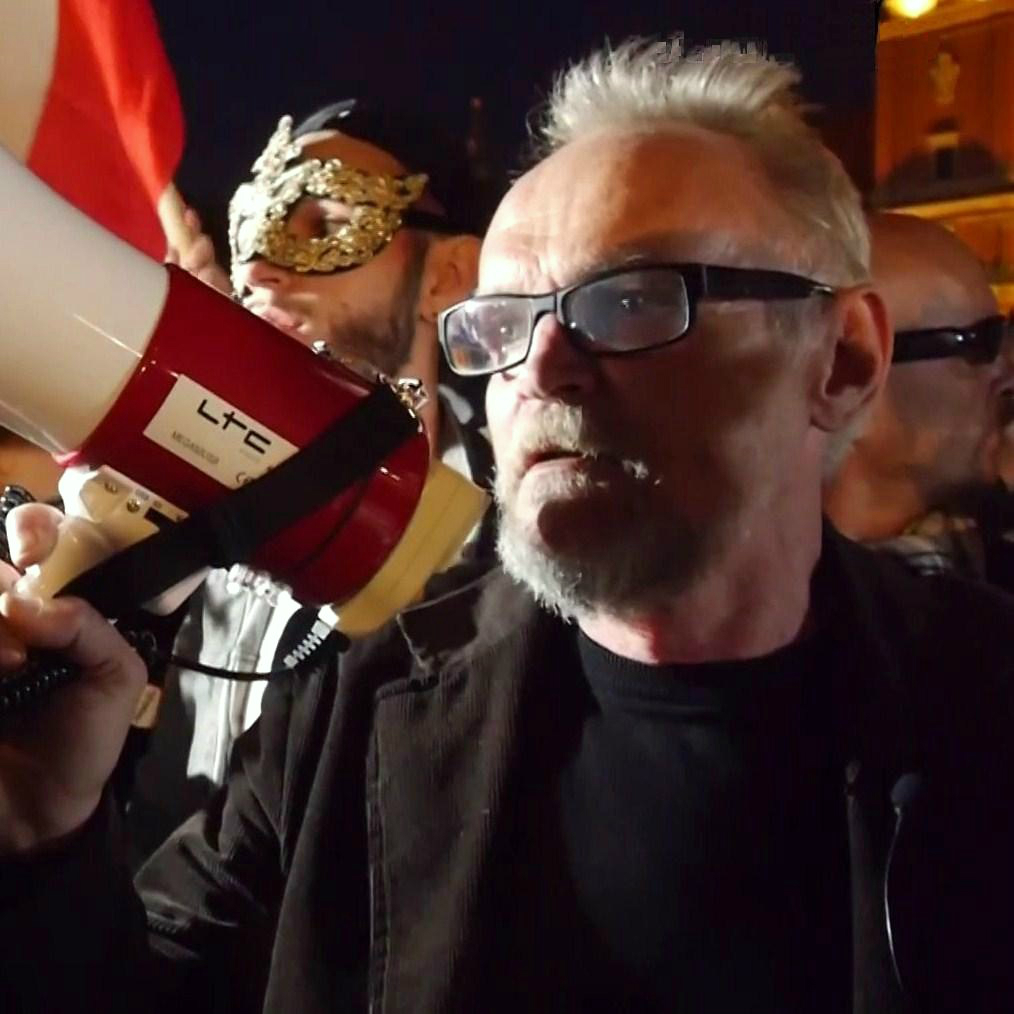
Paweł Kasprzak – one of the leaders of Citizens of Poland during a demonstration.

The Citizens of Poland (Polish: Obywatele RP, verbatim Citizens of the Republic of Poland, ORP) is an informal civic movement in Poland engaged in pro-democracy and anti-fascist activities, opposed to the actions of the government led by the Law and Justice (PiS) party. Citizens of Poland practice non-violent civil disobedience.

Citizens of Poland organize protests against monthly gatherings led by Jarosław Kaczyński, the leader of the Law and Justice party, ostensibly to commemorate the victims of the Smoleńsk airplane catastrophe, protesting against the claim it was a political assassination promoted during these meetings. During one of their demonstrations a Solidarity-era hero Władysław Frasyniuk was accused of assaulting a policeman and later detained. ORP were actively engaged in protests against unconstitutional justice reforms in July 2017. They block far-right rallies and call for the dissolution of organisations promoting racism and xenophobia. In January 2018 the movement addressed the opposition parties in Poland demanding open primary elections before regional elections of 2018.

The movement established a network of support, ObyPomoc, for those prosecuted for pro-democracy or anti-fascist activities, arranging pro-bono legal aid. They collect and broadcast information on the police actions and cases against pro-democracy or anti-fascist activists.

== History of the movement ==
On 5 February 2016, in front of the Presidential Palace in Warsaw, 4 people–Tadeusz Jakrzewski, Paweł Kasprzak, Paweł Wrabec and Tobiasz Budzyński–accused Andrzej Duda, President of the Republic of Poland, of having violated the constitution. They did this by holding up banners containing the words: "We hereby announce that Andrzej Duda is a liar and perjurer". They criticized the pardon granted by the President to Mariusz Kamiński, they appealed to the President to take "oaths from lawfully elected judges of the Constitutional Tribunal". Prior to this, they sent a letter entitled "We renounce obedience to a power which violates the Constitution of the Republic of Poland".

The first counter-monthly demonstration of Obywatele RP was held on 10 March 2016. At that time, this was in the form of pickets organised alongside the monthly celebrations.

On 10 March 2017, activists of the Obywatele RP Movement tried for the first time to block the Smolensk monthly. This was tied to the fact that the Polish Parliament (the Sejm) changed the Law on Assemblies, giving priority for reservation of a venue to cyclical events, such as the Smolensk monthlies. That is when 7 participants of the movement—Paweł Kasprzak, Tadeusz Jakrzewski, Paweł Wrabec, Wojciech Kinasiewicz, Monika Dąbrowska, Michał Korczak, Hanna Frem and Marek Madej-Sierski—sat on the street blocking the march.

On 10 June 2017, Władysław Frasyniuk sat down together with activists from Obywatele RP on the route of the so-called Smolensk monthly. There was pushing and shoving by the police and in the end, police officers carried the counter-demonstrators on to the side. W. Frasyniuk later said in the media that "the policeman was rather aggressive" and that citizens have the right to demonstrate.

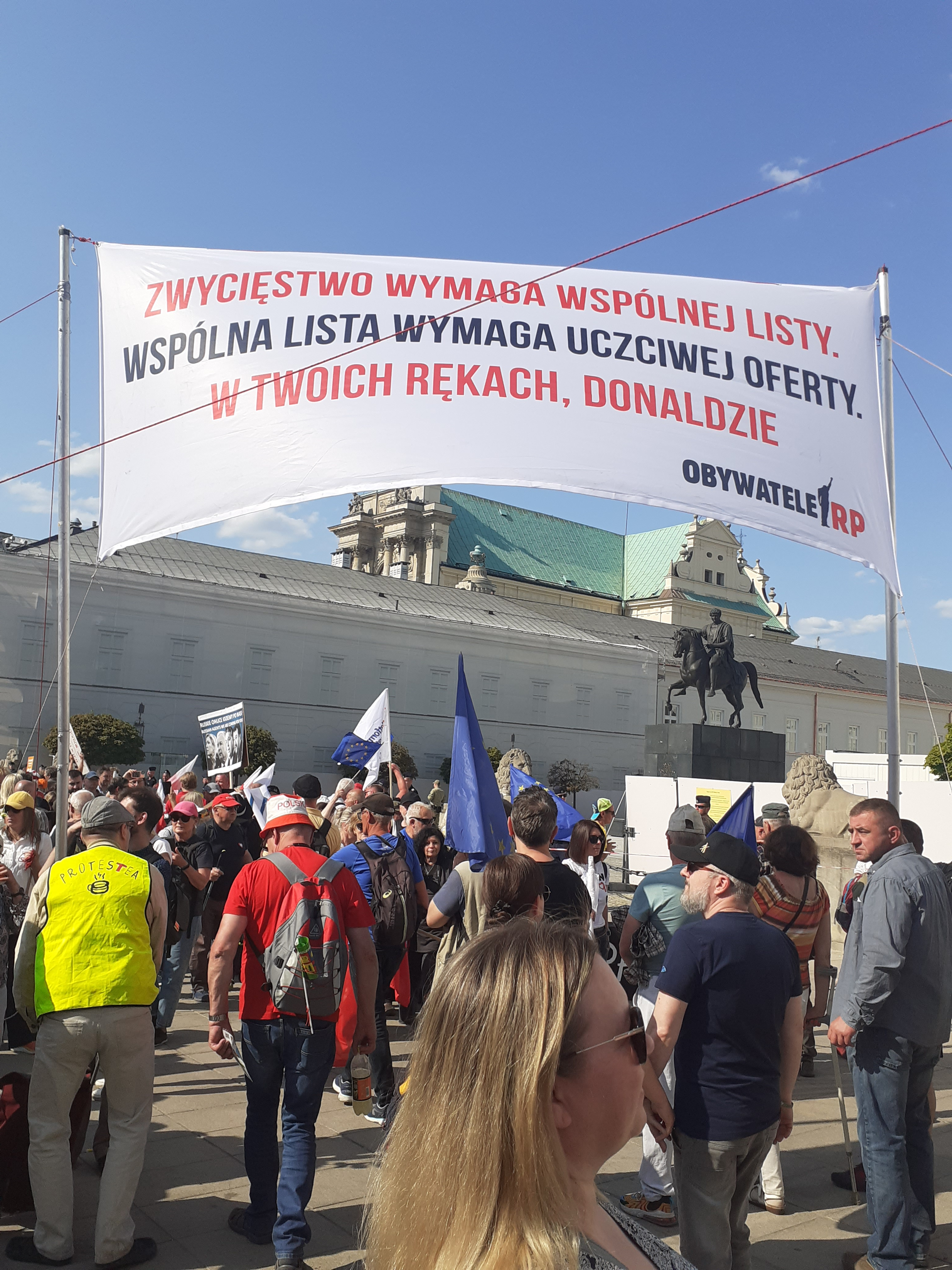
The banner of the Citizens of Poland carried during the opposition march on June 4, 2023.

The movement organises protests against organisations which propagate fascism and nationalism. On 26 February 2017, representatives of the movement, together with Antifa, protested against the march of the so-called Cursed soldiers, the participants of which held portraits of, among others, Romuald Rajs "Bury" who was responsible for committing murderous acts on the local civilian population.

During the pilgrimage of Polish football fans to the Jasna Góra Monastery on 13 January 2018, about a dozen people from the Obywatele RP movement and Demokratyczna RP (Democratic Republic of Poland), unfolded banners with inscriptions "Christianity is not hatred", "Humanity is my Country" and "Here are the borders of decency". They were attacked by the football fans on the pastures surrounding the monastery.

Obywatele RP together with Front Europejski (European Front) and Wolne Sądy (Free Courts) were architects of the "Europo, nie odpuszczaj" (Europe, don't give up) initiative, aimed at convincing the European Commission to take the Law on the Polish Supreme Court to the EU Court of Justice. The initiative involved demonstrations, petitions, and letters of support.

== Goals and tasks ==
The movement adopted peaceful civil disobedience as a method of its actions.

The movement runs a group called ObyPomoc (To Help)—people that provide legal support to the movement. ObyPomoc publishes periodical reports based on submitted information regarding court cases against the demonstrators.

On 19 November 2017, during the press conference organised by representatives of Obywatele RP, the Warsaw Women’s Strike, Citizens in Solidarity in Action and ODnowa, activists presented a report "on the actions of State forces against persons objecting against the unconstitutional acts of those in power, the logging of the Białowieża Forest and the fascism in public life in Poland". In their opinion, the police is using excessive force against civilian people for their participation in legal protests, and does not react, inter alia, during the "Independence March" to people carrying banners bearing radical slogans.

In January 2018, the movement approached the "coalition of democratic parties" demanding to hold "open primary local self-government elections": "We hear from some parties, social movements and media that »first, the PiS Party needs to be removed from power, and only after that, to deal with other matters«. We tell them today: we want democracy now! That is why we demand a coalition of »democratic« parties, and holding open primaries preceding the local self-government elections. Open, meaning such during which parties let the voters decide about the lists" – wrote P. Kasprzak in the Rzeczpospolita daily newspaper.

== Foundation Free Citizens of Poland ==
Obywatele RP are a movement without formal structures. There is a foundation Wolni Obywatele RP (Free Citizens of Poland) established by core members of the movement, tied with Obywatele RP and gathering funds for some of their actions. Poland's interior ministry has filed an application to court to replace the board of the foundation, accusing it of "inciting unlawful activity". The hearing is in September 2018.

== Participants ==
The informal leader of the Movement is Paweł Kasprzak. Other individuals connected with Obywatele RP are: Ukraine specialist Kinga Kamińska, journalists Piotr Pytlakowski and Wojciech Fusek.

== Awards ==
The organization was awarded the 2017 Zbigniew Hołda Award.

== See also ==
- Liberalism in Poland
