= Ewa Łętowska =

Polish lawyer

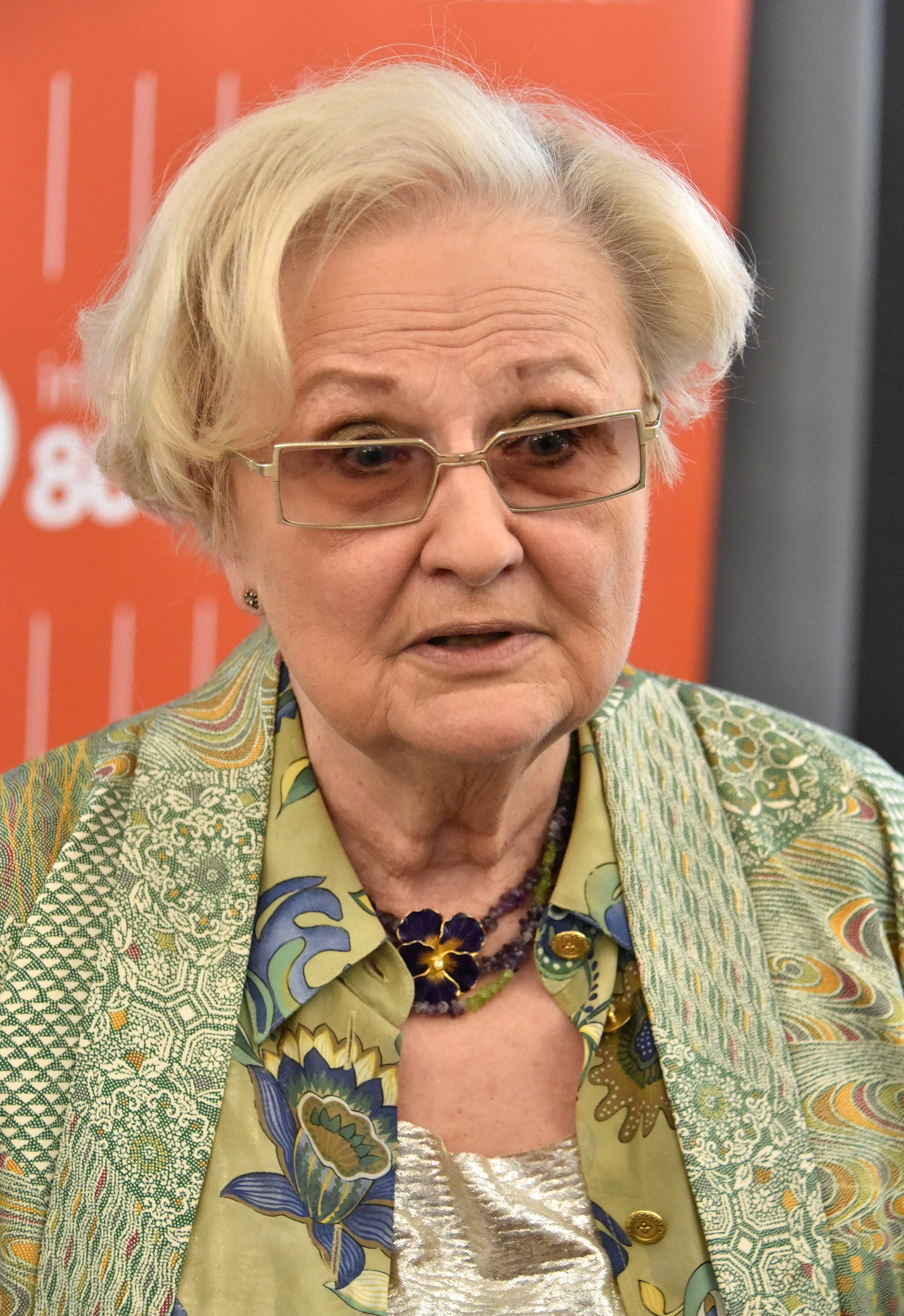

1st Ombudsman for Citizen Rights
- In office 1 January 1988 – 13 February 1992
- President: Wojciech Jaruzelski; Lech Wałęsa
- Prime Minister: Zbigniew Messner; Mieczysław Rakowski; Czesław Kiszczak; Tadeusz Mazowiecki; Jan Krzysztof Bielecki; Jan Olszewski
- Preceded by: Tadeusz Zieliński

Personal details
- Born: 22 March 1940 (age 86) Warsaw
- Education: University of Warsaw
- Profession: Lawyer
- Awards: Friedrich Ebert Foundation Human Rights Award (1994); Commander's Cross with Star of the Order of Polonia Restituta (2011)

Ewa Łętowska (pronounced: [ˈɛva wɛ̃ˈtɔfska]; born 22 March 1940 in Warsaw) is a Polish lawyer, a specialist in civil law and professor of legal science. Since 1985, she has worked at the Institute of Law of the Polish Academy of Sciences and since 1997, she has been a member of the Polish Academy of Arts and Sciences. In 1988, she became the first person to be appointed the Ombudsman for Citizen Rights in Poland. Between 1999 and 2002, she served as a judge at the Supreme Administrative Court of Poland and between 2002 and 2011 as a judge of the Polish Constitutional Tribunal.

== Life and career ==
She was born as Ewa Ołtarzewska on 22 March 1940 in Warsaw. In 1962, she graduated from the Faculty of Law and Administration of the University of Warsaw. In 1968, she obtained a doctoral degree and in 1975 a habilitation in civil law. In 1986, she was granted the title of professor of legal science. Between 1977 and 1987 she was head of the Department of Civil Law of the Institute of Law at the Polish Academy of Sciences.

After the introduction of the post of ombudsman for Citizen Rights in Poland she became the first person to hold this office, which she assumed on 1 January 1988 and left on 13 February 1992. Between 1999 and 2002, she served as a judge at the Supreme Administrative Court of Poland. In 2002 she was appointed a judge of the Polish Constitutional Tribunal after receiving endorsement from the Democratic Left Alliance (SLD), Polish People's Party (PSL) and Labour Union (UP).

She worked as professor at the Institute of Legal Science of the Polish Academy of Sciences and was a visiting professor at numerous universities including the University of Paris 1 Pantheon-Sorbonne. She has been a member of many organizations such as Collegium Invisibile, Helsinki Committee, Experts' Committee of the International Labour Organization, International Lawyers' Council Académie de Droit Comparé, Polish Academy of Arts and Sciences and Polish Academy of Sciences Committee.

== Selected honours and awards ==
- Friedrich Ebert Foundation Human Rights Award (1994)
- Commander's Cross of the Order of Polonia Restituta (1996)
- Tolerance Medal conferred by the Ecumenical Foundation (2000)
- Honorary doctorate from the University of Gdańsk (2008)
- Commander's Cross with Star of the Order of Polonia Restituta (2011)
- Special Award of the Polish Red Cross (2011)
- Barbara Skarga Prize awarded by the Leviathan Confederation (2013)
- Honorary doctorate from the University of Warsaw (2016)

== Selected publications ==
- Bezpodstawne wzbogacenie, C.H. Beck, Warsaw 2000.
- The commissioner for citizens' rights in Central and Eastern Europe: the Polish Experience, Saint Louis Univ. School of Law and Warsaw Univ. School of Law, Saint Louis 1996.
- La constitution, oeuvre de la société?, Schulthess Polygraphischer, Zurich 1995.
- Courts and tribunals under the constitution of Poland, Saint Louis Univ. School of Law and Warsaw Univ. School of Law, Saint Louis 1997.
- Europejskie prawo umów konsumenckich, C.H. Beck, Warsaw 2004.
- Jak zaczynał Rzecznik Praw Obywatelskich [columns 1988–1991], Agencja Master, Łódź 1992.
- Komentarz do ogólnych warunków umów konsumenckich (co-written with Czesława Żuławska), Wydawnictwo Prawnicze, Warsaw 1986.
- Nieuczciwe klauzule w prawie umów konsumenckich (co-editor), C.H. Beck, Warsaw 2004.
- Ochrona niektórych praw konsumentów: komentarz, C.H. Beck, Warsaw 2001.
- Po co ludziom konstytucja, Exit, Warsaw 1994.
- Podstawy prawa cywilnego, Ecostar, Warsaw 1993.
- Poradnik konsumenta (co-written with Krystyna Wójcik), Instytut Wydawniczy Związków Zawodowych, Warsaw 1983.
- Prawo umów konsumenckich, C.H. Beck, Warsaw 1999.
- Prawo zobowiązań – część ogólna (editor), C.H. Beck, Warsaw 1999.
- Sąd Najwyższy USA. Prawa i wolności obywatelskie (co-written with Roger Goldman and Stanisław Frankowski), Biuro Instytucji Demokratycznych i Praw Człowieka OBWE, Warsaw 1997.
- Umowa o świadczenie przez osobę trzecią, Wydawnictwo Prawnicze, Warsaw 1970.
- Umowy odnoszące się do osób trzecich, C.H. Beck, Warsaw 2006.
- Ustawa o ochronie niektórych praw konsumentów: komentarz, C.H. Beck, Warsaw 2000.
- Wzorce umowne: ogólne warunki, wzory, regulaminy, Zakład Narodowy im. Ossolińskich, Wrocław 1975.
- Zbieg norm w prawie cywilnym, C.H. Beck, Warsaw 2002.

== See also ==
- Human rights in Poland
- Politics of Poland
- List of Poles
