= Piotr Pytlakowski =

Polish journalist and screenwriter (1951–2024)

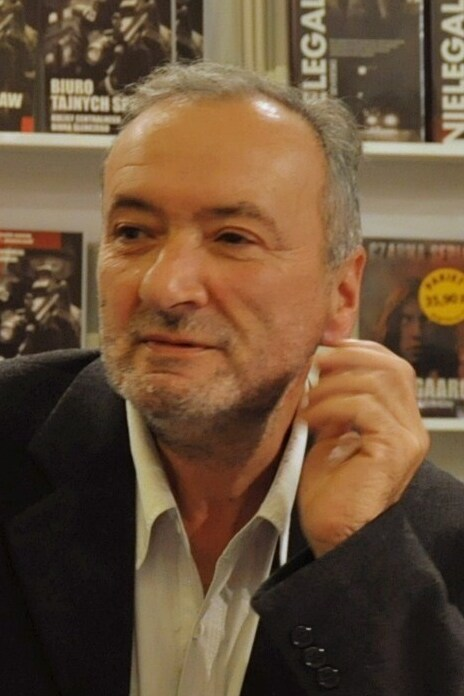
- Piotr Pytlakowski in 2012
- Born: 25 November 1951; Warsaw, Poland
- Died: 31 December 2024 (aged 73)
- Education: Institute of Journalism at the University of Warsaw
- Occupation(s): Journalist, screenwriter
- Employer(s): Gazeta Wyborcza; Życie Warszawy; Życie; Polityka
- Parent(s): Jerzy Pytlakowski and Sabina née Wiernik

Piotr Pytlakowski (25 November 1951 – 31 December 2024) was a Polish journalist and screenwriter, from 1997 associated with the weekly magazine Polityka.

== Life and career ==
Piotr Pytlakowski was the son of Jerzy Pytlakowski and Sabina née Wiernik (1918–1990). His mother came from a Jewish family.

He completed an extramural professional study of political science for journalist at the Institute of Journalism at the University of Warsaw. He worked, among others in Gazeta Wyborcza, Życie Warszawy, Życie, and since 1997 he has been associated with the weekly Polityka, where he handled investigative journalism and criminal issues.

Pytlakowski won the Grand Press laureate in the "investigative journalism" category in 1999.

Pytlakowski died on 31 December 2024, at the age of 73.

== Filmography ==
- W poszukiwaniu utraconych lat (2001)
- Alfabet mafii (2004)
- Alfabet mafii. Dekada mafijnej Warszawy (2004)
- Świadek koronny (2007)
- Odwróceni (2007)
- Ścigany (2010)
- Wszystkie ręce umyte. Sprawa Barbary Blidy (2010)
- Zbrodnie, które wstrząsnęły Polską (2012)

== Publications ==
- Piotr Pytlakowski, Republika MSW, Warszawa: „Andy Grafik” 1991, ISBN 978-83-85265-11-5.
- Piotr Pytlakowski, Czekając na kata. Rozmowy ze skazanymi na śmierć, Warszawa: Niezależna Oficyna Wydawnicza 1996, ISBN 978-83-7054-099-9.
- Ewa Ornacka, Piotr Pytlakowski, Alfabet mafii, Warszawa: Prószyński i S-ka 2004, ISBN 978-83-7337-889-6.
- Sylwester Latkowski, Piotr Pytlakowski, Olewnik. Śmierć za 300 tysięcy, Warszawa: Świat Książki 2009, ISBN 978-83-247-1680-7.
- Sylwester Latkowski, Piotr Pytlakowski, Wszystkie Ręce Umyte. Sprawa Barbary Blidy, Warszawa: Wydawnictwo MUZA S.A. 2010, ISBN 978-83-7495-878-3.
- Sylwester Latkowski, Piotr Pytlakowski, Agent Tomasz i Inni. Przykrywkowcy, Warszawa: Świat Książki 2010, ISBN 978-83-247-1916-7.
- Sylwester Latkowski, Piotr Pytlakowski, Biuro tajnych spraw. Kulisy Centralnego Biura Śledczego, Warszawa, Wydawnictwo Czarna Owca 2012, ISBN 978-83-7554-432-9.
- Ewa Ornacka, Piotr Pytlakowski, Nowy alfabet mafii, Dom wydawniczy Rebis 2013
- Piotr Pytlakowski, Szkoła szpiegów, Warszawa, Wydawnictwo Czerwone i Czarne 2014, ISBN 978-83-7700-158-5.
- Piotr Pytlakowski, Piotr Wróbel, Mój agent Masa, Poznań, Dom wydawniczy Rebis 2015
- Piotr Pytlakowski, Wspomnienia konduktora wagonów sypialnych. Powieść osobista, Warszawa: Wydawnictwo Czerwone i Czarne 2017, ISBN 978-83-7700-267-4
