= Marcin Wiącek =

Polish lawyer (born 1982)

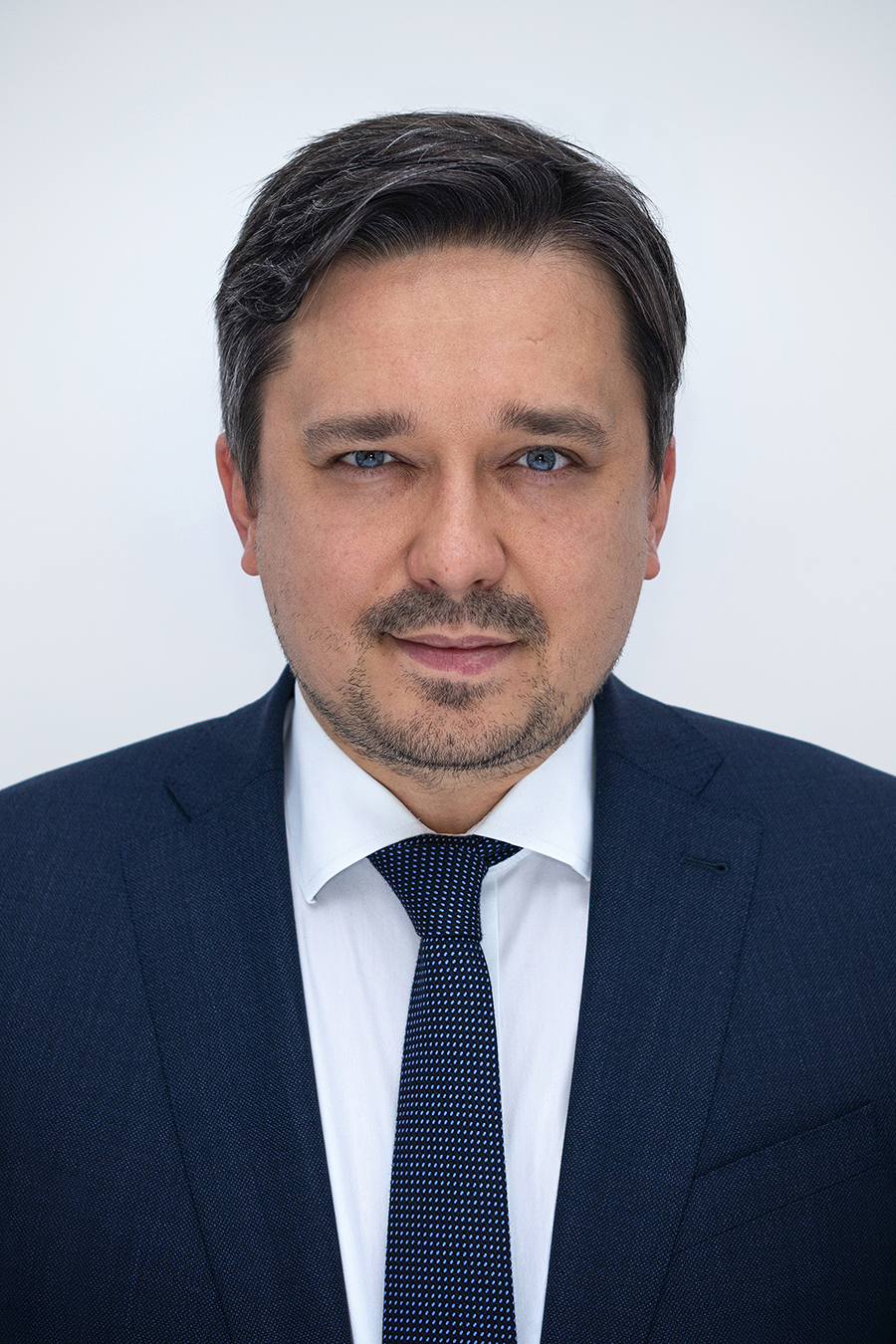
- Marcin Wiącek, 2023
- Born: 28 March 1982 (age 44); Mińsk Mazowiecki
- Education: University of Warsaw
- Employer: University of Warsaw

Marcin Wiącek (born 28 March 1982) is a jurist, professor at the University of Warsaw, from 2021 to 2026 Commissioner for Human Rights of Poland.

== Biography ==
He was born in Mińsk Mazowiecki. He graduated from the Faculty of Law and Administration at the University of Warsaw and the Center for American Law in 2006. He defended his doctoral thesis in 2009, under the supervision of Janusz Trzciński. In 2013 he obtained habilitation.

From 2003 to 2007, he worked at the Constitutional Tribunal. From 2007 to 2021, he was employed in the Supreme Administrative Court. In 2021 he was appointed Commissioner for Human Rights.

He supervised four doctoral dissertations.

== Books ==
- Znaczenie stosowania Konstytucji marcowej w Polsce Ludowej dla orzecznictwa sądów i Trybunału Konstytucyjnego III RP. Warszawa. 2012.
- Pytanie prawne sądu do Trybunału Konstytucyjnego. Warszawa. 2011.
- Na straży państwa prawa: trzydzieści lat orzecznictwa Trybunału Konstytucyjnego. Warszawa. 2016. Co-authored with Lech Garlicki and Marta Derlatka.
- Prawa człowieka. Warszawa. 2018. Co-authored with Wojciech Brzozowski and Adam Krzywoń.
