= Władysław Frasyniuk =

Polish politician

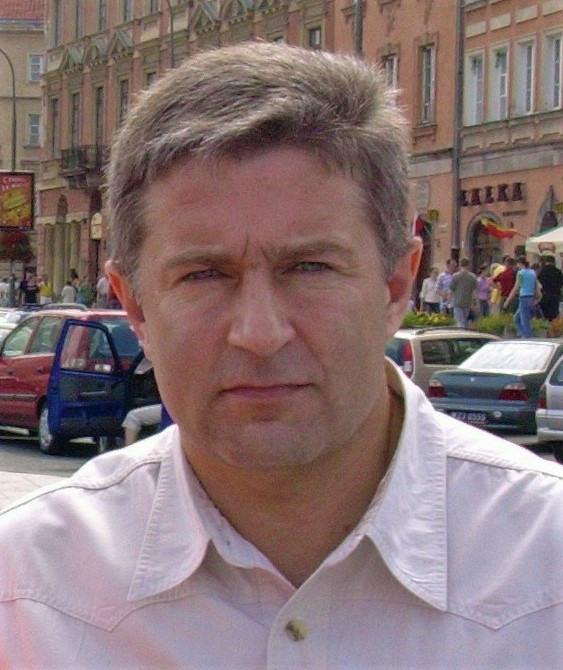
Władysław Frasyniuk

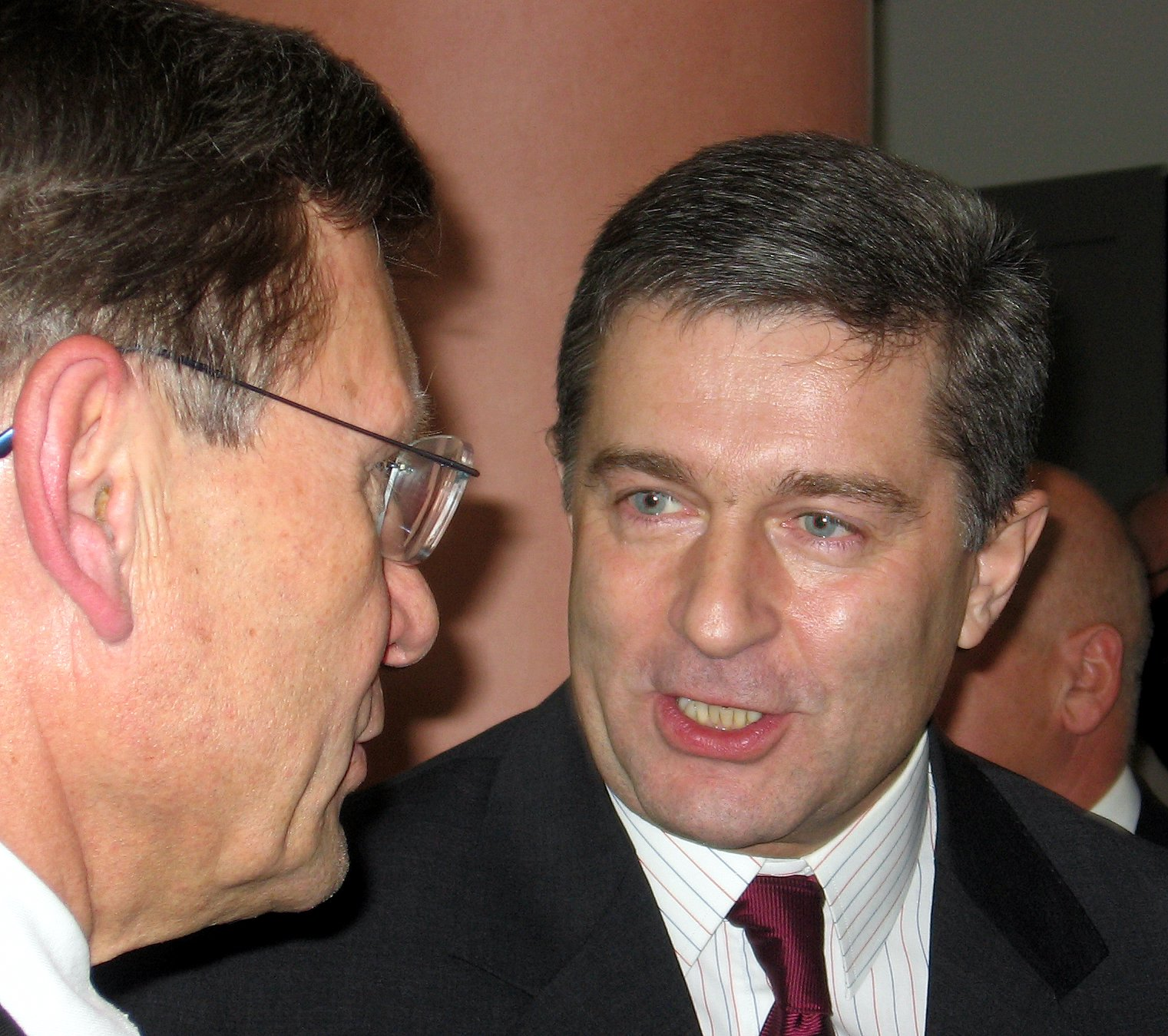
Frasyniuk talking to Leszek Balcerowicz (left)

Władysław Frasyniuk (born 25 November 1954 in Wrocław) is a Polish politician, former activist of Solidarity trade union, and former chairman of the Partia Demokratyczna – demokraci.pl political party. He served as a member of the Sejm (Polish parliament) from 1991 to 2001.

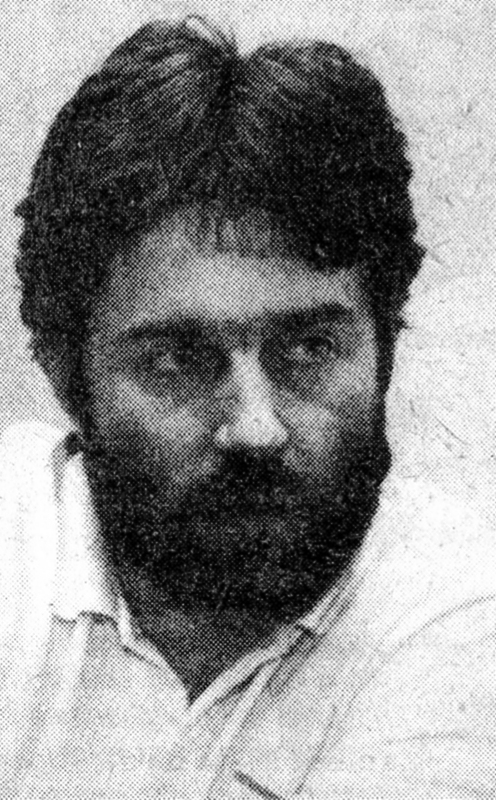
Frasyniuk in 1990

== Life and career ==
A member of Solidarity in Lower Silesia from its inception, he was one of the founders of the Temporary Coordinating Committee (Tymczasowa Komisja Koordynacyjna), which served as an underground leadership of Solidarity after the government crackdown on Solidarity following the imposition of martial law. For his activity he was arrested, spent time in jail and was released under a general amnesty in 1986. In 1987 he was a member of the Temporary Council of NSZZ Solidarność (Tymczasowa Rada NSZZ Solidarność), and later of the Country Executive Committee of NSZZ Solidarność (Krajowa Komisja Wykonawcza NSZZ Solidarność). In 1989 he was one of the opposition delegates to the Polish Round Table Negotiations. In 1990 he was a member of the Solidarity Citizens' Committee (Komitet Obywatelski "Solidarność").

In the new Poland, he was a member of liberal centrist parties. In 1990 he was a cofounder of the Citizens' Movement for Democratic Action (Ruch Obywatelski Akcja Demokratyczna, ROAD) (1990–1991). He was a member of the Democratic Union (Unia Demokratyczna) (1991–1994) and its vice-chairman (1991–1993), and after this party merged with the Freedom Union (Unia Wolności) he was its member (1994–2001) and chairman (1999–2005). He became one of the founders and the first chairman of the newest incarnation of that party, Partia Demokratyczna – demokraci.pl (2005–present). He resigned from the position in March 2006.

== After 2015 ==
Since Law and Justice came into power in Poland, Frasyniuk has been actively engaged in protests against their policy. He participates in Committee for the Defence of Democracy and Citizens of Poland demonstrations. During one of the Citizens of Poland demonstrations he was accused of assaulting a policeman and later detained.

== See also ==
- History of Solidarity
- List of people from Wrocław
