= Andrzej Zoll =

Polish lawyer and judge (born 1942)

Andrzej Stanisław Zoll
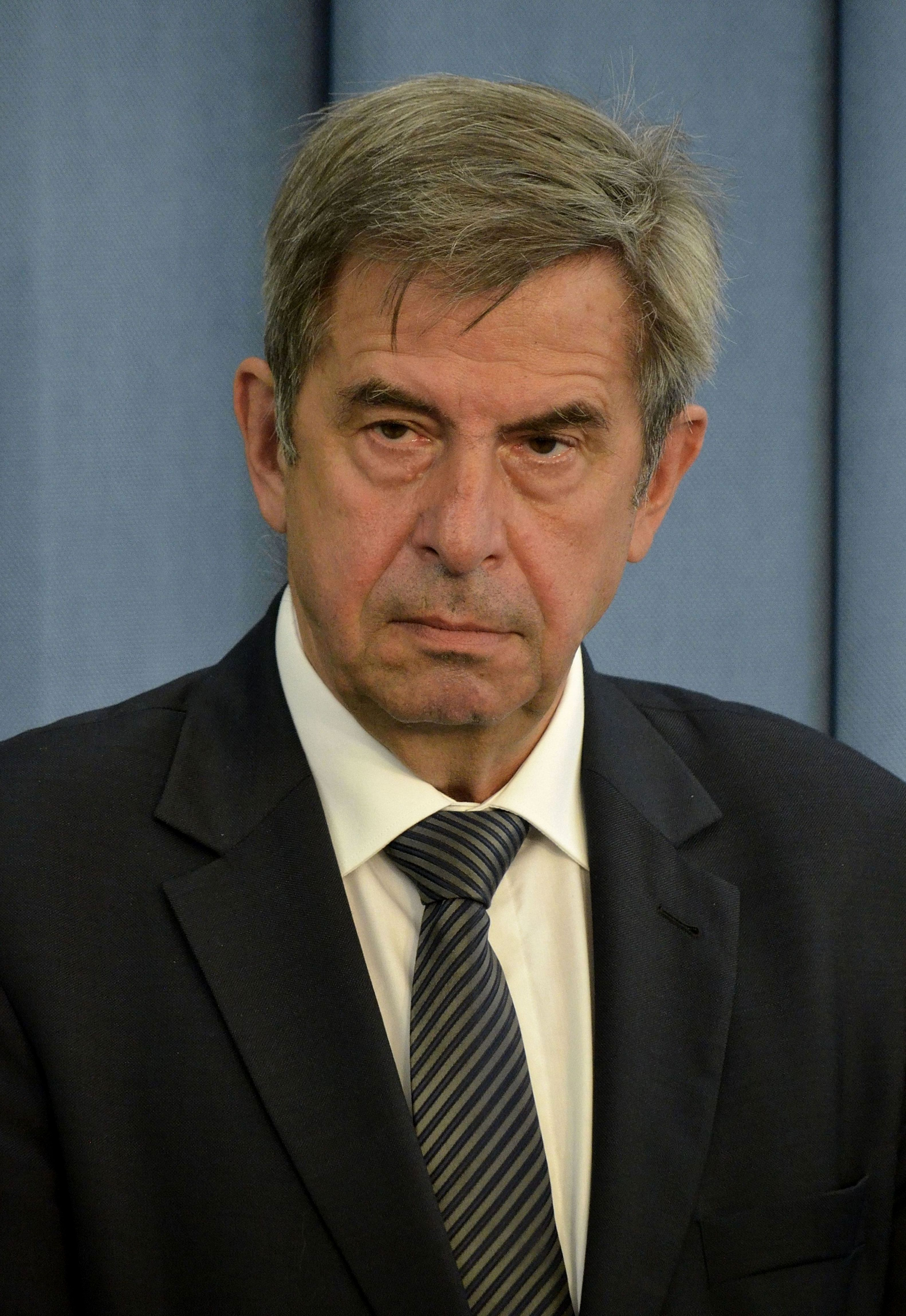
- Zoll in 2015

4th Ombudsman for Citizen Rights
- In office June 30, 2000 – January 27, 2006
- President: Aleksander Kwaśniewski; Lech Kaczyński
- Prime Minister: Jerzy Buzek; Leszek Miller; Marek Belka; Kazimierz Marcinkiewicz
- Preceded by: Adam Zieliński
- Succeeded by: Janusz Kochanowski

3rd President of the Constitutional Tribunal
- In office November 19, 1993 – December 1, 1997
- President: Lech Wałęsa; Aleksander Kwaśniewski
- Prime Minister: Waldemar Pawlak; Józef Oleksy; Włodzimierz Cimoszewicz; Jerzy Buzek
- Preceded by: Mieczysław Tyczka
- Succeeded by: Marek Safjan

Personal details
- Born: 27 May 1942 (age 84) Sieniawa, Poland
- Profession: Lawyer

Andrzej Stanisław Zoll (born 27 May 1942) is a Polish lawyer, former judge and president of the Polish Constitutional Tribunal, former Polish Ombudsman, former president of the State Electoral Commission, former president of the Legislative Council, co-author of the Polish Penal Code of 1997. Professor of criminal law at the Jagiellonian University.

== Biography ==
Andrzej Zoll was born in Sieniawa, Poland. He graduated from the Faculty of Law of the Jagiellonian University in 1964. He earned his Ph.D. in 1968, and a habilitated doctor's title in 1973. In 1988 he became professor of legal sciences. Since 1994 he heads the Chair of Criminal Law of the Jagiellonian University.

In 1989 he took part in the Round Table Negotiations as Solidarity’s legal expert.

Zoll is a member of the Polish Academy of Sciences and the European Art and Science Academy in Salzburg. Between 1989 and 1993, he served as a judge of the Polish Constitutional Tribunal and between 1990 and 1993 he was chairman of the State Electoral Committee. In 2002, he was appointed deputy director at the European Ombudsman Institute. Since 2000 until 2006, he served as Polish Ombudsman for Citizens' Rights.

He is also the author of 3 monographs and above 150 other publications in the area of criminal and constitutional law and philosophy of law, and a member of the Committee on Ethics of the Polish Academy of Sciences, as well as the Department of History and Philosophy of the Polish Academy of Learning, and Curator of the Association of Law Students' Library of the Jagiellonian University.

== Distinctions ==
- Commander's Cross of the Polonia Restituta
- Great Cross with Star of the Order of Merit of the Federal Republic of Germany
- Grand Decoration of Honour in Gold with Sash for Services to the Republic of Austria (1997)
- Order of the Lithuanian Grand Duke Gediminas (Lithuania)
- Doctor honoris causa of the universities of Vilnius and Mainz

== See also ==
- Politics of Poland
