= Irena Lipowicz =

Polish politician and official (born 1953)

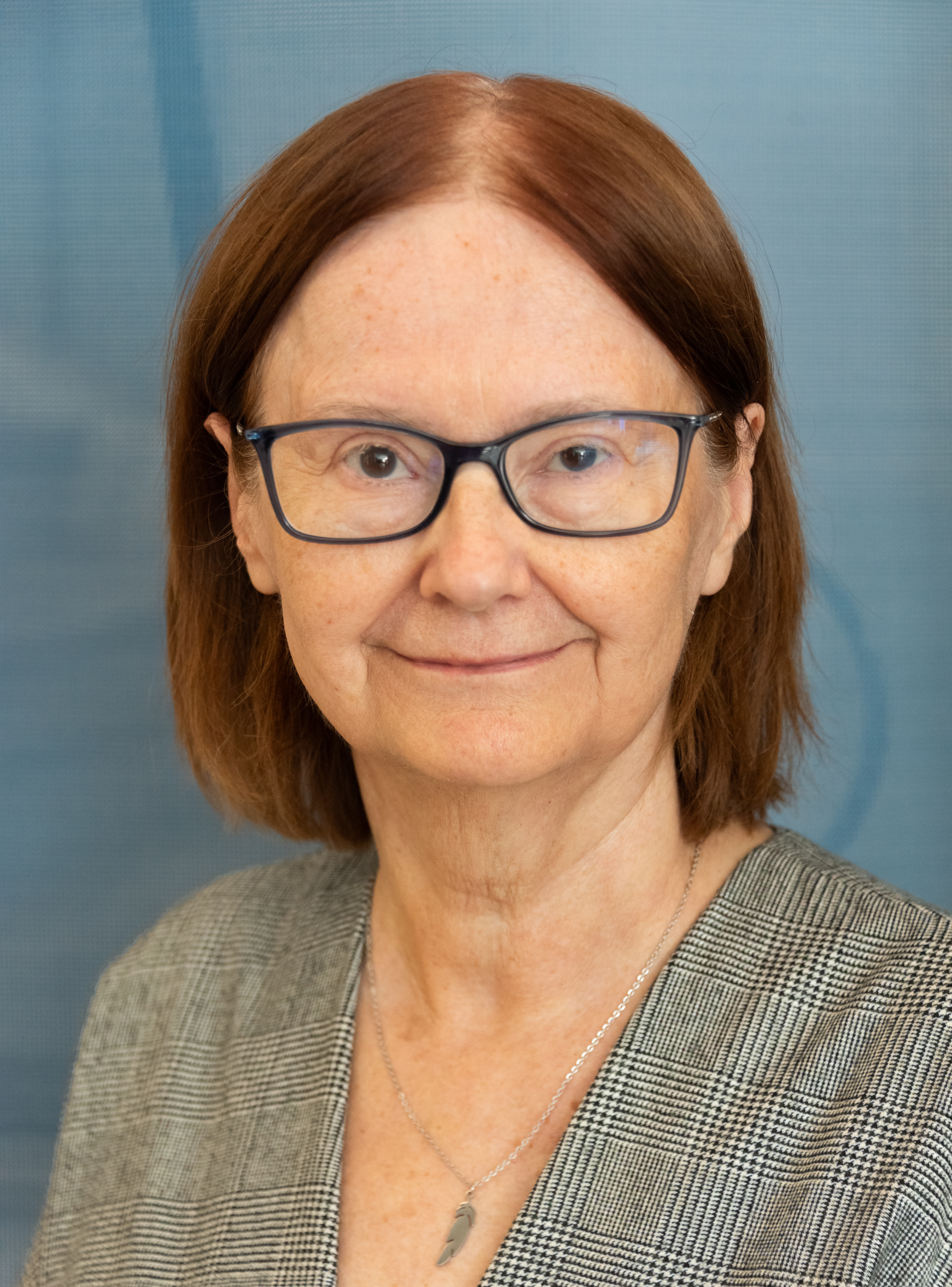
- Irena Lipowicz, 2024
- Born: 9 June 1953 (age 73); Gliwice
- Education: University of Silesia in Katowice
- Occupations: Politician, official, diplomat

Irena Ewa Lipowicz (born 9 June 1953) is a politician, official, diplomat, and professor at the Cardinal Stefan Wyszyński University in Warsaw.

== Biography ==
In 1972 she passed matura. In 1976 she graduated with distinction in law from the Law and Administration Faculty of the University of Silesia in Katowice. In 1980 she joined Solidarity. In 1981 she obtained doctorate at the University of Silesia, upon dissertation Sytuacja systemu informatycznego w sferze prawa administracyjnego supervised by Karol Sobczak. In 1992 she obtained habilitation. From 1999 she has been employed at the Cardinal Stefan Wyszyński University in Warsaw. In 2020 she obtained title of professor. She supervised six doctoral dissertations.

In the early 1990s she was a member of Democratic Union. She was member of Sejm from 1991 to 2000. She was ambassador of Poland to Austria from 2000 to 2004. She then was appointed Commissioner for Human Rights of Poland from 2010 to 2015. In January 2015, she became the Chair of the Board of the International Ombudsman Institute (IOI) for the European region.

== Awards ==
- Grand Decoration of Honour in Gold for Services to the Republic of Austria (Großes Goldenes Ehrenzeichen; 1999)
- Grzegorz Palka Award (1999)
- Edward J. Wende Award (2005)
- Order of Merit of the Federal Republic of Germany
- Knight's Cross of the Order of Polonia Restituta (2009)
- Honorary degree of the Osnabrück University (2009)
- Wojciech Korfanty Award (2011)
- Viadrina Award (2014)
- Princess Hedwig of Silesia Award (2015)
- Michał Serzycki Award (2019)
