= 2026 Polish Constitutional Tribunal crisis =

Suspension of the tribunal's president

- Part of the Polish Constitutional Tribunal crisis and the 2015–present Polish rule-of-law crisis
- Bogdan Święczkowski (left) and Anna Korwin-Piotrowska (right)
- Date: Prelude: 13 March 2026 – 30 October 2026 (Note: On 13 March 2026, the Sejm voted to elect six justices, but President Karol Nawrocki only accepted the oaths of two, contesting the appointment of the remaining four; later, on 4 September 2026, Maciej Berek was elected by the Sejm to the Constitutional Tribunal but his appointment was not recognised by the president, leading Berek to take his oath in parliament on 14 October 2026.) (7 months, 2 weeks and 3 days); Escalation: 30 October 2026 – present (2 weeks and 6 days)
- Location: Warsaw, Poland
- Methods: Demonstrations, references to legal texts

Parties
| Święczkowski supporters: Institutions: Chancellery of the President; National Security Bureau; Supreme Court of Poland; Political parties: Law and Justice; Confederation; The Crown; Development Plus; Kukiz'15; Activist groups: Border Defence Movement; Club of Gazeta Polska; Solidarity trade union of Police; All-Polish Youth; Media: Telewizja Republika; WPolsce24; Gazeta Polska; Sieci; Najwyższy Czas! | Korwin-Piotrowska supporters: Institutions: Office of the Prime Minister; Law enforcement: Police; Political parties: 15 October Coalition; Civic Coalition; Elements of New Left (Note: While the party's parliamentary group leader (Anna Maria Żukowska) opposed a forceful takeover, few notable members (such as Krzysztof Gawkowski) argued in favour of it. New Left also refused to partake in a meeting with the president following the standoff.); Activist groups: Committee for the Defence of Democracy |

Lead figures
| Karol Nawrocki; Bogdan Święczkowski... and others: Bartłomiej Sochański; Jarosław Kaczyński; Bartosz Grodecki; Zbigniew Bogucki; Krzysztof Bosak; Sławomir Mentzen; Grzegorz Braun; Mateusz Morawiecki; Robert Bąkiewicz | Donald Tusk; Anna Korwin-Piotrowska... and others: Waldemar Żurek; Radosław Sikorski; Maciej Berek; Marcin Dziurda; Krystian Markiewicz; Maciej Taborowski; Krzysztof Gawkowski; Lech Wałęsa |

The Polish constitutional crisis, which began in 2015, continued into 2026 between Prime Minister Donald Tusk's pro-European Union government and the right-wing, nationalist party Law and Justice (PiS) over control of the judiciary. In 2026, the Sejm elected eight judges to the Constitutional Tribunal (six in March, one in June, and one in September). President of Poland Karol Nawrocki invited three of the judges to swearing-in ceremonies at the Presidential Palace and refused to swear in the other five. On 13 October, the Venice Commission stated that all eight judges were full members of the tribunal. On 16 October, the eight new judges made a public statement asserting that Article 194 of the Polish Constitution gives no power to the Polish president in selecting members of the tribunal. By late October, the president of the tribunal, Bogdan Święczkowski, had not recognised the five judges as members of the tribunal, and filed a disciplinary case against the other three judges, attaching the eight judges' public statement as evidence in the case.

On 30 October 2026, Święczkowski and the vice-president of the tribunal, Bartłomiej Sochański, were suspended for a month by judge Anna Korwin-Piotrowska. An X account associated with the tribunal, and members of PiS, viewed the suspension of Święczkowski and the deployment of police to the tribunal as an attempted coup. Korwin-Piotrowska invited Nawrocki to meet her on his own at the tribunal building on the night of 30–31 October. Nawrocki then arrived at the building along with Sochański, Zbigniew Kapiński, and others. A physical altercation occurred between Nawrocki's group and Korwin-Piotrowska alongside a group of constitutional tribunal judges. This led to Nawrocki's group gaining access to the building with his group. Talks took place following this, and both Sochański and Nawrocki left the building a few hours later.

Nawrocki met with representatives of some parliamentary parties, Tusk made a televised speech, and several political parties proposed to modify and update the composition of the tribunal by a "reset". The Supreme Court criticised the suspension of Święczkowski as unconstitutional. The tribunal held a General Assembly on 3 November with eight judges present, in which the 2027 tribunal budget was voted, and held another General Assembly on 10 November, in which the powers of the tribunal president were weakened in favour of the full tribunal membership. The tribunal started work on the 100 oldest cases from 2013 to 2021 that were still pending.

== Background ==
V-Dem Democracy Indices for electoral democracy (solid) and liberal democracy (dotted) for Poland since 1980. By 2017, the PiS government had "tightened its grip over the Constitutional Tribunal[,] altering its composition and curbing its powers" and increased government influence in "public media, civil service and [the] education system".

In June 2015, the outgoing centre-right Civic Platform–PSL government adopted a new Constitutional Tribunal act that repealed the previously binding act of 1997 and introduced transitional provisions allowing the Sejm to appoint new judges to the tribunal to replace judges whose term expires within 30 days of the new appointment. This act was signed by the outgoing president Bronisław Komorowski on 21 July, before his term ended following his defeat in the May 2015 election. In the October 2015 election, Law and Justice won an outright majority. Shortly before the new Sejm was to be sworn in, the outgoing PO–PSL government appointed five judges to the tribunal to fill vacancies for judges whose terms would expire in November and December.

The new right-wing United Right government was inaugurated in November 2015. It declared the outgoing Sejm's judge nominations from October null and void, citing procedural irregularities. The new president Andrzej Duda also refused to swear in the judges, and no ceremony was organised. On 30 November, the tribunal issued an interim injunction asking the Sejm to not appoint new judges prior to a judgement on the constitutionality of the 2015 Act. The government argued that the tribunal had no legal basis to issue injunctions, while the tribunal argued that it had such power mutatis mutandis on the basis of the socialist Civil Procedure Code 1964.

In December 2015, the tribunal ruled that three judges appointed by the PO–PSL government were constitutional, while two were invalid, stating that the PO–PSL government had no right to fill vacancies that would emerge in December 2015. However, the government rejected this ruling, and appointed its own five judges to fill the incoming vacancies. In response, the tribunal president Andrzej Rzepliński allowed two United Right judges in the tribunal, but did not assign cases to the other three, who were given offices and paid salaries.

On 22 December, the Sejm adopted an amendment modifying the 2015 Act. The amendment envisaged that the rulings of the tribunal must be decided in plenary sessions with at least thirteen judges present in order to be valid, and that its judgements must be adopted by the two-thirds majority. In response, the tribunal, in a session of twelve judges, ruled this amendment unconstitutional with the majority of eight judges. However, the government declared this ruling null and void because it fell below the threshold of thirteen judges being present, and refused to publish this ruling in Dziennik Ustaw, which is a requirement for the tribunal's ruling to come into force. In July 2016, the government fully repealed the 2015 Act and implemented a new one. In December 2016, Rzepliński's term expired, and President Andrzej Duda appointed Julia Przyłębska as president of the tribunal.

In May 2021, in the case Xero Flor v Poland, the European Court of Human Rights ruled that the Tribunal was not a legally established court, and that the company Xero Flor had thus been denied the right to a fair trial in the sense of Article 6 of the European Convention on Human Rights.

In the 2023 Polish parliamentary election, the United Right government lost its majority and a new government of various opposition parties, the 15 October Coalition, was formed. By this time, the tribunal had already been fully composed of judges appointed by the United Right government from 2015 to 2023. The new government questioned the legality of three United Right's appointments, namely Julia Przyłębska, Justyn Piskorski, and Jarosław Wyrembak. In March 2024, the Sejm adopted a directive declaring the United Right's legislation on the tribunal unconstitutional. The government was unable to change the existing laws on the tribunal because of the opposition of President Andrzej Duda. The new president who was elected in the 2025 Polish presidential election, Karol Nawrocki, likewise opposed the government's attempts to do so.

In 2025, in case C‑448/23, European Commission v. Republic of Poland, the tribunal was again ruled illegitimate, this time by the Court of Justice of the European Union, which found that the tribunal did not satisfy the requirements of an independent and impartial tribunal established by law. Key reasons for the finding were the irregularity in the 2015 appointment of three judges, and later of their successors, and irregularities in the 2016 appointment of the president of the tribunal. The Tusk government, similarly to what the United Right did in 2016, refused to publish the tribunal's rulings in Dziennik Ustaw in order to deprive them of their effects.

== Prelude ==
17 October 2026 photo of protestors in front of the Constitutional Tribunal by Border Defence Movement

After coming to power, the 15 October Coalition implemented a strategy of "marginalising" the Constitutional Tribunal by refusing to publish its rulings in Dziennik Ustaw and not filling vacant seats left by judges retiring or dying. In July 2025, there were four vacant seats in the tribunal, a fifth was expected to become vacant on 5 December 2025 following the end of Krystyna Pawłowicz's term, and three more were expected to become vacant in 2026. PiS nominated candidates for the tribunal in February, May, and September 2025; none succeeded in votes in the Sejm.

According to Polish Press Agency, the 15 October Coalition deliberately chose not to fill the tribunal vacancies, perceiving nominating judges for it as legitimising the tribunal. Andrzej Szejna of The Left viewed the tribunal as a "facade", and stated that the government should not "fuel" it by nominating new judges, as that would legally empower a tribunal "headed by Mr. Święczkowski and PiS politicians". Similarly, Arkadiusz Myrcha, the Deputy Minister of Justice, argued that there was no need to fill vacancies in the tribunal as "the Polish state has learned to function without the Constitutional Tribunal in recent years." Legal experts criticised the government for accumulating tribunal vacancies and electing new judges en masse; professor of law at the University of Wrocław and former judge of the State Tribunal, Tomasz Zalasiński, argued that judges should be elected individually, and doing otherwise would be "inconsistent with the constitutional idea of the Tribunal" and would "lead to the erosion of the Constitutional Tribunal's jurisprudence".

The Sejm elected eight judges to the tribunal in 2026. On 13 March 2026, it elected Magdalena Bentkowska, Marcin Dziurda, Anna Korwin-Piotrowska, Krystian Markiewicz, Dariusz Szostek, and Maciej Taborowski as tribunal members. Sławomir Patyra and Maciej Berek were elected by the Sejm as tribunal members on 11 June and 4 September 2026, respectively. President Nawrocki invited three of the newly elected members, Bentkowska, Szostek, and Patyra, to the Presidential Palace, where they were ceremonially sworn in. Nawrocki refused to swear in the other five of the elected judges, Berek, Dziurda, Korwin-Piotrowska, Markiewicz, and Taborowski, arguing that he would swear in judges elected to fill vacancies that emerged after his inauguration. He accused the government of "deliberately and maliciously blocking the election of judges for over a year", which he saw as "a conscious violation of the Constitution". On 6 May 2026, the European Court of Human Rights (ECtHR) issued interim measures requesting the Polish government to "ensure that its competent authorities refrain from hindering the taking up and exercise of judicial duties by [Dziurda, Korwin-Piotrowska, Markiewicz, and Taborowski] as judges of the Constitutional Court until any further decision on the applicants' request for interim measures is taken". The ECtHR request referred to the 2021 Xero Flor v. Poland ruling, in which the Constitutional Tribunal had been found to not be a legally established court.

Bogdan Święczkowski, the president of the tribunal, declared that the five judges would not be allowed in the tribunal until they were sworn in before the president. Nawrocki particularly objected to the nomination of Berek, who was one of the Tusk government's ministers until 2025 and who has close ties to the Prime Minister Donald Tusk, who once described him as his "right-hand man". This nomination was also criticised by some members of the government.

Nawrocki stated that those who did not take the oath before the president could not be judges in the tribunal, and that he would not swear in Berek until Berek provided documentary evidence that he meets the requirements for the appointment, including 10 years of legal practice. On 13 October, the Venice Commission, an advisory body to the Council of Europe, issued a non-binding opinion, calling on Nawrocki to swear in the remaining judges immediately, "without claiming any power to review the election procedure", and stating that it is "constitutionally justified to permit the assumption of office ... without the President's participation where the President unlawfully refuses to administer the oath." By 14 October, the five judges that Nawrocki refused to swear in took an oath before the Sejm instead, directing their oaths at the absent president.

On 16 October, the eight new judges published an eight-point public statement. The judges asserted that Article 194 of the Polish Constitution gives no role to the Polish president in choosing Constitutional Tribunal judges nor in swearing them in and that the swearing in at the Presidential Palace is only a tradition. They stated that the Presidential office invited only three of them to the Presidential Palace, despite repeated requests; they viewed this as "an arbitrary attempt" to participate in the selection procedure. The judges stated that they had officially declared their allegiance to the president, that the legal conditions of swearing-in had been satisfied, and that all eight judges should be immediately permitted to start hearing cases. The judges declared that they intended to legally restore the function of the tribunal to its legal role as a constitutional institution.

By 19 October, the Venice Commission and many judges stated that all eight judges were full members of the tribunal despite taking an oath without the president. On 27 October, the Polish Press Agency (PAP) described what it saw as an unlikely scenario for the tribunal, with Nawrocki swearing in the remaining judges and Święczkowski holding a General Assembly, and a most likely scenario in which a General Assembly including all the newly elected judges would be held and Święczkowski would be removed from his role as leader. PAP also referred to a "constitutional reset" scenario along the lines proposed by Tomasz Zalasiński, in which a new law would define the tribunal's structure. Possible elements of the new law would include elections of seven members by the Sejm, five by the Polish Senate, and three by the Polish President; a four-year delay would be imposed before a parliamentarian or government cabinet member would be eligible as a tribunal member; the tribunal president would have a three-year term; and special conditions would be set for the transitional period. Zalasiński recommended that two draft laws to implement the reset be prepared by apolitical experts, not politicians, with participation by non-governmental organisations, and that the proposals should be subject to wide public consultation. If the draft laws received wide public support, then they should be presented to the President and two houses of parliament and, according to Zalasiński, would then have a chance of satisfying Article 235 of the Polish Constitution on constitutional amendments.

By the end of October 2026, Święczkowski as well as Bartłomiej Sochański, the deputy head of the tribunal, had not allowed five of the eight to start their duties in the tribunal. Święczkowski started a disciplinary case against Bentkowska, Szostek, and Patyra, including the three judges' co-signing of the eight judges' public statement as part of the case against the three.

The numbers of cases unhandled by the tribunal continued to increase during 2026. Korwin-Piotrowska stated on 2 November 2026 that the tribunal had over 1100 pending cases, 700 of which had not been processed, and that the budget for 2027 had not yet been allocated.

== Events ==
=== Suspension of Święczkowski ===
On 30 October, Anna Korwin-Piotrowska suspended Święczkowski and Sochański from their roles for a month, and filed four legal cases against Święczkowski. The suspension was declared in an official statement by the Constitutional Tribunal, which stated that the suspension of Święczkowski and Sochański was based on Article 130 of the Law on the system of ordinary courts, which is referred to by Article 19 of the November 2016 law on the status of Constitutional Tribunal judges via Article 10.1 of the December 2017 law on the Supreme Court.

Reuters reported that Polish police entered the tribunal premises following incidents outside the court. Dozens of police officers, including riot police, guarded the building's entrance.

Polish Justice Minister and Public Prosecutor General Waldemar Żurek stated to journalists that he had applied to lift the immunity of Święczkowski and Sochański.

Trybunał Konstytucyjny
(@TK_GOV_PL)
tweeted:

Polish:

Nastąpiło bezprawne przejęcie strony internetowej Trybunału Konstytucyjnego.

Prezesem @TK_GOV_PL jest nadal Bogdan Święczkowski, a Wiceprezesem Bartłomiej Sochański.

Pani Anna Korwin-Piotrowska nie jest sędzią Trybunału Konstytucyjnego.

Wszystkie osoby uczestniczące w niniejszych działaniach popełniają przestępstwo zamachu stanu.

Translation:

There has been an unlawful takeover of the web page of the constitutional court. The president of @TK_GOV_PL is still Bogdan Święczkowski and the vice-president is Bartłomiej Sochański. Anna Korwin-Piotrowska is not a judge of the constitutional court. Everyone who participated in these actions is committing the crime of a coup.

30 October 2026 (Note: Interia associates this X/Twitter account with the tribunal.)

The tribunal website's announcement of Święczkowski's suspension was published around 18:00 local time on the evening of 30 October, before being taken offline. At 18:25, an X/Twitter account associated with the tribunal according to Interia stated that "an unlawful takeover of the Constitutional Tribunal's website has been attempted", and that "all people responsible are instigating a coup d'état." Minister of Justice Waldemar Żurek stated that a coup against the tribunal had started several years earlier.

=== Nawrocki's visit to the tribunal building ===
In an interview with Polsat News around 23:00, Korwin-Piotrowska stated that she was willing to allow Nawrocki to enter the building and meet with her on the condition that Nawrocki entered alone and that nobody else was allowed in. She stated that she would give appropriate instructions to the police should the president assure her that he would come alone.

Nawrocki, who was flying to Senegal when the police were deployed on the tribunal's grounds, returned to Poland and held an emergency meeting in the Presidential Palace together with Zbigniew Kapiński, the First President of the Supreme Court of the Republic of Poland. The meeting ended shortly after midnight on 31 October.

At 00:36, the presidential limousines set off for the Constitutional Tribunal. Korwin-Piotrowska stated that in order to allow Nawrocki to discuss the situation, she authorised the presidential convoy to enter the tribunal grounds. She stated that she and the other judges waited at the side entrance where VIPs' cars normally arrived, in front of the door. Korwin-Piotrowska said that she stood in front of the other judges.

Afterwards, Nawrocki attempted to enter the building of the tribunal together with Kapiński. According to Korwin-Piotrowska, she heard Nawrocki arriving together with a group of people, stating that he was arriving, and appearing to intend to ram through the group of judges without stopping. She said that Nawrocki made a first unsuccessful attempt to push through, and then pushed her and the other judges aside with his hands. This physical contact between Nawrocki, Korwin-Piotrowska, and Markiewicz was described by a presidential spokesperson, who stated that "judges Markiewicz and Korwin-Piotrowska had tried to manhandle the President, thereby violating the head of state's inviolability", while Berek accused Nawrocki of "physically attacking" the two judges and posted a video of the confrontation on social media.

Zbigniew Bogucki, Sochański, and people unknown to Korwin-Piotrowska entered following Nawrocki. Korwin-Piotrowska said that she started greeting Nawrocki, but he was unwilling to respond, and instead walked into the lobby, yelled out that the judges were not members of the Constitutional Tribunal except for Patyra, and walked up a stairway. Sochański asked for a room for Nawrocki and said that he wanted to have a conversation. Korwin-Piotrowska gave Sochański a key to a room. She said that she gave him the key because he appeared to be exhausted.

After 03:00, a photo showing Nawrocki, Kapiński, the Chief of the Presidential Chancellery Zbigniew Bogucki, the head of the National Security Bureau Bartosz Grodecki, as well as Sochański inside the building of the tribunal was published. A spokesperson of the tribunal, Weronika Ścibor, stated that Bartłomiej Sochański was in his office and that the declaration issued by Anna Korwin-Piotrowska of his suspension was "non-existing". In an official statement, Nawrocki stated that he "enabled the legally serving Vice-President of the Constitutional Tribunal, Judge Bartłomiej Sochański, to enter the Constitutional Tribunal".

By around 04:00, Korwin-Piotrowska and the other judges felt it was best to postpone further talks, and one of them left with Sochański, taking him home due to concerns about Sochański's condition. A few moments later, a big group of people including Nawrocki left the tribunal building.

=== Aftermath ===
On the morning of 31 October, Nawrocki declared that due to the "threat to the internal security of the Republic of Poland", he had called for an emergency meeting with representatives of parliamentary forces in order to "restore constitutional order".

According to journalist Ewa Siedlecka, Korwin-Piotrowska announced that a General Assembly of the tribunal would be held on 3 November 2026 to establish the tribunal's budget for 2027. Korwin-Piotrowska issued an order recommending that the judges perform their duties outside the tribunal's building because of security concerns. She suspended the tribunal's employees from performing their duties and suspended the operations of the tribunal's registry office, its chancellery, and legal service office. In an attempt to challenge Korwin-Piotrowska's order, Święczkowski issued his own, designating 3–6 November as paid days off for tribunal employees.

On 31 October, starting at 13:00 local time, Nawrocki met with the representatives of parliamentary parties, including Władysław Kosiniak-Kamysz of Polish People's Party, Szymon Hołownia of Poland 2050, Mateusz Morawiecki of Development Plus, Sławomir Mentzen and Krzysztof Bosak of Confederation Liberty and Independence, Jarosław Kaczyński and Mariusz Błaszczak of Law and Justice, as well as representatives of the Together Party, including the party's leader Adrian Zandberg. The New Left and Civic Coalition refused to send any representatives to the president.

On 31 October, the police section of the Solidarity trade union challenged the legality of the police deployment around the Constitutional Tribunal building. However, according to Interia, the leader of the trade union was consequently subject to disciplinary hearings by the police.

Tusk made a televised statement on the evening of 31 October. He stated that his government's proposals to solve the Constitutional Tribunal crisis had been refused by PiS and Nawrocki. He argued that his supporters in the Sejm had taken a non-confrontational action by waiting for the PiS-appointed judges' terms to expire, and then the Sejm had elected new judges, whom he said qualified as having been legally appointed. In a comment that Euronews interpreted as referring to Nawrocki's 31 October visit to the tribunal building, Tusk asserted that no politicians had the right to enter court buildings, nor give orders to or intimidate judges.

Following the consultations with the president, five parliamentary parties, Razem, Confederation, Development Plus, PSL, and Poland 2050, stated their support for a "reset" of the Constitutional Tribunal, which would entail retiring all the tribunal's judges and electing new ones under a new rule of a three-fifths Sejm majority vote. However, neither Law and Justice and Civic Coalition supported this idea. Mateusz Morawiecki, the leader of Development Plus, announced that he would file a motion of no confidence against the government and proposed a technical government led by Marek Jurek. Krzysztof Bosak of the National Movement proposed shortening the Sejm's current term. However, neither of these proposals are expected to succeed in the Sejm.

On 1 November, Święczkowski attempted to enter the building of the Constitutional Tribunal and tried to persuade the policemen surrounding the building to grant him access. He announced that he would try to enter the tribunal's headquarters every day until success.

On 3 November, the Collegium of the Supreme Court of Poland issued a document criticising the suspension of Święczkowski, stating that it opposed "actions undermining the constitutional principles of running law courts". According to Gazeta Wyborcza, Święczkowski and the six judges who support him would have a "temporary headquarters" in the Supreme Court building, which could result in two self-declared Constitutional Tribunals existing. A split of the tribunal into two along political lines was considered likely by some political scientists, journalists, and politicians. However, Onet reported that only a part of PiS-elected judges were willing to set up a rival tribunal in the Supreme Court, as others were considering reconciling with Korwin-Piotrowska instead.

The same day, the Constitutional Tribunal held a General Assembly which was attended by the eight judges who were elected by the Sejm in 2026. The other judges boycotted the meeting and published a statement describing the suspension of Święczkowski as "completely unlawful" and called for "constitutional bodies of the Republic of Poland and political forces to take immediate and effective actions aimed at resolving the current situation".

Patyra and Korwin-Piotrowska argued that the quorum for an official General Assembly of the tribunal to be valid required two-thirds of the "general number" of judges, and that as Święczkowski and Sochański had been suspended, and Jarosław Wyrembak (elected in 2018) had duplicate judge status, the quorum was two-thirds of twelve, and was thus satisfied. The quorum interpretation was disputed by professor of constitutional law Ryszard Piotrowski and the Supreme Bar Council president Przemysław Rosati; according to Piotrowski, the General Assembly was illegal and Korwin-Piotrowska had no legal basis to exclude Wyrembak as he is a serving judge. Rosati stated that the two-thirds quorum threshold must be calculated from the total number of 15 judges, and that an arbitrary interpretation based on immediate needs is unjustified. According to a law expert Kamil Stępień, suspending Święczkowski and Sochański "does not result in the termination of their status as judges" and thus "does not automatically reduce the quorum threshold".

During the 3 November General Assembly, the judges adopted a resolution on the Constitutional Tribunal's draft budget for 2027, calling for the Sejm to allocate a budget for the tribunal. Korwin-Piotrowska proposed that she be excluded from selection for the disciplinary committees for Święczkowski and Sochański; her proposal was rejected. The members of the two disciplinary committees were selected: Bentkowska (head), Taborowski, Markiewicz, and spokesperson Stanisław Piotrowicz for Święczkowski; and Berek (head), Korwin-Piotrowska, Rafał Wojciechowski, and spokesperson Szostek for Sochański. Korwin-Piotrowska announced that the next General Assembly was scheduled for 10 November.

On 10 November, the tribunal held another General Assembly, in which the judges introduced changes to the tribunal's rules of procedure. One new rule is that the president of the Constitutional Tribunal needs to obtain the General Assembly's approval for the tribunal's budget to be approved. Previously, the tribunal president decided on the budget alone, and was only required to inform other judges about the budget. The general intention of the changes was that the tribunal president should be the "first among mutually equal judges". The changes went into force the following day. On the same day, the Professional Responsibility Chamber of the Supreme Court, headed by judge Maria Szczepaniec, issued a ruling that Korwin-Piotrowska's suspension of Święczkowski and Sochański was invalid. Korwin-Piotrowska stated that on the question of "media reports" about a "possible" Supreme Court Professional Responsibility Chamber ruling, such a ruling would not affect the Constitutional Tribunal; she stated that only the Constitutional Tribunal's disciplinary court can review suspensions of the tribunal's judges. Korwin-Piotrowska stated that the suspension of the two judges would be considered by the previously selected disciplinary committees on 19 and 20 November.

On 13 November, Korwin-Piotrowska stated that the tribunal judges had started work on 100 of the oldest pending cases, with submission dates ranging from 2013 to 2021. She stated that in many cases, no action had been taken by the tribunal for almost seven years. She stated that the General Prosecutor's request to lift Świeczkowski's immunity was refused by the tribunal due to formal errors. Donald Tusk stated that the decisions of the 10 November General Assembly would be published in Monitor Polski.

The tribunal held another General Assembly on 17 November. In response to requests that had been submitted by the General Prosecutor, the tribunal decided to suspend Święczkowski indefinitely and lower his pay in relation to allegations of criminal responsibility in relation to workers' rights, alleged overuse of his powers, and alleged failure to carry out his obligations as head of the tribunal. The tribunal refused the request for Święczkowski to be temporarily detained.

== Protests ==
Several hundred protesters gathered outside the secured grounds of the tribunal in opposition to the suspension. Some breached the court's fence while others threw objects at police, with three people being detained. Several protesters shouted "Tusk traitor", while others prayed with rosaries and Catholic religious images.

On the night of 30 October, there were scuffles between the protesters and policemen. The main gate outside the Constitutional Tribunal's building was forcibly opened by protesters with the use of grinding wheel, but no protester managed to break into the building. Four protesters were detained – three were charged with jumping over the fence and breaking into the tribunal's grounds, while one person was detained for insulting a police officer.

The protests continued on 31 October; according to Onet, they were calmer than the night before, and fewer police officers were present. According to Wirtualna Polska, most of the protesters were elderly people carrying Polish flags. One person was detained for assaulting one of the protesters; he wore a balaclava and attacked a female protester when asked to reveal his face. He was found to be in possession of a knife, a pellet gun, and drugs.

According to Rzeczpospolita, since the night of 31 October, there have been no incidents or police interventions in front of the tribunal.

On 3 November, the protests before the Constitutional Tribunal's building again intensified given the General Assembly of the tribunal that took place on that day; the number of both police and protesters sharply increased. On the same day, Korwin-Piotrowska issued a request to the Warsaw's Chief of Police asking him that the police clears the gates to the building of protesters, arguing that the protesters' conduct was a "significant security threat" and against the law. The police rejected the request, stating that the protests were legal. The same day, the Committee for the Defence of Democracy organized silent protests in major Polish cities, declaring their opposition to the crisis regarding the Constitutional Tribunal and expressing support for its judges.

On 7 November, the leader of Law and Justice Jarosław Kaczyński appealed for suspending the protests on 8 and 9 November in light of the 2026 Kraków shooting.

== Investigations ==
The Polish National Public Prosecutor's Office opened an investigation into a suspected assault by "some people" on Korwin-Piotrowska and Markiewicz that allegedly violated their bodily integrity, during the events of the night of 30 to 31 October when Nawrocki entered the tribunal grounds and building. The investigation is in relation to laws about the bodily integrity of public servants and the use of force to influence the Constitutional Tribunal. The maximum penalty for an assault on a judge is 10 years of imprisonment.

On 3 November, disciplinary investigation was started against Jacek Łukasik, a police officer and the head of the Police Solidarity trade union, for failing to comply with professional ethics rules; he was not suspended from duty. The investigation was caused by Łukasik issuing a letter to Chief of Police Marek Boronia, in which he stated that the police action to secure the Constitutonal Tribunal "has significantly undermined morale amongst police officers". According to Łukasik, many police officers raised concerns over the legality of the action, and are concerned about the police being drawn into political conflicts; he also complained about many officers deployed to the Constitutional Tribunal being young and inexperienced, and called on to Boronia to take "an unambiguous stance" on the situation.

On 5 November, the police filed a criminal complaint with the National Public Prosecutor's Office regarding the alleged defamation of Deputy Chief of Police Tomasz Michułka. The complaint concerned online posts alleging that Michułka had ordered officers to use machine guns against tribunal protesters. Police said the order concerned readiness and equipment for a response to possible sabotage near Poland's north-eastern border.

== Reactions ==
=== Politicians and ambassadors ===
==== Supporters ====
Prime Minister of Poland Donald Tusk posted on his X account that the government was obliged to restore the rule of law, calling the process difficult but unavoidable after "years of lawlessness under PiS".

Deputy Prime Minister Krzysztof Gawkowski of the New Left party declared his support for the intervention on social media.

The government's actions were endorsed by former president Lech Wałęsa, who wrote on his social media that he stands with Tusk "regardless of the circumstances".

==== Opposition ====
President of Poland Karol Nawrocki, who was flying to Senegal, returned to Poland. The Constitutional Tribunal's X account stated that everyone who was involved with the interventions was "committing the crime of a coup d'état".

PiS leader Jarosław Kaczyński accused the government of staging a coup against the tribunal. Former Minister of Justice Zbigniew Ziobro denounced the suspension as a "blatant, criminal attack" on the constitutional order, and called for resistance. Politicians of the right-wing populist party Confederation, including Sławomir Mentzen and Krzysztof Bosak, protested outside the Constitutional Tribunal in response to the suspension.

Deputy Marshal of the Sejm Marcin Horała from Development Plus stated that Korwin-Piotrowska's actions are illegal, arguing that she is in no legal position as one of many judges of the Constitutional Tribunal to suspend the body's president and vice-president, and that even if they had been properly removed, the most senior judge, Wojciech Sych, would have become the new president.

The Polish ambassador to China, Jakub Kumoch, resigned from his position in response to "the events". The Polish ambassador to Romania, Paweł Soloch, also resigned from his position, stating he does not see the possibility to continue his service "due to the attempted illegal takeover of the Constitutional Tribunal". On 2 November, Krzysztof Szczerski, the Polish ambassador to the United Nations, also resigned for reasons related to the Constitutional Tribunal.

Leszek Miller, the Prime Minister of Poland between 2001 and 2004, stated that Korwin-Piotrowska had no legal basis to take over the leadership of the Constitutional Tribunal, arguing that "a law that ceases to apply when 'something must be done' ceases to be a law."

==== Mixed stances ====
Szymon Hołownia, the leader of Poland 2050, has stated that while "Bogdan Święczkowski, together with PiS nominees, has turned the Constitutional Tribunal into a caricature of a constitutional court", the government's decision to suspend Święczkowski by force "only kills the patient" and "deepens the decline of the Tribunal". He stated that the government's action "brings shame to Poland" and called for the president and prime minister to enter negotiations and work out a compromise on the Constitutional Tribunal.

Anna Maria Żukowska, the leader of The Left's parliamentary group, stated that "the rule of law is not restored by force" and that "force can only provoke a reaction from another force". She argued that in its current form, the tribunal does not serve Polish citizens but only those in power, as it "will always be flawed and doomed to political torment" because "either some will not recognise and publish its judgments, or others will". At the same time, she argued that President Nawrocki bears responsibility for the tribunal's dysfunction.

Adrian Zandberg, leader of the left-wing opposition party Together, warned that the escalating conflict could further paralyse the state and spark violence, calling for a cross-party agreement in what he described as a "constitutional reset".

=== Academia and human rights organisations ===
==== Supporters ====
Four former presidents of the Constitutional Tribunal, Marek Safjan, Jerzy Stępień, Bohdan Zdziennicki, and Andrzej Zoll wrote a joint letter in which they praised Korwin-Piotrowska for "necessary steps to restore the function and status of this systemic institution".

==== Opposition ====
Ryszard J. Piotrowski, a legal scholar of the University of Warsaw, criticised Święczkowski's suspension and takeover of the Constitutional Tribunal's building as "a clear violation of the constitution, a clear violation of the law and a clear attack on a constitutional body of the state". He accused the government of undermining the authority of the tribunal by refusing to publish its rulings in Dziennik Ustaw.

Piotr Uziębło, a legal scholar of the University of Gdańsk, expressed doubts about the legal basis for suspending Święczkowski, and said that "even violations within the Tribunal do not allow for taking action in this way".

Marcin Matczak, a legal scholar of the University of Warsaw, argued that there was no legal basis to suspend Święczkowski, stating that Żurek was not legally allowed to suspend the president of the tribunal, because while the Minister of Justice supervises ordinary courts, the Constitutional Tribunal is explicitly excluded from the minister's authority. He stated that "the suspension of the President of the Constitutional Tribunal by the Minister of Justice is therefore an act that directly violates five provisions of the Constitution", and that he wishes the government "luck when the government changes and the new Ziobro starts to exploit this precedent against the President and judges of the Constitutional Tribunal".

Marcin Wiącek, professor of law at the University of Warsaw, argued that there is no legal basis for suspending Święczkowski, noting that the "state of higher constitutional necessity" invoked by Korwin-Piotrowska "is not provided for in the provisions of Polish law." He also stated that the invoked Article 130, which allows for the removal of a judge from duties for a month, could apply to tribunal judges but "does not provide a basis for ordering a recess in the duties of the President of the Constitutional Tribunal". Wiącek added that the government's "overinterpretation" of the law deepened divisions and created dangerous precedents for future governments.

Bartosz Lewandowski, the rector of Collegium Intermarium, member of Ordo Iuris, and lawyer for PiS politicians, stated that "even lawyers who have so far been largely sympathetic to the government are now saying: there was no legal basis for Ms. Anna Korwin-Piotrowska to suddenly remove President Święczkowski from his duties", and described suspending Święczkowski as "an act of anti-constitutional coup against one of the constitutional bodies, aimed at furthering the political interests of the group currently ruling Poland".

Jacek Zaleśny, professor of constitutional law at the University of Warsaw, stated that "the actions taken against the President and Vice-President of the Constitutional Tribunal have no legal basis", and that "no law provides for the construction referred to by Anna Korwin-Piotrowska" in her letter ordering the suspension of Święczkowski.

==== Mixed stances ====
Antoni Dudek, a political scientist and historian at Cardinal Stefan Wyszyński University, argued that the takeover of the Constitutional Tribunal by the KO-led government does not end the constitutional crisis, but deepens it. He stated that "simply put, the administration of the palace on Szucha Street in Warsaw will change, and nothing more", and that once the government changes, Święczkowski's suspension "will serve as the basis for holding the current cabinet accountable". According to Dudek, the solution would have been an agreement between all major political parties on the composition and legitimacy of the tribunal.

Ewa Łętowska, a legal scholar of the Institute of Law of the Polish Academy of Sciences, said that the situation was not anticipated by the statutes governing the tribunal and its judges and that the legality of the suspension required assessment under several interacting provisions. She said that the tribunal in its current form would probably never regain its authority.

Maciej Gutowski, a legal scholar at the Adam Mickiewicz University in Poznań, stated that he assessed the situation with "sadness, fear, and rather pessimism", and that "nothing good will come of this". He argued that while the United Right was hitherto responsible for the constitutional crisis, the suspension of Święczkowski worsened the crisis and the government's actions ended up "harming the constitutional court under the banner of the rule of law and causing a complete crisis of recognition". He stated that the government should have sought to limit the conflict instead of escalating it, and accused it of nominating political allies as judges instead of "the most outstanding constitutionalists, unaffected by serving on government benches".

Lawyer Krzysztof Izdebski of the Stefan Batory Foundation stated that "no one is 100% right" in the conflict, but that "being right also is not crucial". He argued that suspending Święczkowski "will not lead to a situation in which the Constitutional Tribunal will perform its duties in a neutral manner" and escalates the perception of the Constitutional Tribunal as a politicised, biased institution.

Supreme Court judge and former head of the Labor and Insurance Chamber, Piotr Prusinowski, stated that while Korwin-Piotrowska does not act within the bounds of law, he understands her actions. According to Prusinowski, the legality of Korwin-Piotrowska's actions is "highly debatable", and that while he believes that Korwin-Piotrowska could not have taken such measures from a strictly legal point, the context of her actions opens the question on whether there was any other way to solve the situation, given that "over the past 10 years, politicians have trampled on what is known as the Constitutional Tribunal".

The Helsinki Foundation for Human Rights (HFHR) Board and Council stated opposing views on the events. The HFHR Board described the suspension of Święczkowski as a "dangerous precedent" and argued that it sees no "clear legal basis for such a decision to be issued by the longest-serving judge". It also stated that Korwin-Piotrowska's invocation of "a state of higher constitutional necessity" is "tantamount to admitting that there is no unquestionable legal basis". On 2 November, Hanna Machińska stated that the HFHR Council disagreed with the statements by the HFHR Board, that the board had been unwilling to work with the council in the context of the tribunal crisis, and that the council believed that the legal basis for Korwin-Piotrowska's actions was clearly defined. Machińska and five other members of the HFHR Council resigned from the council in protest.

Kamil Stępniak, described as the "most popular constitutional law expert on Polish social media" by NaTemat, argues that while Święczkowski's actions raise "far-reaching legal doubts", he invariably remains the president of the tribunal. According to Stępniak, the Article 130 invoked by Korwin-Piotrowska to suspend Święczkowski applies to ordinary courts and cannot be applied to the tribunal, as the Article 19 of the law on the status of tribunal judges stipulates that in case of any issue not explicitly addressed by this law, the law of the Supreme Court of Poland judges should be applied, which, according to Stępniak, does not allow for suspension of the president in such a manner. At the same time, Stępniak questions Nawrocki's refusal to swear in judges, and argues that the Sejm swearing them in in the absence of the President was legally valid.

=== Others ===
Polish online analytics foundation Res Futura analysed internet traffic on social media platforms from the night of 30–31 October, finding that the opposition (most notably Karol Nawrocki) generated the highest volume of engagement regarding the events. While the governing coalition maintained a share of the digital outreach, it failed to build a narrative outside its own localised base. This digital deficit, however, did not benefit the Law and Justice party. Instead, Res Futura argues that the far-right Confederation captured the online momentum. Following Donald Tusk's speech in the aftermath of the standoff, Res Futura stated that the vast majority of responses on X were hostile towards Tusk, heavily driven by both "coordinated groups" and foreign accounts setting a "coup d'état" narrative.

==== Public opinion ====
An IBRiS poll for Rzeczpospolita conducted prior to the escalation on 16–17 October estimated that 32% of Poles believed president Nawrocki was in the right (regarding the appointments to the constitutional tribunal), while 27.8% believed the same of prime minister Tusk. Of the rest 32.7% chose neither, and 7.5% were unsure. A United Surveys by IBRiS for Wirtualna Polska conducted after the standoff on 2 November regarding the Constitutional Tribunal crisis estimated that 28.7% of Poles believed that president Nawrocki is right in this conflict, while 26.6% believed that prime minister Tusk and his government are right instead. The largest percentage of respondents, 38.6%, stated that neither side is right, while 6.1% had no opinion.

A poll by Europion Polska for Onet conducted on 1–2 November estimated that 30% of Poles supported the eight judges elected by the Sejm, 21% supported Święczkowski, 25% supported neither side, while 24% were unsure. The poll also found that the Sejm-elected judges were supported by 72% of Civic Coalition's voters, and by relative majorities of The Left (45% supported the judges, 8% supported Święczkowski, and 31% supported neither) and Third Way voters (34% supported the judges, 19% supported Święczkowski, and 27% supported neither). Amongst the surveyed non-voters, 44% declared support for neither side, while 9% supported the judges and 10% supported Święczkowski. Among Confederation and PiS voters, support for Święczkowski was 47% and 44%, respectively.

A United Surveys poll for Wirtualna Polska conducted on 2 November asked respondents to name "who currently directs the work of the Constitutional Tribunal as its president". The survey found that 40.3% stated it was Korwin-Piotrowska, 24.2% named Święczkowski, while 32.2% picked the "I don't know/hard to say" option. A marginal percentage said that it was someone else (2.4%), while 0.6% and 0.3% named Krystyna Pawłowicz and Julia Przyłębska respectively. The same poll found that 50.0% of respondents believed Święczkowski should step aside as the chair of the institution, while 34.4% believed otherwise. The poll also indicated that 77.8% of respondents believed the crisis would harm the international image of Poland and the Tribunal, while 12.8% believed otherwise.

An SW Research poll for Onet conducted on 3–4 November estimated that 37.3% of Poles supported Nawrocki's entry into the Constitutional Tribunal building, while 41.9% opposed it and 12.5% saw it neutrally. Another SW Research poll for Onet conducted in the same time period estimated that 47.8% of Poles believed that the actions of the Donald Tusk's government towards the Constitutional Tribunal had no legal basis, while 33.1% believed its actions were legal, and 19.1% had no opinion.

An SW Research poll for Rzeczpospolita conducted on 2–4 November found that 39.3% of respondents believed Nawrocki's approval would rise due to the crisis escalation, while 31.3% believed it would decline and 15.6% believed it would stay the same. In the same poll, 39.2% of respondents stated that the escalation would affect who they vote for, while 46.0% stated it would not.

An Opinia24 poll for RMF FM conducted on 2–4 November found that to resolve the crisis, 30% of respondents desired a total reform of the Constitutional Tribunal and reselection of all of its judges, 19% supported the retention of Korwin-Piotrowska, 12% supported the restoration of Święczkowski, 9% supported dissolution of the Constitutional Tribunal and 4% believed in a different option.

An SW Research poll for Wprost conducted in November found that 58.5% of respondents wanted Nawrocki and Tusk to meet in hopes of resolving the crisis, while 6.4% thought otherwise and 27.6% believed that such a meeting would not have any effect on ending the crisis.

A United Surveys poll for Wirtualna Polska conducted on 6–9 November found that in regards to the idea of a "Constitutional Reset" as proposed by the Polish People's Party—a removal of all incumbent Constitutional Tribunal judges and their reselection by a constitutional majority in the Sejm—44.2% of respondents supported such a solution and 47.7% opposed it. The solution was supported by 33% of government sympathisers and 51% of opposition sympathisers. In regards to abolishing the Constitutional Tribunal altogether, 26.5% supported such a solution, while 65.6% opposed it.

| Date(s) conducted | Polling firm/Link | Sample size | Government (Note: Polling options vary, also seen as Prime Minister and/or Donald Tusk's judges or Sejm-elected judges.) (Korwin‑Piotrowska) | Opposition (Note: Polling options vary, also seen as President and/or Karol Nawrocki's judges.) (Święczkowski) | Neither | Don't know/Neutral | Net approval (Note: Net approval for government's actions surrounding the Constitutional Tribunal.) |
|---|---|---|---|---|---|---|---|
| 3–4 Nov 2026 | SW Research / Onet | 803 | 33.1 | 47.8 | – | 19.1 | –14.7 |
| 2 November 2026 | IBRiS / WP.pl | 1,000 | 26.6 | 28.7 | 38.6 | 6.1 | –2.1 |
| 1–2 Nov 2026 | Europion Polska / Onet | 1,134 | 30 | 21 | 25 | 24 | 9 |
Suspension of Święczkowski; Constitutional Tribunal crisis escalates
| 21–22 Oct 2026 | IPSOS / TVP Info | 1,000 | 40 | 25 | 10 | 25 | 15 |
| 16–18 Oct 2026 | United Surveys / WP.pl | 1,000 | 50.4 | 40.0 | – | 9.6 | 10.4 |
| 16–17 Oct 2026 | IBRiS / Rz | 1,068 | 27.8 | 32.0 | 32.7 | 7.5 | –4.2 |
| 10–12 Apr 2026 | IBRiS / WP.pl | 1,000 | 43.9 | 42.2 | – | 13.9 | 1.7 |
| 10–11 Apr 2026 | IBRiS / Rz (Note: The question asked "Kto ponosi odpowiedzialność za eskalację konfliktu wokół Trybunału Konstytucyjnego?" ("Who is responsible for the escalation of the conflict surrounding the Constitutional Tribunal?"). Accordingly with the rest of the table, respondents who blamed the opposition were classified under the government column, while those who blamed the government were classified under the opposition column. Respondents who blamed all sides equally were classified under neither.) | 1,074 | 37.9 | 26.1 | 25.3 | 10.6 | 11.8 |

== See also ==
- Democratic backsliding
- Democratic resilience
- Polish constitutional crisis
- Protests against Polish judiciary reforms
