= Bartłomiej Sochański =

Polish politician, judge and lawyer (born 1955)

Deputy chairperson of the Constitutional Tribunal of Poland
- Incumbent
- Assumed office 21 February 2025
- Preceded by: Stanisław Biernat; Mariusz Muszyński

Judge of the Constitutional Tribunal of Poland
- Incumbent
- Assumed office 9 April 2020

Member of the Szczecin City Council
- In office 22 November 2018 – 6 June 2020; 22 March 1990 – 5 July 1994; 18 November 1998 – 11 October 2002
- Constituency: No. 4 (2018–2020)

Mayor of Szczecin
- In office 5 July 1994 – 18 November 1998
- Preceded by: Władysław Lisewski
- Succeeded by: Marian Jurczyk

Personal details
- Born: 11 February 1955 Szczecin, Poland
- Party: Law and Justice (2017–2020); Initiative for Poland (2004); Freedom Union (1994–2001); Liberal Democratic Congress (1991–1994)
- Education: Adam Mickiewicz University
- Occupation: Politician, judge, lawyer

Bartłomiej Julian Sochański (Polish: [bartˈwɔ.mjɛj ˈju.ljan sɔˈxaɲ.ski]; born 11 February 1955) is a Polish politician, judge, and lawyer. Since 9 April 2020, he is a judge of the Constitutional Tribunal of Poland, and since 21 February 2025, he serves as its deputy chairperson. Previously, Sochański was the mayor of the city of Szczecin in West Pomeranian Voivodeship, Poland, serving from 5 July 1994 to 18 November 1998. He was also a councillor in Szczecin, serving from 1990 to 1994, from 1998 to 2002, and from 2018 to 2020. Asside from his political career, Sochański was also a practicing lawyer. On 30 October 2026, he was suspended from performing the duties of the deputy chairperson of the Constitutional Tribunal for a duration of one month, in a political incident continuing the ongoing rule-of-law crisis in Poland.

== Early life and education ==
Bartłomiej Sochański was born on 11 February 1955 in the city of Szczecin, located in West Pomeranian Voivodeship, Poland. He finished the Adam Asnyk 5th General Education Secondary School in Szczecin, and in 1977, he graduated with a law degree from the Adam Mickiewicz University in Poznań.

== Dissident activity ==
Sochański was an academic lecturer in the Higher School of Pedagogy in Szczecin from 1978 to 1979, and worked in the Marine Fisheries Institute in Gdynia from 1979 to 1981. In September 1980, he joined the Solidarity trade union, later becoming a chairperson of its division in his place of employment. Following the implementation of the Martial law in Poland in 1981, Sochański led a protest committee in his trade union division, and participated in a protest at the Szczecin Shipyard. Later that year, he was fired from his job, for his participation in the protest activities. From 1982 to 1985, Sochański was a member of the Bishopric Legal Advice Centre of the Holy Family Church in Szczecin, where he provided legal assistance to the activists of the anti-government dissident movement in Poland, who were persecuted by the state.

From 1982 to 1989, Sochański was also a distributor of underground press, and wrote for newspapers Veto in Poznań in 1982, and Obraz in Szczecin from 1983 to 1986. In 1987, he was a legal advisor of a dissident group supporting activist Marian Jurczyk. The same year, Sochański was interrogated and had his apartment searched by the officers of the Security Service, who attempted to convince him to co-operation with the secret police.

From 1989 to 1991, Sochański was a member of the Citizens’ Consultative Committee of Szczecin Land, an organisation of the Solidarity trade union, tasked with the preparation for the organisation of parliamentary elections in Szczecin Voivodeship, amides the negotiations of the Polish Round Table Agreement. He was also a member of its council from 1990 to 1991.

== Lawyer career ==
From 1981 to 1987, Sochański was a jurist working for the Dąb Szczecin Housing Cooperative, the Gryfia Maritime Repair Shipyard in Szczecin, and the Wspólny Dom Housing Cooperative in Szczecin. He was a deputy senior counsel in the District Chamber of Legal Advisers in Szczecin from 1983 to 1987, later praciing law as a lawyer, being based in Gryfice from 1987 to 1989, and Szczecin from 1989 to 1991. Afterwards, from 1999 to 2005, Sochański run his own law firm, and since 2006, is the co-owner of the law firm Kancelarię Sochański i Manik Adwokaci. He is specialised in the corporate criminal law, the European Union law, the international human rights law, and the white-collar criminal law. Sochański also practiced law in Canada, Denmark, and the United Kingdom. Among others, he was an attoryen-in-fact of the families of the victims of the Katyn massacre, represented by the Katyn Families Federation, against the Russian Federation in the European Court of Human Rights in Strasbourg, France in 2012.

== Political career ==
In the 1990 election, Sochański was chosen to a seat the city council in Szczecin, where from 1990 to 1991, he was the deputy chairperson of the council. He was reelected in 1994, and the same year, he was elected from among the councilors to the office of the mayor of Szczecin, serving from 5 July 1994 to 18 November 1998. Afterwards, he was again reelected to the city council in 1998, serving until 2002. Sochański was a member of the Liberal Democratic Congress from 1991 to 1994, and of the Freedom Union from 1994 to 2001. He was a member of the latter's state council.

In the 2004 election, he unsuccessfully run for a seat in the European Parliament, from the constituency no. 13, consisting of the Lubusz and West Pomeranian Voivodeships. He was a candidate of the Initiative for Poland, and received 2,187 (0.59%). In 2009, he joined the association Szczecin 21, a division of the Poland 21 Citizen Movement, a Christian democratic and censervative liberal political association. In the 2010 election, he unsuccessfully run for the office of the mayor of Szczecin, represented by the electoral committee Let's Wake Up Szczecin, which he founded. He revised 13,740 votes (11.65%). Additionally, he also unsuccessfully run for a seat in the Szczecin City Council from the constitunecy no. 3, receiving 1,300 votes (7.2%). In 2017, he joined the Law and Justice party, and in the 2018 election, he unsuccessfully run for the office of the mayor of Szczecin, receiving 34,005 votes (21.99%) in the first round, and 27,966 votes (21.78%) in the second round, losing to the incumbent Piotr Krzystek. He simultaneously run for a seat in the Szczecin City Council, from the contingency no. 4, being elected with 5,245 votes (15.95%), and serving until 2020.

From 1996 and 1999, Sochański was also a deputy chairperson of the Union of the Baltic Cities and the deputy president of the Association of European Border Regions. From 2001 to 2018, he was an honourary consul of Germany in Szczecin. Sochański was also an city security expert employed by the Council of Europe.

== Judicial career ==
On 6 April 2020, Sochański was chosen by the Sejm of Poland to become a judge of the Constitutional Tribunal. He was sworn in and begun serving a six-year-long term on 9 April 2020. Sochański was appointed as the deputy chairperson of the Constitutional Tribunal on 21 February 2025.

On 22 October 2020, he was in an adjudicating panel of Constitutional Tribunal, in which, it ruled that performing abortion due to severe and irreversible fetal impairment or incurable life-threatening disease was incompatible with the Constitution of Poland. A team of experts led by Marek Chmaja negatively assessed the decision in terms of both procedure and substance. The decision has caused a series of protests in Poland against the stricter abortion laws.

On 30 October 2026, Anna Korwin-Piotrowska, as the most senior member of the Constitutional Tribunal, suspended its chairperson Bogdan Święczkowski and deputy chairperson Sochański, from performing the duties of the office for a duration of one month. Among the reasons cited for the orders were the obstruction of swearing-in of the judges chosen in 2026, as well as concerns regarding the organisation of the work of the Constitutional Tribunal. The event have triggered a political incident between Prime Minister Donald Tusk's pro-European Union government and the right-wing, nationalist party Law and Justice over control of the judiciary in the country, continuing the ongoing rule-of-law crisis in Poland. The same day, Sochański was denied the entry into the building of the Constitutional Tribunal, and have described the situation as the "attack on the independence of the judiciary branch".

== Personal life ==
Sochański has a wife and three children. He identifies as a Christian.

On 11 July 2003, Sochański, who had practiced high diving in his youth, jumped from the Bridge of the Pioneers of the City of Szczecin into the Regalica river, from the height of 12 m (39.37 ft). He has done so a day before its official opening, fullfilling a promise he has made five years ealier as the mayor. The jump was condemned by the local police department, which following its announcement, declared intention to prevent the stunt, due to which Sochański discretly moved the event one day earlier.

== Orders and decorations ==
- Gold Cross of Merit (2004)
- Patron of Culture of Szczecin (2004)
- Silver Commemorative Medal of the Minister of Justice (2010)

== Awards and nominations ==
- Nomination to the 2006 Bona Lex award by Gazeta Prawna for the best lawyer (2007)

== Electoral results ==
Year	Office		Party	Constituency	Primary			Secondary			Result	Ref.
Year	Office		Party	Constituency	Total	%	P.	Total	%	P.	Result	Ref.
1990	Szczecin City Council	1st	No data					—N/a			Won	
1994	Szczecin City Council	2nd	Freedom Union	No data				—N/a			Won	
1998	Szczecin City Council	3rd	Freedom Union	No data				—N/a			Won	
2004	European Parliament	6th	Initiative for Poland	No. 13	2,187	0.59	45th	—N/a			Lost	
2010	Mayor of Szczecin	10th	Bartłomiej Sochański's Electors'; Electoral Committee Let's Wake Up Szczecin	—N/a	13,740	11.65	4th	—N/a			Lost	
2010	Szczecin City Council	6th	Bartłomiej Sochański's Electors'; Electoral Committee Let's Wake Up Szczecin	No. 3	1,300	7.20	4th	—N/a			Lost	
2018	Mayor of Szczecin	10th	Law and Justice	—N/a	34,005	21.99	2nd	27,966	21.78	2nd	Lost	
2018	Szczecin City Council	8th	Law and Justice	No. 4	5,245	15.95	1st	—N/a			Won	
