= Biruta Lewaszkiewicz-Petrykowska =

Polish lawyer (1927–2022)

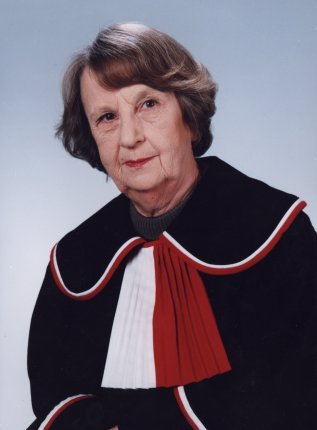

Judge of the Constitutional Tribunal
- In office 1 December 1997 – 1 December 2006

Personal details
- Born: 26 August 1927 Kraków, Poland
- Died: 9 June 2022 (aged 94)
- Education: Jagiellonian University
- Profession: lawyer

Biruta Lewaszkiewicz-Petrykowska (26 August 1927 – 9 June 2022) was a Polish lawyer, Professor of Law, lecturer at the University of Łódź, and judge of the Polish Constitutional Tribunal at rest.

== Biography ==
In 1949, she graduated from the Faculty of Law of the Jagiellonian University, after which she started working at the University of Łódź. She also completed an attorney apprenticeship and practiced in this profession until 1965. In 1959 she obtained a doctorate in law, in 1967 she obtained her habilitation. In 1975 she became an associate professor, in 1987 she received the academic title of professor.

In the years 1973–1978 she was deputy dean, and in the periods 1981–1984 and 1993–1996 she was the dean of the Faculty of Law at the University of Łódź. In the years 1983–1997 she headed the Department of Civil Law at this faculty. She also lectured at the Faculté Internationale de Droit Comparé in Strasbourg, and was a member of scientific legal societies. In her scientific work, she dealt with civil law and comparative legal studies.

In November 1997, the Sejm (on the recommendation of the Solidarity Electoral Action) appointed her to the Constitutional Tribunal. The term of office ended on 1 December 2006.
