= Ewa Siedlecka =

Polish journalist (born 1958)

Ewa Siedlecka (born 1958) is a Polish journalist.

Ewa Siedlecka (2017)

== Career ==
Siedlecka is a graduate of the Helsinki School of Human Rights of the Human Rights Foundation.

In 1989, she began working as a journalist at Gazeta Wyborcza, where she published articles related to human rights, civil society, sexual and religious minorities, people with disabilities and animal rights.

== Awards ==
- 2011: Dariusz Fikus Award for journalism of the highest order for a series of publications about the Constitutional Tribunal.
- 2011: Recognizes for journalistic work for human rights on the occasion of the 50th anniversary of Amnesty International.
- 2017: Press Freedom Award 2016 for a series of publications about the Polish Constitutional Tribunal awarded by the Austrian branch of Reporters Without Borders
- 2017: Priest Józef Tischner Award in the category of journalism or social essays, which teaches Poles to accept the unfortunate gift of freedom (for articles about the Constitutional Tribunal).
- 2018: Distinction of the Polcul Foundation for many years of activity in building civil society in Poland through full of engaging journalistic work; in particular the defense of the rule of law.
