= Constitutional Tribunal (Poland) =

Constitutional court of Poland

Coordinates: 52°12′56″N 21°1′25″E

- Trybunał Konstytucyjny
- Interactive map of Constitutional Tribunal
- Established: 26 March 1982; 44 years ago – constitutional amendment establishing the Tribunal; 1986 – beginning of the activity
- Location: Warsaw, Poland
- Composition method: Sejm's nomination President and Vice President appointed by the President of Poland.
- Authorised by: Constitution of the Republic of Poland
- Judge term length: 9 years, one term only
- Number of positions: 15
- Language: Polish
- Website: trybunal.gov.pl

President

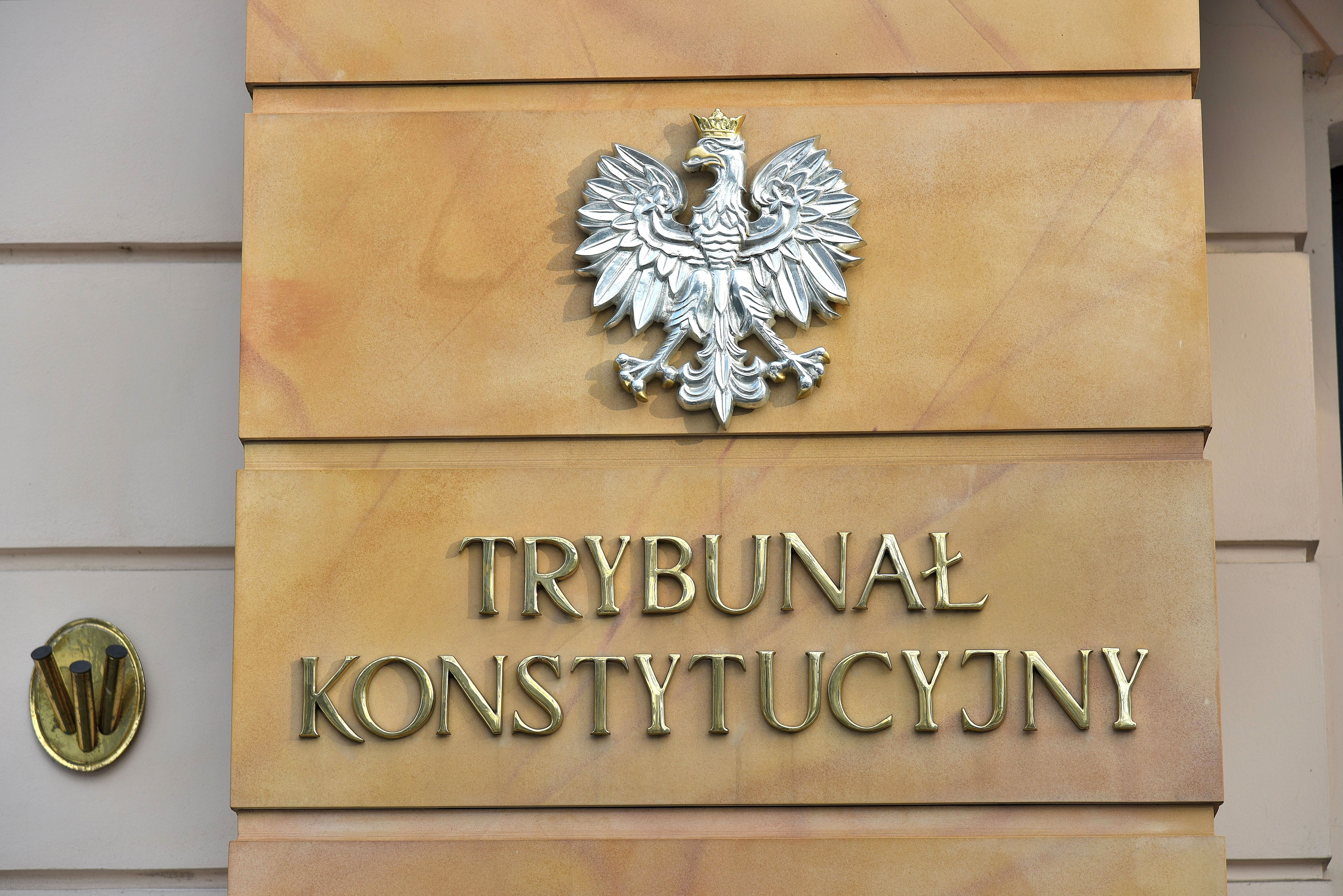
The seat of the Tribunal, Warsaw

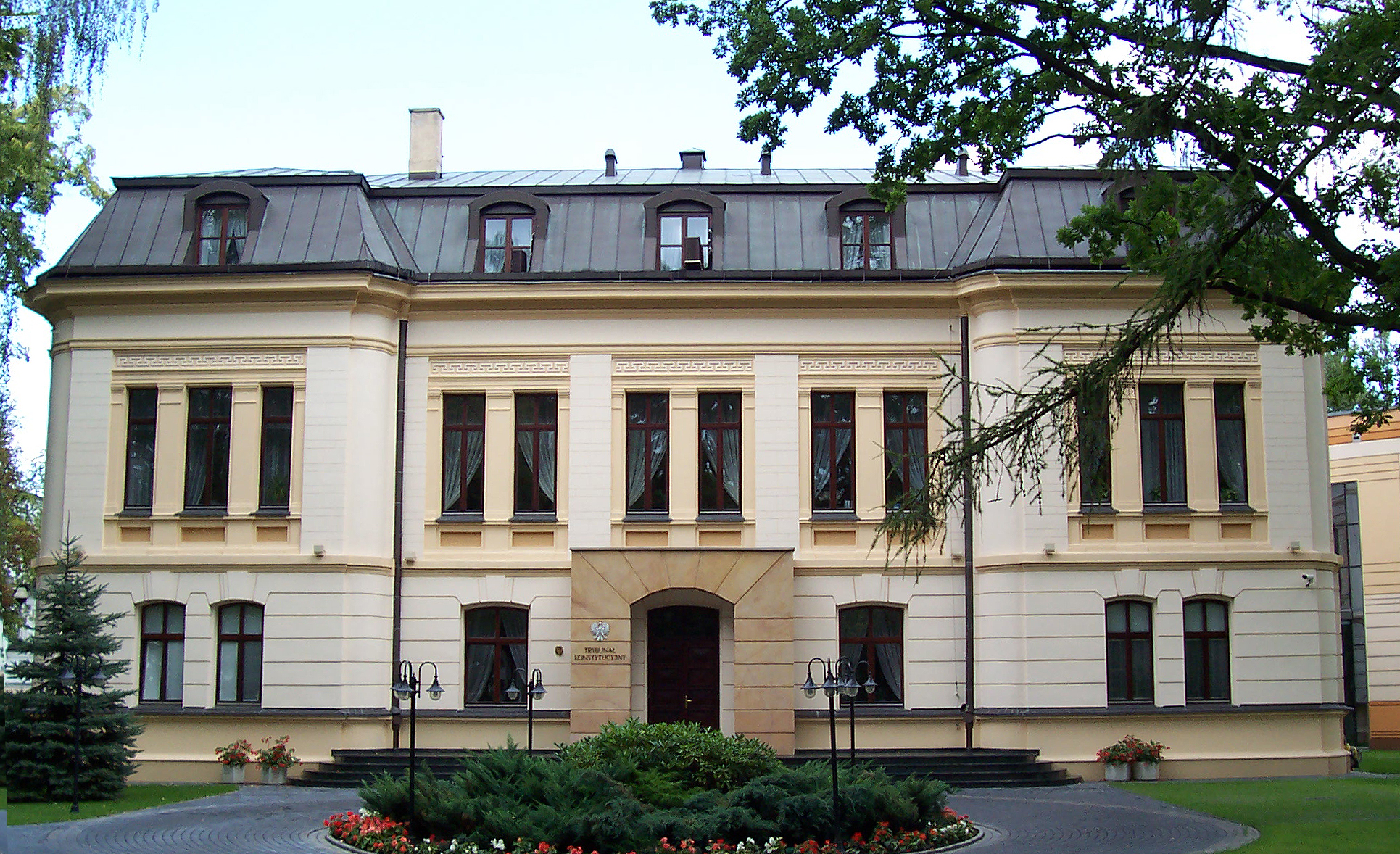
The seat of the Tribunal, Warsaw (2006)

The Constitutional Tribunal (Polish: Trybunał Konstytucyjny [trɘˈbu.naw kɔn.stɘ.tuˈt͡sɘj.nɘ]), according to the Constitution of the Republic of Poland, is the constitutional court of the Republic of Poland.

The Constitution mandates that its 15 members are elected by the Sejm, the lower house, for 9 years. Since 2015, an appointment crisis has been developing and no regularly composed Constitutional Tribunal has existed.

The Constitutional Tribunal should not be confused with the Supreme Court of Poland.

== History ==
=== 1982–1989: People's Republic of Poland ===
The Solidarity movement requested the creation of a constitutional tribunal following its 1981 National Congress that took place a few weeks before the introduction of martial law. The Tribunal was established on 26 March 1982 and judges took office on 1 January 1986.

The Constitutional Tribunal was established by the amendment of the Constitution of the People's Republic of Poland on 26 March 1982. Due to the brevity of the introduced article 33a, it was decided that a law must be brought forth that would outline the proceedings of the Constitutional Tribunal. This became an intricate process with 15 drafts developed, and the final act was ratified by the Sejm on 29 April 1985 which allowed for the formal commencement of the Tribunal's judicial proceedings on 1 January 1986. But the courts competence and judicial capacity were limited at this time, as all rulings on the constitutionality of bills could be dismissed by a 2/3 majority vote in the Sejm. This in effect would place the rulings in an indefinite moratorium as these votes rarely occurred.

On 24 January 1986 the first motion, reference U 1/86, was brought before the Constitutional Tribunal on behalf of the Presidium of the Provincial National Council in Wrocław. The claimants sought to contend two paragraphs of the Ordinance of the Council of Ministers in regard to the sale of state property and the procedures and costs related to it as unconstitutional. In opposition to the government's stance, the court ruled in a 3-member panel on 28 May 1986 that the introduced paragraphs were unconstitutional. The Council of Ministers called for a reevaluation of the case, but on 5 November 1986 the Constitutional Tribunal upheld its ruling.

=== 1989–2014: Third Polish Republic ===
In 1989 the Constitutional Tribunal's powers expanded as it secured the right to universally decide on the binding interpretation of laws. Many changes came with the enactment of the 1997 Constitution; the number of judges increased from 12 to 15, terms of office were elongated by 1 year for a total of 9 years, and the Tribunal lost its competence to decide the interpretation of legal statutes (in the form of abstract provisions).

=== Polish Constitutional Tribunal crisis ===
==== 2015–2016: start of PiS government ====
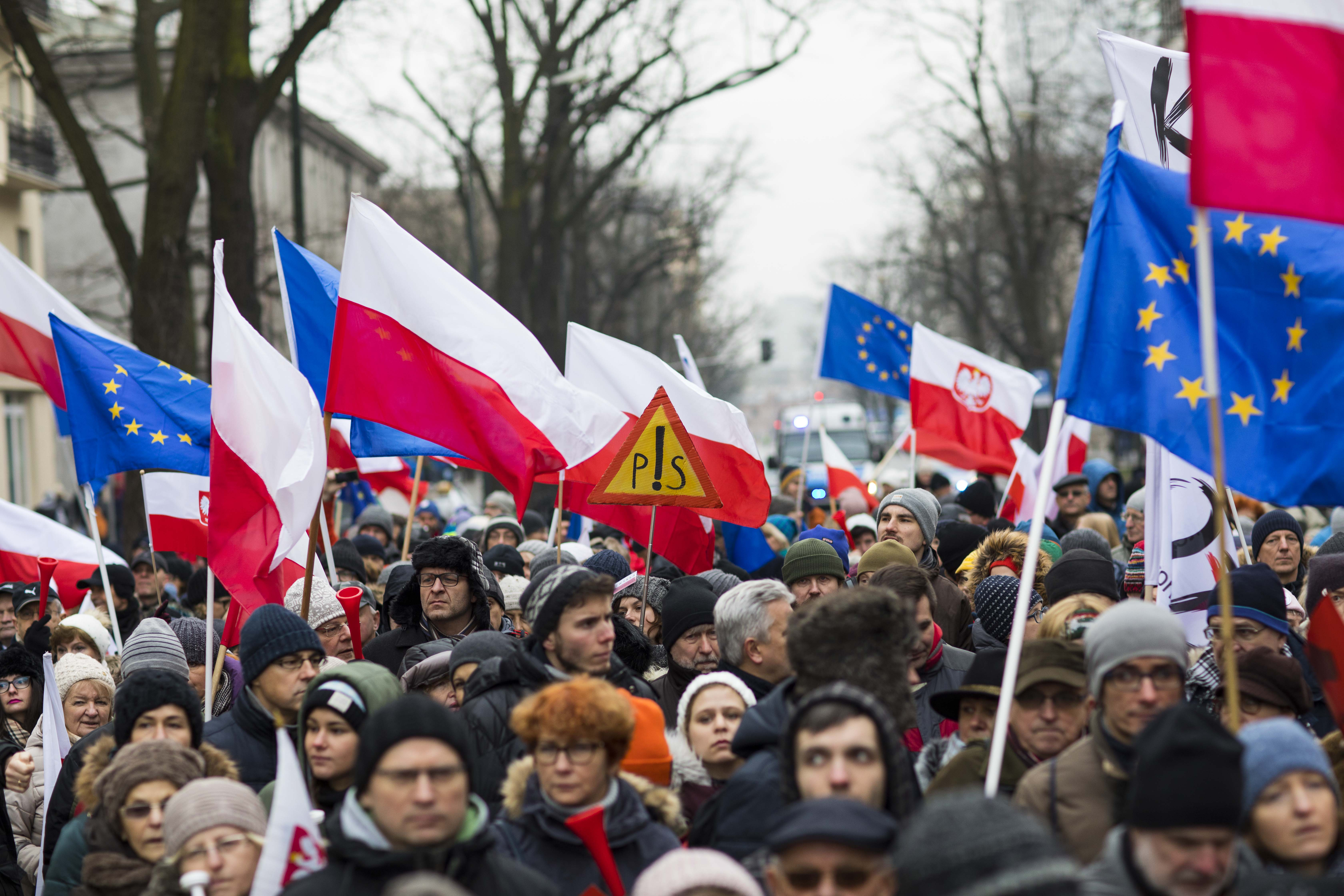
Demonstration organized by the KOD, 18 December 2016

After losing the presidential election in May 2015, the governing Civic Platform (Platforma Obywatelska, PO) helped to change article 133 of the law of the constitutional court to be able to elect judges in advance. Later on the 25 October parliamentary election the Law and Justice party (Prawo i Sprawiedliwość, PiS), got an absolute majority in the Sejm.

Before the new president of Poland, Andrzej Duda, assumed office on 6 August 2015, and the new (eighth) Sejm was seated on 12 November 2015, the PO majority attempted to elect enough judges so that the judicial branch would not quickly fall under the control of PiS.

In 2015, 5 of the 15 seats were due to be replaced. Three terms were due to end during the Sejm's recess (after the election but before the eighth Sejm was seated on 12 November). Two others were due for early December.

PO attempted to nominate all five seats in advance. In June 2015, they enacted a provision in which it sought to transfer such power to the Sejm. Then on 8 October 2015, two weeks before the election, the Sejm elected these 5 judges (Roman Hauser, Krzysztof Ślebzak, Andrzej Jakubecki, Bronisław Sitek and Andrzej Sokala). The new President Duda refused to let any of them take their oaths of office. After PiS won the elections and a majority of seats, they nominated a different set of five judges who were immediately sworn in.

A fierce partisan struggle ensued. The remaining judges in the Tribunal, most of which had been nominated by PO majorities, ruled out 3 of the 5 PiS nominees, validating instead 3 PO nominees, with the 3 PiS judges sworn in not allowed to hear cases. The validated PiS judges were Piotr Pszczółkowski and Julia Przyłębska; the invalidated appointments were Henryk Cioch, Lech Morawski and Mariusz Muszyński. This ruling was finally upheld by the CJEU in 2025.

The PiS majority immediately passed a new law purporting to force the inclusion of its nominees, sparking protests and foreign statements of either hostility or support. As this was not enough, a total of 6 "remedial bills" devised by PiS were enacted in the 2015-2016 period. A two-thirds majority was instated, with the stated purpose of diluting partisan influence. Finally, the term of resisting President Rzepliński ended and on 21 December 2016, President Andrzej Duda appointed junior member Julia Przyłębska as President of the Constitutional Tribunal.

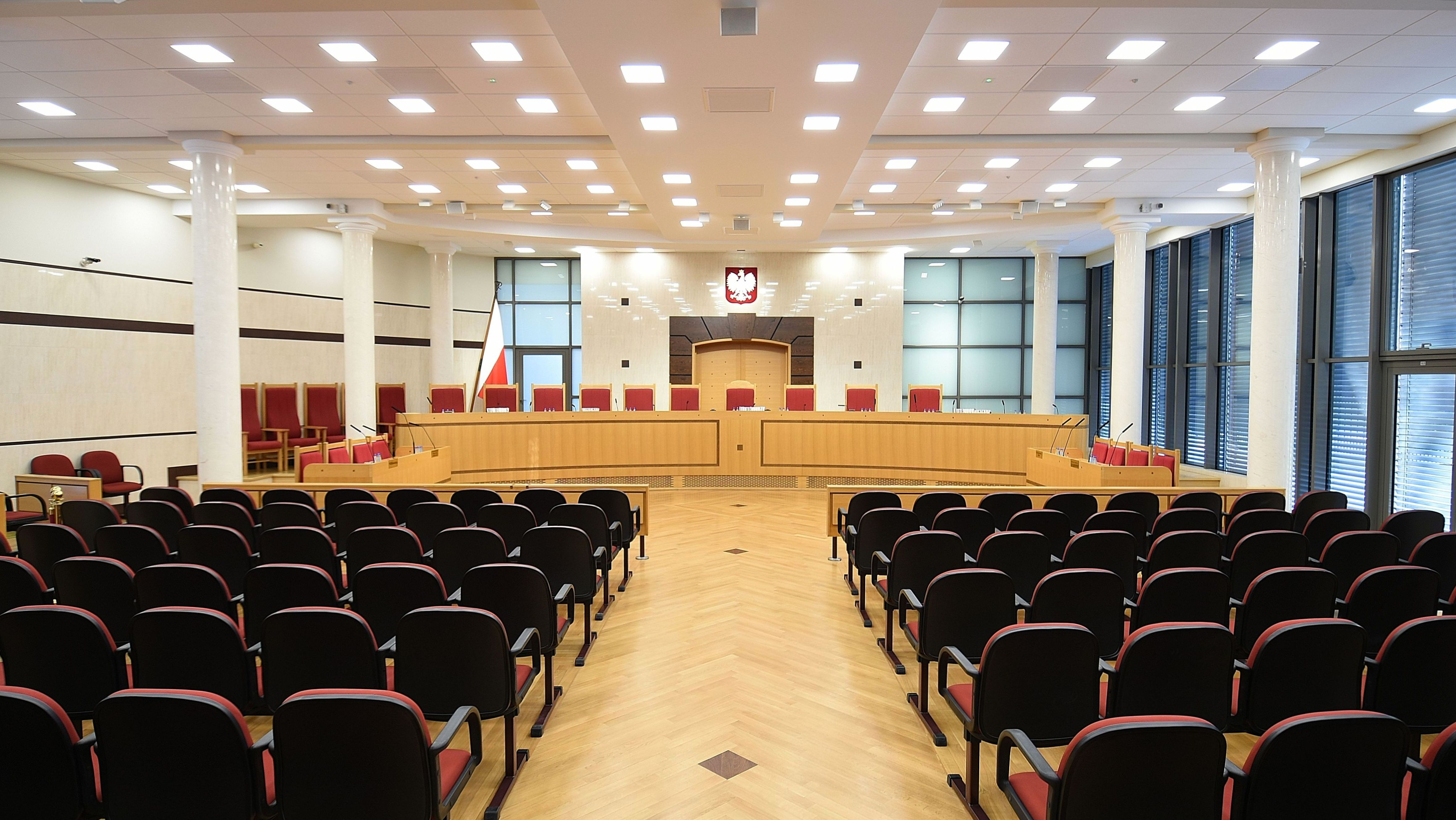
The Grand Courtroom, in which the Court adjudicates in its full composition

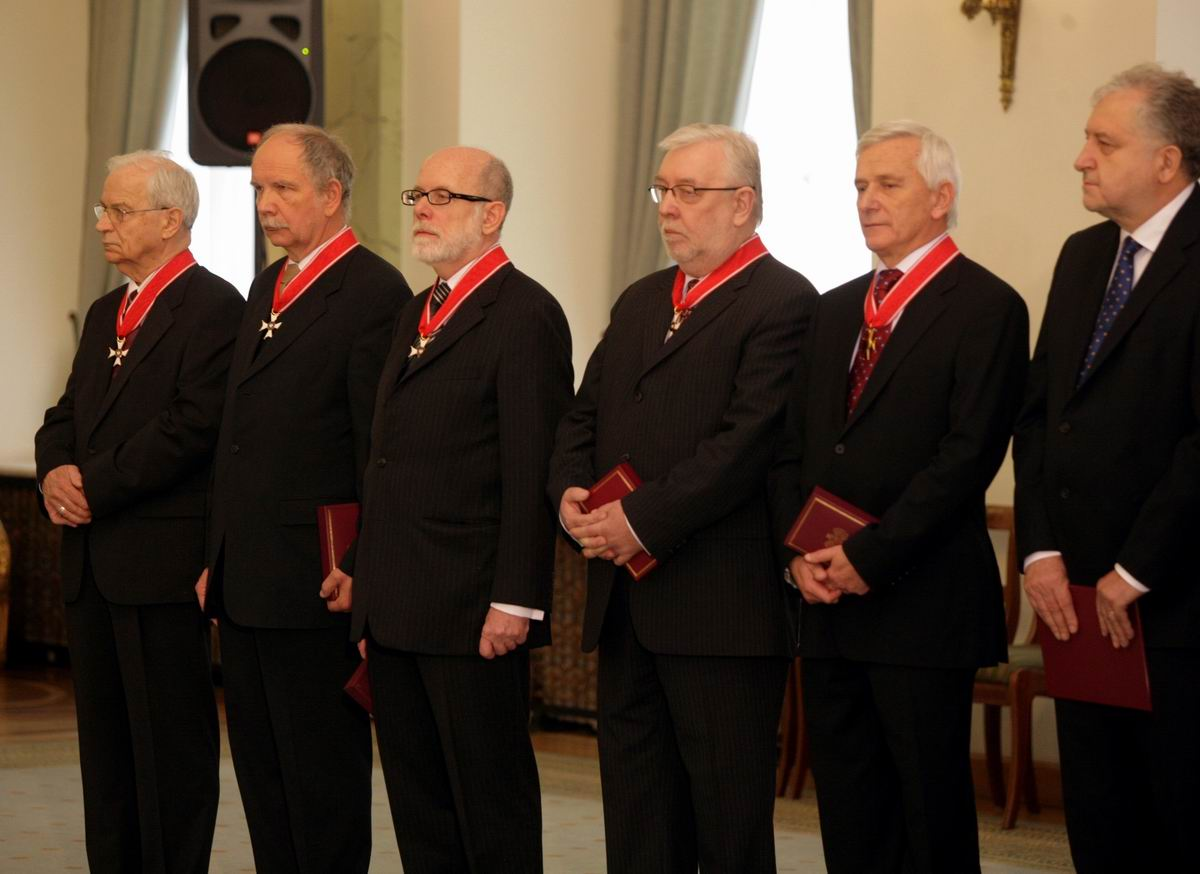
Presidents and Vice-Presidents of the Constitutional Tribunal from 2006 to 2016. Marek Mazurkiewicz, Andrzej Mączyński, Janusz Niemcewicz, Jerzy Stępień, Bohdan Zdziennicki i Andrzej Rzepliński (2010)

==== 2020–2021 ====
PiS was reelected with a majority to the Sejm in 2019, and the PiS-affiliated Andrzej Duda was reelected as president in 2020. Together, the Sejm and Duda filled the Court's 15 seats completely by 2021.

Following the reform and takeover of the Constitutional Tribunal by the Law and Justice, the independence and sovereignty of the institution was questioned and the tribunal was effectively paralysed. It was called a "puppet court" by Polish opposition judges' associations, some foreign judicial organisations and constitutionalist counterparts. In February 2020, former Constitutional Tribunal judges, including former presidents of the tribunal Andrzej Rzepliński, Marek Safjan, Jerzy Stępień, Bohdan Zdziennicki and Andrzej Zoll, stated,

We, the undersigned retired judges of the Constitutional Tribunal, regret to state that the actions of the legislature and the executive since 2015, and the Constitutional Tribunal leadership since 2017, have led to a dramatic decline in the significance and the prestige of this constitutional body, as well as to the inability to perform its constitutional tasks and duties. Unfortunately, the widespread belief that the Constitutional Tribunal has virtually been abolished is correct.

— former Constitutional Tribunal judges, Ruleoflaw.pl

Several cases were sent to the European Court of Human Rights (ECtHR) and the Court of Justice of the European Union (CJEU), challenging the Tribunal's legal status.

==== 2021: Xero Flor v Poland ====
In Xero Flor v Poland, the ECtHR ruled on 7 May 2021 that a Polish company had been refused the right to a fair trial because Muszyński's election was unlawful. The ECtHR stated that the "legislative and executive powers" in Poland had illegally influenced the Tribunal. It stated that the Tribunal was not a legally established court.

In a 14 July 2021 ruling, the Tribunal purported to reject the ECtHR ruling, claiming such competence has never been transferred by any treaty. The attempt was considered illegal by constitutional law experts according to the principle that Nemo iudex in causa sua, as the contested members of the court ruled on the legitimacy of their own appointment.

==== 2023–2024: start of Tusk government ====
On 4 March 2024, following a non-PiS government being elected in October 2023 and formally sworn in on 13 December 2023, a package of measures was announced with the aim of reforming the Tribunal. The measures included a prospective Sejm resolution calling on illegitimately appointed judges to resign voluntarily and branding Julia Przyłębska as not being authorised to be the Tribunal's chief justice (Przyłębska having been sworn in by Duda in December 2016 without the required resolution being issued by the general assembly of Tribunal judges, and being believed by a number of legal experts to have sat completely illegitimately since December 2022 (Note: According to the effective law (the Article 10 §2 of the Act of 30 November 2016 on organisation and mode of proceedings before the Constitutional Tribunal which came in force on 3 January 2017 after Przyłębska's appointment as the President) the term of the President of the Constitutional Tribunal lasts 6 years. Therefore Przyłębska's term should have ended on 21 December 2022. Przyłębska and her PiS backers, however, believed her term as President was not actually due to expire until December 2024, since this is when her term as a judge in general expires; as of 6 March 2024, she continued to sit as President of the Tribunal.)), prospective legislation to alter selection procedures (requiring candidates to take part in an open public hearing and to receive the approval of three fifths of MPs) and eligibility (anyone who has been an active politician within the last four years, including even being a member of a political party, would not be eligible to sit on the Tribunal; any politician who did get selected would not be able to rule on cases relating to legislation that they had been involved with within the last ten years), and prospective constitutional changes to allow for the implementation of the measures.

==== 2025: European Commission v Republic of Poland ====
In 2025, separately from the 2021 ECtHR judgment, in case C‑448/23, European Commission v. Republic of Poland, the Constitutional Tribunal was ruled illegitimate by the Court of Justice of the European Union, which found that the Constitutional Tribunal did not satisfy the requirements of an independent and impartial tribunal established by law. Key reasons for the finding were the irregularity in the 2015 appointment of three judges, and later of their successors, and irregularities in the 2016 appointment of the president of the Tribunal.

==== 2026: Suspension of Bogdan Święczkowski ====
The Polish constitutional crisis, which began in 2015, continued into 2026 between Prime Minister Donald Tusk's pro-European Union government and the right-wing, nationalist party Law and Justice (PiS) over control of the judiciary. In 2026, the Sejm elected eight judges to the Constitutional Tribunal (six in March, one in June, and one in September). President of Poland Karol Nawrocki invited three of the judges to swearing-in ceremonies at the Presidential Palace and refused to swear in the other five. On 13 October, the Venice Commission stated that all eight judges were full members of the tribunal. On 16 October, the eight new judges made a public statement asserting that Article 194 of the Polish Constitution gives no power to the Polish president in selecting members of the tribunal. By late October, the president of the tribunal, Bogdan Święczkowski, had not recognised the five judges as members of the tribunal, and filed a disciplinary case against the other three judges, attaching the eight judges' public statement as evidence in the case.

On 30 October 2026, Święczkowski and the vice-president of the tribunal, Bartłomiej Sochański, were suspended for a month by judge Anna Korwin-Piotrowska. An X account associated with the tribunal, and members of PiS, viewed the suspension of Święczkowski and the deployment of police to the tribunal as an attempted coup. Korwin-Piotrowska invited Nawrocki to meet her on his own at the tribunal building on the night of 30–31 October. Nawrocki then arrived at the building along with Sochański, Zbigniew Kapiński, and others. A physical altercation occurred between Nawrocki's group and Korwin-Piotrowska alongside a group of constitutional tribunal judges. This led to Nawrocki's group gaining access to the building with his group. Talks took place following this, and both Sochański and Nawrocki left the building a few hours later.

Nawrocki met with representatives of some parliamentary parties, Tusk made a televised speech, and several political parties proposed to modify and update the composition of the tribunal by a "reset". The Supreme Court criticised the suspension of Święczkowski as unconstitutional. The tribunal held a General Assembly on 3 November with eight judges present, in which the 2027 tribunal budget was voted, and held another General Assembly on 10 November, in which the powers of the tribunal president were weakened in favour of the full tribunal membership. The tribunal started work on the 100 oldest cases from 2013 to 2021 that were still pending.

== Landmark decisions ==
=== Case K 1/20 ===
The Tribunal received a referral by 119 MPs on whether or not abortions of pregnancies unrelated to rape or not threatening the mother's life, which they call "eugenic", are constitutional. The signatories argued that the provision violates Constitutional protections of human dignity (Article 30), the right to life (Article 39) or the prohibition against discrimination (Article 32).

On 22 October 2020, an 11–2 ruling declared that abortion in Poland due to foetal abnormality was violating the Constitutional protection of human dignity. This effectively made abortions on that basis unobtainable for women in Poland. The provision had been used for 1074 of the 1110 legal abortions in 2019. The ruling triggered the October 2020 Polish protests, which forced the government to delay the ruling's publication in the Dziennik Ustaw until 27 January 2021.

=== Case K 3/21 ===
In July 2021, Prime minister Mateusz Morawiecki asked the Tribunal for a constitutional review of three provisions of Treaty on European Union. Following a series of hearings of prominent officeholders, the Tribunal ruled on 7 October 2021 in a 12–2 decision that:

1. Article 1 of the Treaty on European Union (establishing an "ever closer union"), insofar as it is interpreted by the European Court of Justice in a "new step" (nowy etap) which
  - enlarges the EU institutions' competence beyond the limits that Poland accepted via its treaties,
  - opposes the primacy of the Constitution of Poland in both validity and application,
  - opposes the sovereignty of the Polish state,
  is unconstitutional;
2. Article 19 of the Treaty on European Union (that establishes the ECJ), insofar as it gives ordinary courts the right to disregard the Constitution, and to adjudicate on the basis of provisions repealed by the Sejm or deemed unconstitutional by the TK, is unconstitutional;
3. Article 19 and Article 2 of the Treaty on European Union (values) are unconstitutional insofar as they empower ordinary courts to question the constitutionality of judicial appointments by the President.

In this sense, all three branches of power (executive, legislative, judicial) in Poland in July 2021 argued that Poland's membership in the European Union does not entail that institutions external to the state have the supreme legal authority.

This was widely interpreted as a challenge against the primacy of European Union law, which emerged in Costa v. ENEL (1964), and was described by European Union (EU) politician Sophie in 't Veld and political groups European People's Party European Conservatives & Reformists as a judicial Polexit. European primacy had been admitted in previous Polish rulings, as it didn't infringe on Poland's sovereignty and the TFEU was compatible with the Polish constitution, in case K 18/04.

The tribunal's 7 October 2021 decision was seen as a key event in the escalade over judicial nominations and reforms between the EU and Poland that began in late 2015, when Law and Justice came to power, starting with the 2015 Polish Constitutional Court crisis. Many politicians in Brussels called upon the European Commission to freeze payments to Poland. The Commission President said that she was deeply concerned, and ordered to act swiftly. The recently implemented Rule of Law Conditionality Regulation could be used.

== Presidents and vice presidents ==
=== Presidents ===
No.	Start and end date	Full name	(Note: The colors only represent the majorities that elected each judge, as the Polish Constitution of 1997 mandates that judges shall be independent and shall not belong to any political party (Article 195).)	Sejm	Term as a Justice	Term length
Presidents
1.	1 December 1985 – 1 December 1989	Alfons Klafkowski		IX (PRL)	1 December 1985 – 1 December 1989	4 years, 0 days
2.	1 December 1989 – 19 November 1993	Mieczysław Tyczka		X (PRL)	1 December 1989 – 17 June 1994	4 years, 198 days (resigned)
3.	19 November 1993 – 1 December 1997	Andrzej Zoll		X (PRL)	1 December 1989 – 1 December 1997	8 years, 0 days
–	1 December 1997 – 6 January 1998	vacant				
4.	6 January 1998 – 5 November 2006	Marek Safjan		III	5 November 1997 – 5 November 2006	9 years, 0 days
5.	6 November 2006 – 25 June 2008	Jerzy Stępień		III	25 June 1999 – 25 June 2008	9 years, 0 days
6.	26 June 2008 – 2 December 2010	Bohdan Zdziennicki		IV	2 December 2001 – 2 December 2010	9 years, 0 days
7.	3 December 2010 – 19 December 2016	Andrzej Rzepliński		VI	19 December 2007 – 19 December 2016	9 years, 0 days
–	20 December 2016	Julia Przyłębska (Note: The 8th Sejm elected Henryk Cioch, Lech Morawski, and Mariusz Muszyński, even though Roman Hauser, Krzysztof Ślebzak, and Andrzej Jakubecki had been elected by the 7th Sejm in advance. The three seats' terms were to end after the 2015 election during the Sejm's recess, leaving room for conflicting interpretation of the constitution. Since the Henryk Cioch and Lech Morawski died during their terms, Jarosław Wyrembak and Justyn Piskorski who were elected in their place are also considered disputed.) (ruled irregular by the CJEU (Note: «H.C., L.M. and M.M., who had been elected on 2 December 2015, were among the six judges who participated, during the General Assembly of 20 December 2016, in the election of candidates to the position of President of the Trybunał Konstytucyjny (Constitutional Court). The fact that the election of those three judges was vitiated by a manifest infringement of Article 194(1) of the Polish Constitution and by a failure to comply with the requirements arising from the second subparagraph of Article 19(1) TEU was such as to render their participation in the General Assembly irregular, as well as the votes which they cast with a view to the selection of candidates for the position of President of the Trybunał Konstytucyjny (Constitutional Court). Therefore, it must be held that J.P. cannot be regarded as having lawfully obtained the five votes required by Article 21(8) of the Law laying down introductory provisions».))		VIII	9 December 2015 – 9 December 2024	9 years, 0 days
8.	21 December 2016 – 29 November 2024	Julia Przyłębska (ruled irregular by the CJEU)		VIII	9 December 2015 – 9 December 2024	9 years, 0 days
–	29 November – 9 December 2024	vacant (Note: Julia Przyłębska resigned from the position of president but continued to serve as a judge)				
9.	9 December 2024 – present (disputed)	Bogdan Święczkowski		IX	16 February 2022 – present	4 years, 273 days

=== Vice Presidents ===
No.	Start and end date	Full name	Sejm	Term as a Justice	Term length
Vice Presidents
1.	1 December 1985 – 1 December 1993	Leonard Łukaszuk	IX (PRL)	1 December 1985 – 1 December 1993	8 years, 0 days
2.	1 December 1993 – 1 December 2001	Janusz Trzciński	II	1 December 1993 – 1 December 2001	8 years, 0 days
3.	2 December 2001 – 1 December 2006	Andrzej Mączyński	III	1 December 1997 – 1 December 2006	9 years, 0 days
4.	2 December 2006 – 2 March 2010	Janusz Niemcewicz	III	2 March 2001 – 2 March 2010	9 years, 0 days
5.	3 March 2010 – 2 December 2010	Marek Mazurkiewicz	IV	2 December 2001 – 2 December 2010	9 years, 0 days
6.	3 December 2010 – 26 June 2017	Stanisław Biernat	VI	26 June 2008 – 26 June 2017	9 years, 0 days
–	27 June – 4 July 2017	vacant			
7.	5 July 2017 – 5 July 2023	Mariusz Muszyński	VIII	2 December 2015 – 2 December 2024	9 years, 0 days
–	6 July 2023 – 20 February 2025	vacant			
8.	21 February 2025 – present	Bartłomiej Sochański	IX	9 April 2020 – present	6 years, 221 days
Nominated by PiS or its coalition partners
Nominated by PO or its coalition partners
Nominated by OKP or its coalition partners
Nominated by SLD or its coalition partners
Nominated by UW or its coalition partners
Nominated by PZPR or its coalition partners

== Justices ==
=== Current ===
No. (Note: Numbers in parentheses indicate judges referred to as duplicates (Polish: dublerzy), in the sense that they were appointed by the PiS-dominated Sejm to replace judges considered by the Tusk government as having been validly elected.)	Full name	Sejm	Votes	Start date	Term length	Comment
(60.)	Jarosław Wyrembak	X	228	30 January 2018	8 years, 290 days	
69.	Wojciech Sych	X	228	8 April 2019	7 years, 222 days	
71.	Stanisław Piotrowicz	IX	230	5 December 2019	6 years, 346 days	
72.	Jakub Stelina	IX	233	5 December 2019	6 years, 346 days	
73.	Rafał Wojciechowski	IX	239	7 January 2020	6 years, 313 days	
74.	Bartłomiej Sochański	IX	234	9 April 2020	6 years, 221 days	
75.	Bogdan Święczkowski	IX	233	16 February 2022	4 years, 273 days	
76.	Magdalena Bentkowska	X	236	1 April 2026	229 days	
77.	Dariusz Szostek	X	237	1 April 2026	229 days	
78.	Marcin Dziurda	X	237	9 April 2026	221 days	
79.	Anna Korwin-Piotrowska	X	236	9 April 2026	221 days	
80.	Krystian Markiewicz	X	236	9 April 2026	221 days	
81.	Maciej Taborowski	X	237	9 April 2026	221 days	
82.	Sławomir Patyra	X	235	28 July 2026	111 days	
83.	Maciej Berek	X	226	14 October 2026	33 days	
Nominated by PiS or its coalition partners
Nominated by KO or its coalition partners

=== Length of tenure ===
This graphical timeline depicts the length of each current justice's tenure on the Court:

=== Former ===
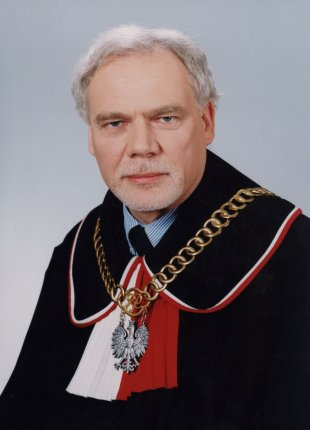
Marek Safjan, first President elected after the fall of communism in Poland

No.	Full name		Sejm	Term as a Justice	Term length
1.	prof. Henryk de Fiumel		IX (PRL)	1 December 1985 – 17 June 1986	198 days (died in office)
2.	prof. Kazimierz Buchała		IX (PRL)	1 December 1985 – 1 December 1989	4 years, 0 days
3.	prof. Natalia Gajl		IX (PRL)	1 December 1985 – 1 December 1989	4 years, 0 days
4.	dr Adam Józefowicz		IX (PRL)	1 December 1985 – 1 December 1989	4 years, 0 days
5.	dr Andrzej Kabat		IX (PRL)	1 December 1985 – 1 December 1989	4 years, 0 days
6.	prof. Alfons Klafkowski		IX (PRL)	1 December 1985 – 1 December 1989	4 years, 0 days
7.	prof. Stanisław Pawela		IX (PRL)	1 December 1985 – 1 December 1989	4 years, 0 days
8.	dr Czesław Bakalarski		IX (PRL)	1 December 1985 – 1 December 1993	8 years, 0 days
9.	prof. Kazimierz Działocha		IX (PRL)	1 December 1985 – 1 December 1993	8 years, 0 days
10.	prof. Henryk Groszyk		IX (PRL)	1 December 1985 – 1 December 1993	8 years, 0 days
11.	prof. Leonard Łukaszuk		IX (PRL)	1 December 1985 – 1 December 1993	8 years, 0 days
12.	Remigiusz Orzechowski		IX (PRL)	1 December 1985 – 13 August 1993	7 years, 255 days (died in office)
13.	Maria Łabor-Soroka	-	IX (PRL)	25 November 1986 – 30 November 1993	7 years, 5 days
14.	Antoni Filcek		X (PRL)	1 December 1989 – 31 October 1992	2 years, 335 days (resigned)
15.	prof. Mieczysław Tyczka		X (PRL)	1 December 1989 – 17 June 1994	4 years, 198 days (resigned)
16.	prof. Janina Zakrzewska		X (PRL)	1 December 1989 – 27 May 1995	5 years, 177 days (died in office)
17.	prof. Tomasz Dybowski		X (PRL)	1 December 1989 – 1 December 1997	8 years, 0 days
18.	prof. Wojciech Łączkowski		X (PRL)	1 December 1989 – 1 December 1997	8 years, 0 days
19.	prof. Andrzej Zoll		X (PRL)	1 December 1989 – 1 December 1997	8 years, 0 days
20.	Ferdynand Rymarz	-	I	19 February 1993 – 19 February 2001	8 years, 0 days
21.	dr hab. Błażej Wierzbowski		II	1 December 1993 – 30 November 1998	4 years, 364 days (resigned)
22.	prof. Wojciech Sokolewicz		II	1 December 1993 – 31 May 1999	5 years, 181 days (resigned)
23.	prof. Zdzisław Czeszejko-Sochacki		II	1 December 1993 – 1 December 2001	8 years, 0 days
24.	prof. Lech Garlicki		II	1 December 1993 – 1 December 2001	8 years, 0 days
25.	Stefan Jan Jaworski		II	1 December 1993 – 1 December 2001	8 years, 0 days
26.	prof. Janusz Trzciński		II	1 December 1993 – 1 December 2001	8 years, 0 days
27.	prof. Krzysztof Kolasiński	-	II	27 May 1994 – 27 May 2002	8 years, 0 days
28.	Jadwiga Skórzewska-Łosiak		II	21 July 1995 – 21 July 2003	8 years, 0 days
29.	prof. Teresa Dębowska-Romanowska		III	5 November 1997 – 5 November 2006	9 years, 0 days
30.	prof. Marek Safjan		III	5 November 1997 – 5 November 2006	9 years, 0 days
31.	prof. Marian Zdyb		III	5 November 1997 – 5 November 2006	9 years, 0 days
32.	Wiesław Johann		III	1 December 1997 – 1 December 2006	9 years, 0 days
33.	prof. Biruta Lewaszkiewicz-Petrykowska		III	1 December 1997 – 1 December 2006	9 years, 0 days
34.	prof. Andrzej Mączyński		III	1 December 1997 – 1 December 2006	9 years, 0 days
35.	dr hab. Jerzy Ciemniewski		III	18 December 1998 – 18 December 2007	9 years, 0 days
36.	Jerzy Stępień		III	25 June 1999 – 25 June 2008	9 years, 0 days
37.	Janusz Niemcewicz		III	2 March 2001 – 2 March 2010	9 years, 0 days
38.	prof. Marian Grzybowski		IV	2 December 2001 – 2 December 2010	9 years, 0 days
39.	dr hab. Marek Mazurkiewicz		IV	2 December 2001 – 2 December 2010	9 years, 0 days
40.	dr hab. Mirosław Wyrzykowski		IV	2 December 2001 – 2 December 2010	9 years, 0 days
41.	dr Bohdan Zdziennicki		IV	2 December 2001 – 2 December 2010	9 years, 0 days
42.	prof. Ewa Łętowska		IV	28 May 2002 – 28 May 2011	9 years, 0 days
43.	prof. Adam Jamróz		IV	22 July 2003 – 22 July 2012	9 years, 0 days
44.	dr hab. Maria Gintowt-Jankowicz		V	6 November 2006 – 6 November 2015	9 years, 0 days
45.	Wojciech Hermeliński		V	6 November 2006 – 6 November 2015	9 years, 0 days
46.	Marek Kotlinowski		V	6 November 2006 – 6 November 2015	9 years, 0 days
47.	dr hab. Zbigniew Cieślak		V	2 December 2006 – 2 December 2015	9 years, 0 days
48.	dr hab. Teresa Liszcz		V	8 December 2006 – 8 December 2015	9 years, 0 days
49.	Lidia Bagińska		V	8 December 2006 – 12 March 2007	94 days (resigned)
50.	prof. Mirosław Granat		V	27 April 2007 – 27 April 2016	9 years, 0 days
51.	prof. Andrzej Rzepliński		VI	19 December 2007 – 19 December 2016	9 years, 0 days
52.	prof. Stanisław Biernat		VI	26 June 2008 – 26 June 2017	9 years, 0 days
53.	prof. Sławomira Wronkowska-Jaśkiewicz		VI	6 May 2010 – 6 May 2019	9 years, 0 days
54.	Stanisław Rymar		VI	3 December 2010 – 3 December 2019	9 years, 0 days
55.	prof. Piotr Tuleja		VI	3 December 2010 – 3 December 2019	9 years, 0 days
56.	prof. Marek Zubik		VI	3 December 2010 – 3 December 2019	9 years, 0 days
57.	prof. Małgorzata Pyziak-Szafnicka		VI	5 January 2011 – 5 January 2020	9 years, 0 days
58.	prof. Andrzej Wróbel		VI	29 May 2011 – 24 January 2017	5 years, 240 days (resigned)
59.	prof. Leon Kieres		VI	23 July 2012 – 23 July 2021	9 years, 0 days
60.	prof. Roman Hauser		VII	7 November 2015 – 7 November 2024 (never seated)	9 years, 0 days (election overruled)
61.	prof. Krzysztof Ślebzak		VII	7 November 2015 – 7 November 2024 (never seated)	9 years, 0 days (election overruled)
62.	prof. Andrzej Jakubecki		VII	7 November 2015 – 7 November 2024 (never seated)	9 years, 0 days (election overruled)
	prof. Bronisław Sitek		VII	(3 December 2015) (never seated)	0 days (election ruled unconstitutional)
	prof. Andrzej Sokala		VII	(9 December 2015) (never seated)	0 days (election ruled unconstitutional)
(60.)	prof. Henryk Cioch		VIII	2 December 2015 – 20 December 2017 (ruled irregular)	2 years, 18 days (died in office) (election ruled unconstitutional)
(61.)	prof. Lech Morawski		VIII	2 December 2015 – 12 July 2017 (ruled irregular)	1 year, 222 days (died in office) (election ruled unconstitutional)
(62.)	dr hab. Mariusz Muszyński		VIII	3 December 2015 – 3 December 2024 (ruled irregular)	9 years, 0 days (election ruled unconstitutional)
63.	Piotr Pszczółkowski		VIII	3 December 2015 – 3 December 2024	9 years, 0 days
64.	Julia Przyłębska		VIII	9 December 2015 – 9 December 2024	9 years, 0 days
65.	dr hab. Zbigniew Jędrzejewski		VIII	28 April 2016 – 28 April 2025	9 years, 0 days
66.	dr hab. Michał Warciński		VIII	20 December 2016 – 20 December 2025	9 years, 0 days
67.	dr hab. Grzegorz Jędrejek		VIII	27 February 2017 – 19 January 2020	2 years, 326 days (died in office)
68.	Andrzej Zielonacki		VIII	28 June 2017 – 28 June 2026	9 years, 0 days
(61.)	dr hab. Justyn Piskorski		VIII	18 September 2017 – 18 September 2026 (ruled irregular)	9 years, 0 days (election ruled unconstitutional)
70.	Krystyna Pawłowicz		IX	5 December 2019 – 5 December 2025	6 years, 0 days (resigned)
No.	Full name	(Note: The colors only represent the majorities that elected each judge, as the Polish Constitution of 1997 mandates that judges shall be independent and shall not belong to any political party (Article 195).)	Sejm	Term as a Justice	Term length

== See also ==
- Judiciary
- Rule of law
- Rule According to Higher Law
- Supreme Court of Poland
- 2015–present Polish constitutional crisis
