= Henryk Cioch =

Polish lawyer and lecturer

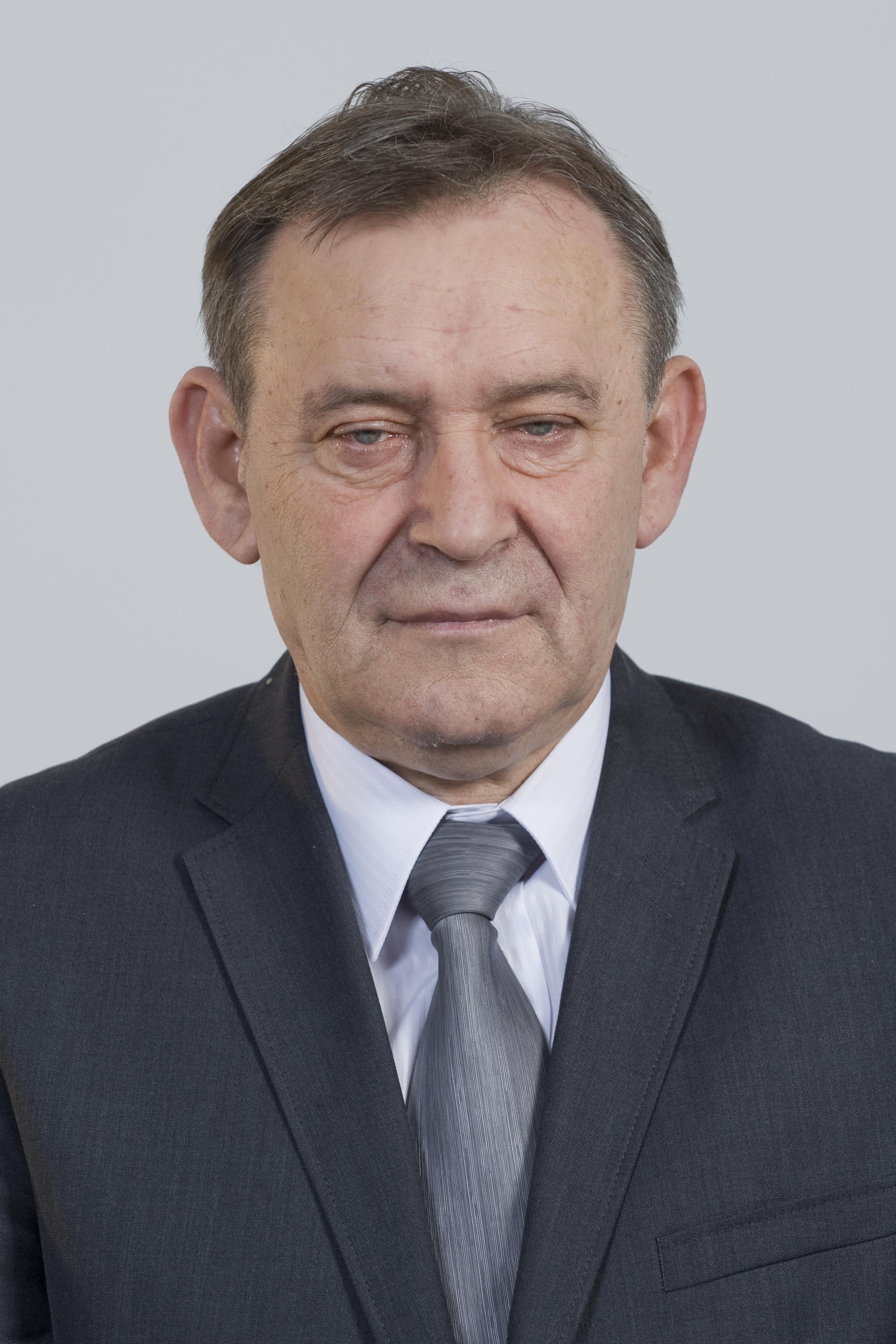

Senator
- In office November 2011 – November 2015

Judge of the Constitutional Tribunal
- In office 2015–2017

Personal details
- Born: 30 July 1951 Lubaczów, Poland
- Died: 20 December 2017 (aged 66) Lublin, Poland
- Party: Independent

Henryk Cioch (30 July 1951 – 20 December 2017) was a Polish lawyer, lecturer, professor of law, Senator and justice of Polish Constitutional Tribunal (appointment disputed).

== Early life ==
In 1969, Cioch graduated from high school in Lubaczów, Poland. In 1973, he graduated with honors from the Faculty of Law and Administration at the University of Maria Curie-Sklodowska (UMCS) in Lublin.

Cioch joined the Institute of Civil Law as an assistant. In 1982, he defended his doctoral thesis, entitled "Transforming Cooperative Property Rights," written under the direction of Professor Jerzy Ignatowicz.

== Political career ==
In December 2008, Cioch was named Chairman of the Scientific Council of the Institute of Stefczyka in Sopot. In January 2010, President Lech Kaczyński named him as a member of the National Development Council.

In the 2011 election, Cioch was a non-partisan candidate for Law and Justice to the Senate. After campaigning for a seat in the upper house of Parliament, he tallied 52,961 votes, winning the election. Cioch retired in 2015.

== Death ==
Cioch died on December 20, 2017, in Lublin at age 66.
