= Natalia Gajl =

Polish lawyer and economist

Natalia Gajl (December 23, 1921 in Poznań – April 6, 1998) was a Polish lawyer and economist, professor in law and judge of the Constitutional Tribunal in 1985–1989.

She was the head of the Department of Financial Law of the University of Łódź from 1964, Deputy Dean of the faculty in 1969–1972, and Dean in 1972–1981. She was the first female docent of financial law in Polish higher education.
