= National Public Prosecutor's Office =

Polish Civil Organizational Unit

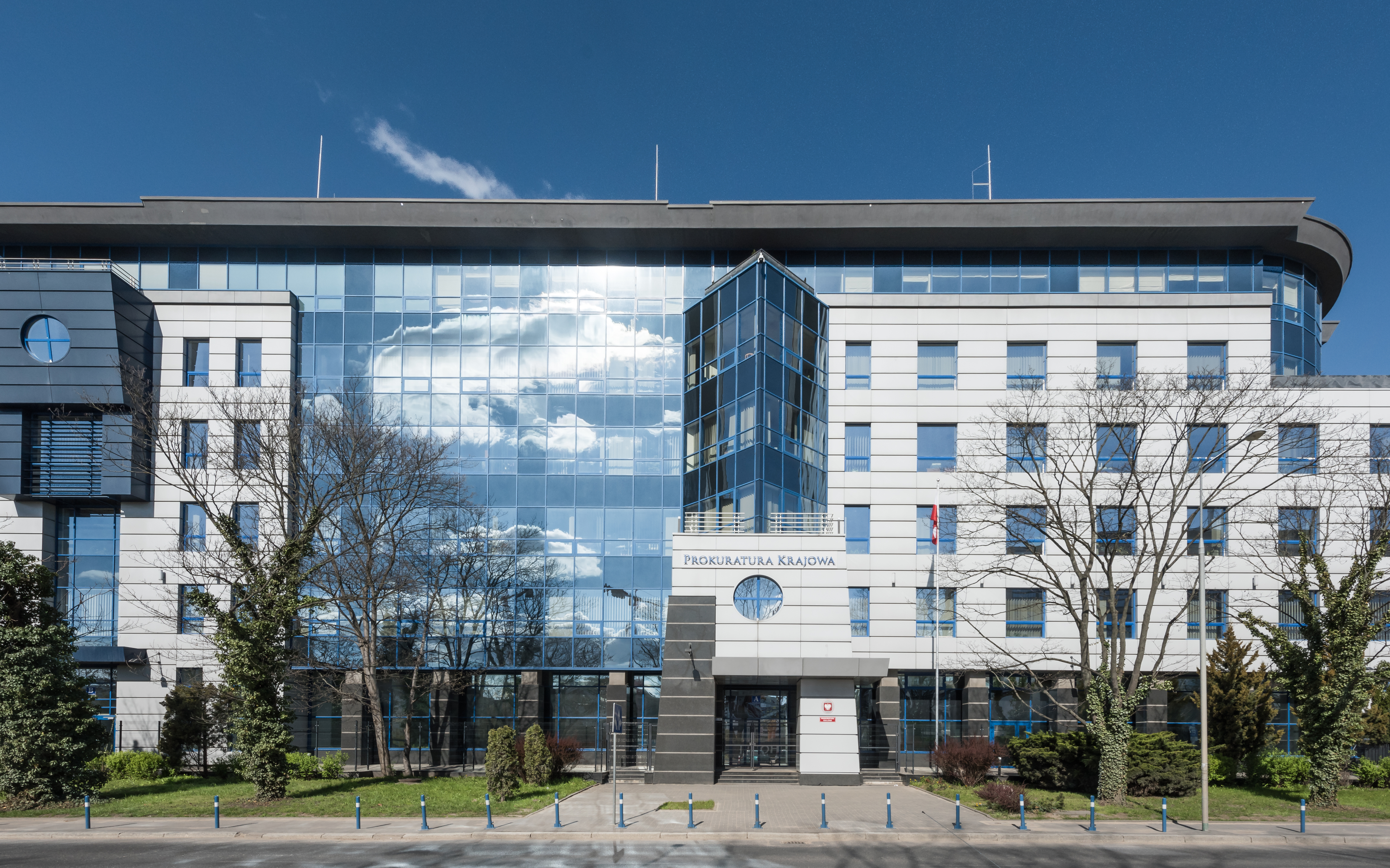
National Public Prosecutor's Office in Warsaw

National Public Prosecutor's Office (Polish: Prokuratura Krajowa, sometimes also translated as State Prosecutor's Office) is the highest civil organizational unit in Poland's Prosecutor's offices. It is headed by the National Public Prosecutor (Prokurator Krajowy). The National Public Prosecutor is the second-highest-ranking prosecutor in Poland, after the Public Prosecutor General.

In 2010 the National Public Prosecutor's Office was replaced by the General Public Prosecutor's Office (Prokuratura Generalna). The title "Public Prosecutor General", however, is still reserved for the one who supervises all other prosecutors (the difference is that he is now elected from independent candidates, and no longer a governmental minister).

In 2016, the National Public Prosecutor's Office was reinstated under the act of January 28, replacing the former General Public Prosecutor's Office. The office of the Public Prosecutor General is again combined with the office of the Polish Minister of Justice, while the National Public Prosecutor is the head of the National Public Prosecutor's Office and acts as the vice Public Prosecutor General.

== National Public Prosecutors ==
National Public Prosecutors of Poland
State Public Prosecutors	Term of office
???	???
Henryk Pracki	07.07.1996 - 12.07.2001
Włodzimierz Blajerski	12.07.2001 – 22.10.2001
Andrzej Kaucz	22.10.2001 – 14.11.2001
Karol Napierski	17.12.2001 – 31.10.2005
Janusz Kaczmarek	31.10.2005 - 08.02.2007
Tomasz Szałek (acting)	04.04.2007 – 14.05.2007
none	---
Dariusz Barski (acting)	14.06.2007 – 19.07.2007
Dariusz Barski	19.07.2007 - 21.11.2007
Marek Staszak	21.11.2007 - 20.01 2009
Edward Zalewski	06.03.2009 - 31.03.2010
Bogdan Święczkowski	07.03.2016 - 16.02.2022
Dariusz Barski	18.03.2022 - 12.01.2024
Jacek Bilewicz (acting)	12.01.2024 - 26.02.2024
Dariusz Korneluk	26.02.2024 -
