= Andrzej Rzepliński =

Polish lawyer

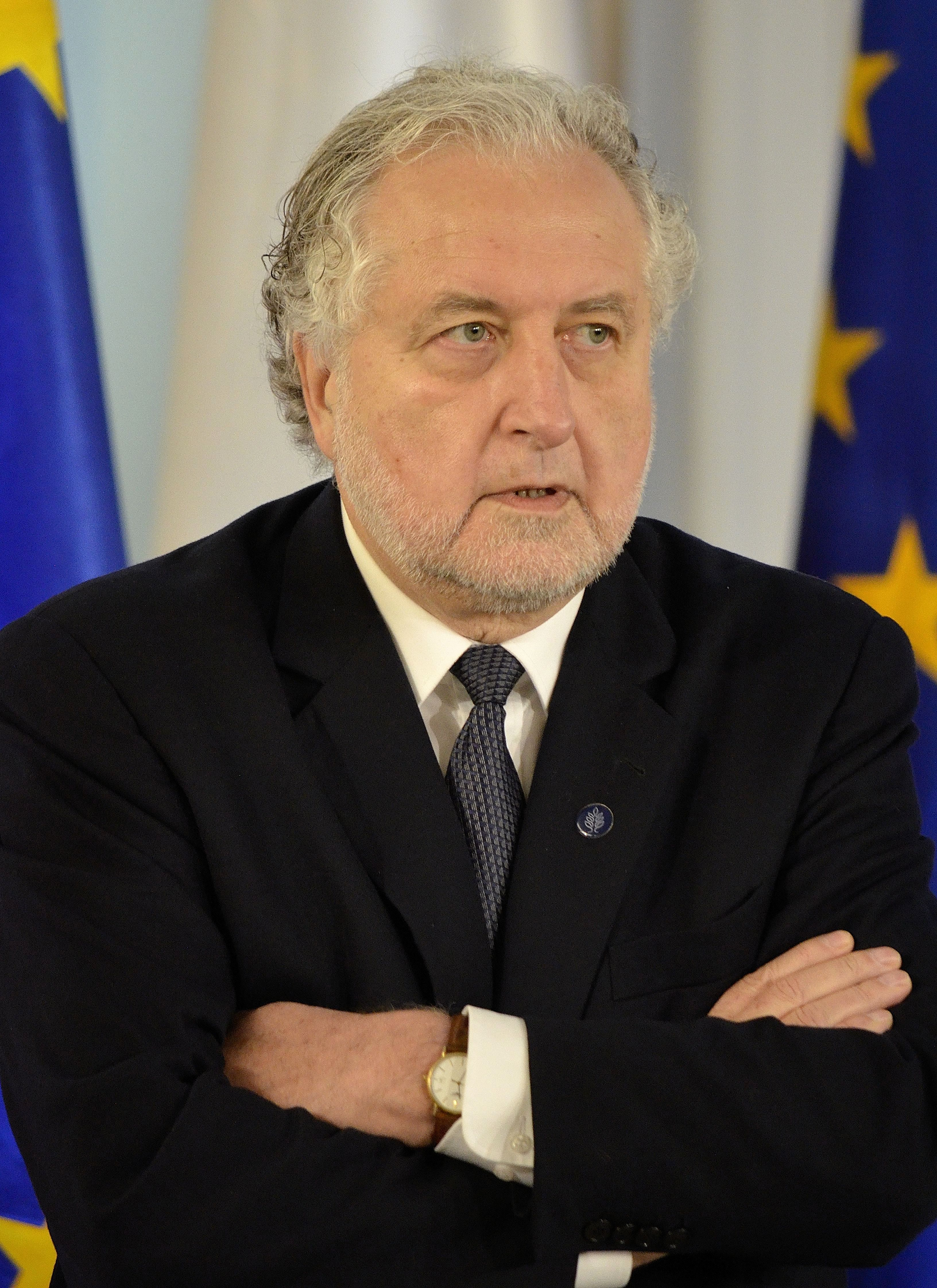

7th President of the Constitutional Tribunal
- In office 3 December 2010 – 19 December 2016
- Nominated by: Bronisław Komorowski
- Preceded by: Bohdan Zdziennicki
- Succeeded by: Julia Przyłębska

Judge of the Constitutional Tribunal of the Republic of Poland
- In office 18 December 2007 – 19 December 2016
- Nominated by: Lech Kaczyński
- Preceded by: Jerzy Ciemniewski
- Succeeded by: Michał Warciński

Personal details
- Born: Andrzej Rzepliński; 26 November 1949 (age 76) Ciechanów, Poland
- Spouse: Irena Rzeplińska (m. 1971)
- Education: University of Warsaw (J.D.), (Habilitation)

Andrzej Rzepliński (born 26 November 1949) is a Polish lawyer, Professor of Jurisprudence, human rights expert, member of International Helsinki Federation for Human Rights, a judge of the Polish Constitutional Tribunal from 2007 and its president from 2010 to 2016.

== Biography ==
Andrzej Rzepliński was born in Ciechanów as the son of Helena and Klemens, who ran a farm in nearby Przążew [1]. He graduated in 1971 at the Faculty of Law and Administration of the University of Warsaw. In 1978 he obtained a doctoral degree in the field of criminology, and in 1990 a postdoctoral degree (dissertation titled Judiciary in People's Poland, Between Availability and Independence). In 2000, he received the academic title of professor. Professionally associated with the University of Warsaw, where he came to the position of full professor. He also became the head of the Department of Criminology and Criminal Policy at the IPSiR, he was the dean of the Faculty of Applied Social Sciences and Resocialisation of the University of Warsaw.

Until 1981 he belonged to the Polish United Workers' Party (PZPR), from which he was removed. At the end of the 1970s he was the second secretary of the POP in the Institute of Social Prevention and Resocialisation of the University of Warsaw. In the 1980s, he belonged to Solidarity. He was a participant in the work of the Citizens' Center for Legislative Legislative Initiatives [2]. He is the author of numerous scientific publications.

A member of the Helsinki Committee for Human Rights in Poland since becoming a member in 1989, he assumed the position of the secretary of the board of the Helsinki Foundation for Human Rights (2000 – 2007) as well as a member of the program council of the Precedent Matters Program in this foundation. He acted as a United Nations expert, the Council of Europe and the Organization for Security and Co-operation in Europe. He specializes in the field of criminology, criminal law and human rights. As a parliamentary expert, he cooperated on the Act on the Institute of National Remembrance, and later advised the IPN president Leon Kieres and the coordinator for special services Janusz Pałubicki [3]. In 1998, he was a candidate for the function of a general inspector of personal data protection, the 3rd term Sejm was not elected to this position [3].

In the years 1996-2001 he was a member of the Program Council, and since 2004 the Consultative Council of the Press Freedom Monitoring Center [4]. In 2005, he was candidate, on the recommendation of Civic Platform, to the position of the ombudsman in connection with the expiration of the term of office of Andrzej Zoll. In the first voting in June, he did not receive the Sejm's support; Submitted again in July, he was recommended by the Sejm, but his candidacy was rejected in the same month by Democratic Left Alliance-dominated Senate.

In 2006 he was a candidate for a judge of the Constitutional Tribunal, he was not elected to this position by the Sejm [5]

In December 2007 with recommendation of Civic Platform he was elected as a member of Constitutional Tribunal of the Republic of Poland and took the oath of office on 19 December 2007. In December 2010 he became president of the Tribunal. In December 2016 he was succeeded as a judge of the Tribunal by Michał Warciński and as a president of the Tribunal by Julia Przyłębska.

He was generally viewed as belonging to the liberal wing of the Tribunal. Before becoming a judge, Rzepliński spent a considerable portion of his legal career as a scholar, professor ordinarius at University of Warsaw and dean of Faculty of Applied Social Sciences and Resocialization.

He received the Knight's Cross of the Order of Polonia Restituta (1997), Commander's Cross of Order of the Lithuanian Grand Duke Gediminas (Lithuania, 2013), Pro Ecclesia et Pontifice (Vatican, 2015), Kisiel Prize (2015) and an honorary Doctor of Laws degree from University of Osnabrück (2016).

He has two daughters with lawyer Irena Rzeplińska, whom he married in 1971.

== See also ==
- Polish constitutional crisis, 2015
