= Anna Korwin-Piotrowska =

Polish judge (born 1969)

- Korwin-Piotrowska in 2026

President of the Constitutional Tribunal (disputed)
- Acting
- Assumed office 30 October 2026
- Preceded by: Bogdan Święczkowski

Judge of the Constitutional Tribunal
- De facto
- Assumed office 9 April 2026

Personal details
- Born: 1 November 1969 (age 57)
- Education: Wrocław University

Anna Korwin-Piotrowska (born 1 November 1969) is a Polish judge and lawyer. Since 30 October 2026 she has been de facto acting as president of the Constitutional Tribunal, with the legality of her presidency being disputed.

== Youth and education ==
Korwin-Piotrowska was born on 1 November 1969 and graduated from the Faculty of Law of the University of Wrocław. In 2004, she completed postgraduate studies in European law at the Warsaw School of Economics. In 2014, she completed postgraduate studies in justice management at the same university.

== Constitutional Tribunal judge ==
In 2026, she was elected by the Sejm to a role as a judge of the Constitutional Tribunal. Under Polish law, judges of the Constitutional Tribunal are elected by the Sejm, after which they take an oath before the President of the Republic of Poland. Following their election, the judges—including Korwin-Piotrowska—asked that the President set a date for the swearing-in ceremony, but they received no response. Consequently, the President was invited to attend the swearing-in of the judges at the Sejm. The President, however, did not appear. As a result, the oath was taken before the Sejm, and the President did not recognize the newly elected judges.

From 30 October 2026, she is de facto acting as president of the Constitutional Tribunal after she suspended the tribunal's president, Bogdan Święczkowski. The legal basis for her orders was Article 11, paragraph 2, in conjunction with Article 12, paragraph 4, of the Act of 30 November 2016, on the Organization and Proceedings before the Constitutional Tribunal (in polish Ustawa z dnia 30 listopada 2016 r. o organizacji i trybie postępowania przed Trybunałem Konstytucyjnym). The act states that, in the event that it is not possible to authorize the Vice-President or another judge to act, the President of the Constitutional Tribunal shall be deputized by the judge with the longest judicial and professional tenure. The one-month suspension of Bogdan Święczkowski and Bartłomiej Sochański was based on Article 130 of the Law on the System of Ordinary Courts, through Article 19 of the November 2016 law on the status of Constitutional Tribunal judges and Article 10.1 of the December 2017 law on the Supreme Court. Article 130 allows the president of a court or their deputy to immediately relieve a judge of their duties if the dignity of the court or the essential interests of the service require that.

The suspension was called unconstitutional by Karol Nawrocki, the President of Poland, and was called an attempted coup by an X/Twitter account associated with the Constitutional Tribunal, and by members of the opposition PiS Party. The suspension was criticized by several legal scholars.
