= Marcin Dziurda =

Polish judge (born 1972)

Marcin Dziurda (born 1972) is a Polish judge.

Dziurda in 2026

== Youth and education ==
Dziurda was born in 1972, and graduated from the Faculty of Law and Administration and the Faculty of Journalism and Political Science of the University of Warsaw.

== Judge ==
On 13 March 2026, the Sejm of the 10th term elected him as a judge of the Constitutional Tribunal.

== Awards ==
- Knight's Cross of the Order of Polonia Restituta (2017)
