= Julia Przyłębska =

Polish jurist

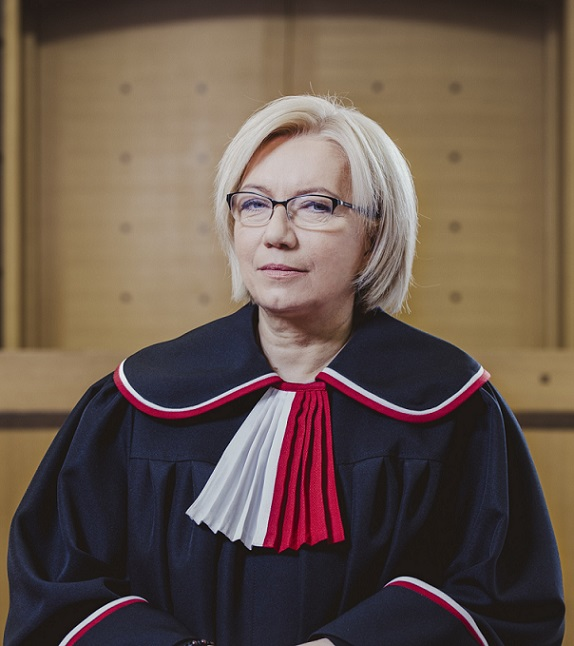

8th President of the Constitutional Tribunal
- In office 20 December 2016 – 29 November 2024 (ruled invalid)
- Nominated by: Andrzej Duda
- Preceded by: Andrzej Rzepliński
- Succeeded by: Bogdan Święczkowski

Judge of the Constitutional Tribunal
- In office 9 December 2015 – 9 December 2024
- Nominated by: Andrzej Duda

Personal details
- Born: Julia Anna Żmudzińska; 16 November 1959 (age 66) Bydgoszcz, Poland
- Spouse: Andrzej Przyłębski
- Children: 2 sons
- Education: University of Poznań

Julia Anna Przyłębska (née Żmudzińska; born 16 November 1959) is a Polish judge, she was President of the Constitutional Tribunal of the Republic of Poland from December 2016 to November 2024, until she resigned.

== Judicial career ==
In 1982 she graduated from the Faculty of Law and Administration, Adam Mickiewicz University, Poznań. During her studies she was a member of the Independent Students' Association.

From 1984 to 1998 she was a judge trainee and an associate judge at the Regional Court in Poznań. From 1988 to 1991 she served as a judge at a District Court in Poznań, in the Civil Department.

From 1991 to 1998 she served as a delegated judge, then as a judge at the Regional Court in Poznań in the Social Insurances Department. From 1990 to 1992 she was the Head of Employees’ Council at the Regional Court in Poznań. From 1990 to 1997 she was a member and the deputy chairman of the Regional Electoral Commission in Poznań.

From 1998 to 2001, having resigned from the bench, she served in diplomacy as a consul and diplomat – counselor of the embassy at the Polish Embassy in Cologne and Berlin.

From 2001 to 2003 she resumed service as a judge at the Regional Court in Poznań. She was appointed by President of the Republic of Poland despite obtaining a negative opinion from the authorities of Regional Court in Poznań. The opinion was based on numerous errors in issuing verdicts, high number of overturned verdicts and high absence from work.

From 2003 to 2007, having resigned from the bench once more, she served again in diplomacy as a diplomat – counselor of the embassy at the Polish Embassy in Berlin.

As a representative of the Polish Embassy she was a member of the negotiating team handling compensation for forced labour. She was responsible for cooperation of the Public Interest Commissioner with the Stasi Records Agency – she established contact between these bodies and later she coordinated cooperation with the Institute of National Remembrance. She was a member of the Division for Acquisition of Information at the Archive in Arolsen. In 2006 she was responsible for the restoration of a real estate in Berlin, which the Polish government purchased in 1939 to build there the Polish Institute. She prepared legal analyses for the Ministry of Foreign Affairs concerning national and international law. From 2005 to 2007 she coordinated talks concerning compensations for victims of Nazi crimes and granting the Polish diaspora, Polonia, minority status in (Germany).

She received a medal from the Association of Jewish Veterans and Victims of the Second World War.

In 2007 she resumed her service as a judge at the Regional Court in Poznań in the VIII Social Security Department. Since 2009 she was the deputy chairwoman of the Department and since 1 July 2015 she was the chairwoman of the Labour Law and Social Security Department.

She participated in European internships and conferences on national and European law.

In December 2015, with the recommendation of the ruling Law and Justice (PiS) party, she was elected as a member of the Constitutional Tribunal of the Republic of Poland. On 21 December 2016, the President of the Republic of Poland appointed her the President of the Constitutional Tribunal. This appointment was ruled invalid in 2025, as Przyłębska claimed to have been elected as candidate by 5 out of 14 judges (the minimum required by the law), but 3 of the 6 judges participating in the vote had not been regularly appointed.

In a quasi-unanimous decision published on 23 October 2020, the Tribunal ruled unconstitutional the provision of the 1993 Act permitting abortion when the fetus is predicted to have a "disability or incurable illness." It was a landmark decision that marked the influence of Catholic teachings on the court, but one that has led to large-scale protests and social unrest in many Polish cities.

== Private life ==
She is married to Andrzej Przyłębski, former ambassador to Germany. They have two sons.

== See also ==
- Polish constitutional crisis, 2015
