= Magdalena Bentkowska =

Polish judge and lawyer (born 1966)

Magdalena Bentkowska (born 24 November 1966) is a Polish judge and lawyer.

Magdalena Bentkowska

== Biography ==
Bentkowska was born 24 November, 1966 in Rzeszow to lawyer and politician Aleksander Bentkowski and Danuta.

On 13 March 2026, she was elected to the position of judge of the Constitutional Tribunal by the Sejm. She received 236 votes in favor, with 186 votes against and 4 abstentions. She was one of the six candidates submitted by the Presidium of the Sejm. On 1 April of the same year, together with Dariusz Szostek, she took a vow to the President Karol Nawrocki, taking up the position. The remaining four judges are waiting to take the oath and take office. On 9 April, she assumed the duties of the judge.
