= Bogdan Święczkowski =

Polish jurist and prosecutor (born 1970)

- Święczkowski in 2019

9th President of the Constitutional Tribunal (Disputed) (Note: Disputed since 30 October 2026)
- Incumbent
- Assumed office 9 December 2024
- Nominated by: Andrzej Duda
- Preceded by: Julia Przyłębska
- Succeeded by: Anna Korwin-Piotrowska (Disputed)

Judge of the Constitutional Tribunal (Note: Suspended since 30 October 2026, disputed)
- Incumbent
- Assumed office 16 February 2022
- Nominated by: Andrzej Duda

Personal details
- Born: Bogdan Święczkowski; 22 May 1970 (age 56) Sosnowiec, Poland
- Education: Jagiellonian University

Bogdan Roman Święczkowski (born 22 May 1970) is a Polish jurist, lawyer, and prosecutor. Between 2006–2007, he served as the head of the Internal Security Agency and in 2015 he was the Undersecretary of State in the Ministry of Justice. In 2016–2022, he was appointed the national prosecutor and the first deputy of the public prosecutor general.

In February 2022, he was appointed a judge of the Constitutional Tribunal. He served as the Tribunal's president from December 2024 until his de facto suspension in October 2026.

== Education ==
In 1994, he graduated from the Faculty of Law of the Jagiellonian University, and then he completed a prosecutor's apprenticeship at the District Prosecutor's Office in Tychy.

== Legal and political career ==
After completing his apprenticeship in 1996, he worked at the District Prosecutor's Office in Sosnowiec as: assessor and (since 1998) prosecutor. Between 2001–2005 he was a prosecutor of the District Prosecutor's Office in Katowice.

From 2003–2005 he served in the Division VI for Combating Organized Crime. In November 2005, he started working in the National Public Prosecutor's Office, where he was the deputy director and director of the Organized Crime Office, supervising and coordinating the most serious investigations concerning organized crime groups and crimes of a financial and economic nature.

On 13 September 2006, he was appointed acting head of the Internal Security Agency, and on 19 October 2006, head of the Internal Security Agency. He was dismissed from this function on 2 November 2007. Restored to the position of a public prosecutor of the National Public Prosecutor's Office, he retired with the liquidation of this unit and the establishment of the General Public Prosecutor's Office.

In the 2010 local government elections, as a non-party member, he was elected as a councillor of the Silesian voivodship sejmik from the Law and Justice list. In the parliamentary elections of 2011, he became the leader of the PiS list to the Sejm in the Wałbrzych constituency. He obtained a parliamentary seat, receiving 17 109 votes. After the elections, Bogdan Święczkowski refused to resign from the function of a retired prosecutor, therefore the Speaker of the Sejm, Grzegorz Schetyna, terminated his parliamentary mandate, considering that the law prohibits combining these two functions. Bogdan Święczkowski appealed against this decision to the Supreme Court, which dismissed the appeal. On 14 November 2011, the Sejmik of the Silesian Voivodeship expired his mandate as a councillor of the chamber. In January 2012, his complaint against this decision was rejected by the Provincial Administrative Court in Gliwice. In the same year, Bogdan Święczkowski supported the creation of United Poland.

On 24 November 2015, he was appointed Undersecretary of State in the Ministry of Justice. On 7 March 2016, he was appointed to the position of the national prosecutor and the first deputy prosecutor general.

In 2019, he took the position of the chairman of the Scientific Council established by the Minister of Justice of the Institute of Economic and Financial Expertise in Łódź.

On 26 January 2022, he was nominated as a judge of the Constitutional Tribunal. On 8 February 2022 the Sejm elected him as Judge. On 16 February 2022, he took the oath before the President of the Republic of Poland Andrzej Duda. He was suspended as president of the Constitutional Tribunal on 30 October 2026. Justice Minister Waldemar Żurek claimed that Święczkowski and his deputy had been preventing judges from performing their duties.
