= Ryszard Piotrowski =

Polish resistance fighter

Ryszard Feliks Piotrowski
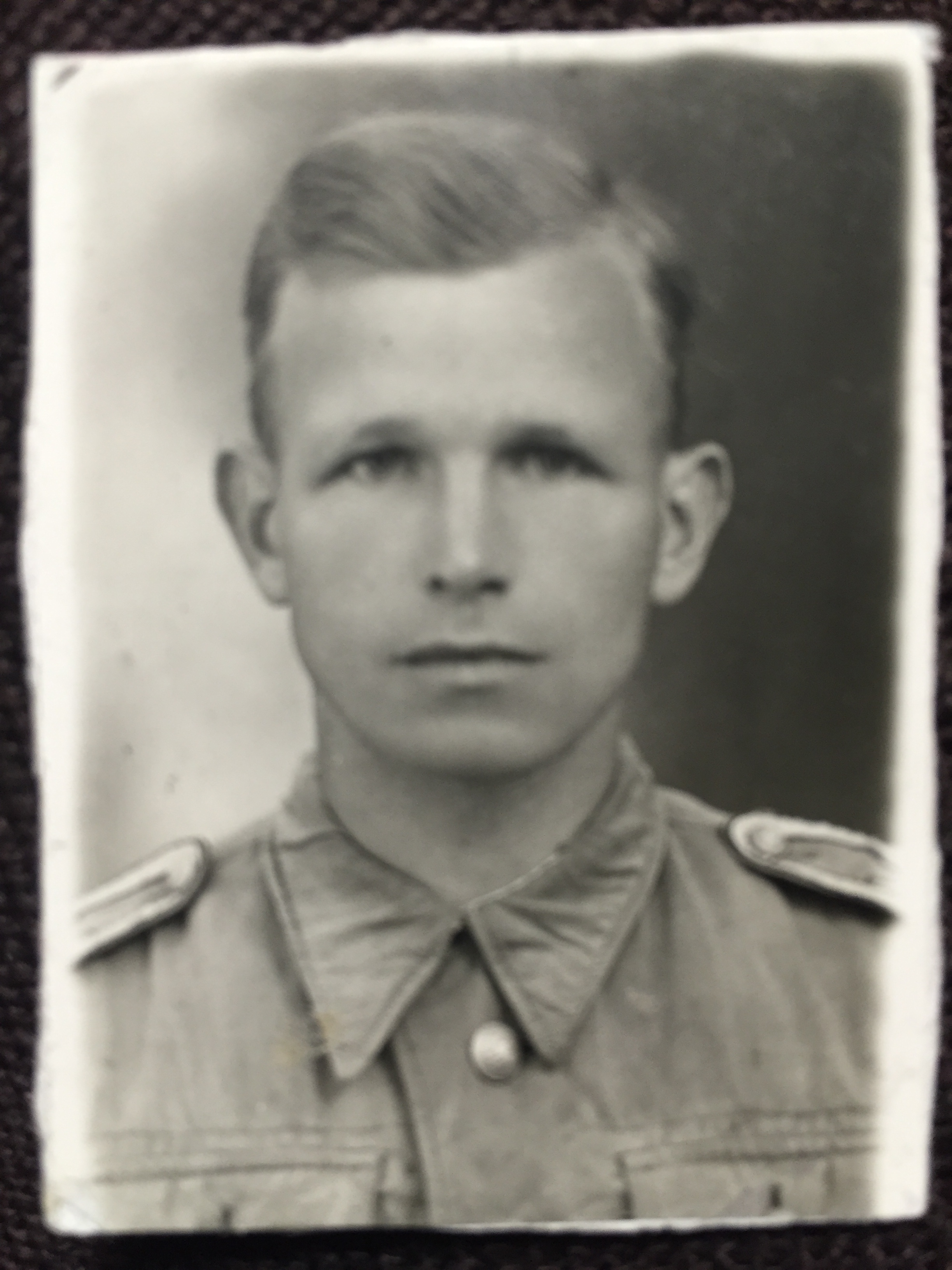
- Born: 6 February 1924; Warsaw, Poland
- Died: 2 June 2016 (aged 92)
- Title: Major
- Spouse: Teodora "Tonia" Piotrowska (née Starostka)
- Children: 3
- Parent(s): Feliks and Eugenia (née Truszkowska)
- Call sign: Piorun (in English 'lightning')
- Awards: Order of Polonia Restituta; Cross of the Warsaw Uprising; Warsaw Cross of the Uprising; Partisan Cross; Cross of Valor

Ryszard Feliks Piotrowski (English: Richard Felix Piotrowski; 6 February 1924 – 2 June 2016) was a Major in the Polish Armed Forces and a member of the Polish resistance / Home Army (Armia Krajowa or "AK"). He fought in the "Sowinski" Battalion, "Waligora" Grouping, under his wartime code name Piorun (meaning 'lightning').

== Biography ==
Piotrowski was born on 6 February 1924 in Warsaw. He took part in the Warsaw Uprising, the largest single military effort taken by any European resistance movement during World War II and the largest scale World War II operation by the Home Army (Polish: Armia Krajowa) to liberate Warsaw from Nazi Germany. The Uprising was timed to coincide with the Soviet Union's Red Army approaching the eastern suburbs of the city and the retreat of German forces. However, the Soviet advance purposefully stopped short, enabling the Germans to regroup and demolish the city while defeating the Polish resistance, which Piotrowski fought in for 63 days with little outside support.

After a 63-day fight, Piotrowski was captured and sent to the first of 5 camps he would be imprisoned at; Lamsdorf, a German prisoner of war camp which housed Polish prisoners from the German September 1939 offensive. More than 100,000 prisoners from Australia, Belgium, Britain, Canada, France, Greece, New Zealand, the Netherlands, Poland, South Africa, the Soviet Union, Yugoslavia and the United States passed through this camp. He was later transferred to another German prisoner-of-war camp, Luckenwalde, located in Brandenburg, 52 kilometers (32 miles) south of Berlin. At its height in May 1944, a total of 48,600 POW's were registered there. Piotrowski was held there until the end of the war.

After the war, he studied economics and became a professional economist with Inco-Veritas S.A., a privately owned Polish chemical products consortium founded in 1947. A devout Christian, Piotrowski refused to join the newly formed communist party of Poland, the Polish United Workers' Party, making life even harder than it was for Poles at the time. As a result of his refusal to join the party, nearly all of the Piotrowski family's land, real estate and bank account holdings were confiscated and never returned by the government, at the time a satellite state of the Soviet Union.

On 25 August 1948, Piotrowski married Teodora "Tonia" Starostka. They had three children, Nina, Wanda and Aleksandra. Wanda died 17 days after being born. After 33 years of marriage, Tonia died on 13 October 1981, at the age of 56 from breast cancer.

Among the many orders, decorations and medals of Poland received by Piotrowski, in 2011, he was awarded the Order of Polonia Restituta (Polish: Order Odrodzenia Polski, English: Order of Rebirth of Poland), one of Poland's two highest decorations, awarded only to the most distinguished Poles and the highest-ranking representatives of foreign countries.

On 2 June 2016, Piotrowski died of complications from Alzheimer's disease.
