= Dziennik Ustaw =

Government gazette of Poland

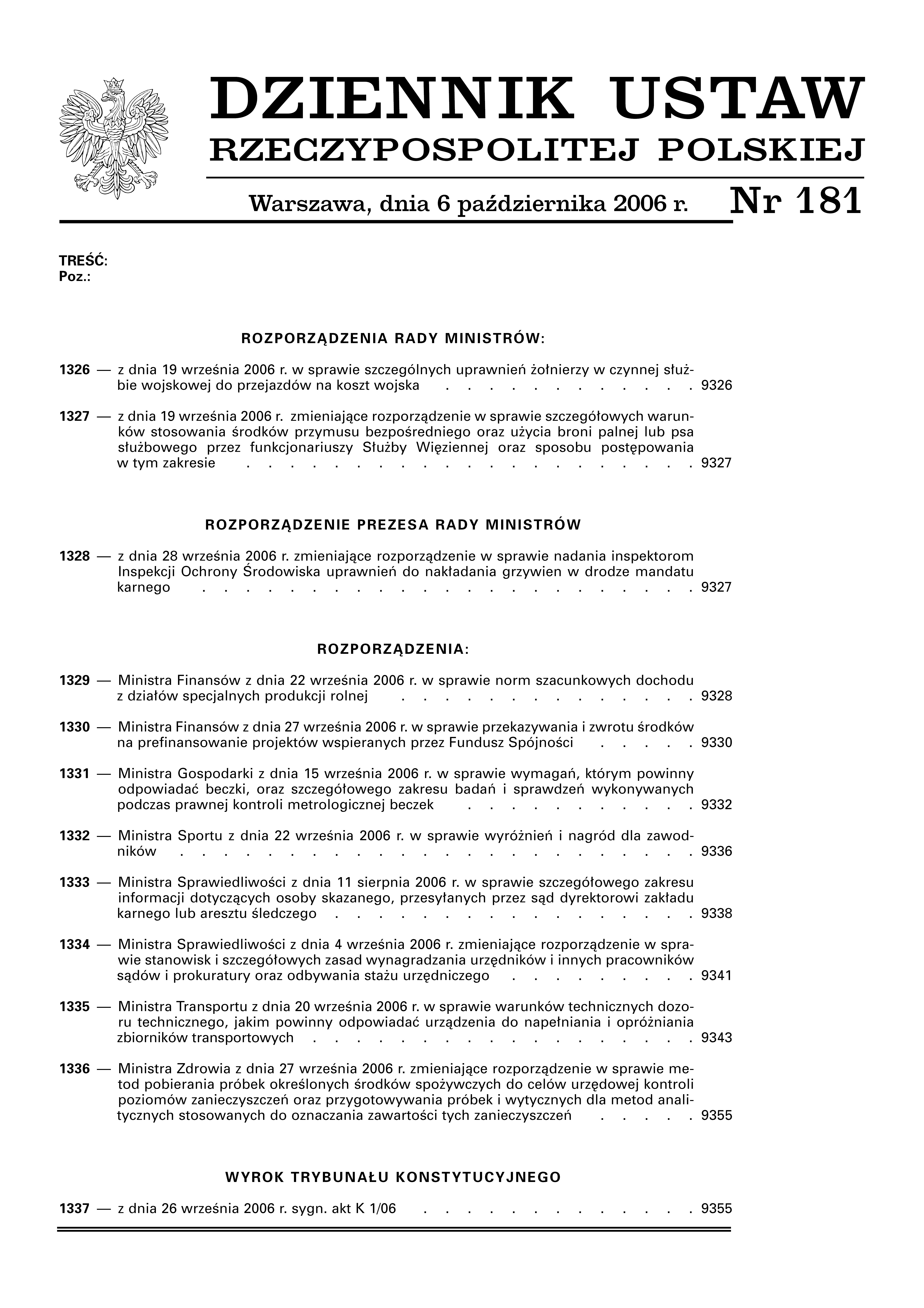
- Front page of Dziennik Ustaw, 2006
- Language: Polish
- Former name: Dziennik Praw Królestwa Polskiego
- ISO 4: Find out here

Indexing
- ISSN: 0867-3411
- OCLC no.: 470854338

Links
- Journal homepage

Dziennik Ustaw (Polish: [ˈd͡ʑɛn.ɲik ˈu.staf]) or Dziennik Ustaw Rzeczypospolitej Polskiej (transl. Journal of Laws of the Republic of Poland, abbreviated Dz. U.) is the most important Polish publication of legal acts. It is the only official source of law for promulgation of Polish laws. The publication of this journal is solely the responsibility of the Prime Minister of the Republic of Poland. Dziennik Ustaw traces its history to the 1918 Dziennik Praw Królestwa Polskiego (transl. Journal of Laws of the Kingdom of Poland) and has changed its name several times during its existence.

According to Article 122 of the Constitution of Poland of 1997, "The President of the Republic shall sign a bill within 21 days of its submission and shall order its promulgation in the Journal of Laws of the Republic of Poland (Dziennik Ustaw)". The matter is further regulated by articles 87 and 234 of the constitution, as well as by the Article 9 of the Act on Publishing Normative Acts and Several Other Legal Acts of 2000. Dziennik Ustaw includes such documents as:

- The Constitution
- Acts of the Sejm
- Regulations of the President, Council of Ministers, Prime Minister, ministers of administration, members of committees of the Council of Ministers and the National Council of Radio Broadcasting and Television
- Uniform acts and amendments
- Acts of ratification of international treaties and agreements
- Verdicts of the Constitutional Tribunal
- Acts of the Council of Ministers abolishing or amending ministerial regulations
- Legal acts related to states of war and peace treaties
- Legal acts approved by a referendum
- Ordinances regarding elections for the Sejm and Senate of Poland
- Ordinances regarding presidential elections
- Decisions of the Supreme Court of Poland regarding the validity of presidential elections, as well as elections for the Sejm and Senate, as well as on referendums
- Notices of errors in previously published laws and acts
- Other legal acts, as specified by specific acts of the Sejm

== See also ==
- Monitor Polski
