= Dariusz Szostek =

Polish judge (born 1973)

Dariusz Szostek (born 21 March 1973) is a Polish lawyer, and judge.

Szostek in 2026

== Youth and education ==
Szostek was born 21 March 1973, and graduated from the Faculty of Law and Administration of the University of Silesia. He obtained a postdoctoral degree in law at the Faculty of Law, Administration and Economics of the University of Wrocław in 2013.

== Judge ==
On 13 March 2026, the Sejm of the 10th term elected him as a judge of the Constitutional Tribunal. He was one of the six candidates submitted by the Presidium of the Sejm. On 1 April he was sworn in to his status in the tribunal in the presence of the President of Poland Karol Nawrocki. Szostek entered the tribunal building on 9 April and started his official duties.
