= Maciej Berek =

Polish politician (born 1972)

- Berek in 2026

Minister without portfolio
- In office 13 December 2023 – 14 August 2026
- Prime Minister: Donald Tusk

Personal details
- Born: 12 May 1972 (age 54)

Maciej Berek (born 12 May 1972) is a Polish lawyer and politician from 2023 to 2026, he served as the minister without portfolio. From 2008 to 2015, he served as secretary of the Council of Ministers.
