= Wykop.pl =

Polish online news aggregator and micro-blogging service

wykop.pl
- Owner: Wykop Sp. z o.o.
- Creator: Piotr Chmolowski
- Website: wykop.pl

wykop.pl ([ˈvɨ.kɔp ˈpɛ ˈɛl]) is a Polish social networking internet service, founded on December 28, 2005. It is modeled after the American website digg.com (wykop in the Polish language means a dig out). The basic idea behind wykop.pl is the collection of potentially interesting internet-based information and making them available to users.

ReadWriteWeb described wykop as a "clone" of Digg. As of 2006, Sebastian Kwiecień, owner of the blog web20.pl, said that it was probably Poland's most popular Web 2.0 website.

Other part of service is a microblog based on hashtag system, which can be subscribed.

Nicknames of users have different colors. After registration user's nick has green color, which after 30 days changes into orange color. Special colors are: claret for 1,000 users from the top of user ranking, blue for the sponsored users, black for the admins and silver for the banned users and users, which deleted their accounts.

== Statistics ==
According to data from April 2008 the service was getting 650,000 users monthly, of which around 30,000 were registered users. By September 2008 the number of visitors rose to 900,000, of which 60,000 were registered users, and there were 13 million views. Currently Wykop.pl has more than 110,000 registered users, 3.1 million unique visitors and around 58 million views.

== Trivia ==
- Wykop's microblogging service attracted notable people, e.g. Lech Wałęsa, Hanna Zdanowska, Przemysław Wipler. Wykop.pl is also often used to promote enterprises and media such as RMF24.pl, Radio Zet.
- Wykop.pl often organizes AMA (Ask Me Anything) sessions with famous people, e.g. Cezary Pazura, Jerzy Owsiak, Bohdan Smoleń, Krzysztof Hołowczyc, Tadeusz Sznuk
  - Before 2015 Polish presidential election some candidates participated in AMA events: Andrzej Duda, Janusz Korwin-Mikke, Adam Jarubas, Paweł Tanajno, Marian Kowalski and Janusz Palikot.
- Community of Wykop.pl organized real life meetings Wykop Party (8 editions) in large Polish cities.
- The most popular entry on Wykop was about 2021 polish independent media blackout protest, which has 19,048 votes (February 11, 2021).
- Service has also own Web radio station, Radio Wolne Mirko with auditions led by users. In the past there were also other Web radio stations related to the service, such as Mirko FM and WykopFM.
- In June 2015, users of Wykop took part in an action against the Polish death camps term, designing posters and billboards, reminding that Nazi concentration camps during World War II were not Polish, but German. Users wanted to set them in major Polish and European cities.

== Controversies ==
- In September 2009 database containing nicknames and hashed passwords of around 100,000 users was leaked.
- In early 2010s dozens of short movies claiming that Pope John Paul II was a child molester were uploaded to YouTube. Some of those clips were described as originating from Wykop.pl. In early 2011, the Łódź Voivodeship website was defaced with offensive and pornographic pictures of the Pope. Attackers claimed to be from Wykop. Shortly after this incident users from Wykop discovered that movies and pictures containing anti-papal content might be created on local mutation of 4chan, Karachan. Michał Białek, chairman of Wykop.pl, notified prosecutors about the hate campaign targeting the Pope and Wykop.pl.
- In May 2013, some users of Wykop found and uploaded naked photos of a female administrator, nicknamed Elfik32. Pictures were taken in a field of wheat. Moderators of Wykop banned users posting said photos. In response users started uploading and upvoting articles connected to grain, eventually flooding the main page. The incident was named grain scandal (afera zbożowa). A few days later, Elfik32 withdrew bans and apologized to banned users.
- A similar scandal happened in January 2015. Moderators removed heavily upvoted article about plans of privatization of National Forests by President of Poland, Bronisław Komorowski. Users reacted and for some time main page consisted of nothing but articles connected to forests. The protest was named forest scandal (afera leśna).
- In December 2018, PurePC.pl reported that anonymous users added child sexual abuse material to the website; Wykop.pl reported the content to authorities.
- The problem related to child sexual abuse materials has not been resolved for the next 3 years and users reporting it were either banned or ignored.
