= Kotarbiński =

Kotarbiński (feminine: Kotarbińska; plural: Kotarbińscy) is a Polish surname.

- Janina Kotarbińska (1901–1997), Polish philosopher and logician, PhD supervisor of Leszek Nowak
- Józef Kotarbiński (1849–1928), Polish theorist, actor and director of Juliusz Słowacki Theatre, brother of Miłosz
- Julia Kotarbińska (1895–1979), Polish ceramist and academic at Eugeniusz Geppert Academy of Fine Arts
- Mieczysław Kotarbiński (1890–1943), Polish painter and graphic artist, designed Cross of Independence
- Miłosz Kotarbiński (1854–1944), Polish painter, literary critic, poet, singer and composer, brother of Józef and father of Tadeusz Kotarbiński
- Tadeusz Kotarbiński (1886–1981), Polish philosopher, logician and ethicist, son of Miłosz
- Wilhelm Kotarbiński (1848–1921), Polish artist and painter of historical and fantastical subjects
