= Marian Kowalski =

Marian Kowalski may refer to:

- Marian Albertovich Kowalski (1821–1884), Polish-Russian astronomer
- Marian Kowalski (politician) (born 1964), Polish political activist, columnist and former bodybuilder
