= Polish Constitutional Tribunal crisis (2015–2016) =

Political conflict in Poland

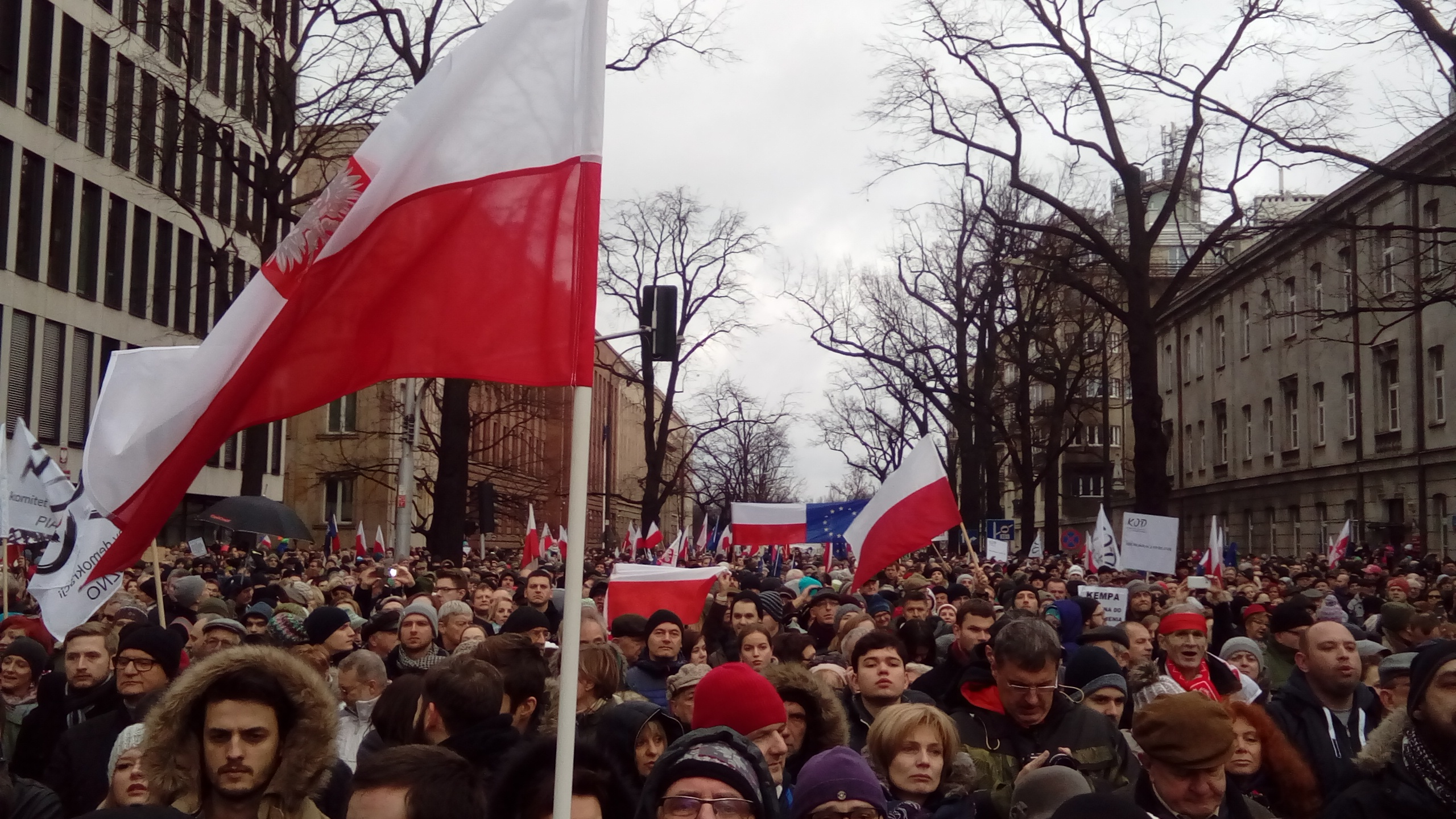
A Committee for the Defence of Democracy protest in Warsaw against Poland's new government, 12 December 2015

The Polish Constitutional Tribunal crisis was a conflict in Poland starting in the second half of 2015 with the appointment of five of the 15 judges of the Constitutional Tribunal.

In Poland, constitutional judges must be elected by the Lower House, and must take an oath of office before the President. In 2015, the governing Civic Platform (Platforma Obywatelska, PO) party lost both the presidential election and the parliament (Sejm) majority to the Law and Justice party (Prawo i Sprawiedliwość, PiS), which won an unprecedented absolute majority of seats. After the new (eighth) Sejm was seated on 12 November 2015 and the new president of Poland, Andrzej Duda, assumed office on 6 August 2015, the judicial branch would be left as the only branch of the government of Poland not under the control of PiS provided that the due seat replacements were made in advance.

The terms of three constitutional court judges were due to end after the 25 October election but before the new (eighth) Sejm was seated on 12 November 2015. In advance of the 12 November seating of the eighth Sejm, PO attempted to elect five judges to the Constitutional Tribunal, including two whose terms would begin in the month after 12 November, but the new President Duda refused to let any of them take their oaths of office. After PiS took power, they nominated a different set of five judges who were immediately sworn in. Three (Note: Henryk Cioch, Lech Morawski, and Mariusz Muszyński) were nominated on 2 December 2015 and two others (Note: Piotr Pszczółkowski and Julia Przyłębska) were nominated the following week. Of the five appointments made by PO, the Constitutional Tribunal itself accepted the first three appointments (Note: Roman Hauser, Krzysztof Ślebzak, and Andrzej Jakubecki) and invalidated the last two. (Note: Bronisław Sitek and Andrzej Sokala) Consequently, of the five appointments made by PiS after the election, the Tribunal accepted the last two PiS appointments and invalidated the first three. As none of the five PO appointments were sworn in by the president, this ruling was disputed by the new PiS government, which went on to change the statutes regulating the Court in order to ensure that all five of its nominees sit, thereby furthering its influence on the court – the only remaining branch of government not under PiS control.

The President of the Constitutional Tribunal dictated that the new five judges should not hear cases until the situation was settled; in order to combat this, PiS passed a series of laws through the Sejm and Senate which compelled the Constitutional Tribunal to allow the judges to hear new cases. The new legislation was signed into law on 28 December 2015. In January 2016, the court ruled the five new judges elected by the 8th Sejm were legally appointed, but in March 2016 ruled the new legislation unconstitutional. The latter ruling was ignored by the Polish government, which considered the ruling "advisory". The executive and legislative branches' refusal to accept this ruling of the judicial branch thus caused a constitutional crisis. The crisis provoked outrage in the European Union which began an investigation into Poland under Article 7 of the Treaty on European Union, describing the situation as threatening the rule-of-law.

The appointments and amendments caused domestic protests and counter-protests in December 2015 and January 2016; one of the most significant outcomes was the creation of the Committee for the Defence of Democracy protest movement.

The law changes were criticized by the European Commission as threatening the "rule of law" and the human rights of Polish citizens. As of 20 December 2017, the crisis had, according to the European Commission, extended to include "13 laws affecting the entire structure of the justice system in Poland". These changes to the court system precipitated a wider rule-of-law crisis, causing disagreement with the EU and including rollbacks to abortion in Poland.

The 2023 Polish parliamentary election saw Civic Platform (Platforma Obywatelska, PO) oust PiS from government, returning to power with the help of its coalition partners. In a reversal of the crisis, the new majority in the Sejm passed a resolution confirming the illegal status of some Constitutional Tribunal justices, and the fact that the President of the Constitutional Tribunal was never properly appointed. The resolution rendered all of the court's rulings since the start of the crisis null, allowing state organs to ignore them. The move was met with outcry and accusations of unconstitutionality by the largest opposition party Law and Justice, despite the dubious constitutionality of its own actions in beginning the original crisis.

The European Commission cheered the new government's work, unlocking funds from the Recovery Package that were blocked due to the previous government's actions. It also suggested that the Article 7 procedure against Poland could be lifted in the future.

== Events ==
List of TC judges by seniority in June 2015, at the onset of the crisis
No	Judge	(Note: The colors only represent the majorities that elected each judge, as the Polish constitution of 1997 mandates that judges shall be independent and shall not belong to any political party (Article 195).)	Nomination date	End of term
1	Maria Gintowt-Jankowicz		6 November 2006	6 November 2015
2	Wojciech Hermeliński		6 November 2006	6 November 2015
3	Marek Kotlinowski		6 November 2006	6 November 2015
4	Zbigniew Cieślak		2 December 2006	2 December 2015
5	Teresa Liszcz		8 December 2006	8 December 2015
6	Mirosław Granat		27 April 2007	27 April 2016
7	Andrzej Rzepliński (President)		19 December 2007	19 December 2016
8	Stanisław Biernat (vice-president)		26 June 2008	26 June 2017
9	Sławomira Wronkowska-Jaśkiewicz		6 May 2010	6 May 2019
10	Stanisław Rymar		3 December 2010	3 December 2019
11	Piotr Tuleja		3 December 2010	3 December 2019
12	Marek Zubik		3 December 2010	3 December 2019
13	Małgorzata Pyziak-Szafnicka		5 January 2011	5 January 2020
14	Andrzej Wróbel		29 May 2011	29 May 2020
15	Leon Kieres		23 July 2012	23 July 2021
Nominated by PiS or its coalition partners (2006–2007)
Nominated by PO or its coalition partners (2007–2015)

=== Partisan struggle over Court composition ===
The Polish presidential election, held in May 2015, gave candidate Andrzej Duda, backed by Law and Justice (PiS), a surprise victory over incumbent President Bronisław Komorowski, backed by the Civic Platform (PO), which was the then-government's major party.

President-elect Duda was set to take office in August 2015. Coincidentally, a parliamentary election was also due to be held in October. Opinion polls were now showing that PO was likely to lose to PiS., meaning PO could lose both government and Presidency to PiS, within five months.

Judges of the Constitutional Tribunal are nominated by the Lower House, meaning that the partisan influence of the judicial branch was also in play. At the start of the events, 9 of the 15 members had been nominated by PO and its allies during their two terms in government (Tusk Cabinet), while the remaining 6 had been nominated in 2006 and 2007 by PiS and its allies (Kaczyński Cabinet), and they were the most senior: five of them were due to be replaced in late 2015 (see table).

The Constitution mandates that judges are "chosen individually by the Sejm for a term of office of 9 years" (Article 194), but it does not specify what happens when a seat is vacant when the Sejm is itself in recess (during the campaign and before the oaths of office)

The 7th Sejm's session lasted from 8 November 2011 to 11 November 2015, and its last meeting was held on 8–9 October 2015. The election of the 8th Sejm was held on 25 October, and the oaths of office were taken starting 12 November.

=== First contended nominations by the Civic Platform ===
On 25 June 2015, the PO government and parliament adopted a new law regarding the constitutional court. Later, the Constitutional Tribunal found this law to be partly unconstitutional. It was signed by President Bronisław Komorowski on 21 July 2015 (about one month before end of his presidency).

On 8 October 2015, 17 days before the elections, the outgoing Polish Parliament's last meeting was opened. The Sejm elected five new judges. Three of them replaced judges whose nine-year terms were to expire on 6 November (12 days after the elections, but 5 days before the end of the legislature), while two were to replace judges whose terms were due to expire in December.

The judges were chosen on the basis of a law passed earlier in the summer, by the PO-controlled Sejm.

If the judges appointed by PO had taken their seats on the Tribunal, the result would have been that 14 out of 15 Constitutional Tribunal judges would have been selected by the Civic Platform. However, the new President of Poland, Andrzej Duda, refused to swear in these judges stating that they had been chosen "in contravention of democratic principles".

=== Second contended nominations by Law and Justice ===
On 25 October, the Law and Justice (Prawo i Sprawiedliwość, PiS) party won an unprecedented absolute majority of seats in the Polish parliamentary election. On 16 November, new Prime Minister Beata Szydło and her Cabinet took office.

On 19 November 2015 the newly-seating 8th Sejm passed an amendment to the existing law, and mandated the appointment of five new judges, set term limits for the president and vice president of the court, and stipulated term limits for two sitting judges. The president, Andrzej Duda, signed the amendment on 20 November, but the law was challenged at the Constitutional Tribunal.

On 2 December, the Sejm elected five new judges to the 15-member tribunal, claiming it would prevent the previously appointed five from taking office; these were sworn into office by President Duda in a closed ceremony held after midnight. PiS delegates argued that the previous appointments made by PO contradicted existing law and the Polish constitution.

On 3 December, the Constitutional Court ruled that out of the five judges elected by PO, the election of the first three judges was valid, while the appointment of the other two breached the law. But President Duda refused to swear any into office. According to his spokesman, Duda refused to swear these three judges into office, because the number of Constitutional Court judges would then be unconstitutional.

On 4 December, Law and Justice leader Jarosław Kaczyński, who had called the Constitutional Court "the bastion of everything in Poland that is bad" questioned the legitimacy of the Court's decision, because it was supposedly made by fewer judges than required by law. Kaczyński announced changes in the law regarding the Constitutional Court, but gave no details.

On 11 January 2016, the Constitutional Court rejected a complaint by Civic Platform questioning the appointment of the five new judges by the new Parliament. Three of the Court's judges dissented, including Andrzej Rzepliński.

=== Inclusion of the new judges ===
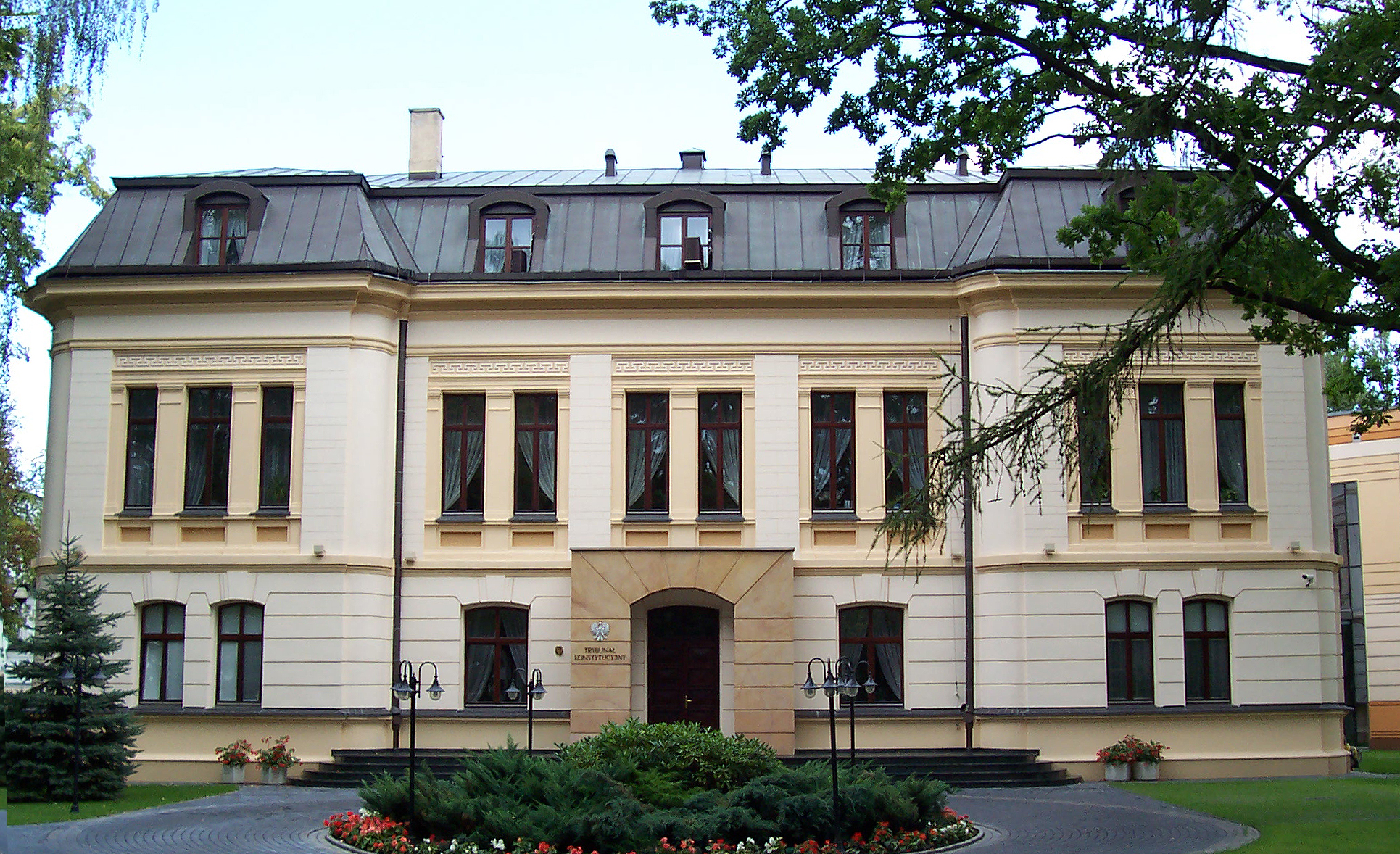
The Constitutional Court building in Warsaw

Early in December, the Tribunal's President Andrzej Rzepliński, who had been nominated by PO, said the 5 judges nominated by PiS were given offices in the building, but would not rule until the issue was "cleared up". Because the Polish law set a participatory threshold of 9 judges, this meant that they were de facto excluded.

The Constitution leaves the door open for the specific organization of the Tribunal: "The organization of the Constitutional Tribunal, as well as the mode of proceedings before it, shall be specified by statute." (Article 197)

On 22 December 2015, the Sejm passed a law which re-organized the Constitutional Tribunal:

- In order to enforce the inclusion of the newly elected judges, the new law introduced the mandatory participation of at least 13, instead of 9, of the 15 judges.
- In order to ensure that the new judges would not be cornered into permanent minority, the new law also set a two-thirds majority. Article 190 (5) of the Polish constitution requires the "majority" of votes. The new law specifies it to mean a qualified majority.
- For fear that the new laws passed by the PiS majority would be blocked for years by the Tribunal, the new law binds it to handle the cases according to the date of receipt. Pending constitutional proceedings had previously to wait for six months, or under exceptional circumstances for three months.
- Judges of the Constitutional Tribunal can be dismissed on request of the majority of the Sejm, the President or the Ministry of Justice.

The bill was approved by the Polish Senate on 24 December 2015 after an overnight session, and signed by President Duda on 28 December 2015.

The Washington Post quoted an official saying that as a result, the decision-making capacity of the court has been "paralysed".

On 9 March 2016, the Constitutional Tribunal, sitting without the new judges, ruled the amendments non-compliant with the Polish constitution. The PiS government regarded this verdict as non-binding, as it was not itself based on the rules introduced by the amendment, and refused to publish the verdict, a binding condition for its legal validity.

== Domestic reaction ==
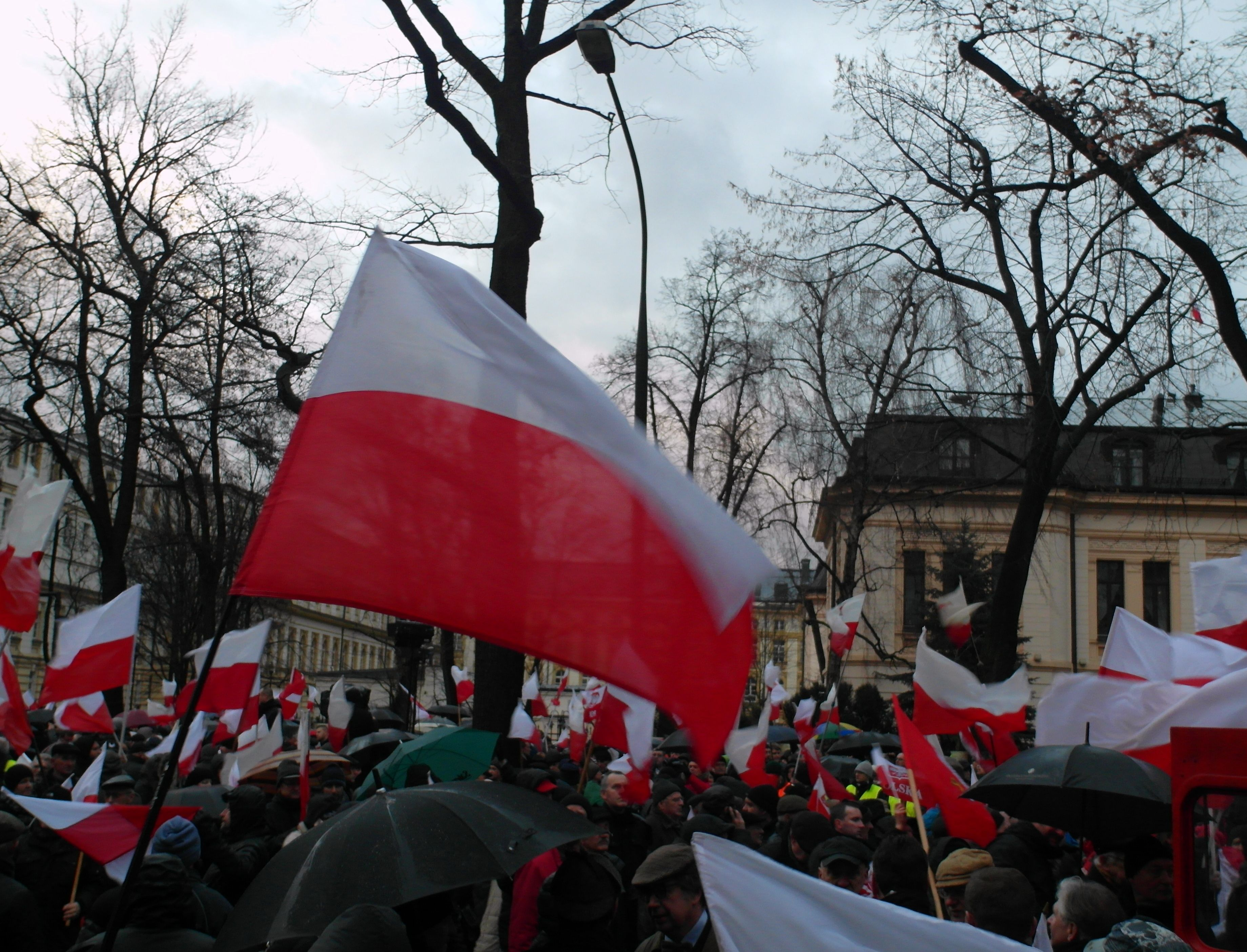
A pro-government Law and Justice rally in support of the new Constitutional Tribunal legislation, 13 December 2015

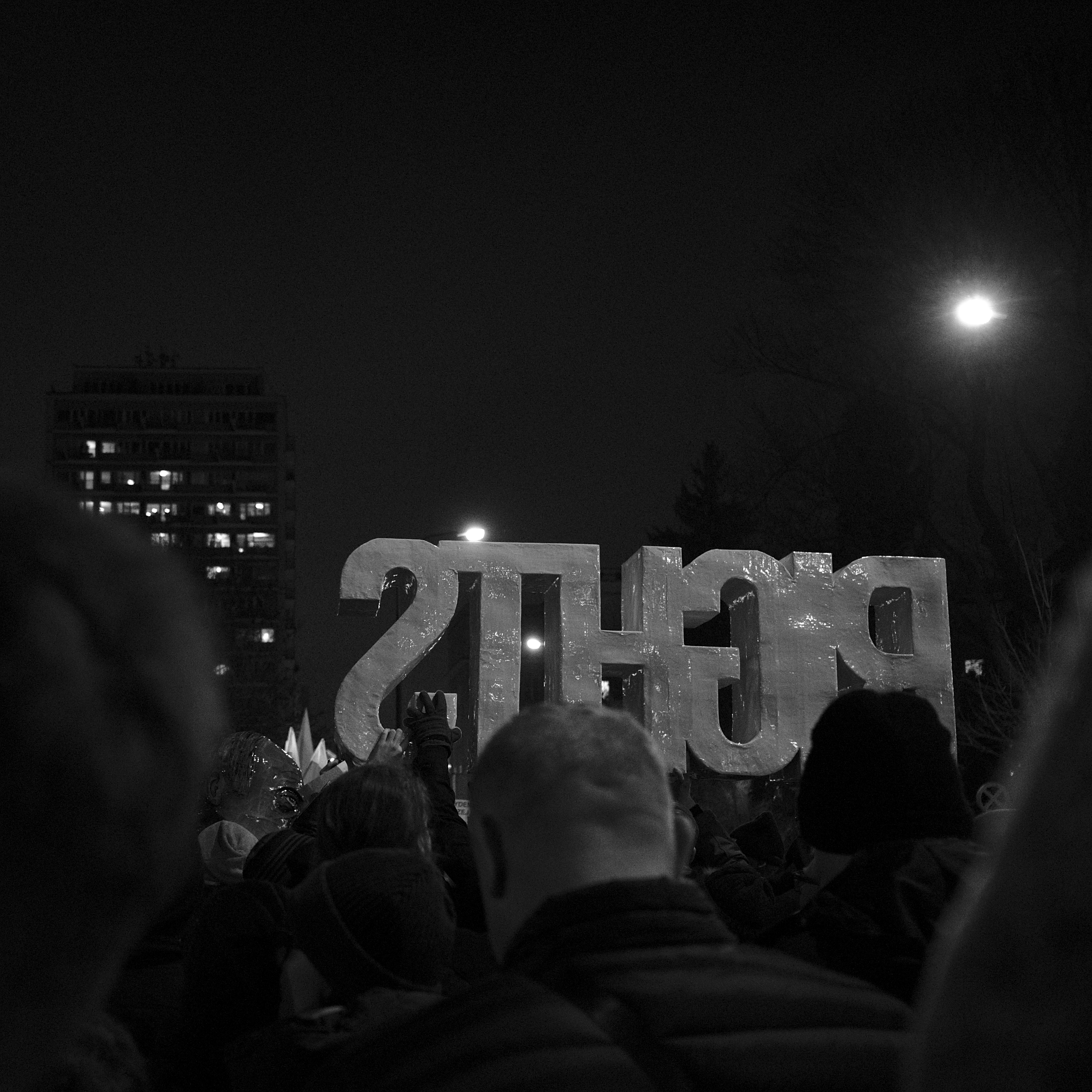
A demonstration opposing the new Constitutional Tribunal legislation, organized by the Left Together (Razem), Warsaw, 3 December 2015

On 2 December 2015, Jacek Kucharczyk, the director of the Institute of Public Affairs, Poland in Warsaw, was quoted as saying that the constitutional court "was the one branch of government that they (PiS) theoretically couldn't touch and which curbed its power 10 years ago".

On 12 December, protests organised by the Committee for the Defence of Democracy were joined by a crowd of supporters (estimated at 50,000 by the event organisers and 17,000-20,000 according to the official police report) in Warsaw. The next day, pro-government supporters rallied in the capital (estimated at 80,000 by the event organisers and 40,000-45,000 based on the official police report). The Supreme Court of Poland and the Polish Lawyers Association view the amendment as a breach of Article 190 and as unconstitutional.

Lech Wałęsa, former President of Poland and leader of the Solidarity movement in the 1980s, stated that the current situation might lead to a civil war and that the way in which PiS was proceeding did not amount to an "open and democratic" reform process. Wałęsa called for a referendum on the latest changes of law. "This government acts against Poland, against our achievements, freedom, democracy, not to mention the fact that it ridicules us in the world...I'm ashamed to travel abroad."

On 5 January 2016, Leszek Miller, a former Prime Minister of Poland criticised Western, especially German, media, and other critics of PiS, saying that they were "hysterical" and that there was nothing to indicate a "coup", as PiS was simply regaining power from the Civic Platform. Miller accused the chief judge of the Constitutional Court Andrzej Rzepliński of acting like a "politician of Civic Platform".

In an open letter published on 25 April 2016, the former Presidents of Poland, Lech Wałęsa, Aleksander Kwaśniewski and Bronisław Komorowski, called on the Polish public to defend democracy, and warned that "Law and Justice plans to continue their actions, which destroy the constitutional order, paralyze the proceedings of the Constitutional Tribunal and the entire judicial system." The same week Poland's Supreme Court announced that it regards the verdicts of the Constitutional Tribunal as binding even though these decisions were not published by the Government, as "technically" required by the Polish Constitution. In response PiS spokeswoman Beata Mazurek called the Supreme Court's statement the result of "a meeting of a team of cronies who are defending the status quo of the previous governing camp."

=== Confirmation of the illegal status of the Constitutional Tribunal by the tenth Sejm ===
On 6 March 2024, the Sejm adopted a directive “on eliminating the effects of the 2015–2023 constitutional crisis within the framework of the activities of the Constitutional Tribunal”, in which it declaring the United Right's legislation on the tribunal to be “in flagrant violation of the law, in particular the Constitution of the Republic of Poland and the Convention for the Protection of Human Rights and Fundamental Freedoms”. However, the government was unable to change the existing laws on the tribunal because of the opposition of President Andrzej Duda. The new president who was elected in the 2025 Polish presidential election, Karol Nawrocki, likewise opposed the government's attempts to do so. Because of this, the government resorted to copying United Right's strategy from 2016 in which it refused to publish the tribunal's rulings in Dziennik Ustaw in order to deprive them of their effects.

== International reactions ==
=== Brussels ===
On 15 December 2015, Martin Schulz, President of the European Parliament, described the political situation in Poland as dramatic, with the latest actions of the Polish government having "characteristics of a coup". Schulz explicitly refused to withdraw this appraisal after protests by the Polish Prime Minister Beata Szydło and Minister of Foreign Affairs Witold Waszczykowski. On 10 January 2016, Schulz was quoted as describing the situation in Poland as a "Putinisation" of European politics; and he was backed by Viviane Reding, who complained about attacks on the public and private media in line with "the Putin-Orbán-Kaczynski-Logic".

The European Commission Vice President Frans Timmermans wrote in a letter to Poland's ministers of Justice and Foreign Affairs before Christmas, that the EU's executive body "attaches great importance to preventing the emergence of situations whereby the rule of law in (a) member state could be called into question", and that he "would expect that this law is not finally adopted or at least not put into force until all questions regarding the impact of this law on the independence and the functioning of the Constitutional Tribunal have been fully and properly assessed."

Anne Brasseur, President of the Parliamentary Assembly of the Council of Europe, called on Polish politicians "not to enact, precipitously, legislation relating to the Constitutional Tribunal which may seriously undermine the rule of law."

On 13 January 2016, the European Commission launched a formal rule-of-law assessment to determine a serious threat of a breach of Union law based on rules set out in 2014 and the provisions of Article 7 of the Treaty on European Union, regarding the amendments of the constitutional court and the public media law in Poland. A recommendation, the second step in the rule-of-law assessment, was issued on 1 June 2016. Iverna McGowan, director of Amnesty International's European Institutes office in Brussels, commented: "The willingness of the commission to use the rule-of-law framework is a positive step towards a more serious approach by the EU to speak out and hold its own member states to account on their human rights records." Hungary declared that it will oppose any sanctions against Poland.

On 11 March 2016, the Council of Europe's Venice Commission, who had been asked for an opinion by the Polish government in December 2015, assessed the amendments as crippling the Court's effectiveness and undermining democracy, human rights and the rule of law. On 13 April 2016 the European Parliament, by 513 votes to 142 and with 30 abstentions, passed a resolution declaring that the Parliament "is seriously concerned that the effective paralysis of the Constitutional Tribunal in Poland endangers democracy, human rights and the rule of law".

In September 2017, the European Commission launched the second stage of infringement over the state of rule of law in Poland.

On 20 December 2017, the commission made a fourth recommendation and referred Poland to the European Court of Justice for "breach of EU law", stating,

Over a period of two years, the Polish authorities have adopted more than 13 laws affecting the entire structure of the justice system in Poland, impacting the Constitutional Tribunal, Supreme Court, ordinary courts, National Council for the Judiciary, prosecution service and National School of Judiciary. The common pattern is that the executive and legislative branches have been systematically enabled to politically interfere in the composition, powers, administration and functioning of the judicial branch.

— European Commission

=== Eastern Europe ===
On 8 January 2016, Viktor Orbán, the Prime Minister of Hungary, declared that Hungary would never agree to any sanctions against Poland, and would veto any proposals to do so in EU. Orbán declared, "The European Union should not think about applying any sort of sanctions against Poland because that would require full unanimity and Hungary will never support any sort of sanctions against Poland". Under current EU law, to sanction any member state, all other member states must give their supporting vote in the European Council. On the same day Tibor Navracsics, the Hungarian EU commissioner, confirmed that Hungary would block any attempts to put Poland under any EU supervision or sanctions, denying claims by the German press that Hungary would allow sanctions to take place.

On 19 January 2016, Petr Mach, Member of the European Parliament for Czech Republic, put on a badge saying "I am a Pole" to show his support for law reforms in Poland. He expressed his disappointment with actions taken against Poland and accused the European Commission of hiding its real motivation: "We are faced with a scandalous situation in which the European Union has initiated proceedings against Poland to strip it of its voting rights. Yet, what is the terrible thing that Poland has done? That it has established a two-thirds majority for Constitutional Court decisions? (...) This is, of course, ridiculous and an excuse. What is it really that bothers the European Commission? The European Commission is upset about the fact that the winning party in the Polish election doesn't like the EU in the current form. It doesn't want to accept the dictate of migrant quotas. I think that is what this is about. This is scandalous interference in the internal affairs of a sovereign country. In 1963, John F. Kennedy declared in a Berlin under siege: "Ich bin ein Berliner!". I think that now we need to stand behind Poland. And as a proud free citizen let me say: Jestem Polakiem [I am a Pole]!"

On 9 March 2018, after Poland's referral to the ECJ, leaders of the Baltic states expressed their support for law reform in Poland. Lithuania's Prime Minister Saulius Skvernelis expressed understanding for law changes in Poland: "we understand Poland, we understand its goals related to the reform of the justice system (...) if there were any restrictive measures imposed on Poland, Lithuania would support Poland". The Prime Minister of Latvia Māris Kučinskis said: "We would be against any punishments imposed on Poland; in this regard, all three Baltic countries think similarly". Estonian Prime Minister Jüri Ratas said that "Any problems related to voting and taking away the right to vote – I do not think that it should happen at all, it would be a step too far".

On 13 September 2018, Lithuanian Foreign Minister, Linas Antanas Linkevičius has re-confirmed Lithuania's stand: "We will oppose the sanctions against Poland. This dialogue is very complicated but we believe that the result will be positive. Our neighbours also want to improve relations with the European Union in the context of the rule of law. Ultimatums and strong reactions will not help to solve this issue".

=== Western Europe ===
On 9 January, Volker Kauder and Herbert Reul, both leading members of the large German CDU party, called for economic sanctions on Poland. Two days later, the press spokesman for the German government, Steffen Seibert, denied that this was the position of the German government and stated that sanctions were not in fact being considered. German European MP Hans-Olaf Henkel from the fringe conservative Alliance for Progress and Renewal party criticized German interference in Polish internal affairs.

On 10 January, the Polish Foreign Ministry summoned the German ambassador, asking him to explain "anti-Polish statements by German politicians".

=== Washington ===
On 15 January Standard & Poor's downgraded Poland's rating from A− to BBB+ because, according to a S&P spokesman, "the downgrade reflects our view that Poland's system of institutional checks and balances has been eroded significantly. Poland's new government has initiated various legislative measures that we consider weaken the independence and effectiveness of key institutions, as reflected in our institutional assessment." Fitch Ratings reaffirmed Poland's A− rating, stating that Poland's outlook was stable with "strong macro performance, resilient banking system and governance indicators".

In a letter addressed to Beata Szydło, US Senators John McCain, Ben Cardin and Richard J. Durbin protested against the amendments which would "threaten the independence of state media and the country's highest court and undermine Poland's role as a democratic model for other countries in the region still going through difficult transitions" and could "serve to diminish democratic norms, including the rule of law and independence of the judiciary".

=== MEPs ===
On 13 September 2017, Nigel Farage, British populist nationalist politician, openly attacked the European Commission in the EU parliament by saying: "Indeed, the way you are treating Poland and Hungary already must remind them of living under the Soviet Communists with your attempts to tell them how they should run their own countries. All I can say is: Thank God we are leaving! You've learned nothing from Brexit."

On 28 February 2018, British politician Nigel Farage weighed in again on the issue: "I am always hearing about human rights, democracy and the rule of law, and yet in 2011, when journalists in Poland were being apprehended, held and sacked for being critical of the Government, what did the Commission do? Nothing. Why? Well, of course, because Mr Tusk, as the then Prime Minister, was pro the European Union. (...) here you are, Mr Timmermans – just because they tried to clear out the Communist old guard and modernise their system – on the verge of invoking Article 7 and taking away their democratic rights within the Union." Furthermore, Farage called the case of Catalonia: "And you are happy to interfere, Mr Timmermans, in every single Member State where you think you see an infringement, apart from – I had nearly forgotten – in the case of Catalonia. Nine hundred and fifty people get beaten up by the police because they want to turn out on a Sunday morning and express an opinion – a totally clear violation, Mr Timmermans, of people's human rights, an absolute abuse of any sense of a democratic process – yet you say, in that case, that it is none of our business. But, of course, they are a pro-EU Government, so the iron fist of the European Union is reserved purely for your critics." He finished with comparison to the Brezhnev Doctrine: "This, for Poland, is the modern-day Brezhnev doctrine of limited sovereignty. You rebelled against that system, Polish people, and I hope you go on and rebel against this one."

=== Domestic response to German and EU criticism ===
Prime Minister Beata Szydło vowed not to bow to German pressure, saying "these attacks are intended to weaken us, trying to show us that we should agree to everything just like our predecessors did". While German–Polish relations are important, Szydlo pointed out that they must be based on "partnership, not dominance, which our neighbour sometimes tries to exert".

Bishop Wiesław Mering called Schulz's comments a "lost chance to stay quiet" (referring to infamous speech by French President Jacques Chirac telling Poland it "lost the chance to stay quiet" when expressing support for war against Iraq in 2003), "I know my country more than you do, I have lived in my homeland for 70 years, I can assure you that elections of the president and new government, are not evidence of a lack of democracy. Elections showed that our common citizens want change." Mering stated that the problem is in the fact that those who lost power are dissatisfied with the election result and are trying to use the European Parliament in their own interests.

In response to German calls for sanctions on Poland, Law and Justice MP Stanisław Pięta responded, "The people who elected Hitler of their own free will, those who bowed before Stalin (...) want to instruct us", "who today cannot provide safety to their own people", "cannot deal with Islamic terrorism", "They want to give us lessons? Let them not be ridiculous".

On 9 January 2016, Polish Minister of Justice Zbigniew Ziobro reacted to the proposal by German politician Günther Oettinger to sanction Poland in a letter criticising Oettinger for interfering in Polish internal affairs, while at the same time tolerating censorship over mass sexual attacks in Germany committed on New Year's Eve. In his reply to Frans Timmermans, Ziobro asked Timmermans "to exercise more restraint in instructing and cautioning the parliament and government of a sovereign and democratic state in the future, despite ideological differences that may exist between us, with you being of a left-wing persuasion."

Paweł Kukiz, the leader of the opposition party Kukiz'15, the third largest party in Poland, stated in reaction to Martin Schulz, "You should pay more attention to democracy in your own country. Because if—God forbid—another Hitler were to appear in your country and lead with him those several million "immigrants" that you are planning, then I suspect the SS will look like the Salvation Army in comparison. I apologise for such a brutal statement, but the Nazis murdered my grandfather in Auschwitz, and I don't want their grandchildren to teach me lessons about democracy."

A special meeting of all Polish parties represented in the Parliament was arranged by Prime Minister Szydlo on 12 January. The parliamentary leader of the Law and Justice Party, Ryszard Terlecki, declared that the meeting would be dedicated to statements by German politicians that have caused outrage among the Polish public, and that he hopes that all other parties will share that sentiment.

== See also ==
- 2015 Polish parliamentary election
- 2015 Polish presidential election
- Citizens of Poland (movement)
- Committee for the Defence of Democracy
- Constitution of Hungary
- Democratic backsliding
- History of Poland (1989–present)
- List of political parties in Poland
- Lists of Polish politicians
- Polish constitutional crisis
- Polish Supreme Court Disciplinary Chamber law
- Politics of Poland
- Protests against Polish judiciary reforms
