= Idealization (philosophy of science) =

Scientific models assumption of facts

In philosophy of science, idealization is the process by which scientific models assume facts about the phenomenon being modeled that are strictly false but make models easier to understand or solve. That is, it is determined whether the phenomenon approximates an "ideal case," then the model is applied to make a prediction based on that ideal case.

If an approximation is accurate, the model will have high predictive power; for example, it is not usually necessary to account for air resistance when determining the acceleration of a falling bowling ball, and doing so would be more complicated. In this case, air resistance is idealized to be zero. Although this is not strictly true, it is a good approximation because its effect is negligible compared to that of gravity.

Idealizations may allow predictions to be made when none otherwise could be. For example, the approximation of air resistance as zero was the only option before the formulation of Stokes' law allowed the calculation of drag forces. Many debates surrounding the usefulness of a particular model are about the appropriateness of different idealizations.

== Early use ==
Galileo used the concept of idealization in order to formulate the law of free fall. Galileo, in his study of bodies in motion, set up experiments that assumed frictionless surfaces and spheres of perfect roundness. The crudity of ordinary objects has the potential to obscure their mathematical essence, and idealization is used to combat this tendency.

The most well-known example of idealization in Galileo's experiments is in his analysis of motion. Galileo predicted that if a perfectly round and smooth ball were rolled along a perfectly smooth horizontal plane, there would be nothing to stop the ball (in fact, it would slide instead of roll, because rolling requires friction). This hypothesis is predicated on the assumption that there is no air resistance.

== Other examples ==
=== Mathematics ===
Geometry involves the process of idealization because it studies ideal entities, forms and figures. Perfect circles, spheres, straight lines and angles are abstractions that help us think about and investigate the world.

=== Science ===
An example of the use of idealization in physics is in Boyle's Gas Law: Given any x and any y, if all the molecules in y are perfectly elastic and spherical, possess equal masses and volumes, have negligible size, and exert no forces on one another except during collisions, then if x is a gas and y is a given mass of x which is trapped in a vessel of variable size and the temperature of y is kept constant, then any decrease of the volume of y increases the pressure of y proportionally, and vice versa.

In physics, people will often solve for Newtonian systems without friction. While we know that friction is present in actual systems, solving the model without friction can provide insights to the behavior of actual systems where the force of friction is negligible.

=== Social science ===
It has been argued by the "Poznań School" (in Poland) that Karl Marx used idealization in the social sciences (see the works written by Leszek Nowak). Similarly, in economic models individuals are assumed to make maximally rational choices. This assumption, although known to be violated by actual humans, can often lead to insights about the behavior of human populations.

In psychology, idealization refers to a defence mechanism in which a person perceives another to be better (or have more desirable attributes) than would actually be supported by the evidence. This sometimes occurs in child custody conflicts. The child of a single parent frequently may imagine ("idealize") the (ideal) absent parent to have those characteristics of a perfect parent. However, the child may find imagination is favorable to reality. Upon meeting that parent, the child may be happy for a while, but disappointed later when learning that the parent does not actually nurture, support and protect as the former caretaker parent had.

A notable proponent of idealization in both the natural sciences and the social sciences was the economist Milton Friedman. In his view, the standard by which we should assess an empirical theory is the accuracy of the predictions that that theory makes. This amounts to an instrumentalist conception of science, including social science. He also argues against the criticism that we should reject an empirical theory if we find that the assumptions of that theory are not realistic, in the sense of being imperfect descriptions of reality. This criticism is wrongheaded, Friedman claims, because the assumptions of any empirical theory are necessarily unrealistic, since such a theory must abstract from the particular details of each instance of the phenomenon that the theory seeks to explain. This leads him to the conclusion that "[t]ruly important and significant hypotheses will be found to have 'assumptions' that are wildly inaccurate descriptive representations of reality, and, in general, the more significant the theory, the more unrealistic the assumptions (in this sense)." Consistently with this, he makes the case for seeing the assumptions of neoclassical positive economics as not importantly different from the idealizations that are employed in natural science, drawing a comparison between treating a falling body as if it were falling in a vacuum and viewing firms as if they were rational actors seeking to maximize expected returns.

Against this instrumentalist conception, which judges empirical theories on the basis of their predictive success, the social theorist Jon Elster has argued that an explanation in the social sciences is more convincing when it 'opens the black box' — that is to say, when the explanation specifies a chain of events leading from the independent variable to the dependent variable. The more detailed this chain, argues Elster, the less likely it is that the explanation specifying that chain is neglecting a hidden variable that could account for both the independent variable and the dependent variable. Relatedly, he also contends that social-scientific explanations should be formulated in terms of causal mechanisms, which he defines as "frequently occurring and easily recognizable causal patterns that are triggered under generally unknown conditions or with indeterminate consequences." All this informs Elster's disagreement with rational-choice theory in general and Friedman in particular. On Elster's analysis, Friedman is right to argue that criticizing the assumptions of an empirical theory as unrealistic is misguided, but he is mistaken to defend on this basis the value of rational-choice theory in social science (especially economics). Elster presents two reasons for why this is the case: first, because rational-choice theory does not illuminate "a mechanism that brings about non-intentionally the same outcome that a superrational agent could have calculated intentionally", a mechanism "that would simulate rationality"; and second, because rational-choice explanations do not provide precise, pinpoint predictions, comparable to those of quantum mechanics. When a theory can predict outcomes that precisely, then, Elster contends, we have reason to believe that theory is true. Accordingly, Elster wonders whether the as-if assumptions of rational-choice theory help explain any social or political phenomenon.

=== Science education ===
In science education, idealized science can be thought of as engaging students in the practices of science and doing so authentically, which means allowing for the messiness of scientific work without needing to be immersed in the complexity of professional science and its esoteric content. This helps the student develop the mindset of a scientist as well as their habits and dispositions. Idealized science is especially important for learning science because of the deeply cognitively and materially distributed nature of modern science, where most science is done by larger groups of scientists. One example is a 2016 gravitational waves paper listing over a thousand authors and more than a hundred science institutions. By simplifying the content, students can engage in all aspects of scientific work and not just add one small piece of the whole project. Idealized Science also helps to dispel the notion that science simply follows a single set scientific method. Instead, idealized science provides a framework for the iterative nature of scientific work, the reliance on critique, and the social aspects that help continually guide the work.

== Limits on use ==
While idealization is used extensively by certain scientific disciplines, it has been rejected by others. For instance, Edmund Husserl recognized the importance of idealization but opposed its application to the study of the mind, holding that mental phenomena do not lend themselves to idealization.

Although idealization is considered one of the essential elements of modern science, it is nonetheless the source of continued controversy in the literature of the philosophy of science. For example, Nancy Cartwright suggested that Galilean idealization presupposes tendencies or capacities in nature and that this allows for generalization beyond what is the ideal case.

There is continued philosophical concern over how Galileo's idealization method assists in the description of the behavior of individuals or objects in the real world. Since the laws created through idealization (such as the ideal gas law) describe only the behavior of ideal bodies, these laws can only be used to predict the behavior of real bodies when a considerable number of factors have been physically eliminated (e.g. through shielding conditions) or ignored. Laws that account for these factors are usually more complicated and in some cases have not yet been developed.

== See also ==
- Spherical cow
