= Zygmunt Ziembiński =

Polish legal philosopher and logician

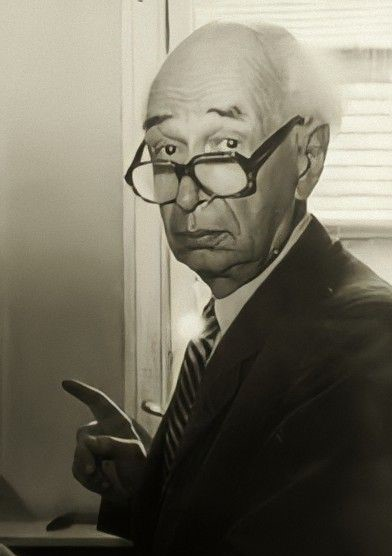
- Born: Zygmunt Ziembiński; June 1, 1920; Warsaw, Poland
- Died: May 19, 1996 (aged 75); Poznań, Poland
- Citizenship: Polish
- Education: University of Poznań (LL.D., 1949)
- Known for: theory of legal phenomena; advanced normative conception of sources of law; rules of exegesis of law
- Scientific career
- Fields: Law, logic, philosophy of law, sociology of law
- Workplaces: Adam Mickiewicz University (1946–1996)
- Thesis: Procesy o zniewagę jako problem techniki społecznej. (Defamation trials as a problem of social technology) (1949)
- Doctoral advisor: Czesław Znamierowski
- Doctoral students: Leszek Nowak; Sławomira Wronkowska-Jaśkiewicz
- Other notable students: Jan A.P. Kaczmarek; Filip Bajon

Signature
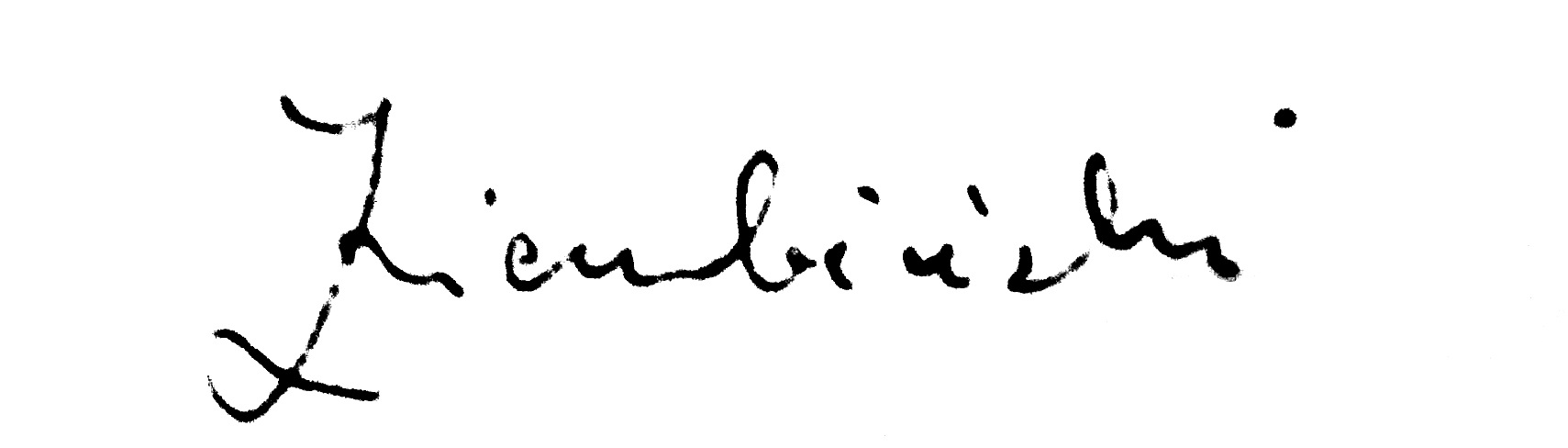

Zygmunt Ziembiński OPR (June 1, 1920 – May 19, 1996), usually cited as Z. Ziembinski, was a Polish legal philosopher, logician, and one of the most prominent theoreticians of law in Poland in the second half of the 20th century.

He was Professor of Jurisprudence at the Adam Mickiewicz University, where between 1981 and 1991 he chaired its Department of Legal Theory and Philosophy of Law. His most famous works are Practical Logic (Springer Netherlands, 1976) and Basic Problems of Jurisprudence (Polish Scientific Publishers PWN, 1980).

== Biography ==
=== Early life ===
Ziembiński was born in 1920, as the son of Maria Romiszewska and Zygmunt Sr., in Poland's capital, Warsaw. His father had a doctorate in psychology and worked as Director of Libraries of the Ministry of Religious Affairs and Public Education; his mother was a painter. He was educated at the Stanislaus Kostka Gymnasium in Warsaw (1938).

During his second year of college, at the outset of the Second World War, Ziembiński enlisted in the Home Army resistance movement, then received a commission as podporucznik in the 27th Home Army Infantry Regiment. He saw much action, taking part in the Silent Unseen's Operation Freston (1945).

=== Academic career ===
In 1947, he graduated in law from University of Poznań's Faculty of Law and Administration, having written Master of Jurisprudence (M.Jur.) thesis under the supervision of Czesław Znamierowski, who introduced Ziembiński to the field of Legal Theory and convinced him to major in the subject. In 1949 he completed his Master of Philosophy (M.Phil.) degree in sociology at the University of Poznań under the supervision of Kazimierz Ajdukiewicz. In 1949 he obtained a Doctor of Law (LL.D.) degree, writing a dissertation on the Defamation trials and social technology. He was awarded his docent position in 1955, and the professor ordinarius title in 1970. Additionally, in 1958, Ziembiński studied at the European University Centre, Nancy, France.

Ziembiński belongs to the Poznań school of legal theory and is known for developing a theory of law defined as a theory of legal phenomena, which covered both logical-linguistic as well as real aspects of law. The theory served as a base for the development of so-called normative concept of sources of law. Ziembiński defined law as a system of norms of conduct distinguishable from other social norms by determined formal features. Other ideas suggested by him were the differentiation between a legal norm and a legal provision, as well as the conception of two coupled norms and the notion of a norm of competence.

He was a member of the Polish Philosophical Society, Polish Sociological Association, Poznań Society for the Advancement of Arts and Sciences, International Association for the Philosophy of Law and Social Philosophy (IVR) and served as a vice president of the International Association of Legal Methodology.

In 1991, Ziembiński became a corresponding member of the Polish Academy of Sciences.

=== Honours and awards ===
- : Home Army Cross (1975)
- : Commander's Cross of the Order of Polonia Restituta (1994)
- : The City of Poznań Excellence in Science Award for his series of publications on basic issues of law and ethics (1996)
