= Magdalena Ogórek =

Polish TV presenter and politician

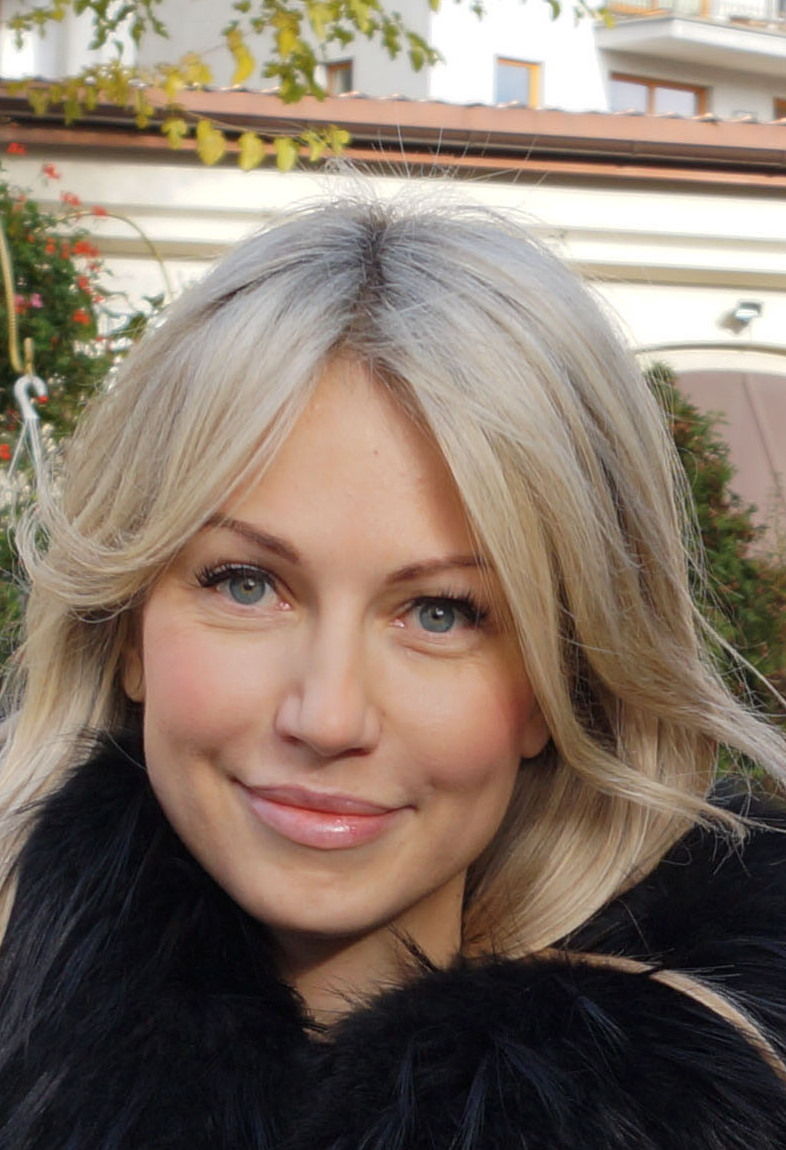
- Ogórek in 2015

Personal details
- Born: Magdalena Agnieszka Ogórek; 23 February 1979 (age 47) Rybnik, Poland
- Party: Democratic Left Alliance (2008–2015)
- Spouse: Piotr Mochnaczewski
- Education: University of Opole (PhD)

Magdalena Agnieszka Ogórek (Polish: [magda'lɛna ɔ'gurɛk]; born 23 February 1979) is a Polish TV presenter and politician. In 2015 she was a presidential candidate of Democratic Left Alliance.

== Early life and education ==
Ogórek was born in Rybnik, Poland. In 2002, she completed a master's degree in history at the University of Opole, and in 2003 completed postgraduate studies in European integration at the University of Warsaw, and thematic studies in 2005 at the European Institute of Public Administration in Maastricht. In 2009, at the University of Opole, Ogórek received her PhD. She has lectured at the School of Customs and Logistics in Warsaw under the auspices of Malopolska College in Kraków.

== Professional and political activity ==
Ogórek had internships and apprenticeships in the Office for European Integration in the Office of the President of Poland and the Prime Minister's Office. In 2004, she was employed as a clerk in the Ministry of Internal Affairs and Administration, where she worked for two years. For three years she was an associate of the President of the Democratic Left Alliance Grzegorz Napieralski, and in 2010 was a member of the presidential election staff.

In the parliamentary elections in 2011, she unsuccessfully stood as a parliamentary candidate of the Democratic Left Alliance. On 9 January 2015, Ogórek announced that she was standing in the 2015 presidential election as the candidate of the Democratic Left Alliance.

She criticised Russian actions in Ukraine, but argued Poland cannot afford to be seen by Russian media as an enemy.

She highlighted the Jewish ancestry of a senator, Marek Borowski, when criticizing his politics on TVP which sparked a wave of critical comments. The head of TVP demanded an explanation from Ogórek.

From 2015, she has been actively involved in recovery of precious Polish art work and artifacts stolen in large quantities by German and Austrian Nazis during World War II. One of her successes was the recovery in February 2017 of the painting of Potocki Palace by 19th-century Polish countess Julia Potocka, the 18th century map of Polish-Lithuanian Commonwealth and the engraving presenting view on Kraków. The recovery of these became possible due to 2-year long negotiations with Horst von Wächter, a son of Austrian Nazi governor Otto von Wächter, who stole those paintings from occupied Kraków during World War II.

== Media career ==
Ogórek has had cameo roles in television and film productions, including Los Chlopakos (2003), Czego się boją faceci, czyli seks w mniejszym mieście (2003) and Lokatorzy (2002). Since 2002, she played a nurse in several episodes on Na dobre i na złe. In 2014, she hosted the international newscast World Atlas on TVN24 BiS.

In 2019 during a talk show her statements were judged to be defamatory, but her conviction was overturned by presidential pardon in 2023.
