= Sławomira Wronkowska-Jaśkiewicz =

Polish legal scholar (born 1943)

Her Magnificence Sławomira Wronkowska-Jaśkiewicz
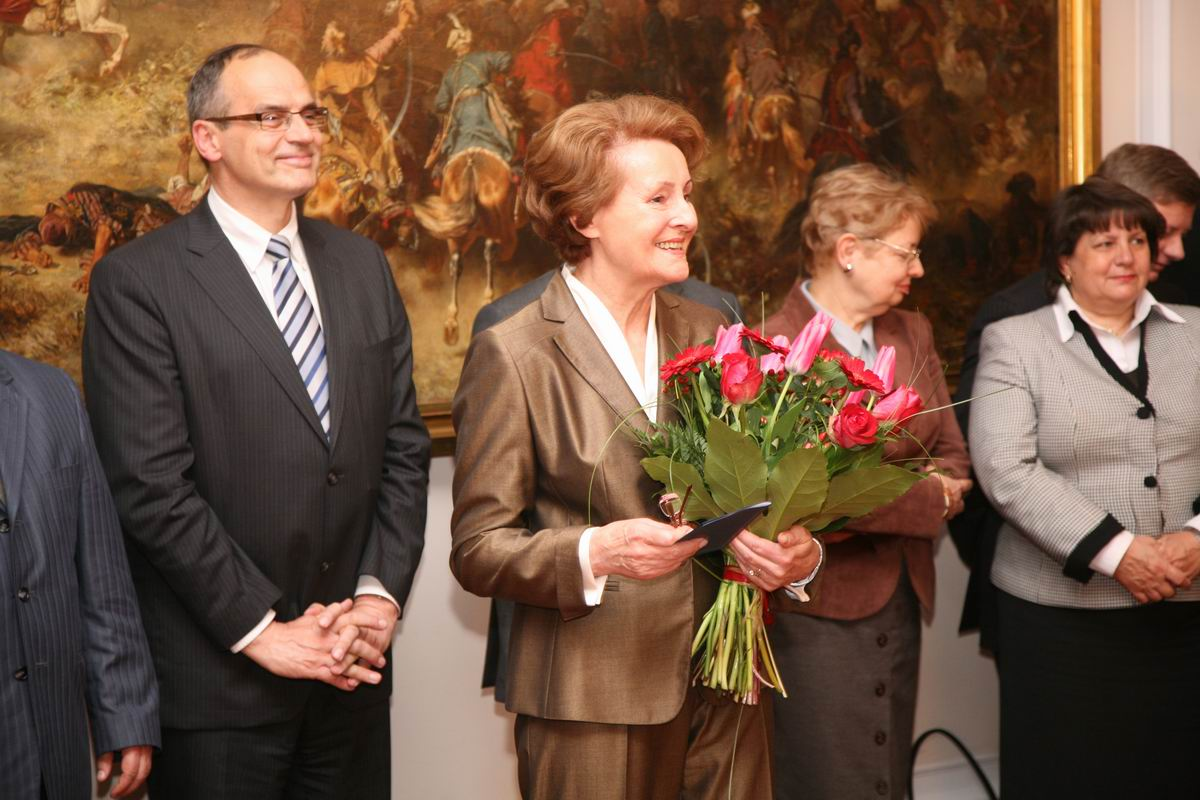
- Sławomira Wronkowska-Jaśkiewicz at the Presidential Palace, Warsaw in 2010

Judge of the Constitutional Tribunal of the Republic of Poland
- In office 6 May 2010 – 6 May 2019
- Nominated by: Bronisław Komorowski

Deputy Rector of the Adam Mickiewicz University in Poznań
- In office 1 October 2005 – 1 October 2008
- Nominated by: Academic Senate

Personal details
- Born: 14 February 1943 (age 83) Poznań, Poland
- Education: Adam Mickiewicz University PhD (1971), Habilitation (1982)
- Awards: Order of Polonia Restituta Medal of the Commission of National Education Decoration of Honor Meritorious for Polish Legislation

Sławomira Kazimiera Wronkowska-Jaśkiewicz, PR (born 14 February 1943) is a Polish legal scholar, Professor emeritus of Jurisprudence at the Adam Mickiewicz University in Poznań. She has a particular interest in legal theory, legislation, legal interpretation, legal reasoning and philosophy of law. She belongs to the Poznań school of legal theory.

Wronkowska-Jaśkiewicz is a retired Judge of the Constitutional Tribunal of Poland who served from her appointment in 2010 until the end of her cadence in 2019. She was the eleventh woman to serve on the Court.

== Career ==
Wronkowska-Jaśkiewicz was born and raised in the City of Poznań. After attending Adam Mickiewicz University in Poznań (AMU), where she received a Doctor of Philosophy degree in 1971, studying under Zygmunt Ziembiński and Doctor of Sciences degree in 1982, she began her career as a Professor of Legal Theory and Philosophy at the AMU Faculty of Law and Administration, where she became a professor ordinarius (1995), chaired the AMU Department of Legal Theory and Legal Philosophy (1991−2013) and was later named AMU Deputy Rector (2005−2008).

In 1980 and 1983, Wronkowska-Jaśkiewicz received the Alexander von Humboldt Foundation Scholarship. She was also a visiting professor at Viadrina European University in Frankfurt (Oder) and University of Warsaw and president of the Polish Academy of Sciences' Legal Studies Committee (2008−2011).

In May 2010 with the recommendation of Civic Platform she was elected by 415 members of Sejm as a Judge of Constitutional Tribunal of the Republic of Poland and took the oath of office on 6 May 2010. She ended her term in 2019.

She received the Knight's Cross of the Order of Polonia Restituta and the Medal of the Commission of National Education.

== See also ==
- Polish constitutional crisis, 2015
