= Cabinet of Donald Tusk =

Cabinet of Donald Tusk may refer to:

- First Cabinet of Donald Tusk, from 16 November 2007 to 18 November 2011
- Second Cabinet of Donald Tusk, from 18 November 2011 to 22 September 2014
- Third Cabinet of Donald Tusk, from 13 December 2023
