= Adam Jarubas =

Polish politician (born 1974)

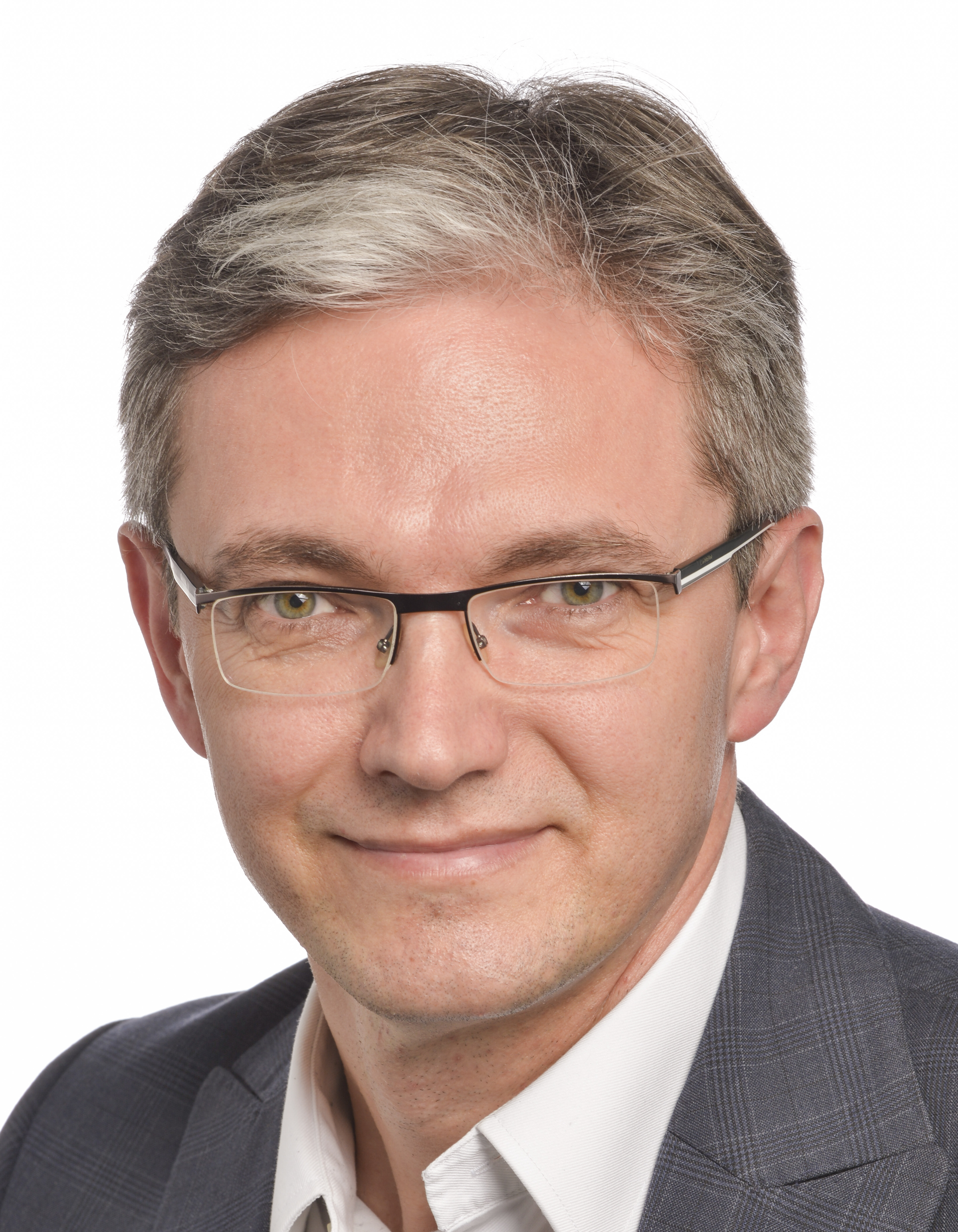

Marshal of Świętokrzyskie Voivodeship
- In office 27 November 2006 – 22 November 2018
- Preceded by: Franciszek Wołodźko

Personal details
- Born: 17 December 1974 (age 51) Busko-Zdrój, Poland
- Party: Polish People's Party
- Education: Jan Kochanowski University

Adam Sebastian Jarubas (born 17 December 1974 in Busko-Zdrój) is a Polish politician and former Marshal of Świętokrzyskie Voivodeship (2006-2018). He became vice-president of Polish People's Party in December 2012. He was the official candidate of the party for the office of President of Poland in the 2015 Polish presidential elections. In the first round he received 1,60% of votes, which gave him the sixth place among the candidates.
