= 2015 Polish presidential election =

- 10 May 2015 (first round); 24 May 2015 (second round)
- Turnout: 48.96% (first round) ▼5.96pp 55.34% (second round) ▲0.04pp
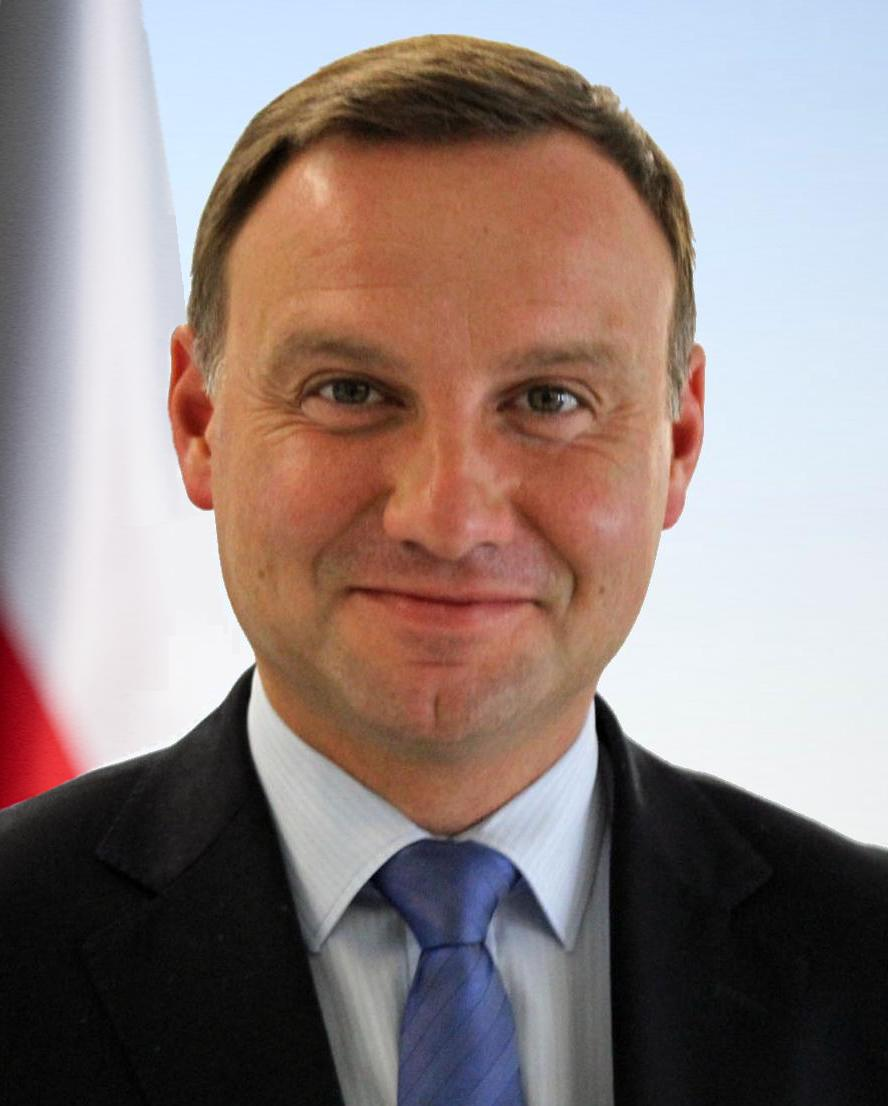

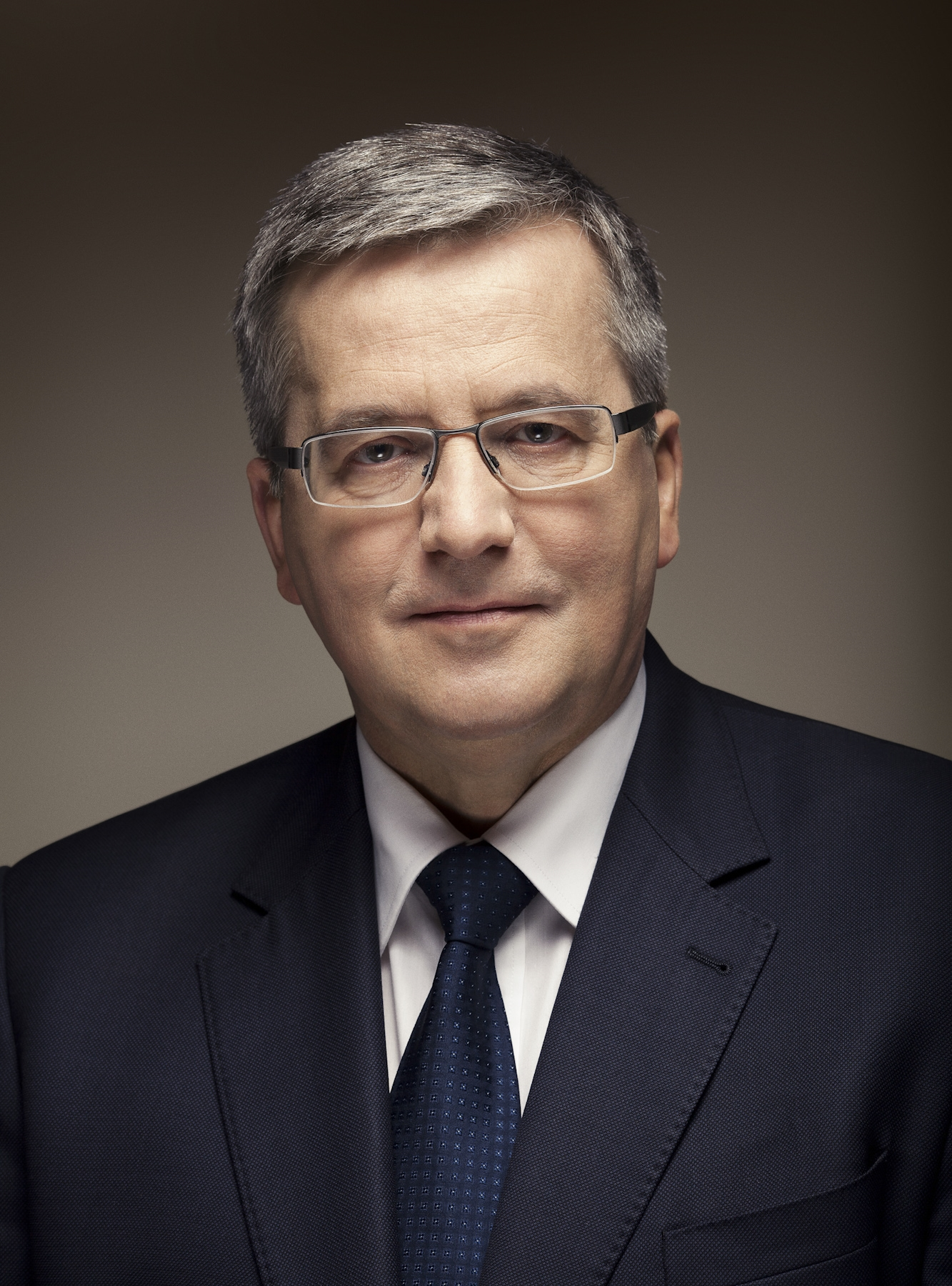
Nominee	Andrzej Duda	Bronisław Komorowski
Party	PiS	Independent (Note: The President of Poland traditionally resigns from party membership after taking office. Although Komorowski was officially an independent, his campaign was endorsed and funded by the Civic Platform.)
Popular vote	8,630,627	8,112,311
Percentage	51.55%	48.45%
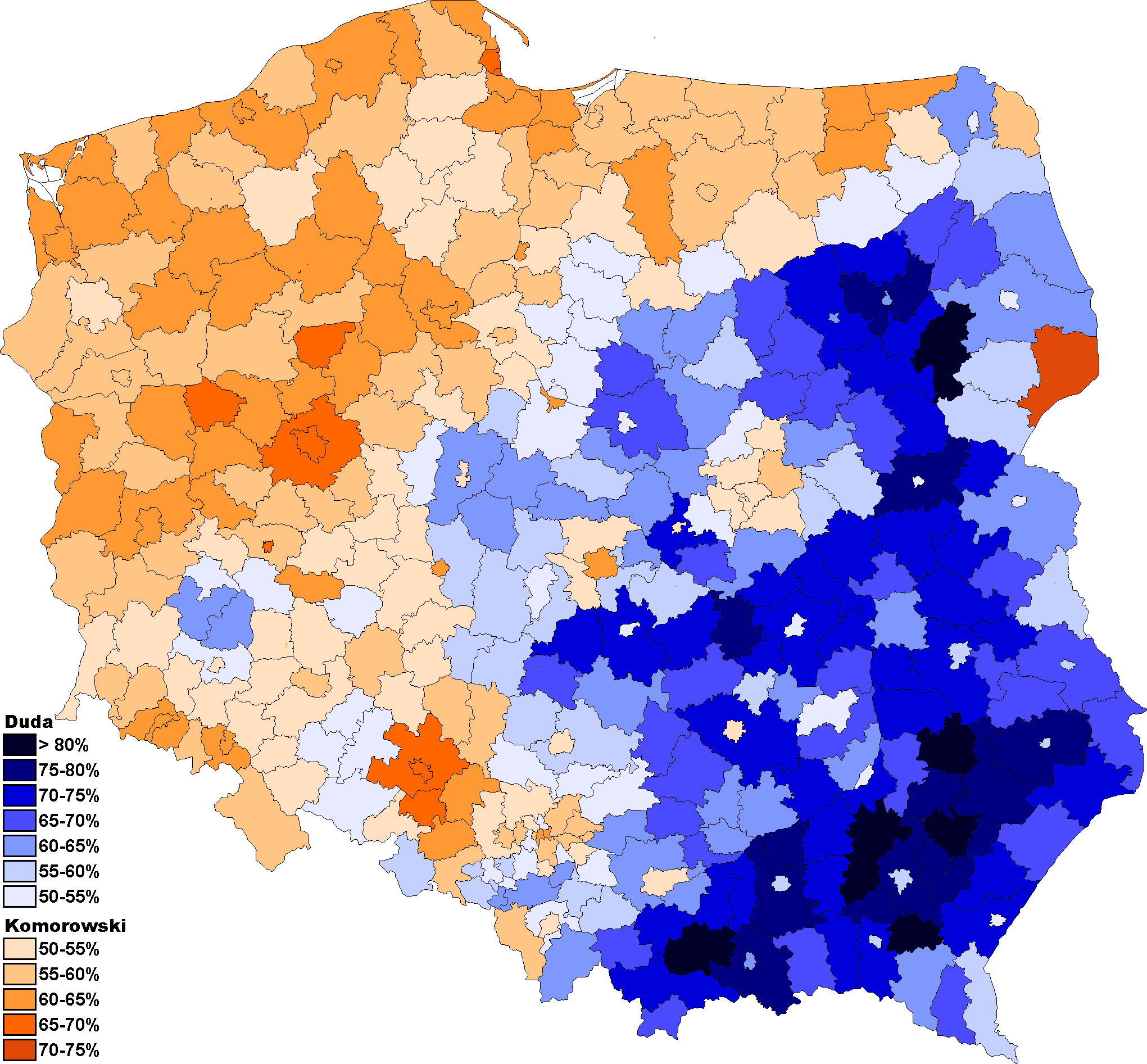
- Results of the second round
President before election
Bronisław Komorowski
Independent
Elected President
Andrzej Duda
PiS

Presidential elections were held in Poland on 10 and 24 May 2015. In the first round of voting Law and Justice (PiS) candidate, lawyer and Member of the European Parliament, Andrzej Duda received the highest number of votes with a share of 34.76%, followed by the incumbent president Bronisław Komorowski (with 33.77%), who ran as an independent with the endorsement of the Civic Platform (PO), whose membership he had renounced after winning the 2010 elections. Independent candidate Paweł Kukiz came in third with 20.80% of the votes. As no candidate had received more than 50% of the votes cast, a second round was held on 24 May between the two highest-placed candidates, Duda and Komorowski. This round was won by Duda with 51.5% of the votes, to Komorowski's 48.5%.

== Electoral system ==
The president was elected directly by the people to serve for five years, and can be re-elected only once. Pursuant to the provisions of the Constitution, the president had to be elected by an absolute majority of valid votes; if no candidate succeeds in passing this threshold, a second round of voting is held with the two candidates who received the largest and second largest number of votes respectively.

In order to be registered to contest the elections, candidates had to be a Polish citizen, at least 35 years old on the day of the first round of the election, and have collected at least 100,000 voters' signatures.

According to the article 28, the day of the election had to fall on a Sunday between 100 and 75 days before the end of the term of the incumbent. As the term of Bronisław Komorowski would officially end on 6 August 2015, the first round had to occur between 27 April and 22 May, so that the possible dates were theoretically either 3, 10, or 17 May, though in practice only the latter two were realistic possibilities as the first fell on Constitution Day, a national holiday.

This was the first presidential election carried out following changes in 2011.

== Candidates ==
In total 23 candidates registered with the State Electoral Commission. Only 11 submitted the required 100,000 signatures supporting their candidacy before the 26 March deadline.:

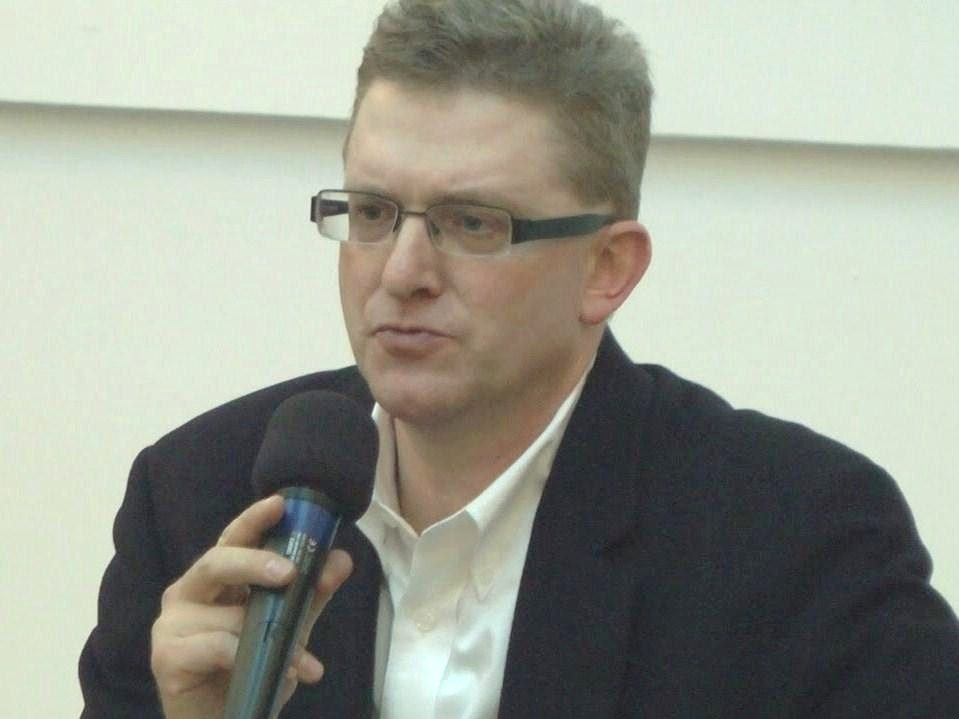
Film director Grzegorz Braun (Independent), age 48

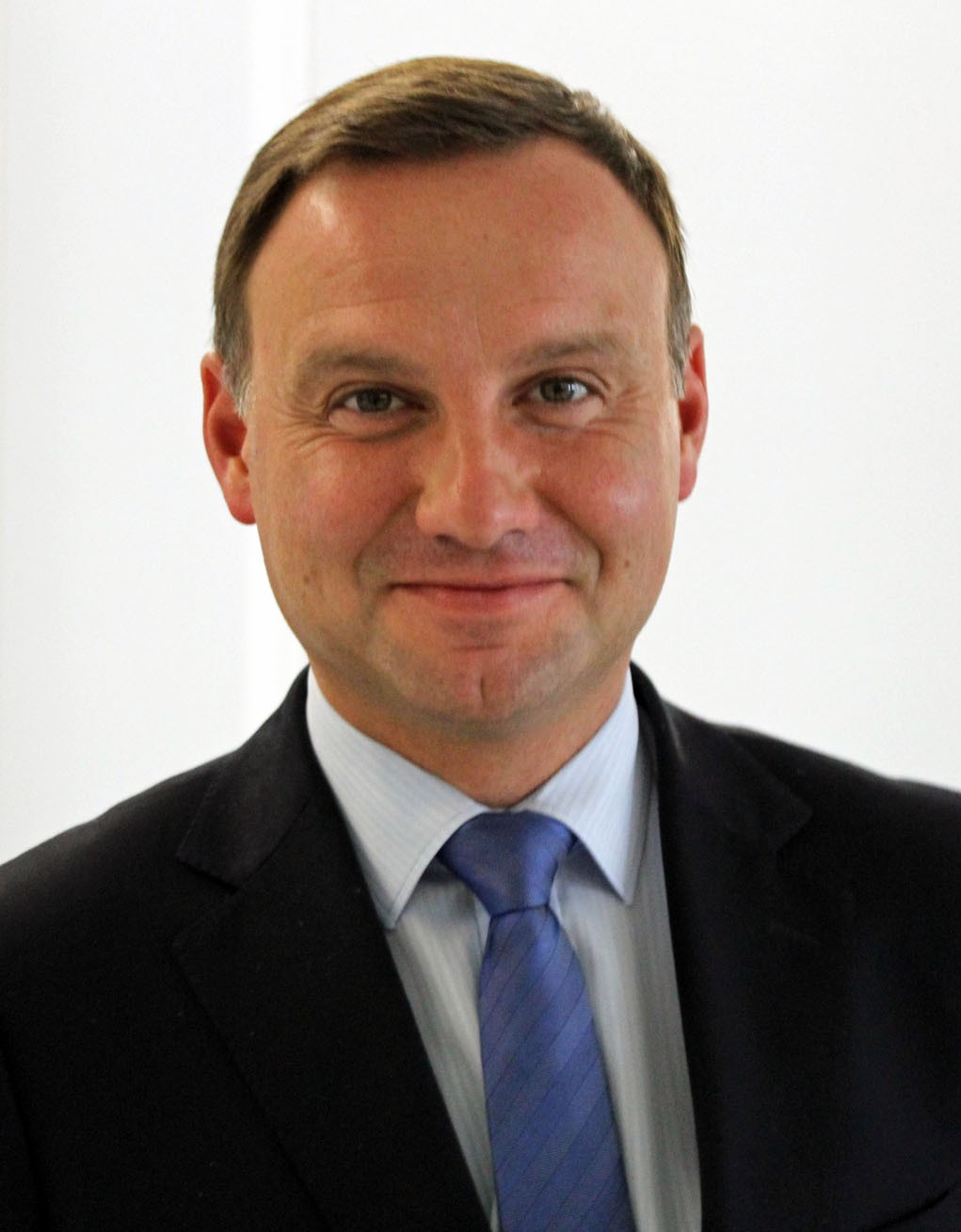
Member of European Parliament Andrzej Duda (Law and Justice), age 42

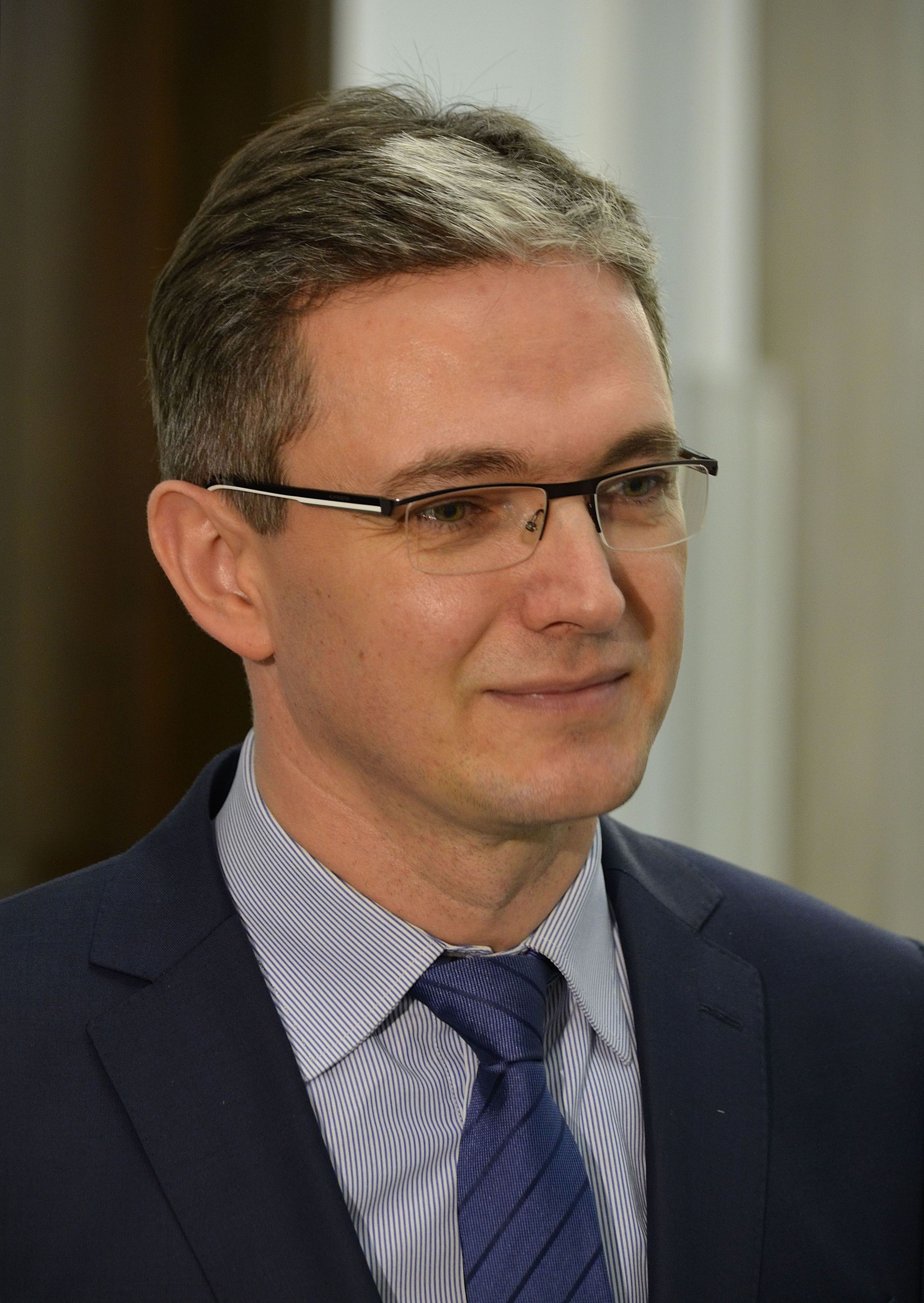
Marszałek of Świętokrzyskie Voivodeship Adam Jarubas (Polish People's Party), age 40

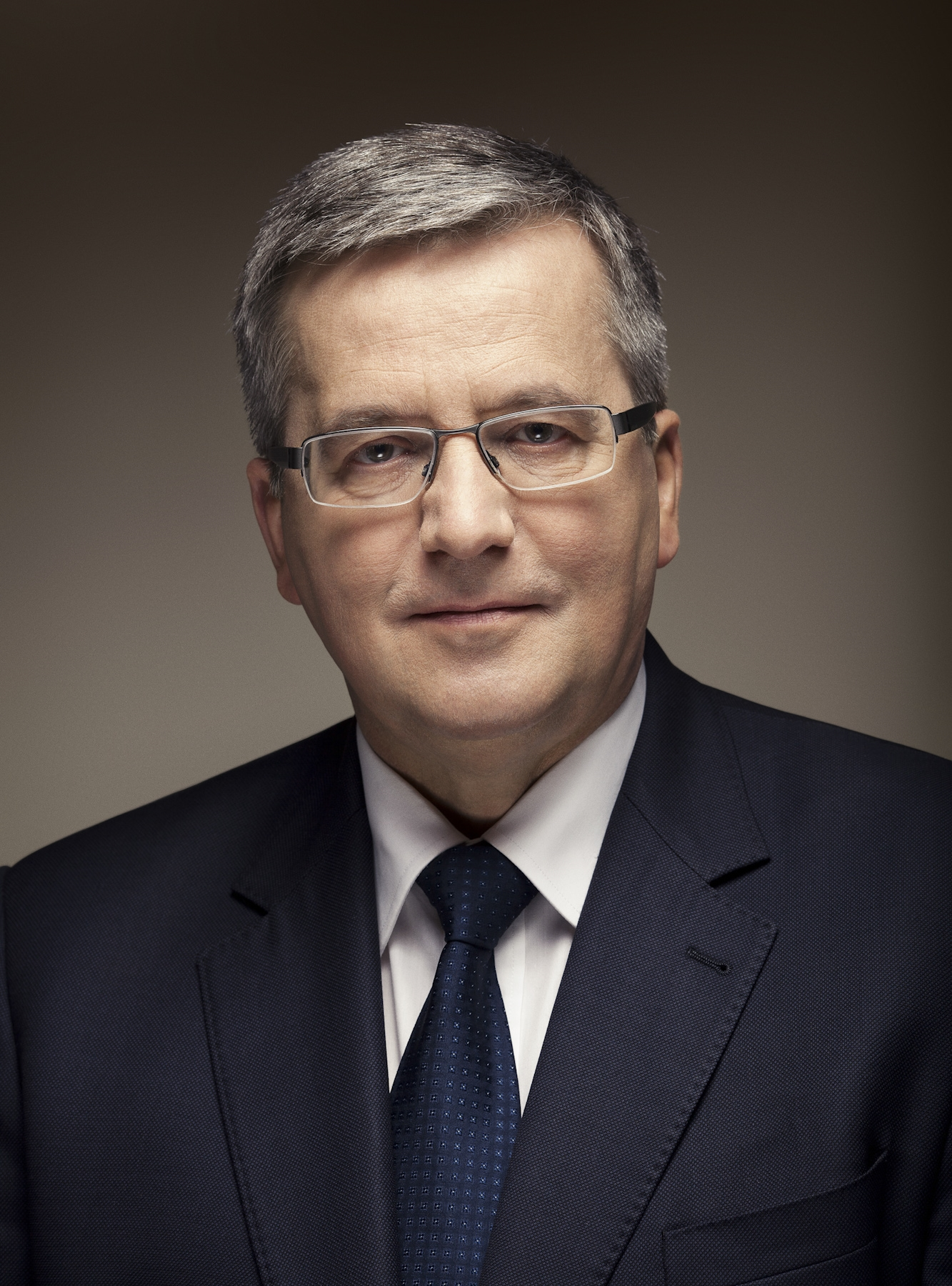
Incumbent President of Poland Bronisław Komorowski (Independent with Civic Platform endorsement), age 62

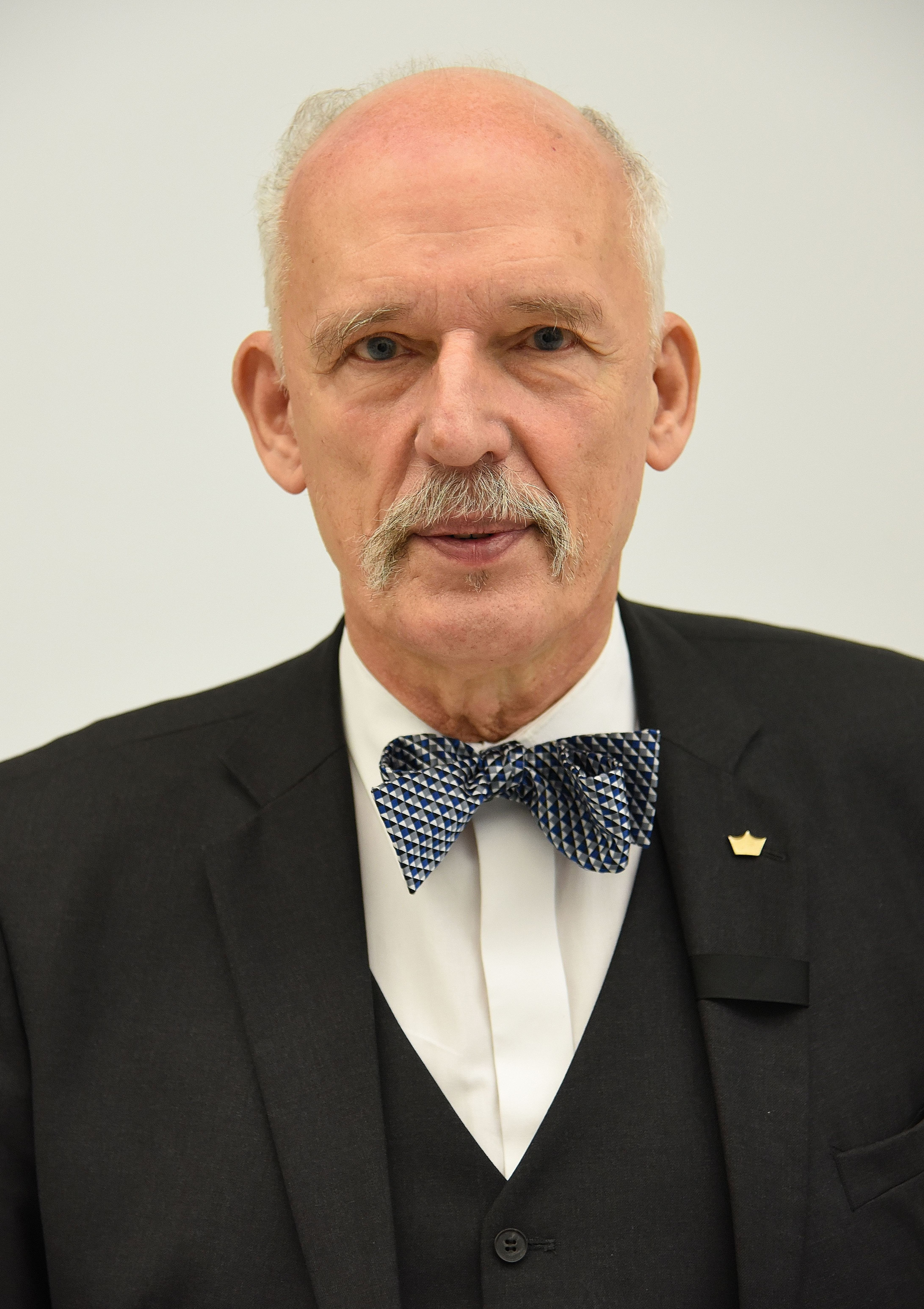
Member of European Parliament Janusz Korwin-Mikke (KORWiN), age 72

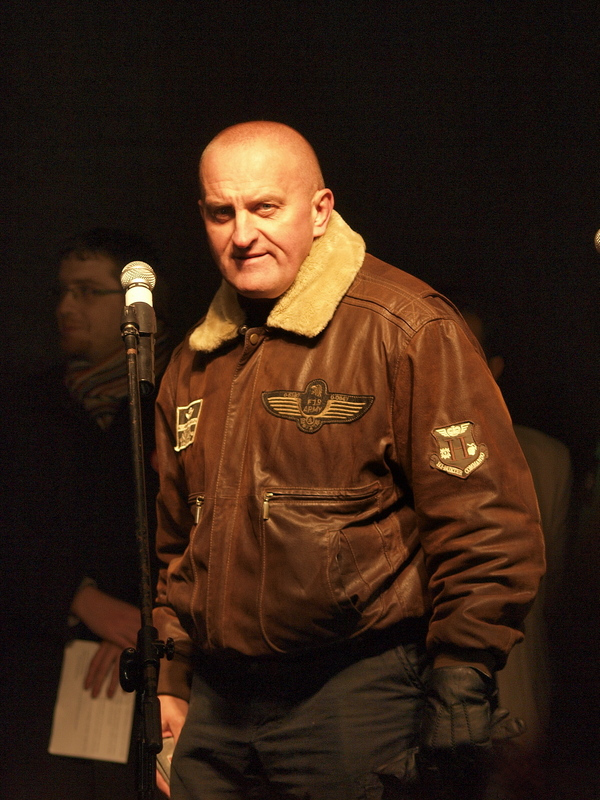
Columnist Marian Kowalski (National Movement), age 50

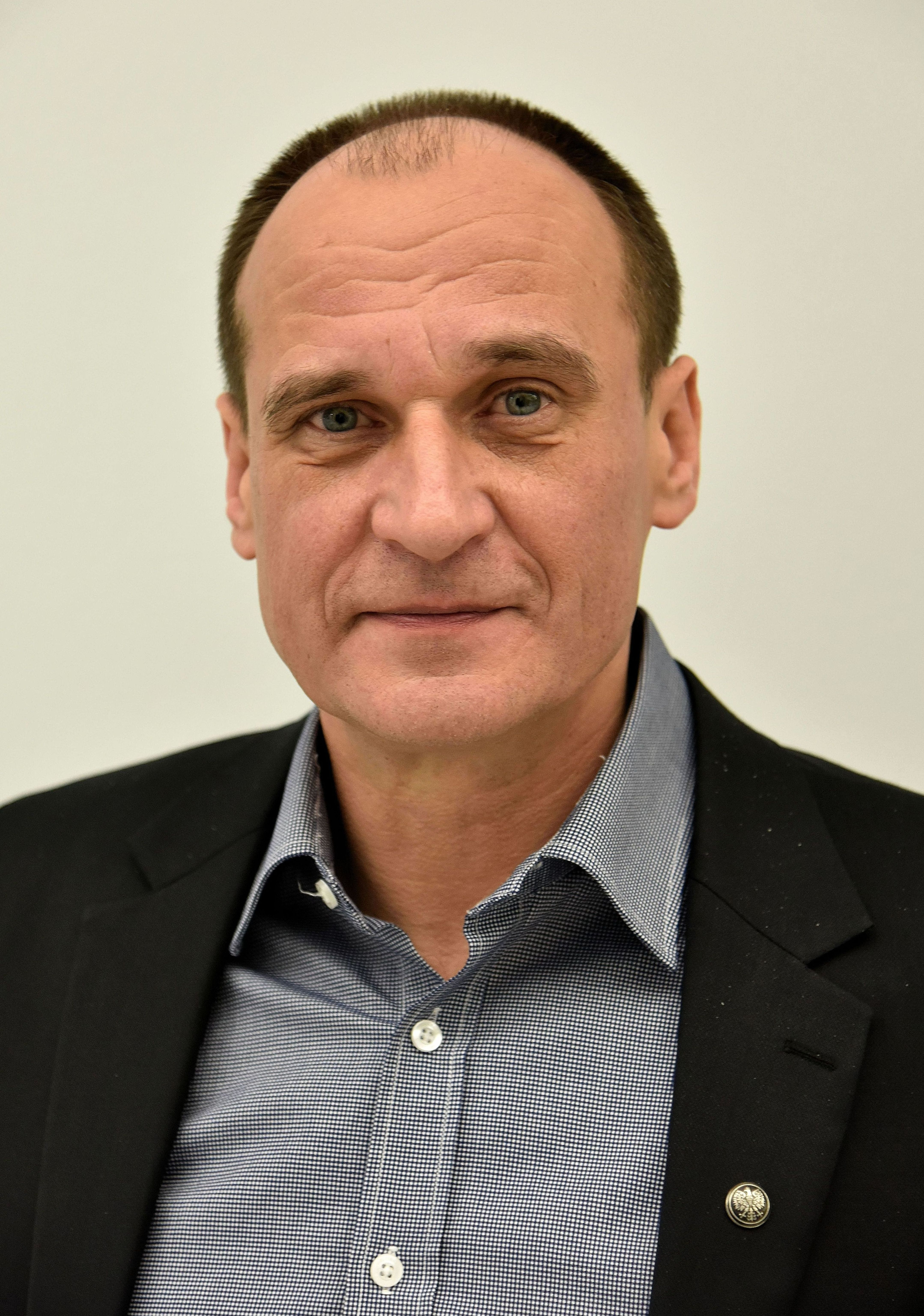
Member of the Lower Silesian Regional Assembly Paweł Kukiz (Independent), age 51

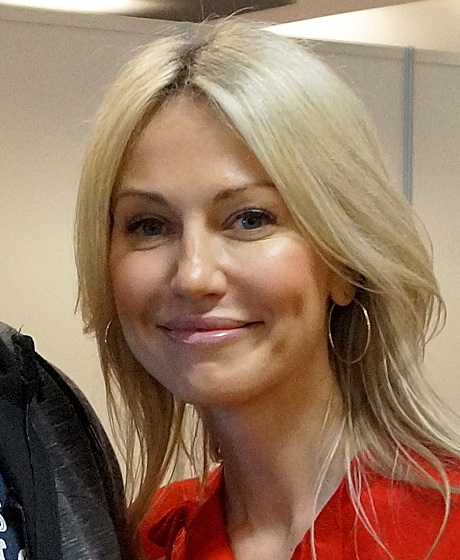
Historian Magdalena Ogórek (Independent with Democratic Left Alliance endorsement), age 36

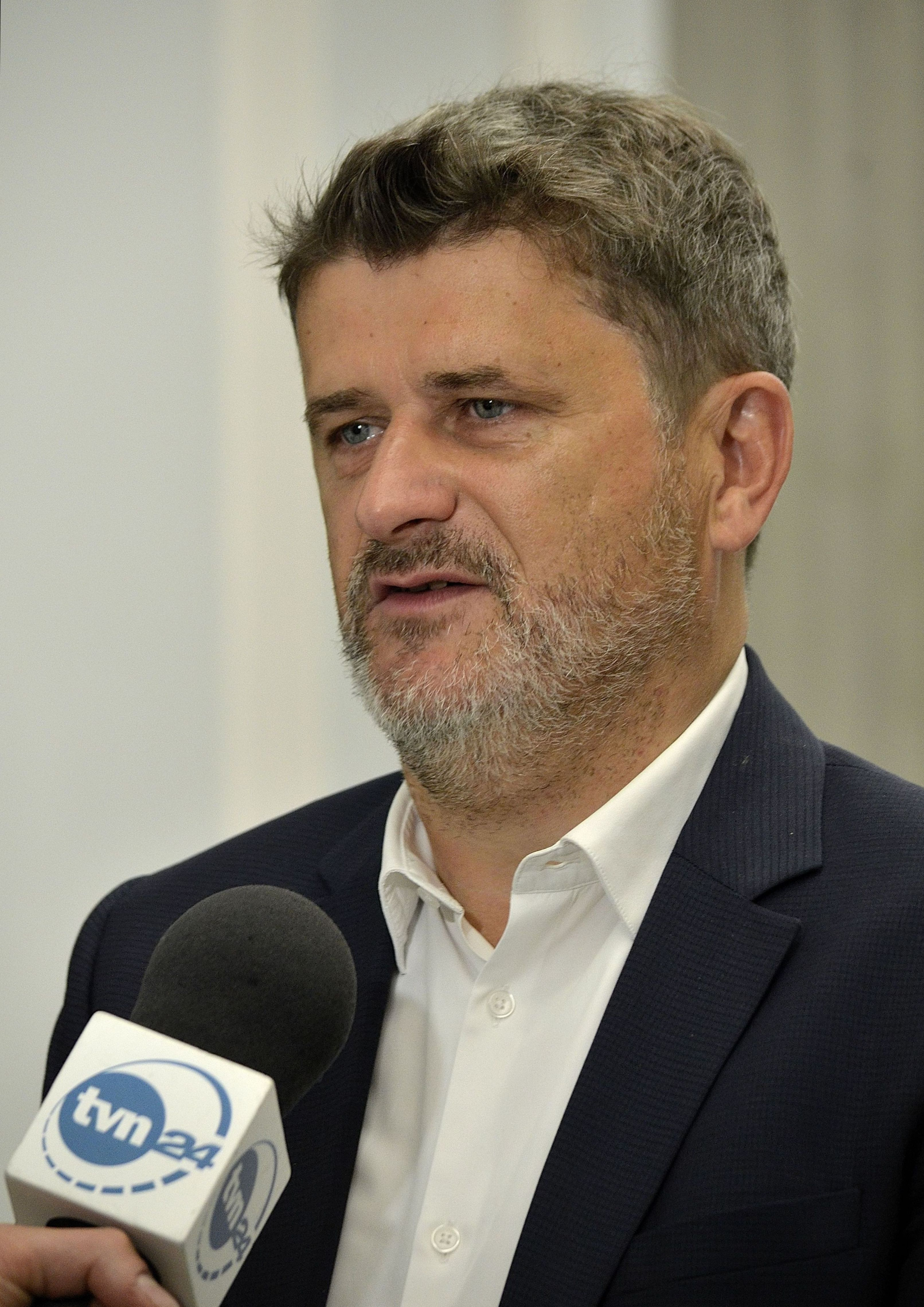
Member of Sejm Janusz Palikot (Your Movement), age 50

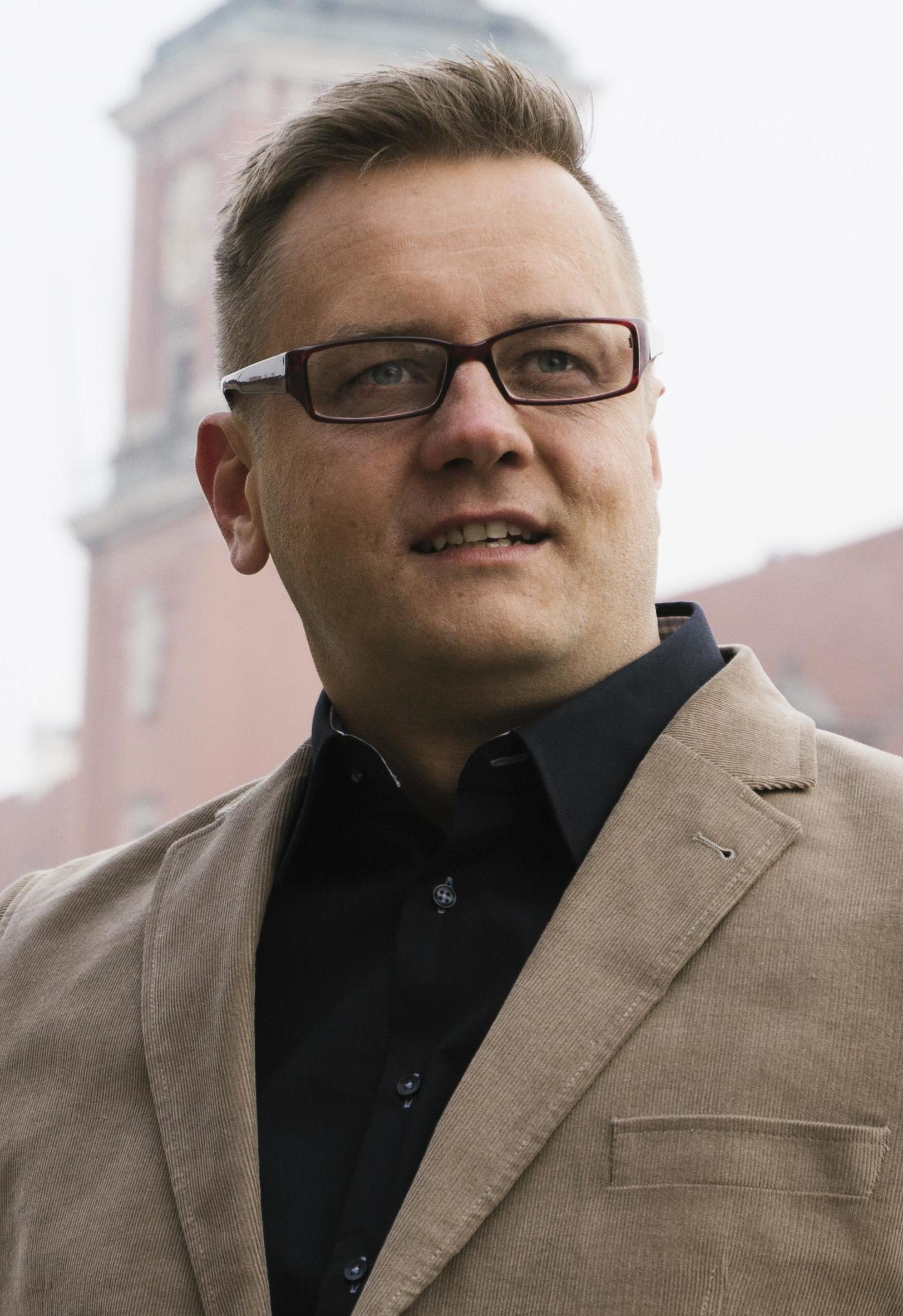
Entrepreneur Paweł Tanajno (Direct Democracy), age 39

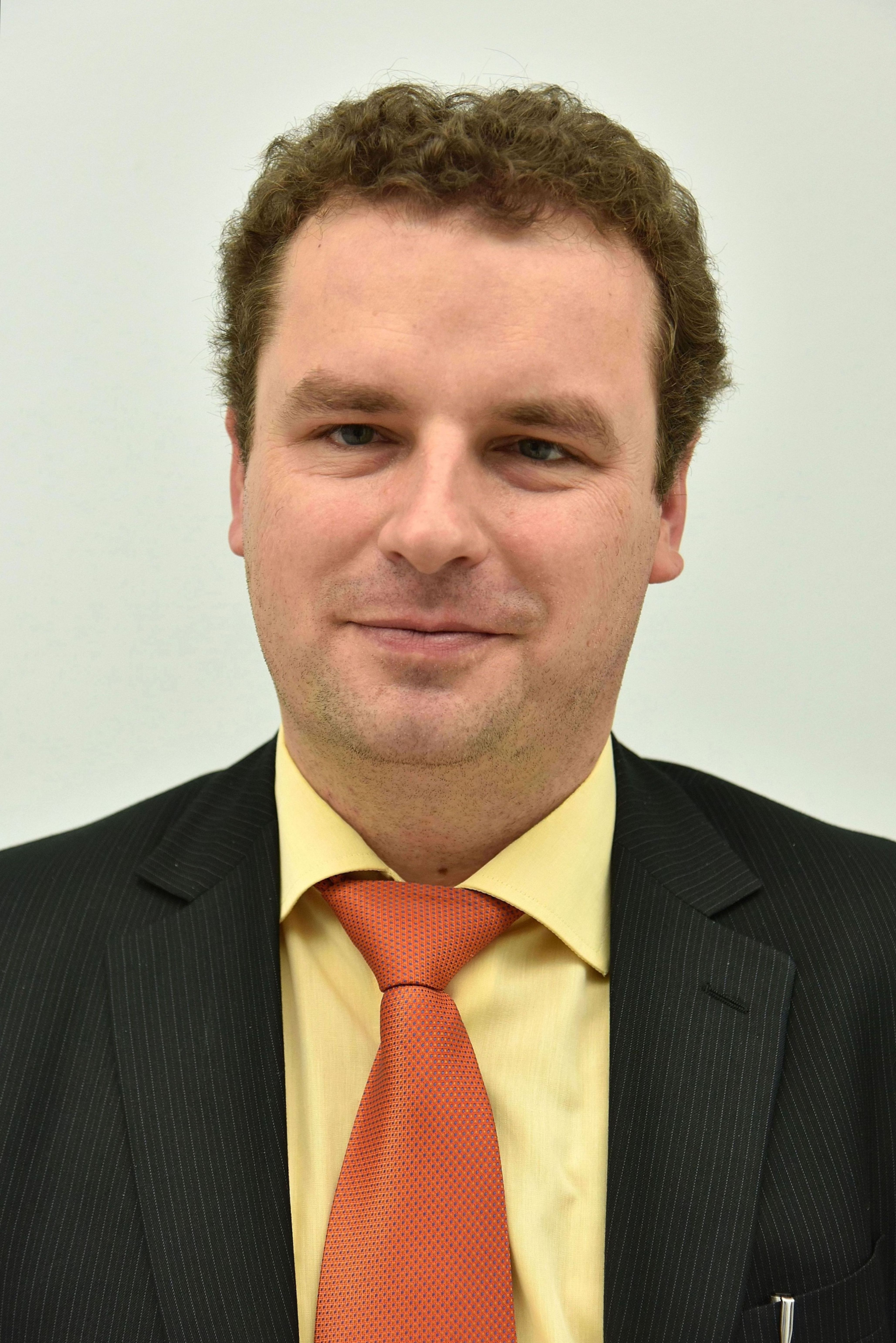
Barrister Jacek Wilk (Congress of the New Right), age 40

=== Rejected candidates ===
The registered candidates who failed to submit 100,000 signatures supporting their run for office were:

- Artur Głowacki, an entrepreneur
- Anna Grodzka, the first transgender member of the Polish parliament, The Greens party candidate
- Zdzisław Jankowski, deputy leader of Patriotic Poland party, former member of Sejm
- Włodzimierz Julian Korab-Karpowicz, leader of Przyszła Polska, philosopher and political thinker, former Deputy Mayor of Gdańsk
- Dariusz Łaska, a candidate representing a minor NGO Patriotic Community of Solidary Deliberation.
- Stanisław Majdański, former senator, candidate of agrarian conservative Ojcowizna party.
- Balli Marzec, ethnic Kazakh activist and publicist, candidate of NGO Kazakh Community.
- Kornel Morawiecki, democratic activist in time of PRL, founder and leader of Fighting Solidarity, candidate in 2010 election.
- Zenon Nowak, candidate of party Brave Dad protecting rights of fathers.
- Wanda Nowicka, current Deputy Marshall of the Sejm, the candidate of the social-democratic party Labour Union.
- Iwona Piątek, leader of Women's Party
- Adam Słomka, a former member of Sejm and an anti-communist activist

Among those who publicly announced their candidacy, but failed to register, were:

- Waldemar Deska, a musician, former member of reggae band Daab, the candidate of the Libertarian Party, eventually withdrew his candidacy and expressed his support for Janusz Korwin-Mikke.
- Włodzimierz Zydorczak, businessman and candidate of association Obywatelska RP. had his application rejected by the State Electoral Commission

== Campaign ==
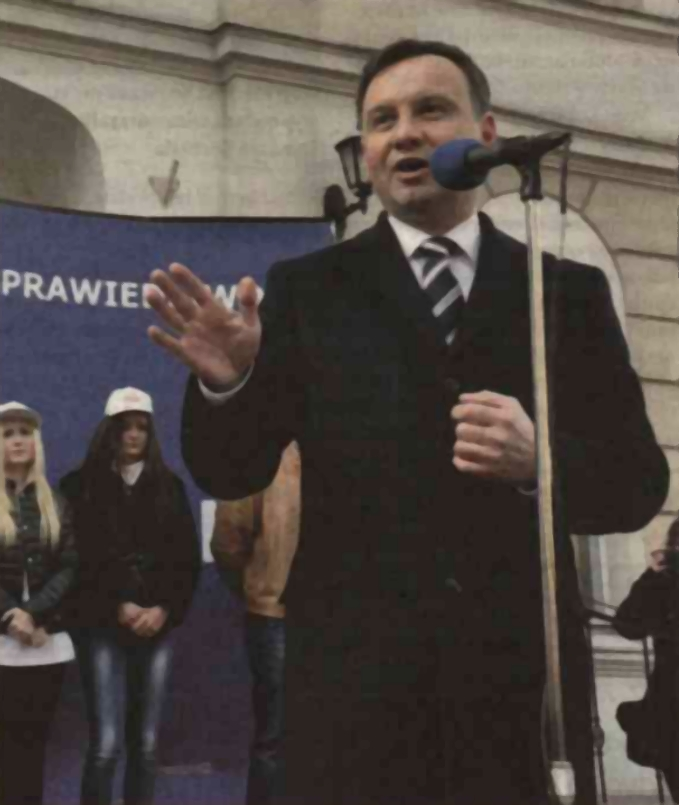
Andrzej Duda during his campaign in Prudnik

=== Television debates ===
One debate took place before the first round, on 5 May, chaired by Krzysztof Ziemiec and aired on TVP 1. Ten candidates attended the debate, while President Komorowski declined to appear.

Two debates took place before the second round, the first chaired by Dorota Gawryluk and by Krzysztof Ziemiec on 17 May, and the second on 21 May by TVN, chaired by Monika Olejnik, Bogdan Rymanowski and Justyna Pochanke. In both of these, the candidates also had the opportunity to pose questions to the other. Komorowski was generally regarded by the Polish press and political analysts to have won the first of the second-round debates. The second debate was considered to be less decisive.

=== Second round candidate endorsements ===
Candidate	First round	Endorsement
Paweł Kukiz	20.80%	No endorsement
Adam Jarubas	1.60%	Bronisław Komorowski
Grzegorz Braun	0.83%	Andrzej Duda

== Opinion polls ==
=== Graphical summary ===
Graphical summary of the first round opinion polls: Andrzej Duda B. Komorowski Paweł Kukiz J. Korwin-Mikke Magdalena Ogórek Adam Jarubas Janusz Palikot Grzegorz Braun Marian Kowalski Jacek Wilk

Nearly all opinion polls taken before the first round of the election predicted President Komorowski would receive the largest vote share in the first round, with some polls taken in late 2014 and early 2015 suggesting he was on track for an outright win that would avoid a runoff election.

Polls were closer in the second round, with most predicting a narrow Duda victory. At least one late poll showed Komorowski pulling ahead, but just slightly.

=== First round ===
Poll source	Date(s) administered	Undecided													Others	Lead
Poll source	Date(s) administered	Undecided	Komorowski PO	Duda PiS	Ogórek IN	Jarubas PSL	Palikot TR	Korwin-Mikke KORWiN	Braun IN	Grodzka Greens	Kowalski RN	Kukiz IN	Wilk KNP	Nowicka UP	Others	Lead
EXIT POLLS: IPSOS	10 May 2015	-	32.2%	34.8%	2.4%	1.6%	1.5%	4.4%	1.1%	-	0.8%	20.3%	0.6%	-	0.3%	2.6%
Election day (10 May)
IBRiS	8 May 2015	7.5%	39%	31%	3%	2%	1%	3%	1%	-	1%	19%	0%	-	0%	8%
TNS Poland	6–7 May 2015	13%	35%	27%	3%	2%	1%	3%	1%	-	0%	15%	0%	-	0%	8%
Millward Brown	7 May 2015	3%	39%	27%	4%	2%	3%	5%	1%	-	0%	13%	0%	-	0%	12%
IBRiS	6 May 2015	5%	39.7%	29%	2.4%	3.2%	1.7%	4.2%	0.8%	-	0.7%	14.3%	0%	-	0.1%	10.7%
Pressmix	3 May 2015	5.1%	33.3%	33.3%	3.3%	1.8%	0.9%	6.6%	0.8%	-	0.6%	13.7%	0.5%	-	0.1%	Tie
Millward Brown	13 April 2015	7%	45%	28%	4%	2%	2%	6%	-	-	-	6%	-	-	-	17%
TNS Poland	7–8 April 2015	13%	46%	24%	3%	1%	2%	4%	-	-	-	6%	-	-	-	22%
Millward Brown	30 March 2015	9%	42%	26%	7%	2%	3%	6%	-	-	1%	4%	-	-	-	16%
IBRiS	27–28 March 2015	11.1%	40.7%	26.6%	4.9%	5.1%	2.7%	4.8%	0.4%	-	0.4%	3.3%	0%	-	-	14.1%
100,000 supporting signatures deadline (26 March)
TNS Poland	13–18 March 2015	21%	41%	24%	6%	2%	1%	2%	-	-	-	2%	-	1%	-	17%
Millward Brown	16 March 2015	2%	46%	31%	4%	1%	4%	4%	-	0%	1%	5%	-	1%	1%	15%
PPW	9–15 March 2015	-	48%	30%	4%	2%	6%	4%	-	1%	1%	2%	1%	0%	1%	18%
IBRiS	13 March 2015	12%	46%	26%	5%	4%	3%	3%	-	-	-	1%	-	-	-	20%
TNS Poland	10–11 March 2015	12%	45%	27%	5%	1%	1%	4%	<1%	1%	<1%	2%	<1%	1%	1%	18%
CBOS	5–11 March 2015	18%	52%	19%	3%	1%	2%	1%	-	<0.5%	<0.5%	2%	-	<0.5%	2%	33%
PPW	2–8 March 2015	-	48%	28%	3%	2%	7%	4%	-	1%	1%	4%	-	1%	1%	20%
Millward Brown	2 March 2015	2%	46%	27%	8%	3%	2%	4%	-	1%	1%	4%	-	0%	2%	19%
PPW	23–28 Feb 2015	-	50%	28%	4%	3%	5%	3%	-	1%	1%	3%	-	1%	1%	22%
Ipsos	25–26 Feb 2015	3.2%	49.7%	28%	5.7%	2%	1.4%	3.8%	-	-	0.7%	3.5%	0.3%	-	0.5%	21.7%
PPW	16–22 Feb 2015	-	51%	25%	4%	3%	6%	2%	-	1%	1%	5%	-	1%	1%	26%
TNS Poland	13–18 Feb 2015	22%	47%	17%	6%	4%	1%	1%	-	1%	-	1%	-	-	-	30%
Estymator	15–17 Feb 2015	-	51%	25%	8%	4%	2%	3%	0%	1%	0%	5%	0%	-	-	26%
Millward Brown	16 Feb 2015	5%	47%	24%	7%	2%	6%	3%	–	1%	0%	4%	-	-	-	23%
GfK Polonia	12–16 Feb 2015	14%	52%	20%	4%	2%	2%	2%	–	-	-	3%	-	-	-	32%
IBRiS	12–13 Feb 2015	9%	49%	26%	5%	2%	2%	2%	–	1%	<1%	3%	<1%	-	-	23%
CBOS	5–11 Feb 2015	8%	63%	15%	3%	2%	1%	3%	–	1%	-	-	-	-	4%	48%
TNS Poland	4–5 Feb 2015	11%	53%	19%	5%	2%	2%	2%	–	1%	1%	-	-	-	4%^{e}	34%
IBRiS	3 Feb 2015	-	55%	25%	5%	1%	2%	4%	–	-	-	-	-	-	-	30%
Millward Brown	25 Jan 2015	4%	62%	18%	8%	1%^{a}	2%	3%	–	-	1%	-	-	-	-	44%
TNS Poland	16–21 Jan 2015	24%	52%	12%	5%	-	2%	3%	–	-	0%	-	-	-	-	40%
Ariadna	16–20 Jan 2015	-	48%	17%	7%	2%	7%	7%	–	-	2%	-	-	-	10%^{d}	31%
GfK Polonia	15–18 Jan 2015	20%	55%	14%	4%	-	2%	3%	–	-	-	-	-	-	-	41%
TNS Poland	12–13 Jan 2015	11%	56%	19%	6%	1%	2%	4%	–	-	-	-	-	-	1%	37%
Millward Brown	12 Jan 2015	4%	65%	21%	6%	-	1%	3%	–	-	-	-	-	-	-	44%
TNS Poland	10–11 Dec 2014	13%	56%	17%	-	-	2%	5%	–	-	-	-	-	-	7%^{b}	39%
IBRiS	4 Dec 2014	5%	55.6%	23.1%	-	-	1.3%	4.8%	0.7%	-	-	-	-	-	11.5%^{c}	32.5%

Notes

- ^a PSL's candidate's name had not been announced at the time, however the poll asked about support for any potential party's candidate.
- ^b Including Ryszard Kalisz at 4%
- ^c Including Wojciech Olejniczak at 6.4%, Jarosław Kalinowski at 1.7%, Zbigniew Stonoga at 1%, and Mirosław Piotrowski at 0.4%
- ^d Including Ryszard Kalisz at 10%
- ^e Including Ryszard Kalisz at 3%

=== Second round ===
Poll source	Date(s) administered	Abstention			Undecided
Poll source	Date(s) administered	Abstention	Komorowski PO	Duda PiS	Undecided
Millward Brown	20 May 2015	-	47%	45%	8%
Estymator	18 May 2015	-	48%	52%	-
Millward Brown	18 May 2015	-	47%	44%	9%
IBRiS	14 May 2015	-	43.2%	48%	6.9%
Millward Brown	14 May 2015	-	40%	44%	15%
Estymator	13–14 May 2015	-	46%	54%	-
Election day (10 May)
Millward Brown	7 May 2015	-	54%	41%	5%
Millward Brown	13 April 2015	-	55%	40%	5%
Millward Brown	30 March 2015	-	52%	41%	7%
Millward Brown	16 March 2015	4%	53%	37%	6%
PPW	2–8 March 2015	-	62%	38%	-
Millward Brown	16 Feb 2015	10%	59%	27%	4%
CBOS	5–11 Feb 2015	7%	65%	19%	9%

== Results ==
Duda took a narrow first-place finish over Komorowski in the first round of the election on 10 May 2015, forcing the incumbent into a runoff. The result was described as a surprise, as the Komorowski camp and many political observers expected him to perform better or perhaps win outright. Paweł Kukiz, who finished third in the first round of voting, declined to endorse either Duda or Komorowski, instead offering to moderate a debate between the two candidates. Komorowski declined to participate, and the debate was never held.

In the second round of the election on 24 May, Duda unseated Komorowski in what was until 2020 the closest presidential election since Poland became a democracy. He defeated the incumbent by a margin of approximately three percentage points, according to official results.

Results of the first round

Candidate	Party	First round		Second round	
Candidate	Party	Votes	%	Votes	%
Andrzej Duda	Law and Justice	5,179,092	34.76	8,630,627	51.55
Bronisław Komorowski	Independent (PO)	5,031,060	33.77	8,112,311	48.45
Paweł Kukiz	Independent	3,099,079	20.80		
Janusz Korwin-Mikke	KORWiN	486,084	3.26		
Magdalena Ogórek	Independent (SLD)	353,883	2.38		
Adam Jarubas	Polish People's Party	238,761	1.60		
Janusz Palikot	Your Movement	211,242	1.42		
Grzegorz Braun	Independent (KWWGB „Szczęść Boże!”)	124,132	0.83		
Marian Kowalski	National Movement	77,630	0.52		
Jacek Wilk	Congress of the New Right	68,186	0.46		
Paweł Tanajno	Direct Democracy	29,785	0.20		
Total		14,898,934	100.00	16,742,938	100.00
Valid votes		14,898,934	99.17	16,742,938	98.53
Invalid/blank votes		124,952	0.83	250,231	1.47
Total votes		15,023,886	100.00	16,993,169	100.00
Registered voters/turnout		30,688,570	48.96	30,709,281	55.34
Source: PKW, PKW

Vote share
Second round
Duda	51.55%
Komorowski	48.45%
First round
Duda	34.76%
Komorowski	33.77%
Kukiz	20.80%
Korwin-Mikke	3.26%
Ogórek	2.38%
Jarubas	1.60%
Palikot	1.42%
Others	2.01%

== Reactions ==
Komorowski said after the release of the exit poll that it was important to respect the result of the vote. He conceded defeat that evening and wished Duda "a successful presidency".

Duda hailed his victory as a vote for change. His campaign manager said the election showed that the Law and Justice bloc could win parliamentary elections scheduled for autumn, something that the party achieved.

Many world leaders, including United States President Barack Obama, German Chancellor Angela Merkel, and Russian President Vladimir Putin, congratulated Duda on his victory.

== See also ==
- 2015 Polish parliamentary election
- History of Poland (1989–present)
- Polish Constitutional Court crisis, 2015
