= Marian Kowalski (politician) =

Polish political activist, columnist and former bodybuilder

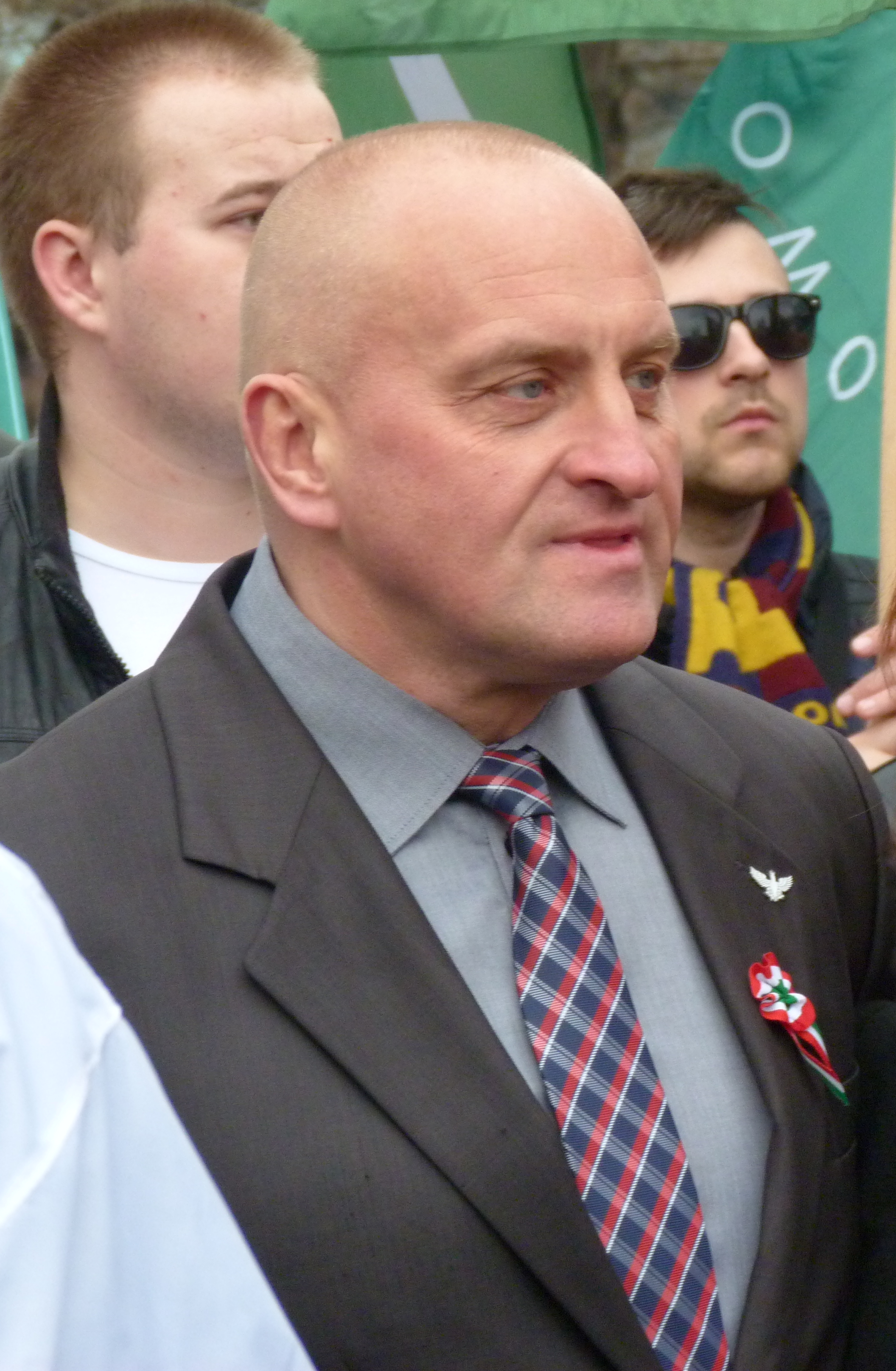
Marian Kowalski

Marian Janusz Kowalski (born 15 August 1964 in Lublin) is a Polish political activist, columnist and former bodybuilder. He was the official candidate of the National Movement for the office of President of Poland in the 2015 Polish presidential election and served as Vice-Chairman of the party from 2014 to 2015. In the first round he received 0.52% of votes, which gave him ninth place among the candidates.

From February 2016 until August 2018 he was the co-host of the political video podcast "Against the Tide" ("Idź Pod Prąd”) along with Pastor Paweł Chojecki. In November 2017 he became the chairman of the "11 November Movement". He resigned his membership in August 2018 when he parted ways with Paweł Chojecki.

Since late 2019 he has been a vocal supporter of the Law and Justice party.
