= Leszek Nowak =

Polish philosopher and legal theoretician

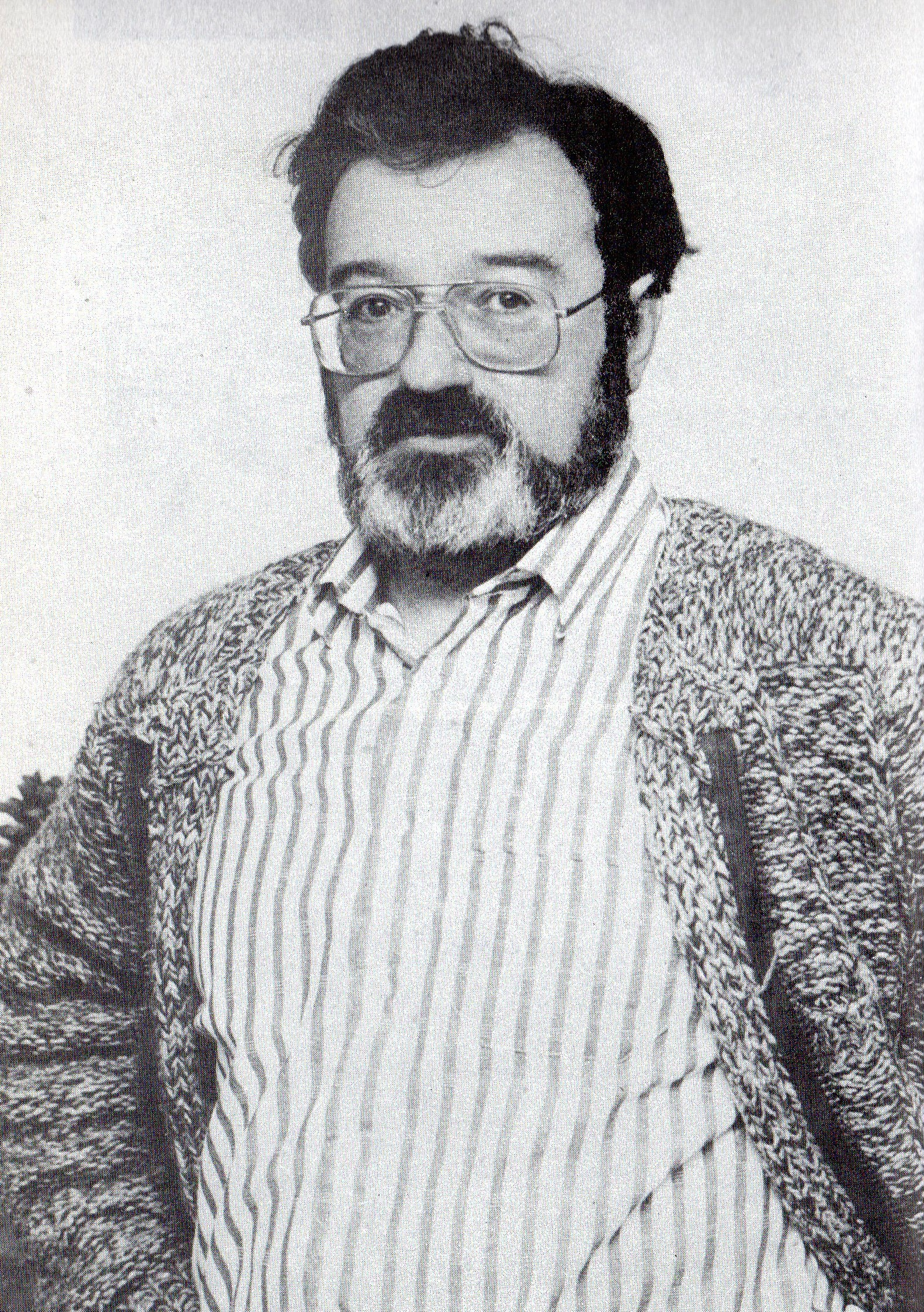
Leszek Nowak (before 1992)

Leszek Nowak (7 January 1943 – 20 October 2009) was a Polish philosopher and legal theoretician.

== Biography ==
=== Education ===
In 1965, he graduated in law from Adam Mickiewicz University's Faculty of Law and Administration, having written Master of Jurisprudence (M.Jur.) thesis under the supervision of Zygmunt Ziembiński, who introduced Nowak to the field of legal theory and convinced him to major in the subject. In 1966 he completed his Master of Philosophy (M.Phil.) degree in philosophy at the University of Warsaw under the supervision of Janina Kotarbińska. In 1967 he obtained a Doctor of Law (LL.D.) degree, writing a dissertation on the legal interpretation, the rule of law and semiotic functions of language. He obtained his habilitation (post-doctoral degree) in 1970, was subsequently published as a book on the methodological foundations of Karl Marx's Das Kapital.

=== Ideas ===
Nowak got his professorship in 1976, at the age of 33. At that time he was the youngest professor in Poland and the author of the methodological conception – the idealizational theory of science. His theory was inspired by ideas he found in Marx’s writings. He made them explicit and precise by using the language of contemporary logical philosophy.

In 1977 he started to work on a new, generalized social theory, which he called the non-Marxian historical materialism. In this theory real socialism occurs as the most oppressive system in the history of the hitherto known societies. Nowak was aware of the risk of working on such a theory in the country of real socialism but he did not decide to accept intellectual compromise and in 1979 disseminated the typescript of his book. During the time of Solidarność movement he spent all energy to educate union members and to reveal the oppressive nature of socialism. He was interned on 13th of December 1981 and spent a year in jail. In 1985 he was expelled from the university and in 1989 his professorship was reinstated.
