= 2021 Polish protests =

2021 Polish protests may refer to:

- Media Without Choice
- 2020–21 women's strike protests in Poland

== See also ==
- Polish rule-of-law crisis
