= Judiciary of Poland =

The judiciary of Poland (Polish: sądownictwo w Polsce [sɔn.dɔvˈɲi.t͡stfɔ v ˈpɔl.st͡sɛ]) includes all authorities exercising the judicial power of the Polish state on the basis of Chapter 8 of the Constitution. (Note: There are many other legally established quasi-judicial bodies, e.g. judicial disciplinary panels of self-regulating professions, but they are not courts within the meaning of the Constitution and are not covered in this article.) The Polish judiciary operates within the framework of civil law, like most of continental Europe.

The Constitution formally divides the judiciary into the courts (sądy) and the tribunals (trybunały). The courts process the vast majority of cases and are tasked with administering justice (wymiar sprawiedliwości). Administrative courts (sądy administracyjne) review complaints challenging the legality of administrative proceedings. Military courts (sądy wojskowe) are criminal courts for servicemembers stationed in Poland. All other cases (including cases where jurisdiction is not specifically mentioned) are processed in common courts (sądy powszechne). The Supreme Court is the court of last resort in all non-administrative cases, while administrative matters go to the Supreme Administrative Court. Everyone has a guaranteed right to appeal to a court of higher instance, but appeals and cassations to the apex courts are limited by law; therefore, only a fraction of cases may reach them.

Two tribunals operate separately from the rest of the judiciary. The Constitutional Tribunal (Trybunał Konstytucyjny) rules on the compliance of challenged statutes with the Constitution and is the only court in Poland that can strike down laws and regulations. The State Tribunal (Trybunał Stanu), which convenes very rarely, has exclusive jurisdiction over criminal trials of the highest state officials.

Court judges are appointed by the president of Poland upon nomination by the National Council of the Judiciary (Krajowa Rada Sądownictwa), an auxiliary body established for this purpose by the Constitution, and serve until they reach the mandatory retirement age of 65 or 70. (Note: The retirement age depends on several factors, such as the court of service, fitness to adjudicate, and the agreement of the KRS; and some judges might retire earlier. See also Minimal requirements and Rights and duties sections for details.) They are assisted or supplemented by various other judicial officials in the court, including court assessors, law clerks (asystent), registrars (referendarz) and lay judges (ławnik). Professionals such as bailiffs (komornik sądowy) and probation officers (kurator sądowy) act on the court's behalf to enforce judges' orders. In contrast to the court judges, the ones sitting in tribunals (with the exception of those sitting there ex officio) are elected by the Sejm with a simple majority of its deputies.

Several issues plague the Polish judiciary. The courts are widely seen as too slow, and trust in the court system is low among the general population. Changes to the judiciary carried out from 2015 by the ruling United Right coalition, ostensibly aimed at remedying these handicaps, caused much controversy and provoked an ongoing constitutional crisis. The Law and Justice-led coalition was widely seen as trying to subjugate the courts to political control, which created a deep conflict between judges appointed before the conservative coalition made changes to the judiciary ("old judges") and their supporters and those appointed by the new rules ("neo-judges", neosędziowie). The Constitutional Tribunal, widely seen as captured by the Law and Justice party, issued decisions aiming to thwart the application of the unfavourable rulings of the ECJ and the European Court of Human Rights by asserting they were issued outside the courts' competences and without regard to the Polish Constitution. These international courts found that several key parts of the Polish judiciary do not guarantee impartiality or are improperly constituted.

== Structure ==
The scheme summarising the structure and appeal sequences of the Polish judiciary, using names provided by the Ministry of Justice

A map of Polish common courts, with those of the same hue belonging to the same district court, and areas of roughly the same colour belonging under the jurisdiction of an appeal court (Note: The map does not feature regional court splits in Poznań, Wrocław, Gdańsk, Szczecin, Katowice and Lublin. The former two cities have three regional courts, the rest have two courts each.)

This section describes the legal state of the structure of the judiciary as of 21 December 2025.

=== Common courts ===
The common courts (sądy powszechne), according to article 177 of the Constitution, are the courts of general jurisdiction, i.e. they rule on all cases in which the jurisdiction has not been explicitly transferred to other courts. This includes a broad range of cases, including in civil, criminal, labour, economic and insurance law. The territorial jurisdiction of these courts and their creation is regulated by the minister of justice.

Poland has a three-tier system of common courts. Most of the cases land in one of 319 regional courts (sądy rejonowe), whose rulings may be appealed to 47 district courts (Polish: sądy okręgowe). (Note: Translating the names of the two lowest instances of Polish common courts into English may cause problems, because the designations used internationally, such as by the European Union, as well as by some government agencies like Statistics Poland, may be used by the Polish Ministry of Justice (MoJ) in an exactly opposite sense, creating confusion. All further references to the courts in this article will feature the translations as provided by the MoJ, or the Polish names in italics.) The latter courts also hear some cases in their original jurisdiction, which tend to be cases where high sums of money are disputed, the ones about serious crimes, and some that deal with narrow subjects, like intellectual property, surveillance warrants, competition law, and personal rights. District court rulings issued in the original jurisdiction may be appealed to one of 11 appeal courts (Polish: sąd apelacyjny). The appeal courts also house trial disciplinary court panels for judges, but in select cases, trials are reserved for the Chamber of Professional Responsibility of the Supreme Court. (Note: Disciplinary Chamber until 15 July 2022) After the courts of two instances have reviewed their cases, a cassation or its equivalent (see below) may be lodged in the Supreme Court in cases allowed by law.

Apart from their strictly judicial duties, the common courts in Poland maintain several registries. The National Court Register (Krajowy Rejestr Sądowy) maintains information about most companies in Poland; other such databases include the land and mortgage registry (księgi wieczyste), registry of press outlets, political parties, pension and investment funds, family foundations, ships, and pledges.

=== Military courts ===
The military courts are specialised criminal courts for the Polish Armed Forces and its civilian personnel, as well as foreign soldiers and their personnel during their duties if international agreements allow them to be tried on Polish soil. There are seven garrison military courts (wojskowy sąd garnizonowy) under the jurisdiction of two district military courts (wojskowy sąd okręgowy), which roughly correspond to the regional and district common courts, respectively. The creation of military courts and their territorial jurisdiction are regulated by the minister of defence, while the minister of justice makes internal regulations for the courts. Judges in military courts must be officers in the Polish Armed Forces.

According to article 653 of Code of Criminal Procedure (KPK), most of the courts-martial begin in garrison military courts, whose ruling may be appealed to the district military court. Article 654 of KPK mentions exceptions to these cases, which include any cases that would have been otherwise tried by a sąd okręgowy, crimes committed by officers of the rank of major or higher, or by foreign servicemembers. The disciplinary panels of district military courts will also hold trials for disciplinary cases against military judges, except for those heard by the Chamber of Professional Responsibility as the original disciplinary jurisdiction.

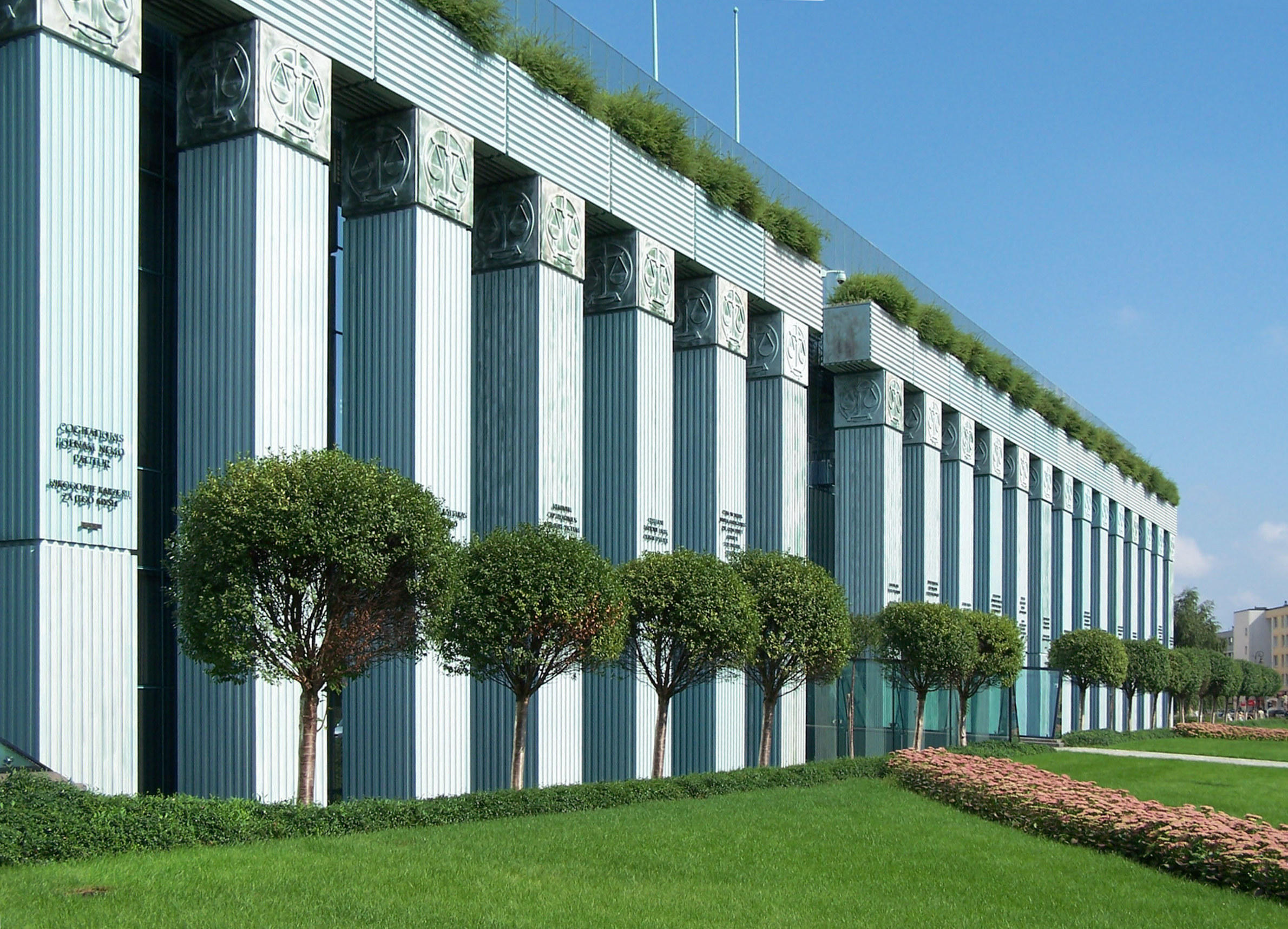
View of the façade of the Supreme Court. The building also houses the State Tribunal

=== Supreme Court ===
The Supreme Court (Sąd Najwyższy) is the highest court for verdicts made in common and military courts. It is technically separate from both.

In its main capacity, it serves as a court of cassation reviewing selected verdicts of the courts of second instance, which cannot be appealed further (i.e., district courts or district military courts for cases originating in regional or military garrison courts, respectively; and appeal courts for cases originating in district courts). For some staturorily created regulatory colleges, cassations are also possible against the rulings of their disciplinary organs.

If the case originates within a district military court, a disciplinary panel either for common court judges (affiliated with an appeal court), military court judges (affiliated with a district military court), or for public prosecutors (affiliated with the minister of justice), the Supreme Court will process it as a court of second instance because all of these organs are directly below the Supreme Court in the judicial hierarchy. As an exception, any disciplinary cases against its own judges, or the most grave disciplinary cases against public prosecutors as well as against common or military court judges, are tried in the Supreme Court. (Note: In cases when a public prosecutor or a justice of a common or military court has committed a serious crime or has engaged in "political activity", the trial will be held in the Disciplinary Chamber, while appeals will be heard by an enlarged panel of the same chamber. Given the appointment of the Disciplinary Chamber by the partisan KRS and the prohibition to question the appropriateness of the appointment of the judges, opponents have nicknamed the legislation a "muzzle law". From 15 July, disciplining judges for questioning the appointment or independence of a judge if this is related to adjudicating cases will no longer be allowed.)

Among other duties, the Supreme Court reviews all complaints about referendums and parliamentary, European Parliament and presidential elections and certifies the validity of these. The Court is also able to present its opinion on the draft bills that affect the judicial interpretation of other legislation.

The Supreme Court is led by the First President of the Supreme Court, who is also ex officio the President of the State Tribunal and a member of the National Council of the Judiciary. It is legally divided into five chambers (izby) headed by the Presidents of the Supreme Court. The Civil Chamber reviews civil, economic and family law cases; the Criminal Chamber rules on criminal matters and in all cases related to the military courts. The Labour and Social Insurance chamber issues rulings on labour law in cases not related to the Supreme Court judges themselves, which are reviewed by the Chamber of Professional Responsibility. The latter hears also disciplinary cases of common, military and Supreme Court judges, as well as those of public prosecutors. The Chamber of Extraordinary Control and Public Affairs makes decisions about countrywide elections, while also ruling on some narrow areas of law (e.g. competition cases) and hearing complaints about technical issues of judgements (e.g. if a party to the case objects to the lack of independence of judges or the speed of processing the case).

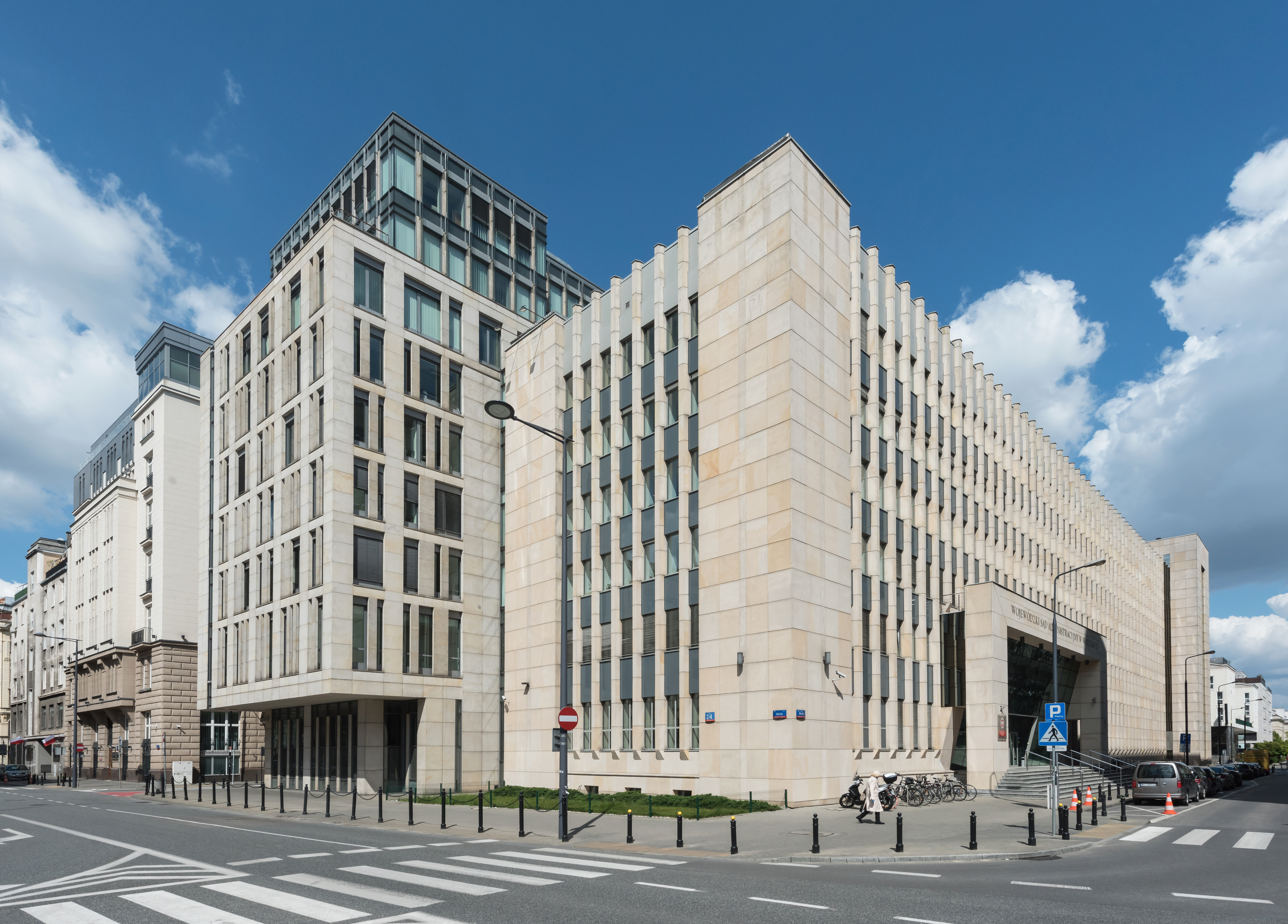
This complex houses both the most important administrative court (the Supreme Administrative Court, left) as well as the busiest one (the Voivodeship Administrative Court in Warsaw, right)

=== Administrative courts ===
Before a party can seek redress in an administrative court, all administrative appeal options (if available) must be exhausted, thus making the challenged decision final. The bodies to which these appeals should be lodged are outlined in article 17-18 of the Code of Administrative Procedure. If unsatisfied with the outcome of the administrative appeal of the decision, the party may further challenge it by submitting the judgment for judicial review through a complaint to one of the 16 voivodeship administrative courts (wojewódzki sąd adminstracyjny, WSA).

The administrative courts in general hear complaints on decisions and administrative rulings of government bodies (article 3 of the Law on Proceedings Before Administrative Courts, or PPSA), though some decisions may be exempted from the administrative courts' jurisdiction by statute. They may not substitute the judgment of administrative organs and will only control the validity of their decisions according to administrative law. Administrative courts notably do not accept witness nor expert testimony other than that obtained during administrative procedures.

A cassation complaint may be brought to the Supreme Administrative Court (Naczelny Sąd Administracyjny, NSA), which is the court of last resort for administrative law matters. Despite being called a cassation, it may be lodged against any ruling of the lower court due to the constitutional guarantee of judicial review, there being only two levels of administrative judiciary. It is also the court that resolves jurisdiction disputes between organs of local government, between local government boards of appeal and between these institutions and those of the central government. The NSA additionally hears disciplinary proceedings against administrative judges, both on trial and on appeal. This court is divided into three chambers: Finance (Izba Finansowa), which resolves tax-related issues, Commerce (Izba Gospodarcza), which deals with issues related to financial instruments and corporate law, and the General Administration (Izba Ogólnoadministracyjna) chamber which deals with issues not covered by the other two chambers.

=== Constitutional Tribunal ===
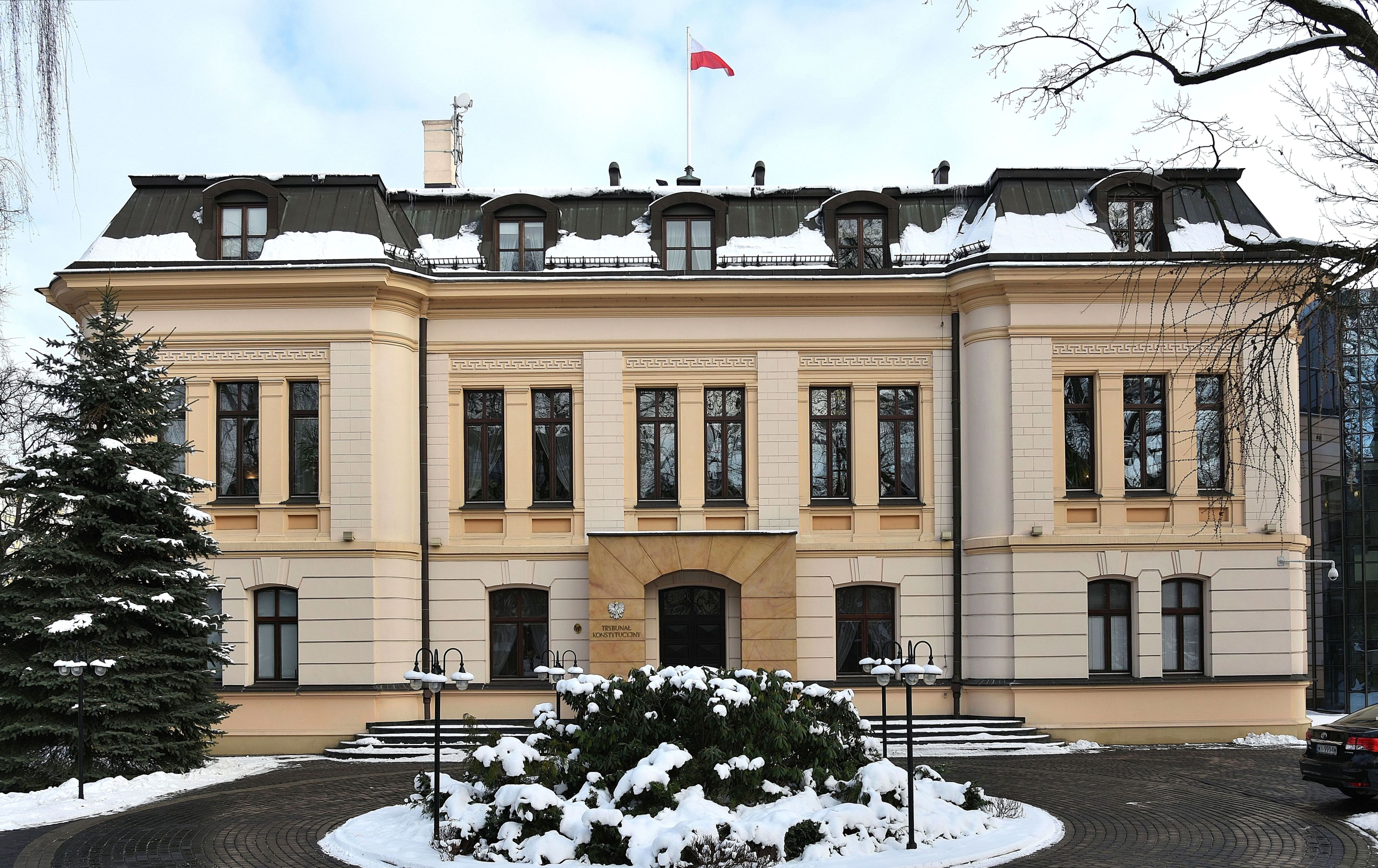
Constitutional Tribunal of Poland

The Constitutional Tribunal (Trybunał Konstytucyjny) is the judicial organ competent for constitutional law cases, similar to those existing in many European countries. While it is often called a "top court", it is technically a tribunal, distinct from the courts. Its main task is to review the constitutionality of laws, such as ratified international agreements, laws enacted by the Parliament, as well as regulations issued by executive organs. Such review may be initiated upon submission by a party mentioned in article 191 of the Constitution. According to article 122(3) and article 133(2), the President, before signing a law or an international treaty, may ask the Tribunal to assess their constitutionality. Also, article 79 of the Constitution grants the right to lodge a constitutional complaint challenging the laws applied to the contested decision or verdict, but only after all other legal steps have been exhausted. In all of these cases, should the Constitutional Tribunal find the law or regulation unconstitutional, it has the power to strike it down.

Additional duties of the Tribunal include deciding whether a political party's purpose violates the Constitution, ruling on the jurisdiction disputes of central government organs mentioned in the Constitution, and declaring the President incapable of performing their duties if they were not able to communicate their disability to the Marshal of the Sejm. According to article 190 of the Constitution, all of the Tribunal's decisions are non-reviewable and binding. (Note: In 1997–1999, article 239 of the Constitution provided that a 2/3 supermajority of the Sejm was empowered to reject a Tribunal's ruling)

=== State Tribunal ===
The State Tribunal (Trybunał Stanu) is a special judicial organ with exclusive jurisdiction over criminal trials of the highest political office holders in cases defined by the Constitution, namely (among active ones): the President, the Prime Minister, ministers, the President of the National Bank of Poland, the President of the Supreme Audit Office, members of the National Broadcasting Council (KRRiT), and legislators. The President may only be tried by the State Tribunal; ministers are tried for all abuses of office and breaking the laws and the Constitution, other high executive officers are tried for breaking the laws and the Constitution, while legislators may only appear before the State Tribunal for using their businesses to buy property of government institutions or profiting from them. The Tribunal holds both trials and appeals, though these are heard by different panels of State Tribunal judges. The decisions of the Tribunal cannot be appealed to other bodies and may not be annulled by pardon (article 139 of the Constitution).

In practice, the State Tribunal is used very rarely. It has only issued three verdicts since its inception in its current design in 1982. Only two people have been convicted by the State Tribunal. Impeachment of important politicians requires supermajorities: the Constitution provides that a 2/3 majority in the National Assembly (a body formed on rare occasions by all Sejm and Senate members sitting together in a joint session) is needed to vote in favour of impeachment of the president of Poland, and that only a 3/5 majority in the Sejm may indict the prime minister of Poland or the members of his cabinet. An additional complication is the inherently political nature of such referrals to the State Tribunal. Due to the rarity of its operation, doubts have been raised about whether this system of accountability of politicians is effective.

== Procedure ==
Poland is a country whose law is based on the civil law legal system. As is often the case with civil law countries, the proceedings, even though they have some characteristics of the adversarial system, are predominantly grounded in the inquisitorial system. The judges are supposed to take an active part in investigating the facts of the case, particularly in criminal law cases, and pre-trial proceedings are extensive. There was a brief period of reform of the procedures in the direction of a more adversarial system, but it was reverted after the Law and Justice party came to power in 2015.

The laws in Poland often make reference to various specific procedures, which in most cases relate to one of the laws below. These describe the rules of procedure and evidence, along with detailed roles of each party and court official:

- the Code of Civil Procedure in general, and, in particular cases, the Bankruptcy Law, the Restructuring Law, and Title IX Section 3 of the Public Procurement Law, for civil law matters;
- the Petty Offences Procedure Code, the Code of Criminal Procedure, the Penal Enforcement Code, Title II of the Fiscal Penal Code, Chapter 3 of the Act on Disclosure of Information about Documents of State Security Bodies from the Years 1944–1990 and the Contents of these Documents, and Title II of the Act on Maritime Chambers, for criminal matters;
- the Act on Juvenile Delinquency Proceedings, which is based on civil procedure but includes criminal procedure elements;
- the Code of Administrative Procedure, the Law on Proceedings Before Administrative Courts and the Act on Enforcement Proceedings in Administration for administrative matters;
- the Act on Organization and Procedure Before the Constitutional Tribunal and the Act on the State Tribunal, for proceedings before those judicial bodies.

Except for cases before the Constitutional Tribunal, any party to a judicial proceeding is guaranteed the right to appeal a decision or a ruling to a higher court (the two-instance principle, zasada dwuinstancyjności, as defined by the articles 78 and 176 of the Constitution). The venues of appeal vary greatly by designation, depending on the trial court and the type of case, as specified in the relevant section. Just like trial courts, courts of the second instance address the dispute on the merits, which means that they will address claims raised in the appeal, check if the trial court ruling correctly applied the law and directly modify or substitute their judgments if they disagree with the lower court. However, appeals are not new trials, and the higher court will generally rely on trial records.

Cassations are different. Firstly, they may only argue a point of law and procedural errors and not the underlying facts. Unlike appeals, the Supreme Court need not take up cassations. Of the four types of cassations recognised by Polish law ("extraordinary" cassation, "ordinary" cassation, extraordinary complaint and complaint on a second instance court verdict), only the first one can be filed in virtually any case at any time, but this right is reserved to the Public Prosecutor General, the Ombudsman or the Children Ombudsman in cases concerning minors. Other methods of complaint/cassation have limitations or may be even barred by law.

Poland does not operate on binding precedent, instead relying on whatever statutes are in force, but the verdicts of the Supreme Court (SN) and of the Supreme Administrative Court (NSA) are widely followed in their respective domains of law. Nevertheless, their rulings may bind the lower courts in particular cases. For example, if the court of the second instance requests guidance from the Supreme Court about laws that it struggles to apply, the conclusion of the SN legally binds the court but only in that particular case. Additionally, the Supreme Court may issue internal legal principles (zasady prawne) approved by at least 7 judges, which in fact are law interpretations issued for mandatory use by other SN judges when issuing their verdicts. These regulations do not bind lower courts. In administrative courts, however, these internal legal principles are required to be followed both by NSA judges and by WSA judges, and any deviations considered by a lower court should be referred to a 7-member panel of the Supreme Administrative Court. Notably, although verdicts of the Constitutional Tribunal "have universal legal force" and, as Jackowski argues, are approximately equivalent to the acts of parliament in the hierarchy of Polish law, the reasoning with which the verdict comes is not binding.

According to article 193 of the Constitution, judges may request legal guidance from the Constitutional Tribunal. They may also send a preliminary reference to the European Court of Justice (ECJ) in European Union law matters, which was even the case for the Constitutional Tribunal itself. Responses to both types of requests are binding on the court which sent the reference. Since Poland is a member of the Council of Europe, citizens may appeal the contested ruling to the European Court of Human Rights after exhausting all legal remedies in Poland, and the verdict will bind Polish authorities.

== Staff ==
=== Judges and court assessors ===
==== National Council of the Judiciary ====
The National Council of the Judiciary (Krajowa Rada Sądownictwa, KRS) is a constitutional body that has exclusive authority to nominate candidates for court judges; it also nominates candidates for court assessors (asesor sądowy), who eventually may become judges. Despite the theoretical possibility that the people with appropriate experience in practising law may aspire to the bench in higher courts, in practice, the vast majority of candidates for positions in higher courts has been nominated by the National Council of the Judiciary among the judges already holding office in a lower-instance court.

Article 187 of the Constitution defines the composition of the council. One member is appointed by the President of Poland, there are four Sejm members and two senators, and fifteen court judges (appointed at the same time due to a ruling of the Constitutional Tribunal) from all branches of the courts, who are appointed for four-year terms. The First President of the Supreme Court, the President of the Supreme Administrative Court and the Minister of Justice are given their seats ex officio. Prior to 2018, the National Council of the Judiciary Act apportioned the fifteen judges by quotas. A 2011 law mandated two Supreme Court judges, two appeal court judges, eight district court judges, two administrative court judges, and one military court judge. The requirement for strict apportionment has since been abolished. Also before 2018, all of the member judges were chosen by the judges themselves, as has been the custom; however, the Sejm has since been granted the power to appoint the members among the judiciary by a simple majority vote, thereby effectively granting control over the KRS to whoever happens to have the majority in the lower house of the Polish parliament. The Constitutional Tribunal ruled that a 2024 act that would have reverted the election method to the pre-2018 model was unconstitutional because that same law proposed restricting voting rights to judges appointed by the partisan-controlled National Council of the Judiciary.

===== Procedure of appointment =====
The appointment of new judges and court assessors happens in two stages. First, the KRS submits its list of candidates for approval to the President. Refusal by the KRS to include a candidate in the nominations list may in general be contested in the Supreme Court, but according to current law (which in that respect was found by the ECJ to be likely in violation of European Union law), there is no legal recourse in the case when the KRS denies the Supreme Court nomination. Then, according to the constitutional and statutory regulations as of February 2025, the President appoints new judges and court assessors among those nominated by the KRS upon receiving their oath.

There is no timeframe within which the President must publish their decision. Whether the President may refuse or refrain from appointing a person nominated by the National Council of the Judiciary as a candidate for judicial office is a subject of scholarly dispute, with some contending that the role intended for the President by the fathers of the Constitution is purely formal or ceremonial, while others consider it a prerogative exercised by the President at their discretion, a view supported by the absence of any constitutional deadline for a pending appointment. In practice, there have been instances where the President refused to promote nominated candidates to judgeship. According to a 2017 analysis, there have been only 20 cases out of more than 5,000 that the President refused to appoint candidates nominated by the KRS. In 2022, President Andrzej Duda refused to sign 11 promotions to the judiciary and in 2025, his successor Karol Nawrocki declined to appoint another 46 judges.

In case law, the administrative courts have repeatedly found lack of jurisdiction in respect of the presidential appointments of judges or their refusal, and the Constitutional Tribunal ruled consistently that these decisions are not subject to judicial review. The Constitutional Tribunal asserted in a controversial decision in K 3/21 that the European Union law allows the courts neither to control the legality of the judicial appointments by the President nor the legality of nominations or their refusal by the National Council of the Judiciary, declaring both activities to be unconstitutional.

===== Rights and duties =====
The title of judge is granted by the President for life, but all of the judges must retire from active duty by the age of 70 (see table below). They may also be sent on leave if the courts change territorial jurisdiction, including by abolishment, or if the judge is physically or mentally unable to perform their duties (article 181 section 3 and 5 of the Constitution). Judges are immune from legal persecution and non-removable unless by a decision of a court; moreover, they cannot be imprisoned or arrested without the consent of a disciplinary court (articles 180–181 of the Constitution).

The court assessor is a position existing in the lowest courts of Poland, who can best be described as a judge on a trial period. The institution briefly disappeared from the Polish legal system as the previous regulations about court assessors, which included an increased role of the minister of justice, were found by the Constitutional Tribunal and the European Court of Human Rights not to be guaranteeing enough judicial independence. Since their reactivation in 2016, they have been appointed by a process similar to the way in which the judges are appointed. Court assessors share the same rights and responsibilities as that of regular judges and may issue verdicts and orders in the majority of cases. Exceptions include orders to detain a suspect during pre-trial proceedings, review of a decision to decline to take up the case or discontinue it, and family law matters.

There are some differences between court judges and court assessors. Unlike in the case with judges, the time of assessors' service is limited by law, as they may only exercise judicial duties as an assessor for four years in common courts and five years in administrative courts; however, after four years of assessorship in common courts, or two years in administrative courts, these temporary judges may apply for a position in a regional court or a voivodeship administrative court, respectively. Also, the requirements to serve as an assessor are somewhat lower (see table below). (Note: In administrative courts, assessors must additionally have at least four years of legal experience.)

=== Judges sitting in the tribunals ===
The tribunals, unlike the courts, are not under the purview of the National Council of the Judiciary and their judges are not nominated by the KRS. Instead, the nominators may be a group of 50 Sejm members or the Presidium of the Sejm (the Marshal of the Sejm and the vice-marshals). According to article 194 of the Constitution, the Constitutional Tribunal judges are then elected by the Sejm by a simple majority for a nine-year non-renewable term, which starts upon taking an oath administered by the President. Whether it is valid for the Sejm to appoint judges in advance (for the terms starting during recess or beyond it) and whether the Sejm could have invalidated an appointment of a judge if the oath was not yet taken, or whether the President could legally withhold the administration of the oath, is the issue of the Constitutional Tribunal crisis that started in 2015.

The State Tribunal consists of 19 members. Article 199 of the Constitution says that 18 of them (including two vice-chairpersons and 16 ordinary members) are to be elected by a simple majority by the Sejm for the duration of its term, while the position of the Chairperson of the State Tribunal is held ex officio by the incumbent First President of the Supreme Court).

In parallel with judges sitting in courts, the ones sitting in the tribunals are also immune from legal persecution and non-removable unless by a decision of the respective tribunal; moreover, they cannot be imprisoned or arrested without the consent of the respective tribunal.

=== Other judicial positions ===
The law clerks (asystent sędziego) also serve on the court but do not issue rulings, instead they assist judges in their decision-making and reduce their workloads. The position is held available only to trained jurists with a graduate degree. During court proceedings, the judges are also assisted by a court reporter (protokolant), who will, in addition to recording court proceedings, summons parties to the courtroom and performs routine tasks for the judge. Court reporters do not need to have any law experience.

The category of registrars, also known as court division officials or court referendaries (referendarz) is a relatively recent addition to the courts, being first introduced in 1998. The registrar is the person responsible for administrative matters of the judicial procedure and rulings (such as payment orders and enforcement of some court orders). In common courts, a registrar is also normally the person who heads the land registration chamber of the court or that of the economic law chamber insofar as it relates to liens. The person may also serve as a judge in bankruptcy cases and is the officer in charge of cases about electronic writs of payment. The registrar also has some roles in criminal cases – for instance, the officer may reroute a potential criminal case to voluntary mediation, may decide to provide legal aid to a party upon its request and may hear witnesses remotely. In administrative courts, the referendarz, in addition to administrative duties as described above, is a mediation officer by default.

The courts may usually also appoint special officers to execute their court decision. For example, probation officers (kurator sądowy) are employees of the court that assist it in resocialisation efforts and perform certain other activities. Bailiffs (komornik sądowy), while not employees of the court, execute orders on behalf of the court that aim to settle debts.

The lay judges (ławnicy) are non-professionals embodying the "societal factor in the organs administrating justice" envisaged by the article 182 of the Constitution. They adjudicate cases together with professional judges in some family and labour law cases, and investigate serious crimes. Their role and number has diminished somewhat over years, and their service is limited by law to 12 days per year, with only exceptional extensions. They are elected by municipal councils from candidates aged 30–70 years, and are assigned to one court only; some professionals may not become lay judges (see table below).

=== Remuneration ===
The number of staff in each category, the basic salary as determined by law, and the mean salary for some jobs, are given in the table below.

Number and salaries of judicial workers of the court
Type of employee	Number, full-time equivalent	Baseline salary by law (multipliers of the mean monthly salary, unless otherwise noted)	Mean monthly salary (zloty), full-time equivalent, in 2023
Court judges	Up to 9,993		
regional court	6,071	2.05–2.50, depending on work experience	19,751.61
district court	2,756	2.36–2.92, depending on work experience	23,922.59
appeal court	483	2.75–3.23, depending on work experience	27,053.29
Supreme Court	95	4.13; 4.7495 after serving for 7 years Add 1.2 for the First President of the Supreme Court, 1.0 for the President of the Supreme Court (head of a chamber), 0.7 for leaders of sections (divisions of a chamber), and 0.5 for their deputies	N/A
garrison military court	Up to 38	According to their military rank but not less than a regional court judge	N/A
district military court	Up to 20	According to their military rank but not less than a district court judge	N/A
voivodeship administrative courts	422	As an appeal court judge	N/A
Supreme Administrative Court	108	As in the Supreme Court	N/A
Assessors	608	1.64 (80% of the basic salary of a judge) – common courts 2.36 in administrative courts	13,100.88
Law clerks	3,855	5,000–8,000 PLN in common courts; in administrative courts, 5,400–9,100 PLN for law clerks, 5,400–11,200 PLN for senior law clerks.	7,257.59
Registrars	2,674	1.5375–1.71 for registrars, 1.8445–1.938 for senior registrars, depending on length of work	16,049.36
Probation officers	5,112	Anchored at 1,667.60 PLN in 2003 and increased every year according to indices issued by the government for public sector workers	10,334.39
Lay judges (Note: Technically not considered employees of the court but serve on it)	9,186	5.412% of the mean monthly salary (Note: The statute says that lay judges must get "2.64% of the basic salary of the judge", which is 2.05 times the average salary.) for every day of service 0.66% of the mean monthly salary in per diem	N/A
Constitutional Tribunal judges	15	5 5.8 for the vice-president, 6.2 for the President of the Constitutional Tribunal	N/A
State Tribunal judges	19	10% of the mean monthly salary for every day of service + per diem	0 PLN – did not convene
Note. 1. All court officers receive work bonuses, with an incremental increase of 1 percentage point each year until they have worked for more than 20 years in the judiciary (setting at a maximum of 20%). In the Supreme Court and the Supreme Administrative Court, there is no minimal time after which the bonus kicks in, while in other courts, 5 years must pass. As state employees, judges are eligible for the thirteenth salary; additionally, they are exempt from social security contributions (ZUS) and receive jubilee benefits, as well as housing assistance.: 2. The salary is calculated using the mean salary of the second quarter of the year preceding the current year times the multipliers as given above. For example, in 2024, the mean salary of Q2 2023 is taken, which was 7,005.76 PLN (for 2025, the baseline is 8,038.41 PLN).

== Minimal requirements ==
Several laws as well as the Constitution set the criteria which the candidates must meet in order to serve in the bodies exercising judicial power of the Polish state. The common requirement of all judges is that they must be Polish citizens of "flawless character" and must enjoy full civil rights; in addition to that, the Constitution bars political party and trade union members to join the judiciary, and forbids performing public activities that may undermine the independence of the judge or the courts. All statutes relevant to the justice organs forbid prospective judges from being a central government employee or a member of parliament; only State Tribunal members may work in local government organs. Professors and habilitated doctors of law at a Polish tertiary education facility may seek nomination to any of the judicial positions (assessors as well as judges), provided they also pass the criteria unrelated to necessary experience. Some of the criteria, not mentioned in this paragraph, are summarised in the table below.

Criteria to become a judge
Criteria	Common and military courts			Administrative courts		Supreme Court	Constitutional Tribunal	State Tribunal (Note: The First President of the Supreme Court is an ex officio President of the State Tribunal; see the column for the Supreme Court for requisite qualifications)
Criteria	Sąd rejonowy or military garrison court	Sąd okręgowy (common or military)	Appeal	Voivodeship (WSA)	Supreme (NSA)	Supreme Court	Constitutional Tribunal	State Tribunal
Multiple citizenship	No			Allowed		No	Must fulfil all criteria to serve in the Supreme Court or the Supreme Administrative Court	Allowed
Criminal record	Must not have been convicted of an intentional crime prosecuted by the state prosecutor or of a deliberate tax fraud (for Supreme Court judges, this also includes suspended sentences) In common courts, candidates born before 1 August 1972 must produce a statement about their involvement (or lack thereof) with the Communist state security and military intelligence authorities; if they did have connections with them, they are barred from serving in the Supreme Court						Must fulfil all criteria to serve in the Supreme Court or the Supreme Administrative Court	Must not have been convicted
Age bracket (years)	29–65 (70) (Note: May be continued to 70 years on request of the judge who is about to reach the age of 65 years if the National Council of the Judiciary approves their request to continue serving on the bench)			35–65 (70)	40 (Note: Does not apply to those who have worked in the voivodeship administrative court for at least three years, effectively setting the lowermost age at 38 for these judges)-65	40–65	Must fulfil all criteria to serve in the Supreme Court or the Supreme Administrative Court	N/A (see also Necessary experience entry)
Necessary experience	Must have at least a master's degree in law recognised in Poland (Note: Candidates for military judges are enlisted in active military service and must pass an officer exam to begin judicial duties) Must pass a judicial or a prosecutorial exam and work for 3 years as an assessor or be a judge of other courts or work as a prosecutor or as a counsel for the General Counsel to the Republic of Poland (PGRP) for 3 years or practice law for 3 years	Has been a regional court judge, a garrison (trial) military court judge or a prosecutor for 4 years or was a judge of a district military court or of an administrative court or practiced law or worked for the PGRP for 6 years	Has been a judge, a prosecutor, practiced law, or worked for the PGRP for 10 years	Must have at least a master's degree in law recognised in Poland Has been a judge, a prosecutor, practiced law, or worked for the PGRP for 8 years (Note: The President of Poland may exceptionally request to admit a person with less experience to the bench) or has been a civil service worker tasked with applying or creating administrative law for 10 years or has worked as an assessor for the WSA for 2 years	Has been a judge, a prosecutor, practiced law, or worked for the PGRP for 10 years		Must fulfil all criteria to serve in the Supreme Court or the Supreme Administrative Court	The vice-presidents of the State Tribunal, and at least half of its members must meet requirements for becoming a judge

Criteria for other judicial workers
Criteria	Assessor		Law clerk		Registrar		Probation officer	Lay judge	
Criteria	Common courts	Administrative courts	Common courts	Administrative courts	Common courts	Administrative courts	Probation officer	Common court	Supreme Court
Multiple citizenship	No	Allowed							
Criminal record	Must not have been convicted of an intentional crime prosecuted by the state prosecutor or of a deliberate tax fraud	"Flawless character" required, but no formal requirement for a clean criminal record							
Age bracket (years)	No lowermost age	At least 30 years old	At least 24 years old	No lowermost age	At least 24 years old	No lowermost age		30–70	40-60 at the time of appointment
Necessary experience	Must have a master's degree in law recognised in Poland, go through three years of apprenticeship and pass a judicial or prosecutorial exam	Must have a master's degree in law recognised in Poland Has worked as a judge, prosecutor, counsel for the PGRP, or practiced law for 4 years or has been a civil service worker tasked with applying or creating administrative law for 6 years	Must have a master's degree in law recognised in Poland		Must have a master's degree in law recognised in Poland, and pass one of the six exams: for registrars, judges, prosecutors, notaries, for lawyers or for attorneys at law or pass an apprenticeship for judges or prosecutors	Must have a master's degree in law recognised in Poland and have 3 years of experience as a civil service worker tasked with applying or creating administrative law	Must have at least a master's degree in psychology, pedagogy, sociology, or law, go through an apprenticeship for probation officers and pass an exam (this requirement may be waived by the minister of justice)	Must finish full secondary school To be a judge in labour law cases, the person must know labour rights	Must finish full secondary school Must be appointed by the Senate
Note. To be a lay judge, the person must be elected by the residents of the gmina in which they run for office. To be a candidate, they must be employed, have a business or live in the municipality in which they run for office for at least one year. They also cannot be a (professional) judge, a prosecutor, a lawyer, be a member of the clergy, serve in law enforcement, the military or as a local government councillor, or be a member of other organisations whose decision may serve as a basis of litigation. Supreme Court lay judges cannot also be lawmakers, civil servants for central government agencies, notaries, party members or people found to have worked with security services or military intelligence in Communist Poland.

== Issues ==
=== Length of proceedings ===
The Polish court system is considered to be slow, particularly the common courts. In 2023, it took an average of just under 6 months for an average case to be processed in a regional court and about 10 months in a district court, with the time needed to process a case gradually rising since 2013. Longer proceedings are generally concentrated in the courts centred around larger cities; as of 2017, about 10% of cases required more than a year for resolution (with as much as 18.72% in Warsaw) and more than 1% of cases needed more than 3 years (of which almost 4% in Warsaw). The type of case is also a factor: in 2023, criminal trials in regional courts were on average finished in six months for felonies and three months for petty crimes, but litigation in labour law took almost a year on average to resolve, and adjudication of commercial disputes was even slower.

On the European level, Poland has slower proceedings in the highest courts, and has markedly slower processing of civil cases than the median. This problem was also noted by the United States Department of State and by the World Justice Project, which assigned the lowest grade to the timeliness of civil proceedings, which not only was behind other European countries but also much below the world average score. In criminal proceedings, the situation was still assessed as somewhat worse compared to its peers but was much better than in civil cases. In 2013, the Centre for Public Opinion Research (CBOS), a state-run pollster, found that by far the most common complaint about the Polish justice system was the length of court proceedings. On the other hand, the criminal cases and the voivodeship administrative courts are often quicker than the median among the Council of Europe members.

The problem with the length of proceedings has been recognised by both Polish and international courts. According to the statistics provided by the European Court of Human Rights (ECHR), from the time since Poland joined the Council of Europe in November 1991, out of 1,057 judgments that found Poland guilty of breaches of the European Convention on Human Rights, the biggest share of them – 452 judgments – concerned excessively lengthy proceedings. The ECHR ruled in 2015 in Rutkowski et al. v. Poland that Poland offered inadequate protections for parties who suffer from long court proceedings, some of which have been dragged for years, despite a law, itself created after as a result of another ECHR case, theoretically aiming to address the problem. The Constitutional Tribunal wrote in the reasonings of a 2011 case that a civil lawsuit was "expensive and long", and the vice-minister of justice said the same in 2014. The length of proceedings caused cases such as the murder of Grzegorz Przemyk by Communist authorities in 1983 to be closed inconclusively as the indictments went past the prescriptive period.

According to a 2020 survey of Polish lawyers and attorneys at law, 95.8% of those professionals said that the excessive length of proceedings had a systemic character; they also said that problems occurred both on the judicial and the prosecutorial side. Various reasons were suggested for those problems. Some were complaining about excessive caseloads (14.67 million cases per year for fewer than 10,000 judges) and overbroad spectrum of cases under the purview of the courts; others blamed delays in requesting and delivering opinions of expert witnesses, bad management practices, low salaries of law clerks and poor quality of law while the Civil Development Forum, a think tank, suggested that an excess of managerial positions distracting from adjudication of cases was at fault. At the same time, most lawyers were afraid to make complaints about inadequate speed of processing the case for fear of angering the judge, and only 12% believed that this tool was effective. According to a November 2021 poll by Rzeczpospolita, 54% of respondents did not believe that the reforms of the judiciary offered by the Law and Justice party would speed up the decision-making process.

=== Lack of popular support and trust ===
The trust in the judicial system among the general population is low. A large slump in the trust in the court system happened in 1998–2007, as people did not see the court system as impartial. Krystyna Daniel connected this slump to the general distrust of statutes and government organs, lengthy proceedings and media criticism (mostly around controversial court cases or irregularities in the judiciary). A particular plunge in support for the courts occurred in 2012, when numerous irregularities were found in the functioning of the courts in Gdańsk as they were investigating the insolvency of Amber Gold, a pyramid scheme company. (Note: The court case about the company itself, despite being filed in 2012, the year when the company went bust, was only resolved in May 2022. The district court issued its verdict in 2019; the appeal court was dealing with the case that had 886 volumes and more than 15,000 addenda.)

Only 25% approve of the current state of the judiciary, compared with 48% of negative voices, according to a September 2025 poll made by CBOS. The support for the courts has been oscillating around 30% since 2009, with little variation across party preferences. As for the Constitutional Tribunal, disapproval spiked following the 2015 crisis and further went up following its ruling restricting abortion, but criticism is concentrated among voters who are left-leaning, less religious and opposing the Law and Justice (PiS) party. The diminution of trust in the Tribunal, along with worsening efficiency, is widely considered to be the reason behind lower numbers of constitutional law verdicts since 2015 and requests for legal guidance from the courts.

In December 2021, CBOS found that 46% of people preferred to resolve cases informally by non-judicial means, which number steadily increased since 2014 and approached values experienced in the communist Polish People's Republic; only 38% declared that the judiciary was better equipped to do that. The 2025 European Union Rule of Law report notes that only 26% of the general population and 24% of companies have a good opinion of the independence of the court system. Changes to the courts pushed by Law and Justice did not seem to improve the perception of them and were not popular among the general electorate. According to a Rzeczpospolita poll in May 2022, only 14.2% of people approved the reform, compared to 53.6% of those who opposed it. Another poll, in December 2021, found that over 69% of people thought that the reform did not increase confidence in the courts.

=== Other issues ===
Some of the Polish courts have seen signs of nepotism, e.g. favouritism during competition for judge positions and in salaries. These problems have also plagued the National Council of the Judiciary, which prompted the Supreme Court to annul some of its recommendations. That said, before 2015, the extent of corruption in Polish courts was not considered to be large, but it worsened in subsequent years as political forces started to assert more influence on the judiciary.

Another issue of concern is the usage of the so-called testimony-mining custody, whereby a suspect is held in repeatedly prolonged detention in order to be compelled either to confess or to testify against other defendants, a practice officially illegal nevertheless still undertaken under formal disguise of various pretexts such as safeguarding the undistorted course of a proceeding; the Helsinki Foundation of Human Rights noted that an average pretrial detention lasted for more than a year and, in its opinion, was overused relative to the less invasive preventative measures such as bail and police supervision. A lack of petititoner-friendly communications, excessive red tape, and the excessive reliance on the letter of the law (lex) rather than the law itself (ius) are also noted as problems within the Polish judiciary. The Polish courts have also been severely impacted by the COVID-19 pandemic, in particular as related to the access to the justice system. The pandemic forced the courts to increasingly digitise its so far underused and inconsistently applied computer systems aiding decision-making, documentation and hearings; however, many documents are still being processed on paper and sent by post.

=== Rule of law concerns ===
When PiS took power in 2015, the party stated that it wanted to rid the judiciary of Communist legacy and root out corrupt judges. It also promised to remedy long-standing problems of slowness and red tape, which the media favourable to that party portrayed as evidence that judges are out-of-touch and self-interested. However, a series of reforms to the Polish judiciary started in 2015 has proved controversial. They met in particular with the disapproval of the European Union authorities, which initiated Article 7 proceedings against a member state for the first time. The rule-of-law crisis in Hungary and Poland served as a trigger for adopting the EU's conditionality mechanism, which may deny the receipt of EU budget funds if the rule of law deficiencies prevent a proper implementation of the EU budget, and led to a since-lifted suspension of Next Generation EU funds allocated for Poland. The European Parliament has pressed the European Commission to act on the breaches of the independence of the judiciary. It even filed a lawsuit against the commission for what it said was an inadequate response to the violations, but later dropped it.

==== Capture of the Constitutional Tribunal ====
The Constitutional Tribunal (TK), like other courts with appointments made by political bodies, experienced some form of bias in rulings, but it was not very different from the situation in the analogical institutions in other countries. Since 2015, however, the TK has been stuffed with appointees favourable to the Law and Justice party, including former politicians of PiS or friends of its leaders, leading scholars to see it as captured by the party's interests. The European Court of Human Rights and the European Court of Justice both ruled that the Tribunal, when ruling with the so-called doubling judges (sędziowie-dublerzy) instead of those whose term started before the term of the 2015–2019 parliament was set to constitute, violated the right to a fair trial as it was an improperly constituted court.

The Constitutional Tribunal delivered rulings aiming to insulate the justice system from external scrutiny. It argued in one case that ECHR had no jurisdiction to control the appointment of its own justices by asserting it was not a court within the meaning of the European Convention on Human Rights (described by Ewa Łętowska and Wojciech Tumidalski to be the Tribunal's "coming out") and then by expanding the ruling on the court system as a whole. As a result, the Ministry of Foreign Affairs told two people who won in the ECHR that they would not be paid compensations as the ministry argued that the Constitutional Tribunal's ruling forbade it from doing so.

The Tribunal also asserted that the treaties of the European Union were incompatible with the Polish Constitution insofar as they allowed the courts to question the appointments by partisan-controlled KRS or the President, aiming to thwart the application of ECJ's unfavourable judgments about the Polish judiciary and forcing it not to comply with ECJ's orders. This ruling sparked massive protests and raised concerns about Polexit. The ECJ found that the Tribunal's rejection of EU treaties was invalid, and the court could not be considered as impartial. It said that the Tribunal's rulings severely undermined the principle of primacy of European Union law and effectively denied protections afforded to residents of Poland under these laws, in particular as related to guarantees of an independent judiciary. In response to the verdict, the Tribunal again insisted that it was not bound by European Union laws.

When the government changed to the Law and Justice's opponents under Donald Tusk, the Tribunal repeatedly sought to make it harder for the new ruling coalition to implement its agenda. Attempts to break the impasse were derailed by presidents supported by PiS, who approve of the changes to the judiciary. The new government passed a motion in which it declared the Tribunal unable to discharge its duties and controversially declined to publish their rulings in the Journal of Laws, the official government gazette. and then passed budgets without any provision for salaries for members of the Constitutional Tribunal and the National Council of the Judiciary. The Tribunal asserted that the deprivation of salaries was unconstitutional, but the government refused to publish their ruling or comply with it.

==== Undue influence on judges ====
The problem of undue influence of judges in Poland has existed for some time. A sting operation by Gazeta Polska Codziennie triggered a political scandal in 2012 by exposing the fact that a judge of a court in Gdańsk acquiesced easily to procedural demands made in relation to a particular case during a phone call by a journalist pretending to be a senior officer of the Chancellery of the Prime Minister. The judge, Ryszard Milewski, was disciplined for that violation and sent to a Białystok court.

Since the reform of common courts and the Supreme Court started in 2017, the judges almost unanimously expressed concern about worsening judicial independence, fearing retribution for criticism of the new laws. Some of the most vocal opponents of the changes to the judiciary were targeted by the state prosecution, and disciplinary proceedings were abused in an attempt to silence critics who, for example, sent preliminary requests to the European Court of Justice asking to assess judicial independence. There were also cases of judges being submitted to disciplinary action after issuing a ruling in opposition to the party's interest or demands of the prosecutor in the particular case. In addition to that, a change to the statutes regulating the courts (often called the "muzzle law") made it an offence to question the validity of appointments of judges by fellow judges, in essence those appointed by a partisan-controlled National Council of the Judiciary, even if there were legitimate concerns about them. This statute was criticised by the Venice Commission for violating the judicial independence and severely limiting the judges' freedom of speech. The 2021 rule of law report by the European Commission said that the mere prospect of being prosecuted in a judicial body having no guarantees of independence had created a chilling effect for judges. Rzeczpospolita also reported that the catalogue of offences after which disciplinary proceedings are initiated broadens, some of which are not related to the functioning of the court, like speeding and driving under the influence. In March 2025, the government announced a draft bill seeking to abolish the muzzle law. Debates are ongoing.

==== Partisan control of the National Council of the Judiciary ====
An overhaul of the National Council of the Judiciary happened in late 2017, when the law came into effect that granted the Sejm powers to appoint 15 members of the judiciary (ruled legal by the Constitutional Tribunal in 2019); at the same time, the Tribunal ordered the judges on the council to be appointed for a collective term, rather than individually, as had been the case earlier. Both changes were very controversial. All judges that had served on the council were dismissed on 6 March 2018 without regard to their terms and substituted with judges favourable to PiS. The consensus of scholars is that a change to the term of some of the KRS's members ran afoul of the Constitution, though Mateusz Radajewski wrote that the Tribunal left the lawmakers with no better choice. The European Court of Human Rights, along with the scholars, criticised the Tribunal's decision in its ruling in March 2022 and ordered compensation for Jan Grzęda, a Supreme Administrative Court judge whose term was cut two years short. Another controversial provision was to lower the retirement age to 65 (thus removing about 40% of the Supreme Court members), with tying the prolongation of justices to the President's consent, but the ECJ ruled it to be illegal in light of European Union law.

In September and October 2018, the Supreme Administrative Court ordered a halt on Council's appointments to the Supreme Court to three of the five chambers, but the President ignored the NSA's order. The top administrative court later annulled around a dozen recommendations for appointment of new judges of the Supreme Court due to concerns about the lack of independence of the council. The Venice Commission urged not to approve the politicisation of the KRS, while numerous scholars, the European Court of Justice (ECJ) and the European Court of Human Rights (ECHR) questioned the independence or the constitutionality and thus the validity of nominations made by the partisan-controlled KRS (called "neo-KRS" by its critics, and its appointees as "neo-judges", neosędziowie). One of the most controversial changes was the creation of a disciplinary chamber of the Supreme Court, whose members were all nominated by the new iteration of the KRS, and which some have compared to the Star Chamber or to an extraordinary court (sąd wyjątkowy), which may not be created in peacetime. Due to the lack of impartiality, the National Council of the Judiciary was expelled from the European Network of Judiciary Councils, and major legal and judicial organisations in Poland, as well as former Council members, asked to boycott the 2022 nomination procedure.

Given the doubts about the validity of the new KRS as well as other laws concerning the common courts and the judiciary, several courts have made preliminary requests to the ECJ about the overhaul of the judiciary or issued rulings aiming to resist the changes. The Supreme Court declared the two new chambers, the Disciplinary and that of Extraordinary Control and Public Affairs, illegal, and found the new KRS "systemically not independent of political interest". While this was promptly overturned by the Constitutional Tribunal, arguing that European law was not above the Polish Constitution, the consensus of scholars was that the Tribunal exceeded its competences as it could not assess the constitutionality of the Supreme Court's resolutions.

The ECJ also delivered a judgment ordering the suspension of the Disciplinary Chamber, saying it has deep concern over this key element of the justice system overhaul. In addition to that, several judges and lawyers sued in the ECHR to declare the Supreme Court chambers, with the controlling majority being appointed by the new body, to be incompatible with the European Convention of Human Rights, and thus invalidate its rulings. The Strasbourg court agreed, declaring the Disciplinary Chamber, the Chamber of Extraordinary Control and Public Affairs and the Civil Chamber not to be independent and impartial tribunals established by law.

The courts have numerous problems with determining the proper way with dealing with requests for the judge to recuse, including whether recusal is mandated if the only reason for recusal is being appointed by the new KRS. Courts have seen contradictory rulings in this respect and there even has been a ruling allowing recusal of judges who themselves process a recusal request. Donald Tusk's government decided to publish all rulings of "new" judges with a preceding note listing ECHR and ECJ's rulings that question the impartiality and the correctness of the judges' nomination process.

The ambiguous status of "neo-judges" causes widespread chaos within the court system. 30 professional judges and almost half of lay judges of the Supreme Court refused to work with newly appointed judges due to their conviction that any such proceeding will be necessarily invalid; and some decided not to send the requests to delay mandatory retirement to the KRS because they do not recognise it as a properly constituted body. Their position is supported by the June 2022 legal principle of the Criminal Chamber of the Supreme Court, which reiterated that the partisan KRS "is not equivalent to the constitutional organ [regulated] by article 187 paragraph 1 [of the Constitution]" and ruled that newly appointed Supreme Court judges must resign. Three years later, the same chamber, and separately the Labour and Social Security chambers invalidated legal principles of the Chamber of Extraordinary Control and Public Affairs as they argued that a panel that included "neo-judges" was not a proper court. However, just after that, the latter two chambers reversed that legal principle and echoed the Constitutional Tribunal by asserting that no outside bodies can interfere with Supreme Court rulings, including those of the European Union; the head of the Chamber of Extraordinary Control and Public Affairs claimed that the ruling was actually pro-European.

===== Arbitrary secondment of judges =====
The minister of justice, according to law, may second (delegować) a judge to a lower or, in some circumstances, to the higher courts and to the Ministry of Justice. The minister may also second a judge to administrative courts, the Chancellery of the President, to the Supreme Court or to an institution subordinate to the Ministry of Foreign Affairs upon the requests of the leaders of these agencies. However, the law does not require that the decisions of secondment, or the revocation thereof, have justifications. This arrangement has been described as prone to abuse by some human rights groups and legal experts. The European Court of Justice ruled that the system of purely arbitrary delegation of judges, where the minister of justice is at the same time the top prosecutor, violates European Union law; the Polish Ombudsman also argued that the unlimited powers in issuing delegations ran afoul of several articles of the Constitution, including by infringement on the President's prerogative to appoint judges to the positions the President decides.

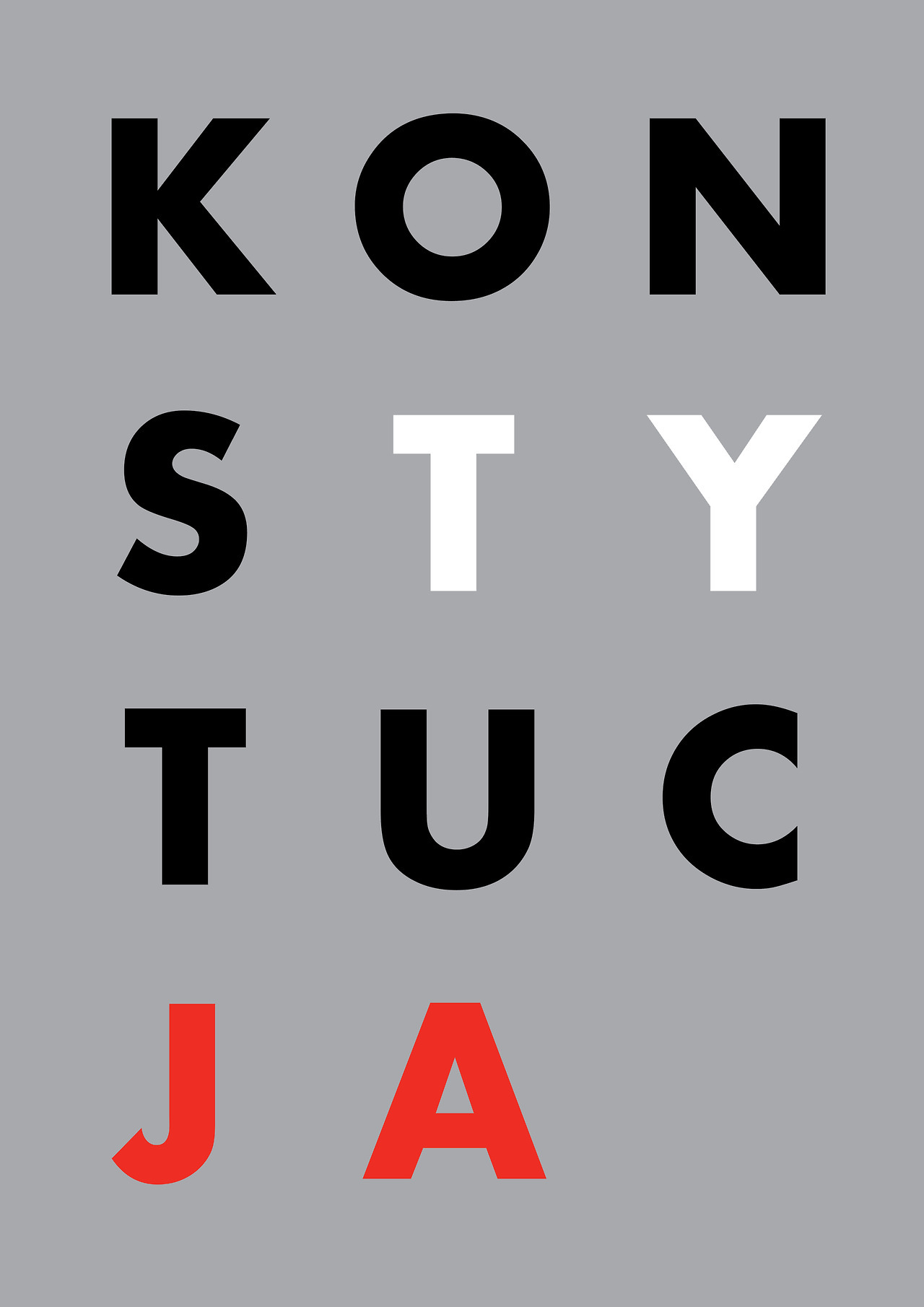
This "Konstytucja" (Constitution) graphic with highlighted "TY" (you) and "JA" (I) became a rallying cry for opponents of Law and Justice's changes to the judiciary

==== Repercussions in Poland and abroad ====
The judicial reforms have been met with fierce resistance from the judiciary, including the rank-and-file judges. For example, the Polish Bar and its leadership, the Polish Bar Council, reject the validity of judgments by the suspended disciplinary chamber of the Supreme Court. Numerous protests were started against the reforms. They were also initiated abroad in front of Polish diplomatic institutions.

The rule of law crisis has prompted several courts to temporarily cease honouring the European Arrest Warrants from Poland, including courts in the Netherlands, Germany, Ireland, Slovakia and Spain. However, the ECJ ruled that the courts may not do so unless there are reasonable doubts as to the possibility of getting a fair trial in Poland. The European Court of Justice found Poland to be in contempt of court for delaying the disbandment of the Disciplinary Chamber, which ultimately cost the country €320 million. The ECJ's ruling about grave violations of EU law by the Constitutional Tribunal is also likely to trigger fines unless the issue is promptly fixed.

== See also ==
- Law in Poland
- Law enforcement in Poland
- Lawyers in Poland

== Notes ==
This article incorporates text by the European Commission available under the CC BY 4.0 license.
