= 2020 Polish protests =

2020 Polish protests may refer to:

- Rainbow Night in August 2020
- 2020–2021 women's strike protests in Poland

== See also ==
- Polish rule-of-law crisis
