= Polish Supreme Court Disciplinary Chamber law =

Legislation that defines conduct standards for the majority of Polish judiciary

The Polish Supreme Court Disciplinary Chamber Law is legislation that defines conduct standards for the majority of the Polish Judiciary, namely the common and military courts and the Supreme Court, excluding the administrative courts and tribunals. It was enacted by the Sejm 223 votes to 205, on 20 December 2019. The Law was highly controversial leading to large scale protests and later fines by the EU due to its illegality within the union.

== Background ==
The bill was born as a continuation of the legislation following the 2015 Polish Constitutional Court crisis, further exerting political control on the courts.

== Overview of the law ==
The law established the Disciplinary Chamber of the Supreme Court and empowers it to punish ordinary court, military court and Supreme Court justices who engage in "political activity", including questioning the political independence of the panel. Punishments may include a fine, reduction of salary, or termination from their position. In comparison with other chambers, the law curbs the powers of the First President of the Supreme Court in regard to the Disciplinary Chamber in favor of the President of the Chamber, making it effectively “an autonomous body which only nominally is within the structure of the Supreme Court”.

The law also changed the manner in which the head of the Supreme Court of Poland is appointed. The Law and Justice party had previously attempted to oust the current head, Małgorzata Gersdorf, and her term expired in 2020. The law has been discussed as giving the government the practical ability to control and sack judges. The legislation was later found to violate EU judicial standards, with the government later being fined €320M.

== Legal status of the law ==
The Disciplinary Chamber created by the law was found to be illegitimate by the European Court of Human Rights in July 2021. It was replaced by the Professional Responsibility Chamber under a new law of June 2022.

== Reactions ==
Critics of the law called it draconian, and demonstrations against it took place throughout Poland.

The U.N. High Commissioner for Human Rights said that the bill "risks further undermining the already heavily challenged independence of the judiciary in Poland". The EU urged Poland not to pass the bill, and to consult the Venice Commission, yet it passed. The Association of Judges of Ireland condemned the Polish legislation. Koen Lenaerts, President of the Court of Justice of the European Union, warned that "You can’t be a member of the European Union if you don’t have independent, impartial courts operating in accordance with fair trial rule, upholding union law".

The Polish Supreme Court stated that the bill was a "continuation of the lawlessness of the 1980s". According to the court: "Everything is there: a ban on the freedom of speech by judges, the establishment of a surveillance mechanism and a drastic reduction of their right to have profiles on social networks". The Court further said that Poland overruling the primacy of EU law may force it out of the bloc.

Donald Tusk, former European Council president, warned the bill might force Poland out of the EU. Ombudsman Adam Bodnar said the law "violates the Constitution and the ground rules of the rule of law" and "would definitively put Polish courts and judges under the control of the legislative and executive branches of government". Special Rapporteur of the United Nations on the Independence of Judges and Lawyers Diego García Sayán and President of the European Association of Judges José Igreja Matos warned the legislation "runs contrary to judicial independence".

The Helsinki Foundation for Human Rights and the Committee for the Defence of Democracy organized protests throughout Poland against the bill.

José Igreja Matos, president of the European Association of Judges, stated on 18 January 2021 that "the muzzle law should be immediately blocked to put an end to the current dangerous intimidation of independent judges".

== See also ==
- Polish rule-of-law crisis
- Protests against Polish judiciary reforms
- Judicial independence
- Judiciary of Poland
