= Protests against Polish judiciary reforms =

Series of protests in Poland since 2017

Since 2017, a series of protests against judiciary reforms have occurred in Poland. Since Law and Justice took power in Poland in 2015, its influence rapidly extended to the judicial branch, through contended nominations that produced the 2015 Polish Constitutional Court crisis. The Law and Justice party argues that the reforms are needed to improve the efficiency of the judiciary, but the opposition, supported by a significant number of members of the judiciary, has been very critical of the reforms. The reforms have also been criticized by a number of international bodies. The European Commission invokes the Article 7 of the European Treaty against E.U. member Poland, denouncing recent judiciary reforms putting it under the political control of the ruling majority and citing "serious risk [to] the independence of the judiciary and the separation of powers".

The Polish judicial disciplinary panel law was approved by the Sejm on 20 December 2019. The bill empowers the Disciplinary Chamber at the Supreme Court of Poland to punish judges who engage in "political activity", including questioning the political independence of the panel. Punishment of judges may be a fine, reduction of salary, or termination from their position. The bill also changes the manner in which the head of the Supreme Court of Poland is appointed. Giving the government, in effect, the ability to control and sack judges the legislation violates EU judicial system legislation. Donald Tusk warned the bill might force Poland out of the EU. The Helsinki Foundation for Human Rights and the Committee for the Defence of Democracy organized protests throughout Poland against the bill.

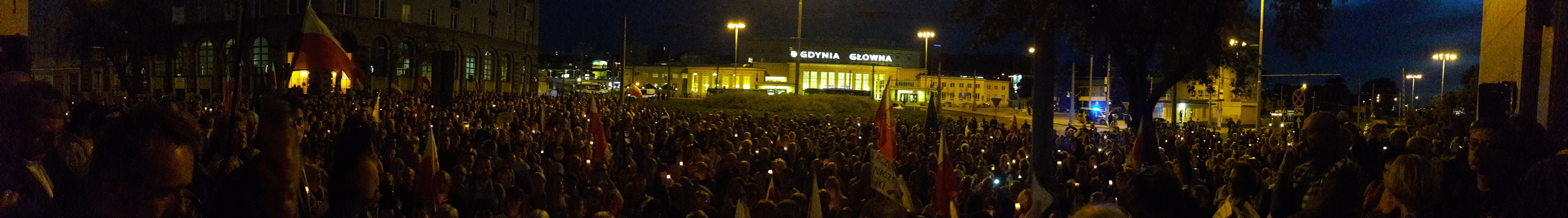
Civic protest "in defense of the courts" against an attempt to introduce 3 unconstitutional laws: about the National Court Register, the common courts and the Court Supreme, 22-24 July 2017, Constitution Square in front of the Gdynia District Court

In February 2020, former Constitutional Tribunal judges, including former Constitutional Tribunal presidents Andrzej Rzepliński (2010-2016), Marek Safjan, Jerzy Stępień, Bogdan Zdziennicki, and Andrzej Zoll described the tribunal as having "virtually been abolished".

By 2020, fourteen out of the fifteen judges had been appointed to the Constitutional Tribunal by the Sejm since the return in power of PiS in 2015, which was seen by the former tribunal presidents and judges as one of the signs of a lack of checks and balances against PiS' domination of three branches of government power.

== See also ==
- Polish constitutional crisis
- Polish judicial disciplinary panel law
- 2020 Polish protests (disambiguation)
- Media Without Choice
