= Media Without Choice =

February 2021 protest against advertising taxation in Poland

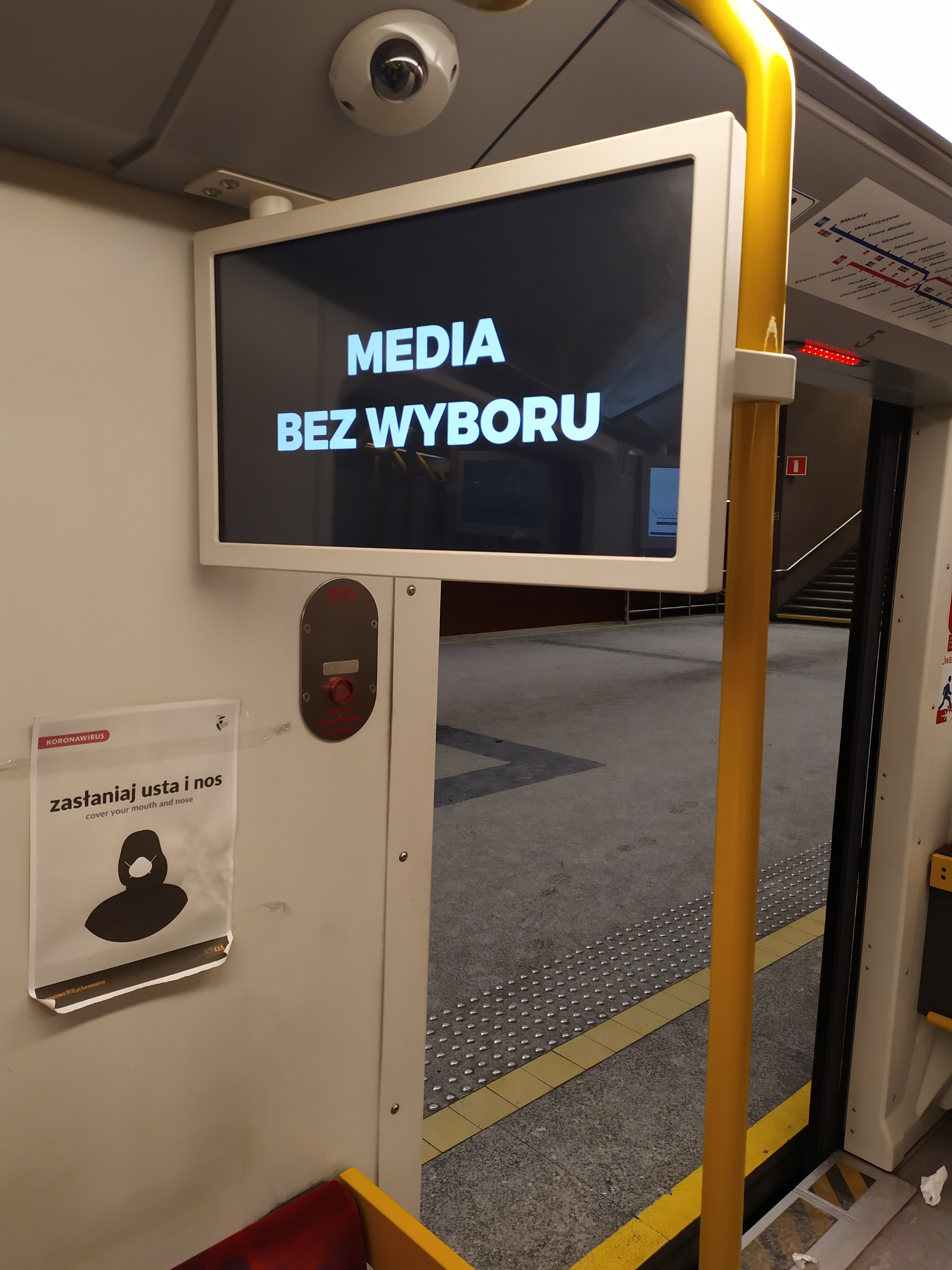
- Display in Warsaw Metro car with Media Without Choice communicate.
- Date: 10 February 2021
- Location: Poland (mostly mass media)

Media Without Choice (Polish: Media bez wyboru) was a one-day protest against the government of Poland due to a proposed tax on advertising. The protests began on 10 February 2021 and participants included paper journals, press-related internet portals, television stations, radio stations, and information portals. They protested by ceasing their usual activities, such as the publishing of news or advertisements, and turning off their transmissions.

The protest began on 4:00 AM UTC+01:00 (3:00 UTC) and continued for the next 24 hours during which media replaced information and advertisements with black backgrounds with messages such as "MEDIA WITHOUT CHOICE" and "THIS IS WHERE YOUR FAVORITE PROGRAM WOULD BE” spelled with capitalized white letters, sometimes with additional information about the action.

Protest included participation of Agora, the owner of Gazeta Wyborcza, TOK FM, Radio ZET and Gazeta.pl, TVN Discovery Group, the owner of TVN, TVN24, TTV, Cyfrowy Polsat, the owner of Polsat and Polsat News, Ringier Axel Springer, the owner of Onet.pl and Newsweek Polska, Bauer Media Group, the owner of RMF FM and nearly 60 others small, medium and large media companies. Some media, such as Radio Eska and Radio Nowy Świat, did not cease their transmissions but announced their participation in the protest. Television stations TVN and Polsat, for the first time, did not air news on their main information channels.

Additionally, on 10 February some people organized protests on the streets of cities of Łódź, Warsaw and Gdańsk, Poland.

== Background ==
Because of the 2020 COVID-19 pandemic, the Polish press' income that came from renting advertisement space fell by around 50%, and sales of most of the magazines fell significantly. In addition to the pandemic, the restrictions put on organization of the contests and conferences, as well as cultural and sporting events, has contributed to further decreases in the Polish media's income.

Internet and conventional advertising tax, which was newly proposed by the Mateusz Morawiecki cabinet, is an amendment designed to tax advertisement providers in Poland, which would apply to both conventional and internet advertisement; media such as radio and television, cinemas, press and out-of-home advertising. It is predicted that the tax will add around 800 million Polish złoty (around 215.5 million United States dollars) to government revenue. It is expected to be introduced in November 2021. It was suggested that the tax could bankrupt a great portion of smaller media-related companies in Poland.

In contrast, during the pandemic many European countries such as Germany, France, or the United Kingdom had initiatives designed to subsidize local media companies.

== Reactions ==
=== Ombudsman ===
The Ombudsman, professor Adam Bodnar, supported the protest and wrote: "If the boundary of what is acceptable keeps shifting, we will not have fair elections in 2023. Perhaps only enclaves of freedom will remain, in the form of some press titles or Internet radio stations."

=== Politicians ===
Madeleine Albright described the advertisement tax as "an attack on democracy and the rule of Law". Bix Aliu, chargé d'affaires at the embassy of United States in Warsaw, Poland, called free media "a cornerstone of democracy" and said that "the United States will always defend media independence". The European Commission had expressed alarm about the situation in Poland. The Polish Government spokesman, Piotr Müller, said that the tax is meant for "digital giants" and commented on the protest that "everybody wants to avoid the taxes". Various opposition politicians in Poland expressed their support for the protest, including Rafał Trzaskowski, Szymon Hołownia, Agnieszka Dziemianowicz-Bąk, Anna Maria Żukowska, Władysław Kosiniak-Kamysz, Jerzy Buzek, and Donald Tusk. Confederation Liberty and Independence, a far-right political party, also expressed their support.

=== Press ===
Various foreign media companies reported on the protest, including Politico, ABC News, U.S. News, BBC, The Washington Post, The Guardian, Reuters, Associated Press, Agence France-Presse, France 24, Deutsche Welle, Bloomberg L.P., Euronews, The Daily Telegraph, Frankfurter Allgemeine Zeitung, Wiener Zeitung and tagesschau.de.

Journals Le Figaro, Le Monde and Agence France-Presse described the protest as unprecedented.

=== Street protests ===
On 10 February 2021, protests were organized by inhabitants of some cities in Poland. In Łódź, several dozen people protested in front of the headquarters of Law and Justice party at the 143 Piotrkowska Street. In Warsaw, around 150 people protested on the Warsaw Insurgents Square. The protest started on 19:30 UTC+01:00 (18:30 UTC) in front of headquarters of state-controlled television Telewizja Polska (TVP) while their news program Wiadomości started. Activists of the All-Poland Women's Strike joined the protest. Protests were also held in front of the headquarters of TVP in Gdańsk.

== Reach ==
By 14:55 UTC 10 February 2021, the protests had reached 115 million internet users. During the first day of the protest, there were almost 2,500 publications about it. By 11 February, hashtags of the action, #mediabezwyboru (Media Without a Choice) and #protestmediów (protest of the media), had been used over 96,000 times and reached 37 million users, while hashtag #wolnemedia (free media) had reached 1.9 million.

== See also ==
- 2020–21 women's strike protests in Poland
- Protests against Polish judiciary reforms
