= 2015–present Polish rule-of-law crisis =

Political conflict centred on the rule of law in Poland

The Polish rule-of-law crisis is a political conflict ongoing since 2015 in which the Polish government has been accused of failing to comply with European and Polish constitutional law. The 2015 Polish parliamentary election resulted in the Law and Justice party (Prawo i Sprawiedliwość, PiS) winning control of both the presidency and Parliament. With this government trifecta (as a result of its participation in the United Right), PiS used its power to appoint judges to the Constitutional Tribunal in 2015, leading to the Constitutional Tribunal crisis. The government of Poland continued to expand its hold on the judiciary resulting in the 2017 Supreme Court crisis, and the 2019 Supreme Court Disciplinary Chamber law. These events allowed the legislature and executive of the Polish government to have de facto control over judges and their appointments.

These moves were condemned by the European Union (EU), which initiated an Article 7 process against Poland. The European Commission referred Poland to the European Court of Justice (ECJ), stating in 2017 that "the executive and legislative branches have been systematically enabled to politically interfere in the composition, powers, administration and functioning of the judicial branch." In 2019 and 2020, the ECJ ruled against Poland in Commission v Poland, ordering it to suspend several laws that interfere with the independence of the judiciary. These rulings have been largely ignored in Poland. The crisis briefly jeopardised the EU COVID-19 pandemic recovery budget (Next Generation EU), which allowed funds to be made available to EU member states on the condition of "rule of law", a clause that the Polish government under PiS and the Hungarian government under Viktor Orbán threatened to veto in 2020.

Since the changes to the judiciary, a number of protests took place as a result of either the changes themselves, rulings by the new judiciary, or other legislative action deemed to break European or international human rights legislation. This includes the Black Protest and Women's Strike against restrictions to women's rights (especially with regards to abortion), the Polish Sejm crisis against restrictions of press freedoms, and the 2020 LGBT protests in Poland against restrictions to LGBT rights, and the 2023 Polish protests in response to the oppression committed by the government by these actions. These rulings and legislative actions with the corresponding protest action exacerbated the crisis in Poland. After the 2023 Polish parliamentary election, the newly elected Donald Tusk–led coalition government began to reverse the PiS reforms. This has been opposed by both former president Andrzej Duda and incumbent president Karol Nawrocki.

== Background ==
=== Constitutional Tribunal ===
List of TC judges by seniority in June 2015
No	Judge	Nominated by (Note: The colors only represent the majorities that elected each judge, as the Polish Constitution of 1997 mandates that judges shall be independent and shall not belong to any political party (Article 195).)	Nomination date	End of term
1	Maria Gintowt-Jankowicz	PiS	6 November 2006	6 November 2015
2	Wojciech Hermeliński	PiS	6 November 2006	6 November 2015
3	Marek Kotlinowski	PiS	6 November 2006	6 November 2015
4	Zbigniew Cieślak	PiS	2 December 2006	2 December 2015
5	Teresa Liszcz	PiS	8 December 2006	8 December 2015
6	Mirosław Granat	PiS	27 April 2007	27 April 2016
7	Andrzej Rzepliński (President)	PO	19 December 2007	19 December 2016
8	Stanisław Biernat (Vice-President)	PO	26 June 2008	26 June 2017
9	Sławomira Wronkowska-Jaśkiewicz	PO	6 May 2010	6 May 2019
10	Stanisław Rymar	PO	3 December 2010	3 December 2019
11	Piotr Tuleja	PO	3 December 2010	3 December 2019
12	Marek Zubik	PO	3 December 2010	3 December 2019
13	Małgorzata Pyziak-Szafnicka	PO	5 January 2011	5 January 2020
14	Andrzej Wróbel	PO	29 May 2011	29 May 2020
15	Leon Kieres	PO	23 July 2012	23 July 2021
Nominated by PiS or its coalition partners (2006–2007)
Nominated by PO or its coalition partners (2007–2015)

The Constitutional Tribunal (TC) of Poland was founded in 1982 by the government of the Polish People's Republic. It oversees the actions of government, including legislative action, to ensure compliance with the Constitution of Poland. Judges are elected to the court by the Sejm and approved by the President. The court is made up of 15 judges who serve single nine-year terms and which point they are replaced through agreement of the Sejm and President. In 2015, before the crisis, the court was made up of ten justices nominated by the centre-right Civic Platform (PO) and five justices nominated by the right-wing nationalist Law and Justice Party (PiS).

=== Abortion law in Poland ===
In Poland, it was illegal to have an abortion except in cases where the mother's life was at risk, the pregnancy was a result of rape, or if the foetus had "severe and irreparable" impairment. The largely Christian conservative base of PiS follow the Catholic Church teaching on abortion. In 2017, a Pew Research Center poll showed 51% of Poles thought abortion should be illegal in all or most cases.

=== 2015 Polish presidential election ===
2015 Polish presidential election

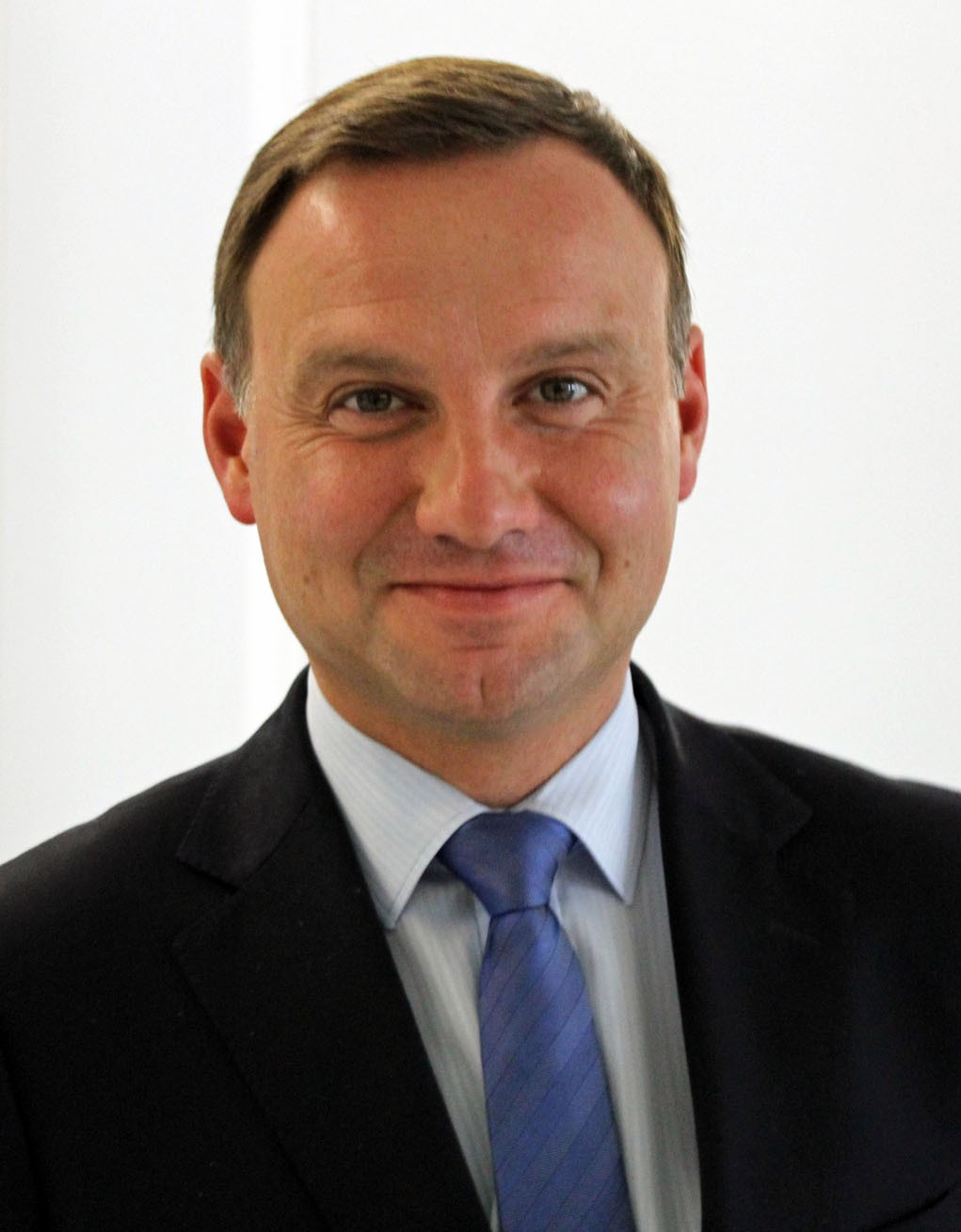
Andrzej Duda, Law and Justice (PiS)

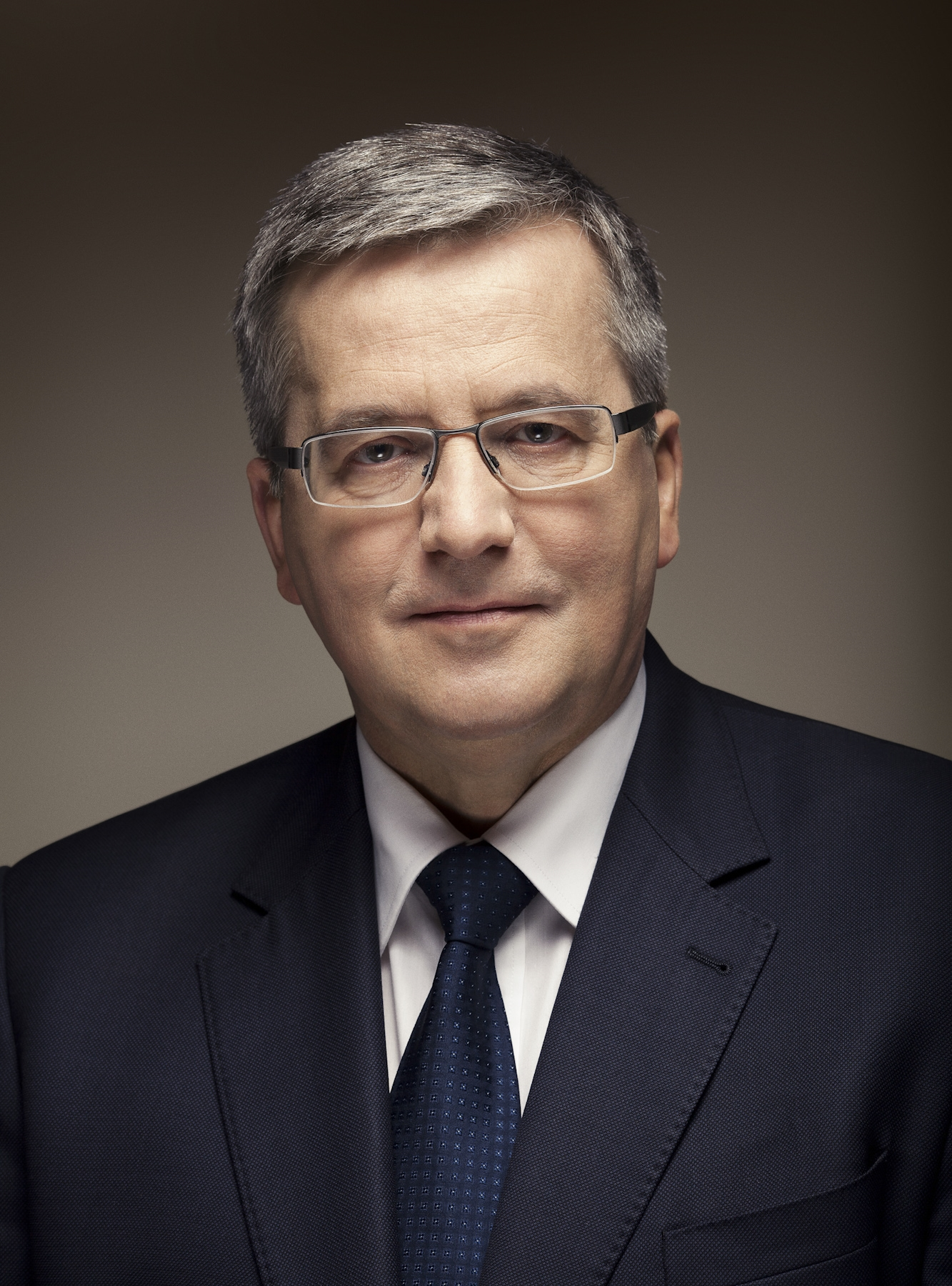
Bronisław Komorowski, endorsed by Civic Platform (PO)

In May 2015, Andrzej Duda was elected as President of Poland with a populist platform, defeating incumbent Bronisław Komorowski of the Civic Platform. Prior to the election, Komorowski was believed to be the favourite to win. Duda promised to block the Constitutional Tribunal nominations of the Civic Platform-controlled Sejm until after the 2015 Polish parliamentary election. The outcome has been described as a shock in many media, as observers feared a potential conflict between Poland and the European Union as well as Duda's authoritarian tendency.

=== European migrant crisis ===
Following the election of Duda, relations between the European Union and Poland soured, especially in relation to the ongoing European migrant crisis, where Duda refused to be part of the European migrant quota plan managed by the European Asylum Support Office, causing the EU to initiate sanctions procedures against Poland and other Visegrád Group member states.

== First Duda term (2015–2020) ==
=== 2015 Constitutional Court crisis ===
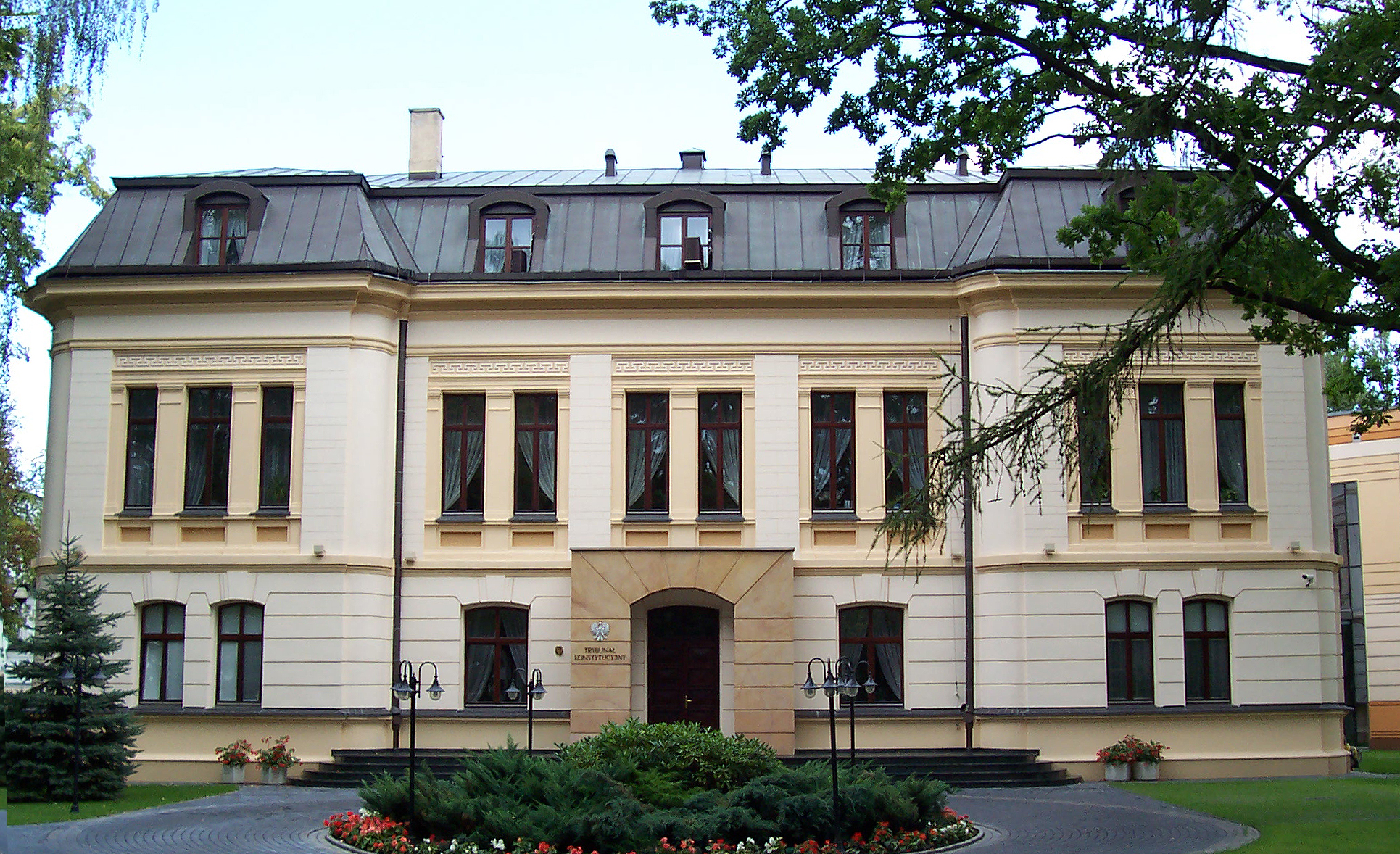
The Constitutional Court in Warsaw

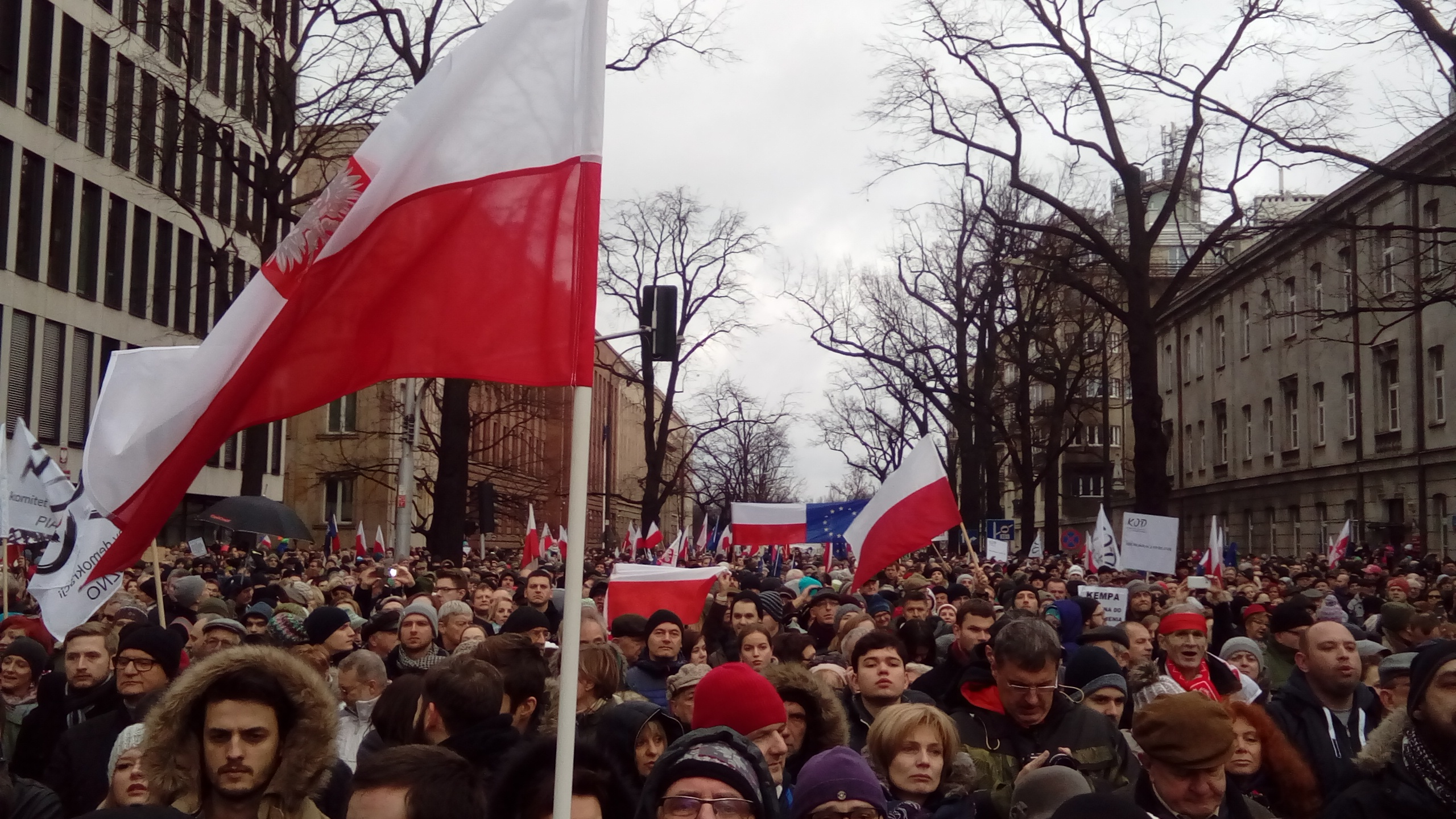
Protests against the appointment of new judges to the Constitutional Tribunal at rally organised by the Committee for the Defence of Democracy

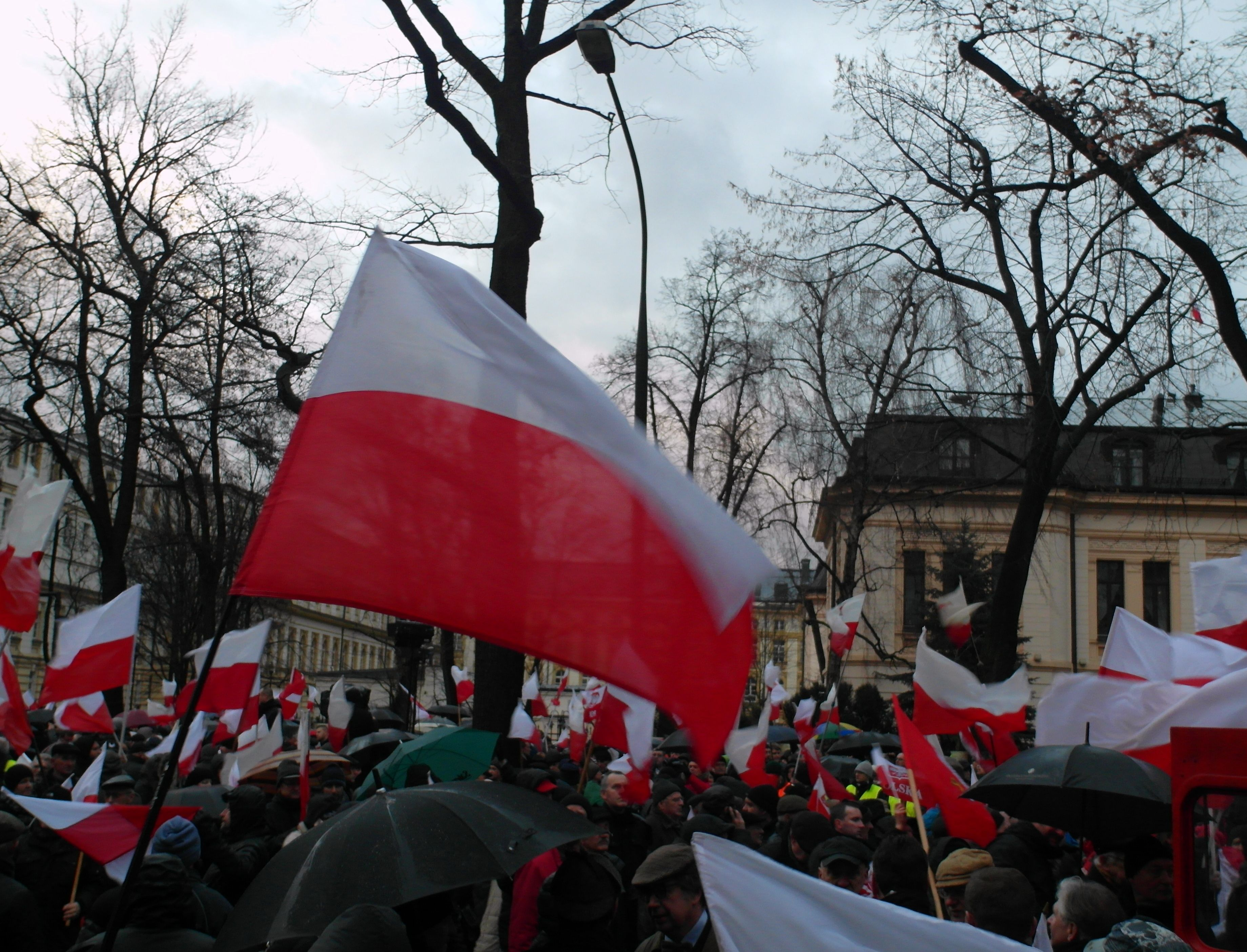
Protestors for the changes to the Constitutional Tribunal at a Law and Justice rally

Between the election of Duda and the start of the 8th Sejm on 12 November 2015, 5 seats on the TC were due to expire. The 7th Sejm, controlled by PO and its allies completed its election process for replacement judges; however, Duda refused to swear in these nominees until after the sitting of the 8th Sejm. Following the 2015 Polish parliamentary election in October 2015, PiS took control of the Sejm and elected its own five replacement judges, who were elected on 2 December and sworn in on 3 December by Duda. PO claimed this was unlawful, whereas PiS claimed that the initial election of judges by 7th Sejm was unlawful. On 3 December the TC ruled that 3 of the judges nominated by the 7th Sejm were legally elected; 2 were not. Despite the ruling, Duda did not swear in the legally elected judges.

The president of the Constitutional Tribunal dictated that the new five judges should not hear cases until the situation was settled; in order to combat this, PiS passed a series of laws through the Sejm and Senate which compelled the TC to allow the judges to hear new cases. The new legislation was signed into law on 28 December. In January 2016, the TC ruled the five new judges elected by the 8th Sejm were legally appointed, but in March 2016 ruled the new legislation unconstitutional. The latter ruling was ignored by the Polish government, which considered the ruling "advisory". The crisis provoked outrage in the European Union which began an investigation into Poland under Article 7 of the Treaty on European Union, describing the situation as threatening the rule of law. Protests both for and against the government of Poland occurred in Warsaw and other major Polish cities.

On 13 January 2016, the European Commission launched a formal rule-of-law assessment to determine a serious threat of a breach of Union law based on rules set out in 2014 and the provisions of Article 7 of the Treaty on European Union, regarding the amendments of the constitutional court and the public media law in Poland. A recommendation, the second step in the rule-of-law assessment, was issued on 1 June 2016. Iverna McGowan, director of Amnesty International's European Institutes office in Brussels, commented: "The willingness of the commission to use the rule-of-law framework is a positive step towards a more serious approach by the EU to speak out and hold its own member states to account on their human rights records." Hungary declared that it will oppose any sanctions against Poland.

On 11 March 2016, the Venice Commission of the Council of Europe, having been asked for an opinion by the Polish government in December 2015, assessed the amendments as crippling the Court's effectiveness and undermining democracy, human rights and the rule of law. On 13 April 2016, the European Parliament passed a resolution, by 513 votes to 142 and with 30 abstentions, declaring that the Parliament was "seriously concerned that the effective paralysis of the Constitutional Tribunal in Poland endangers democracy, human rights and the rule of law." In July 2016, the European Commission issued a statement outlining its recommendations regarding "the rule of law in Poland", including the swearing-in of the three judges elected by the 7th Sejm and the adherence to the March 2016 TC ruling declaring that changes to the structure and functioning of the TC were unconstitutional.

=== 2016 protests ===
==== Black Protest ====
The 8th Sejm held debates on reforming abortion law in Poland, in order to make them more restrictive. The votes on the new restrictive abortion legislation took place on 6 October and were voted down due to domestic and international pressure. Despite a lack of legislative changes, PiS MPs began ligation in order to see abortion become more restrictive.

==== Sejm crisis ====
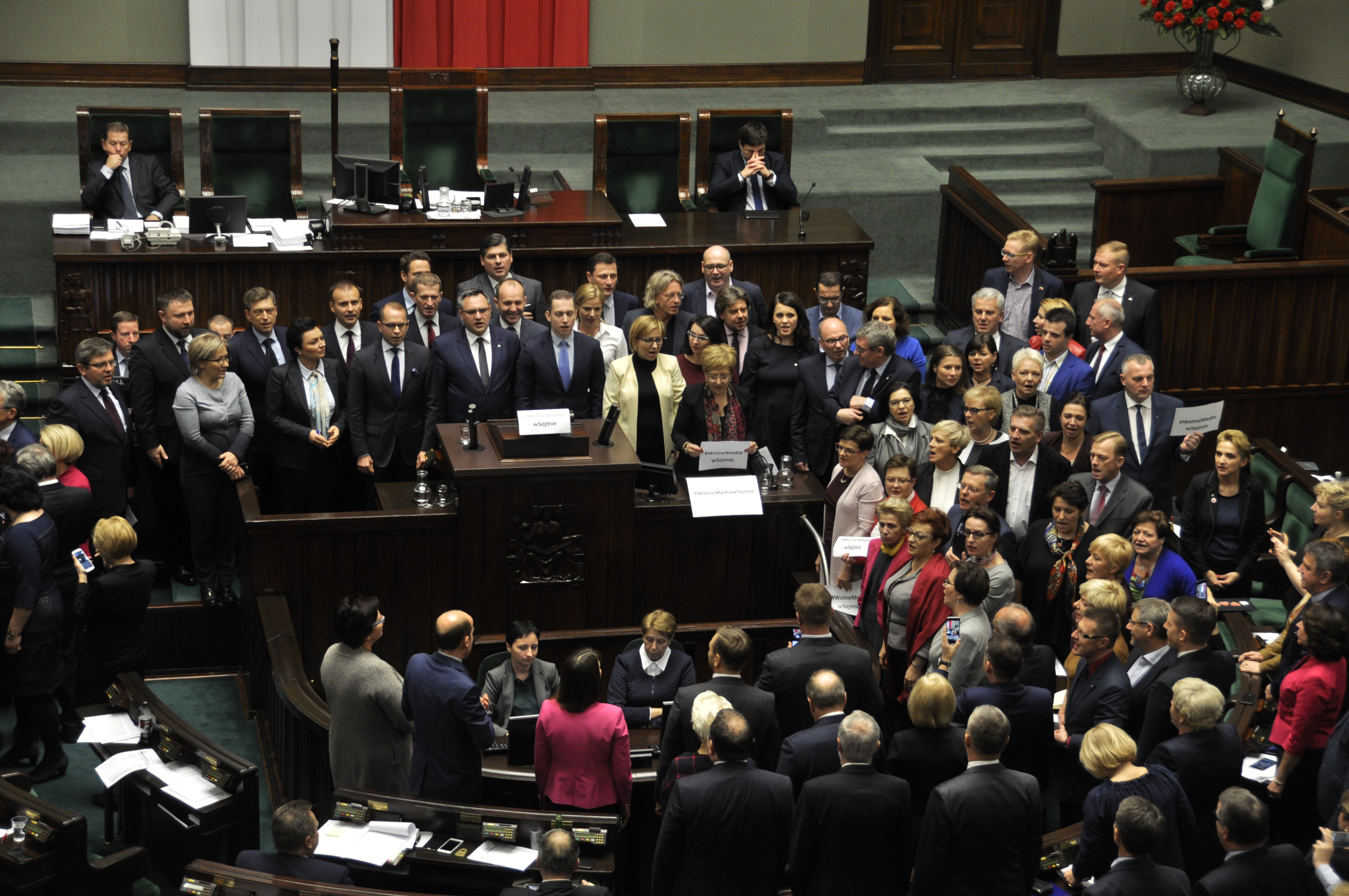
Opposition MPs protesting against limits on press freedom

In 2016, the government passed legislation which only allowed a small number of journalists and TV stations to report from parliament. This was seen as a continuation of PiS anti-journalistic policy, and resulted in protests. Inside the parliament building, opposition MPs staged a sit-in, forcing government legislators to pass bills elsewhere, and protestors outside the building gathered, shouting "freedom, equality, democracy".

=== 2017 Supreme Court crisis ===
In 2017 the Sejm and Senate passed a law mandating retirement for all judges aged over 70, unless given an exemption by the Minister of Justice. Following widespread protests this law was vetoed by Duda. A revised bill, mandating retirement at the age of 65, was eventually passed and signed by Duda, giving significant control to the government over judges and their livelihoods. In December 2017, the European Commission warned that "over a period of two years the Polish authorities have adopted more than 13 laws affecting the entire structure of the justice system in Poland", stating that "Article 7(1) of the Treaty on European Union provides for the Council, acting by a majority of four fifths of its members, to determine that there is a clear risk of a serious breach by a Member State of the common values referred to in Article 2 of the Treaty ... The Commission can trigger this process by a reasoned proposal." In December 2018, a new law was signed by Duda, reinstating all judges who had been removed from their posts by the 2017 law; despite this, concerns in the European Union remained. In April 2020, the ECJ ruled that Poland had still "failed to fulfil its obligations" under the Treaties of the European Union.

=== Deforestation ===
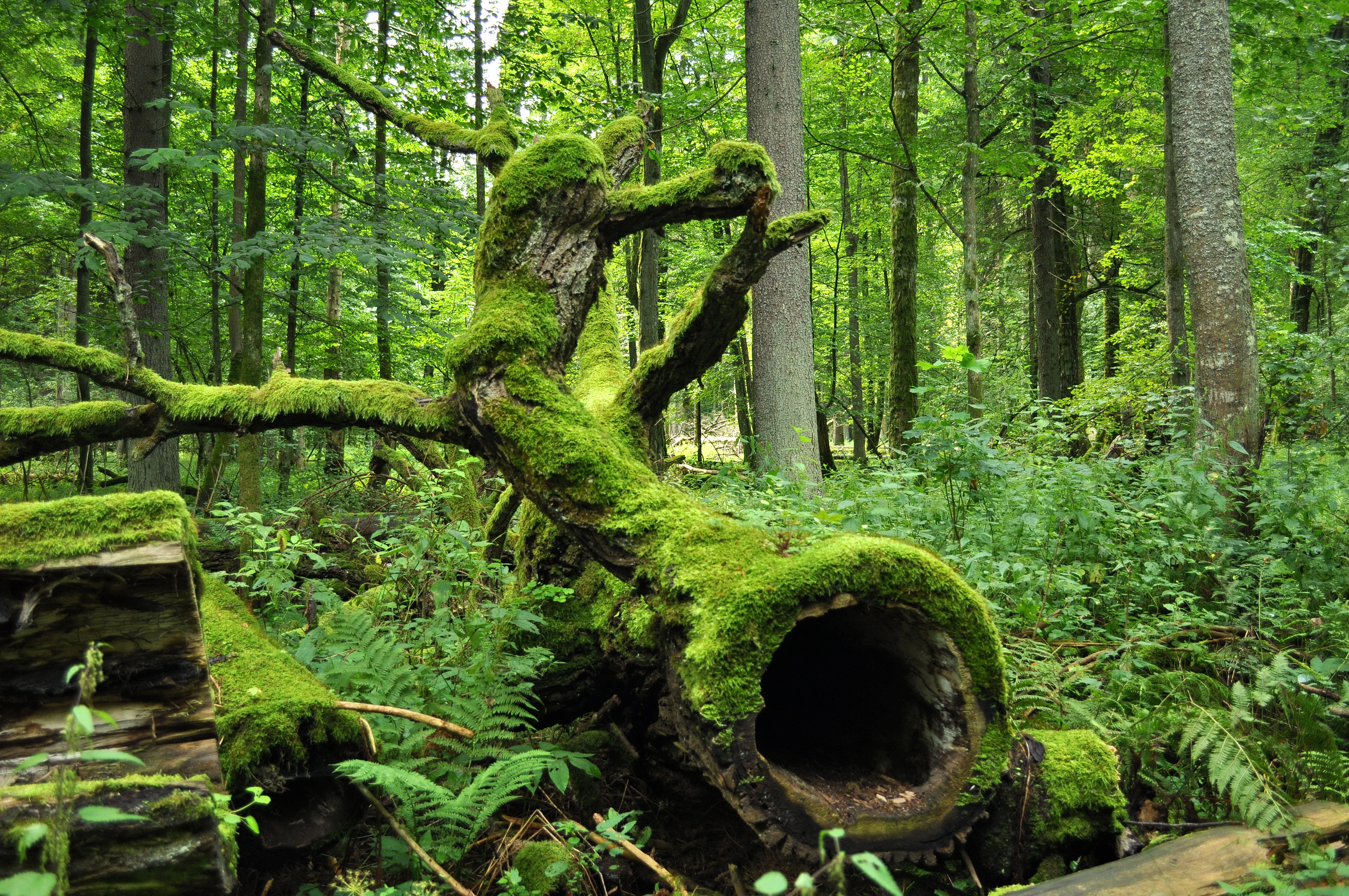
A fallen tree in Białowieża Forest

Białowieża Forest, an ancient woodland and World Heritage Site, has been subjected to large-scale logging since 2017. 190,000 cubic metres (160,000–180,000 trees) of wood were felled in 2017 alone. The European Commission sued Poland at the European Court of Justice, which ruled that logging must be immediately halted as Poland had failed to fulfil its obligations under the Habitats Directive and the Birds Directive, and threatened to fine the Polish state. UNESCO also requested that the Polish government halt logging in the area. Despite this, the Polish government has continued to allow logging in Białowieża Forest, although at "lower intensity" according to Greenpeace Poland, under the pretext of a bark beetle infestation, a pretext which has been twice rejected by the ECJ.

Several years later, it turned out that the bark beetle infestation got out of control, causing many more trees to die than would have been necessary, if the infestation had been controlled, by removing all infested and dead trees. Additionally, bordering private forests were lost to the infestation. The owners sued the government for not containing the infestation in time, claiming that the damage could have been prevented, had the expertise of their rangers and forest officials not been overruled by activists and foreign political entities.

=== LGBT-free zones ===
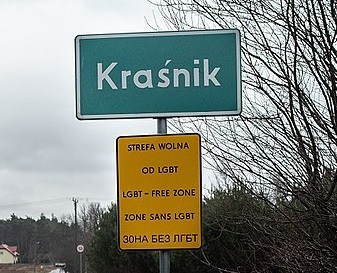
Illegally mounted street sign that created the confusion around the "LGBT Free Zones" and made the story go viral

In 2019 and 2020, LGBT-free zones were declared across many local authorities in Poland, with over 100 municipalities voting to declare themselves "LGBT-free", meaning free of the popular ideology in their public education programs. Whilst without legal backing, such declarations were found by the European Commissioner for Human Rights as "stigmatisation" which "directly impact" LGBT citizens, contrary to the European Convention on Human Rights and likely prohibited by Article 34 of the Constitution of Poland. The European Union broadly denounced these declarations, with the European Parliament voting overwhelming to condemn such declarations. An LGBT activist placed "LGBT-Free Zone" road signs in front of the towns, creating the impression that they were officially placed by the towns and photographed them. These pictures were then used by media outlets all around the world. The misleading presentation made the story go viral, so the young activist's success was recognized by a Obama foundation scholarship.

Polish opposition politicians, such as Robert Biedroń, have compared the declaration to the judenfrei zones created by the Nazis in Poland. Due to the breach of Article 2 of the Maastricht Treaty, the European Union's Structural Funds and Cohesion Fund can no longer be used in these areas; however, the Polish government pledged to fill the gap in funding to affected areas, in opposition to the EU but supported by the Catholic Church. President Ursula von der Leyen said "LGBTQI-free zones are humanity free zones. And they have no place in our Union" during her State of the Union speech in September 2020, indicating the strength of opposition in the European Union.

=== 2019 Supreme Court Disciplinary Chamber law ===
On 20 December 2019 the Sejm voted in favour of a new law, of which one effect was creating a Supreme Court Disciplinary Chamber to remove judges deemed to be partaking in "political activity". This gave the government de facto control of entire judicial arm of the state. The law also gave government greater control over appointment to the position of head judge of the Supreme Court. The law was criticised by the UN Human Rights Commission which stated the law "risks further undermining" the Polish judiciary. The European Union criticised the bill, with Poland risking further sanctions under Article 7 and by the European Court of Justice. The EU urged Poland not to pass the bill, and to consult the Venice Commission, yet it passed. The Association of Judges of Ireland condemned the Polish legislation. Koen Lenaerts, President of the Court of Justice of the European Union, warned that "You can't be a member of the European Union if you don't have independent, impartial courts operating in accordance with fair trial rule, upholding union law".

The Polish Supreme Court stated that the bill was a "continuation of the lawlessness of the 1980s". According to the court: "Everything is there: a ban on the freedom of speech by judges, the establishment of a surveillance mechanism and a drastic reduction of their right to have profiles on social networks". The Polish Supreme Court, prior to the bill passing, said that Poland overruling the primacy of EU law may force it out of the bloc. Donald Tusk, former European Council president, warned the bill might force Poland out of the EU. Ombudsman Adam Bodnar said the law "violates the Constitution and the ground rules of the rule of law" and "would definitively put Polish courts and judges under the control of the legislative and executive branches of government". Special Rapporteur of the United Nations on the Independence of Judges and Lawyers Diego García Sayán and President of the European Association of Judges José Igreja Matos warned the legislation "runs contrary to judicial independence".

The Disciplinary Chamber created in the 2019 law was found to be illegitimate by the European Court of Human Rights in 2021 due to executive and legislative interference. It was replaced by a new chamber, the Professional Responsibility Chamber (Polish: Izba Odpowiedzialności Zawodowej), under a law of June 2022.

=== COVID-19 reporting ===
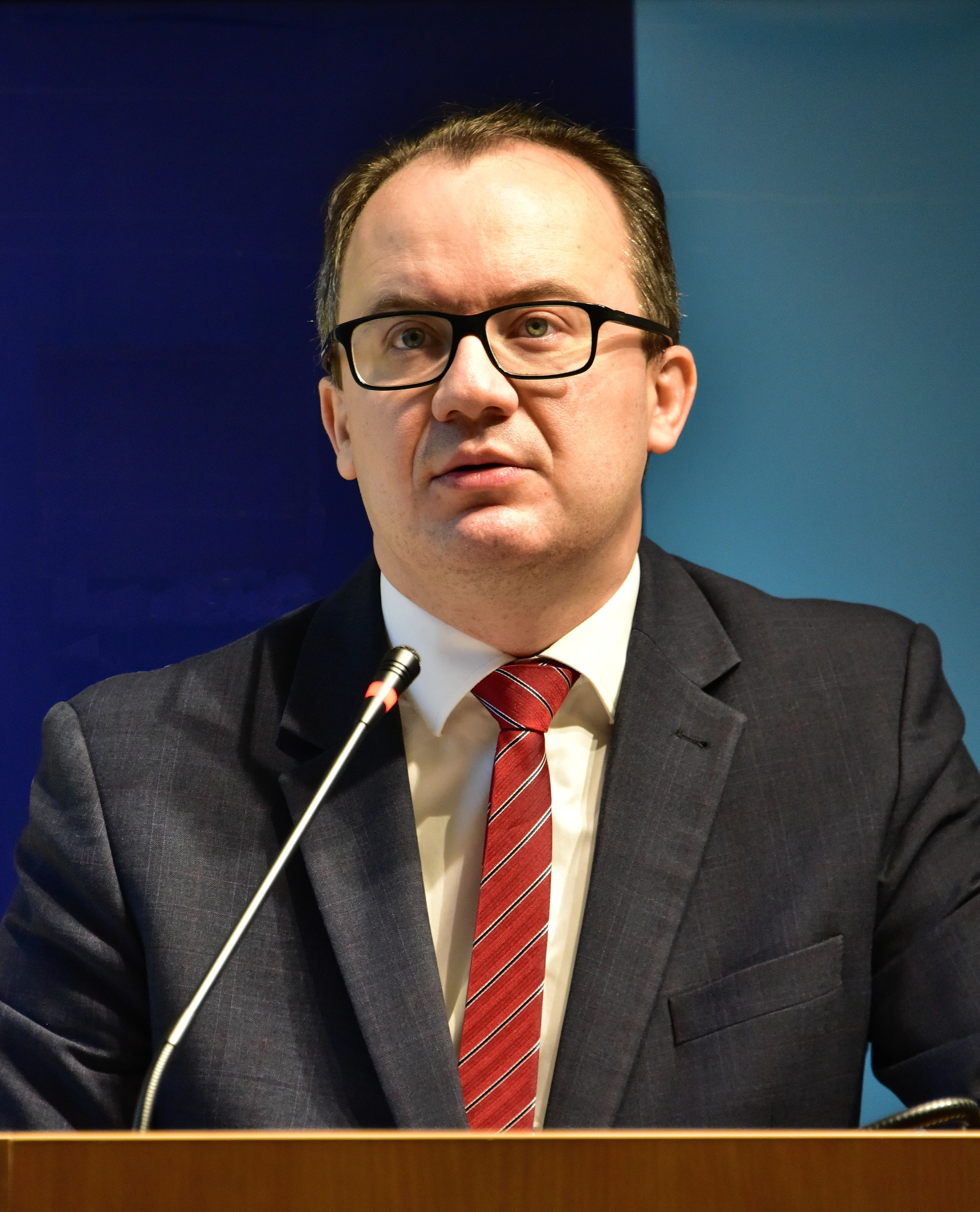
Adam Bodnar, Polish Ombudsman since 2015, is responsible for defending human rights in Poland and has criticised the Polish government throughout this crisis.

On 20 March 2020, the secretary of state of the Ministry of Health, Józefa Szczurek-Żelazko, sent a written statement ordering voivodeship medical consultants to not make statements about SARS-CoV-2, the epidemiological situation, the risks for medical staff or methods of protection from infection, unless they had first consulted with the Ministry of Health or Główny Inspektorat Sanitarny. Szczurek-Żelazko motivated the order by the need to provide correct, unified information and to avoid unjustified unrest in the medical community.

A surgeons' group, Porozumienie Chirurgów SKALPEL, described the order as blackmail and said that it risked catastrophe. The group stated that the COVID-19 pandemic showed Poland as "not at all prepared for crisis situations" with a "lack of equipment, basic personal protective gear and disinfectant materials and a lack of standards and procedures". On 25 March 2020, the Polish Ombudsman Adam Bodnar sent a letter to the Minister of Health, Szumowski, stating that medical staff's freedom of speech and is guaranteed under Articles 2 and 54 of the Polish Constitution and the right of the public to information is guaranteed under Article 61 of the constitution. Bodnar stated that firing or punishing doctors for informing the public during the pandemic could be a violation of the "obligatory standards". Bodnar asked if Szumowski was aware of the situation and requested a clarification of policy.

=== 2019–2020 elections ===
2020 Polish presidential election

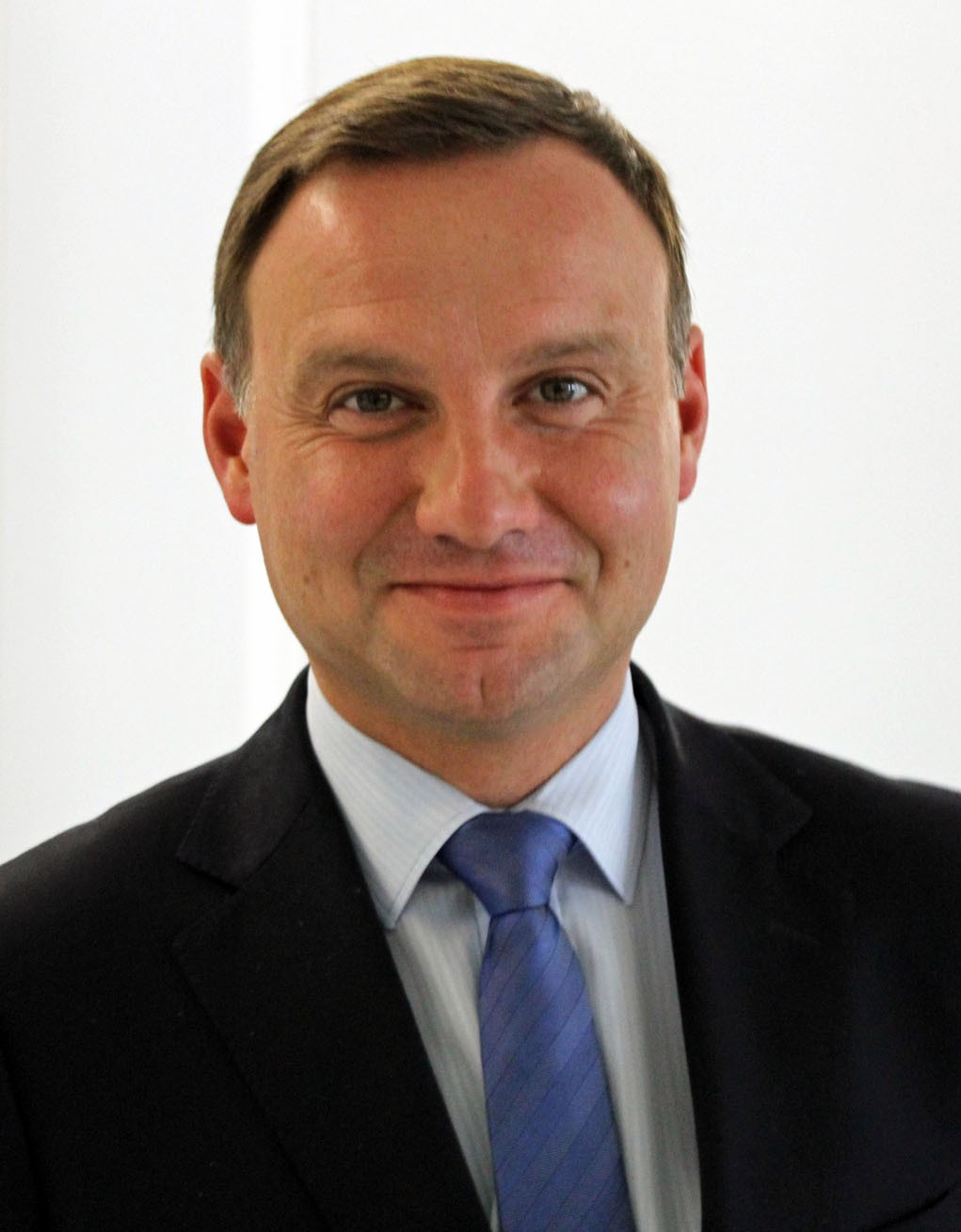
Andrzej Duda, endorsed by Law and Justice (PiS)

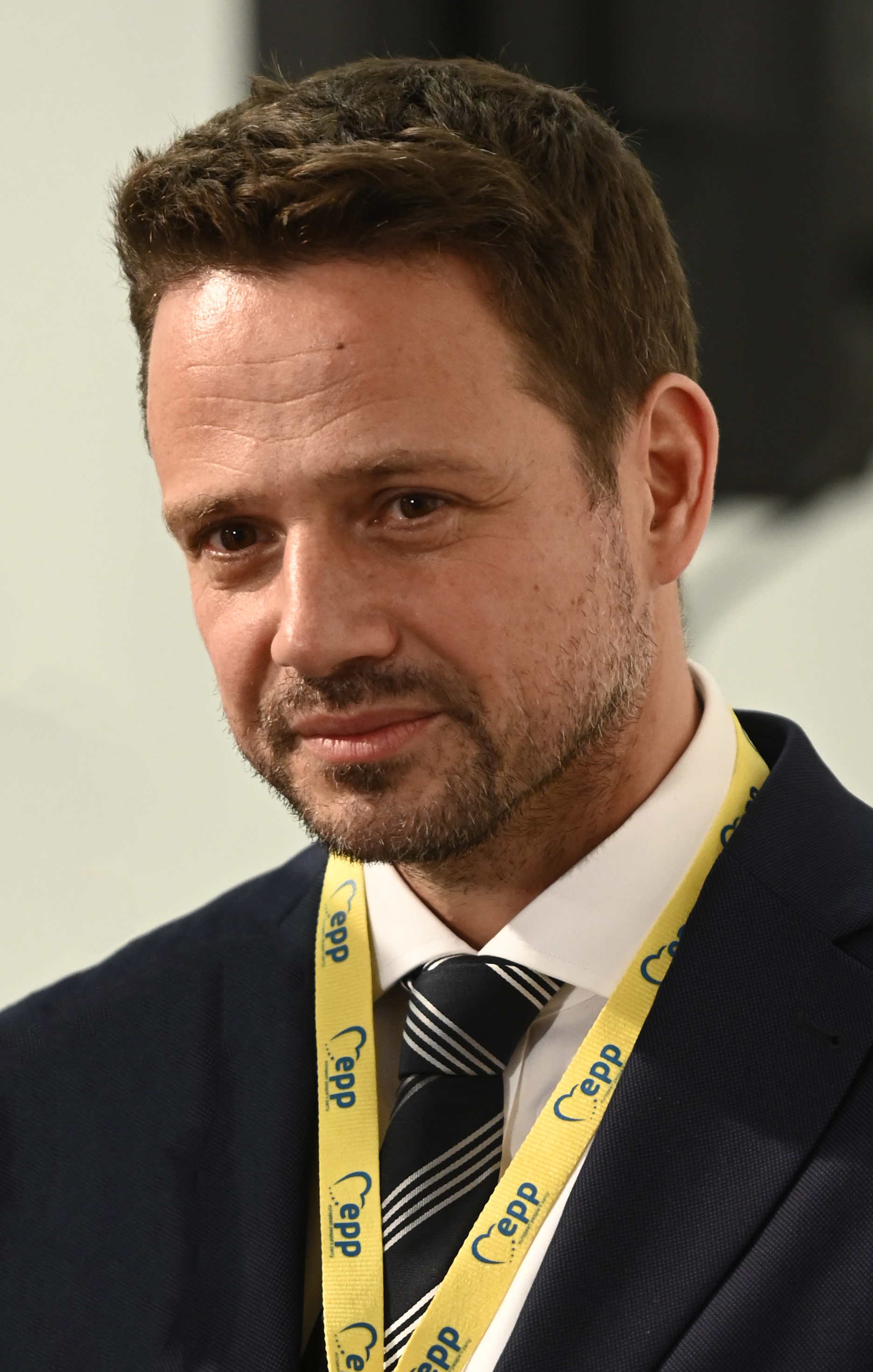
Rafał Trzaskowski, Civic Platform (KO)

In 2019 and 2020, PiS and the United Right retained control of the parliament and presidency of Poland. In the 2019 Polish parliamentary election, which had the highest turnout since the fall of Communism in Poland, PiS retained 43.59% of the popular vote for the Sejm and 44.56% of the vote for the Senate, marking a positive swing in these elections. In 2020, the 2020 Polish presidential election took place, with Duda winning with 51.03% of the vote. Independent observers from the Organization for Security and Co-operation in Europe found that Telewizja Polska, the Polish public broadcasting service, was inappropriately and "clearly biased" towards Duda and PiS in both elections.

== Second Duda term (2020–2025) ==
=== LGBT rights ===
In August 2020, following the arrest of Margot, an LGBT activist, several mass demonstrations took place across Poland. In central Warsaw, this protest degenerated and led to a violent police response, in turn resulting in further protest action. These protested against the "LGBT-free zones", police violence and human rights rollbacks by the government. It has been described by some media outlets as "Poland's Stonewall". In January 2021, the trial of three Polish activists began, charged with offending religious feelings after creating and posting posters of the Black Madonna of Częstochowa with the rainbow flag, popularly known as the Rainbow Madonna.

=== Abortion rights ===
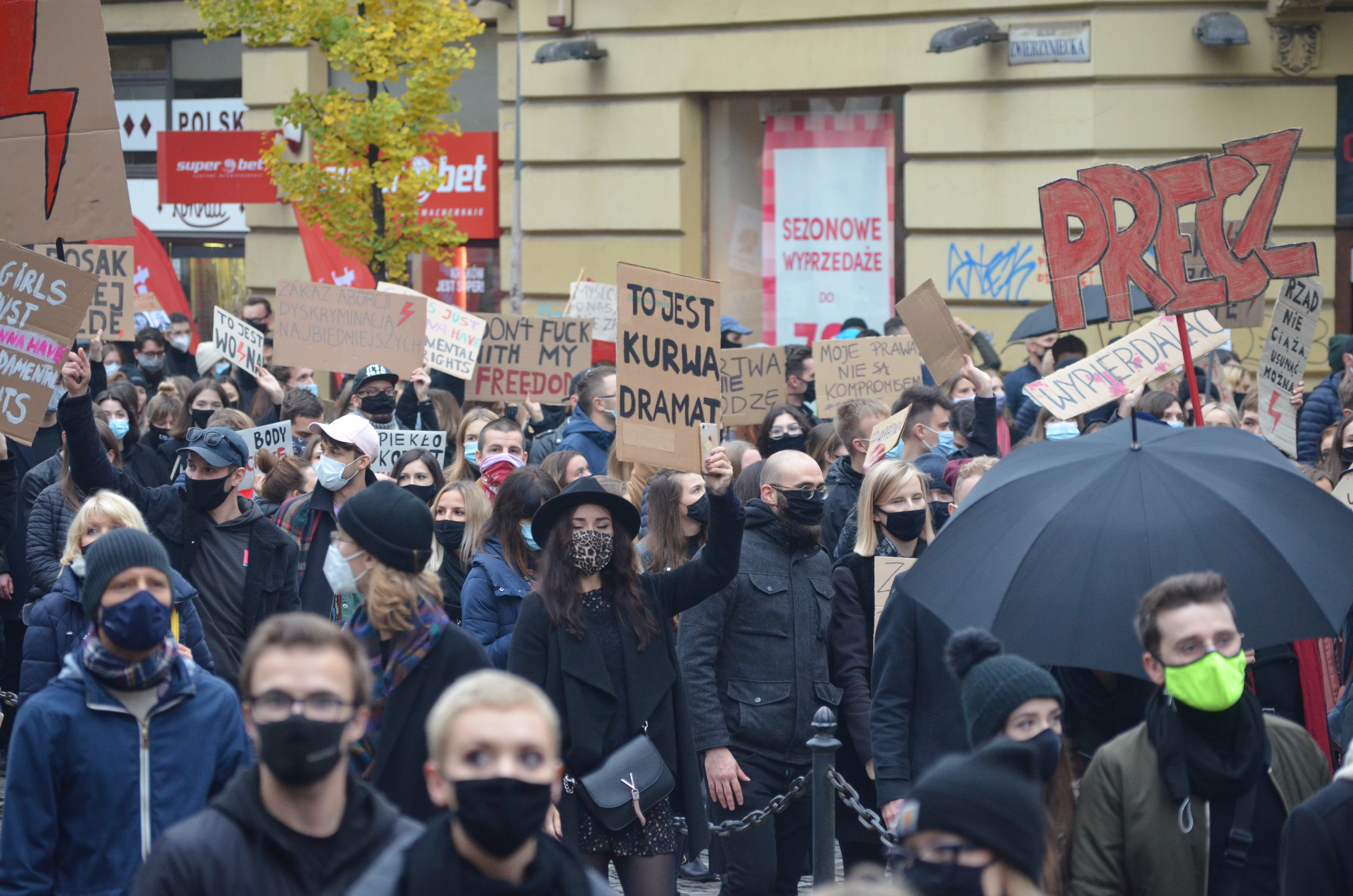
October 2020 protests against abortion restrictions in Kraków, Poland

On 22 October 2020, the Constitutional Tribunal, with disputed judges, ruled that abortion in cases of disability or life-limiting illness were unconstitutional, further limiting abortion rights in Poland. The decision was nearly unanimous, with judges ruling 11–2 in favour of limiting abortion. The court found it violated the right to human dignity enshrined in the Polish constitution. This precipitated significant protests and civil unrest. Protests began on the day of the ruling, but have continued, especially in major cities such as Warsaw, which saw a protest on 30 October by an estimated 100,000 people. Protests continued throughout November and December 2020. On 27 January 2021, the ruling was formally published in Dziennik Ustaw and enforcement of the ruling began across Poland, precipitating further waves of unrest. Poland now has one of the most restrictive abortion laws in Europe; the BBC described it as a "near-total ban", for 98% of previous abortions in Poland took place under the laws now deemed unconstitutional.

== Third Cabinet of Donald Tusk ==
In 2023, the Civic Coalition, a coalition led by Donald Tusk, won the 2023 Polish parliamentary election, and the Tusk government began a series of measures to roll back Duda's reforms and to restore the rule of law to Poland, opposed by Duda, who remained President. In January 2024, two members of parliament whose conviction was disputed on the basis of disputed presidential pardons were arrested in the Polish presidential palace, where Duda had given them refuge. In March 2024, the Sejm voted on a non-binding resolution that declared the 2015 nomination of several of the Constitutional Tribunal justices were invalid. The resolution also stated that the President of the Constitutional Tribunal, Julia Przyłębska, was invalidly appointed.

The Tusk government further contributed to the rule of law crisis: in August 2026, the government coalition under Tusk appointed its minister, Maciej Berek, to the Constitutional Tribunal, causing several foundations to protest the nomination. An SW Research poll for Rzeczpospolita found that 59.7% of Poles believed the nomination ran against judicial independence and contributed to the politicization of the judiciary, while only 16.3% believed otherwise.

In October 2026, the dispute continued with the suspension of Bogdan Święczkowski, the president of the Polish Constitutional Tribunal, who had been appointed by the previous PiS government.

== Opposition groups ==
=== Domestic ===
==== Parliamentary parties ====
- Civic Coalition, the main opposition
- The Left, political alliance of left-wing parties

==== Other ====
- All-Poland Women's Strike, social movement for women's rights
  - Consultative Council, strategy council for the All-Poland Women's Strike
- Campaign Against Homophobia, gay rights organisation
- Citizens of Poland, pro-democracy civic movement
- Committee for the Defence of Democracy, NGO promoting "European values"
- Polish Judges Association

=== International ===
- Amnesty International
- European Union
- Greenpeace
- Helsinki Foundation for Human Rights
- Women on Web

== Role of the European Union ==
Under European Union law, the European Court of Justice may declare that member state law is incompatible with Treaties of the European Union, or disregard it as concerning one of the shared competences. Examples of the former include judicial independence, human rights (including women's rights and LGBT rights) and freedom of the press. Thus, several times from 2016 to 2020, the European Commission referred to a lack of rule of law in Poland, as Union law was not being applied.

Article 7 of the Treaty on European Union allows the Union to suspend the rights of membership if a nation breaches the vaguely formulated Article 2, namely "respect for human dignity, freedom, democracy, equality, the rule of law and respect for human rights, including the rights of persons belonging to minorities". This would be subject to a veto by any other member state, with Hungary indicating it would veto such action. Despite this, attempts were made to introduce sanctions or make funding conditional on the rule-of-law, such as in the Next Generation EU budget, Structural Funds and Cohesion Fund.

== See also ==
- Poland in the European Union
- Polexit – Proposal for Poland to leave the EU
- Anti-LGBT rhetoric – Themes, catchphrases, and slogans used to demean LGBTQ people
- Democratic backsliding – Drift towards authoritarianism
- European Charter of Fundamental Rights – Group of rights of the European Union
  - European Court of Justice – Supreme court in the European Union, part of the Court of Justice of the European Union
- European Convention on Human Rights – International treaty in Europe
  - European Court of Human Rights – Supranational court of the Council of Europe
- Commissioner for Human Rights (Poland) – Ombudsman of Poland
