= Germany–Poland relations =

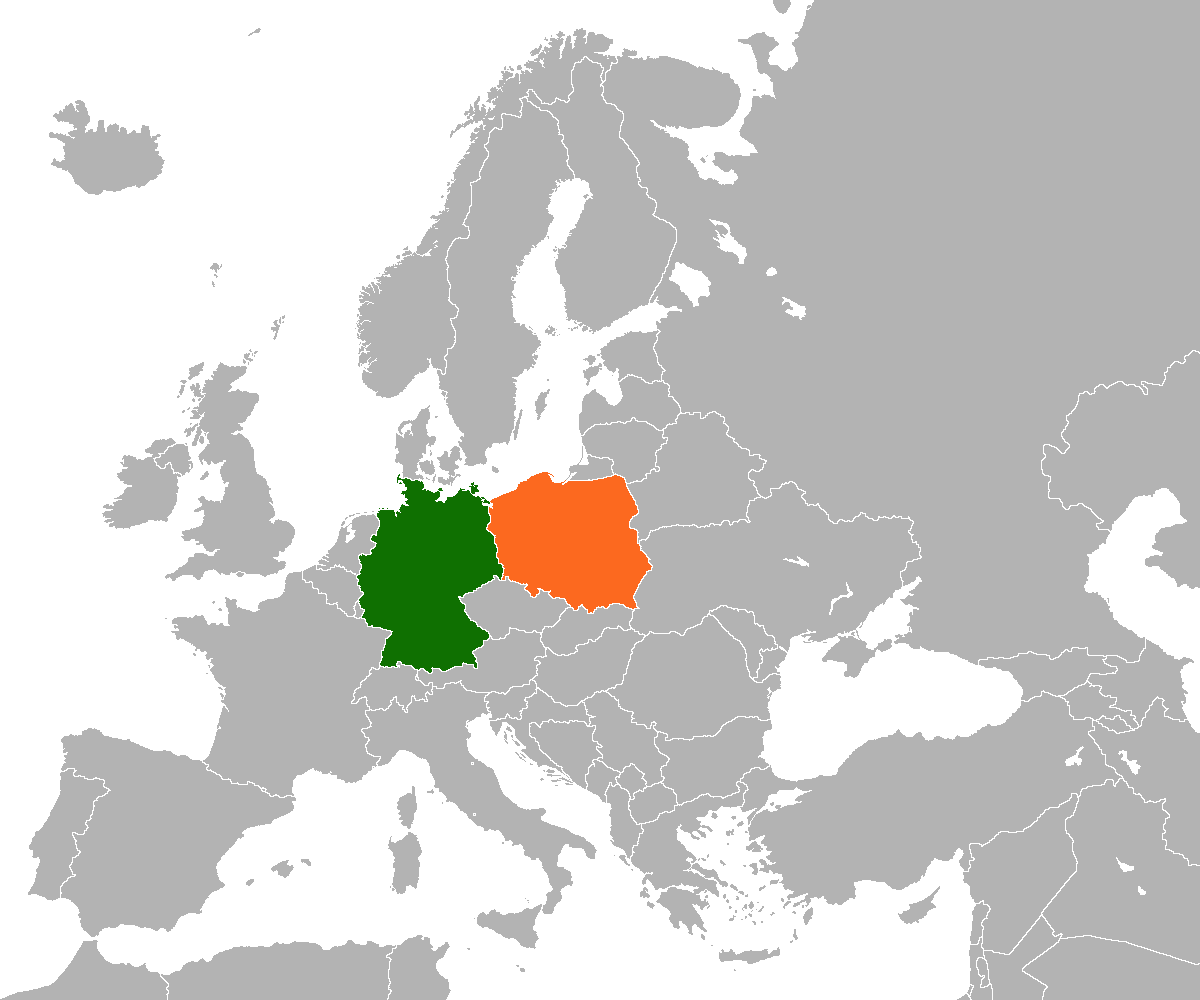

- Germany: Poland

The bilateral relations between Poland and Germany have been marked by an extensive and complicated history. Currently, the relations between the two countries are very friendly, with the two being allies within NATO and the European Union.

From the 10th century onward, the Piast-ruled Kingdom of Poland established under Duke Mieszko I had close and chequered relations with the Holy Roman Empire. However, these relations were overshadowed in the Late Middle Ages both by the push eastwards of the Margraviate of Brandenburg into Polish territory and the centuries-long Polish–Teutonic Wars, as a result of which the State of the Teutonic Order became a fief of the Kingdom of Poland, later transformed with the consent of the Polish King into the secular Duchy of Prussia. Prussia retained a certain level of autonomy under Polish rule. Later, the Kingdom of Prussia rose and eventually became one of the three partitioners of Poland in 1772–1795. Following the partitions various anti-Polish policies were pursued, including the Kulturkampf, Germanization and expulsions of Poles. That period was also marked by several Polish uprisings against Prussian rule, including the Greater Poland uprising of 1848 during the European Revolutions of 1848.

After World War I, in 1918, Poland regained independence and its place on the map. Under the Treaty of Versailles, Poland regained most of the territories lost to Prussia in the Partitions of Poland and parts of territories lost even earlier, while Gdańsk (Danzig) became a free city in customs union with Poland. It was seen as a great injustice in the Weimar Republic, in part leading to the Nazi takeover of power in 1933. On 1 September 1939, Poland was invaded by Germany, thus initiating World War II. The Third Reich established concentration camps in German-occupied Poland, the biggest located in Auschwitz. During the war, Poland suffered circa 6 million casualties and it also suffered huge material losses because Germany sought to commit genocide against its Polish, Jewish and Roma populations. As a result of World War II and the decision of the Big Three, Poland lost the eastern half of its territory, which was annexed by the Soviet Union, and as compensation for this loss, it received most of the pre-war eastern territories of Germany. From 1945–1950, a series of flights and expulsions occurred, in which up to 11 million ethnic Germans were forced to leave their homes in Poland and resettle in post-war West and East Germany. It was the largest forced displacement of a population in history.

The Cold War saw good relations between the communist states of the Polish People's Republic and the German Democratic Republic. Polish-West German relations, on the other hand, were strained, although they improved after Chancellor Willy Brandt launched the Ostpolitik. In 1990, Germany reunified and it confirmed the Polish-German border on the Oder-Neisse line in a treaty. Both states are now NATO and the European Union allies and partners, having an open border and being members of the European Single Market. Both countries are also members of the OECD, OSCE, the Council of Europe, the Council of the Baltic Sea States, HELCOM and the World Trade Organization. The once poor relationship between Poland and Germany has now become a strategic partnership.

== Overview ==
=== Middle Ages ===
Poland in 996 under the rule of Mieszko I, whose acceptance of Christianity and the Baptism of Poland marked the beginning of statehood in 966.

In the 10th century, the West Slavic Polan tribe under the Piast prince Mieszko I about 960 were able to consolidate Lechitic tribes and establish a sovereign state around Poznań and Gniezno in an area later called Greater Poland. Mieszko's territory included Masovia beyond the Vistula river, Silesia and in 962/63 he first met with the Saxon forces of Margrave Gero, ruler of the Marca Geronis between the Saale and Bóbr rivers established in 937 by King Otto I of Germany. During the fight with Germanic duchies Mieszko I in 963 recognized Otto I as Emperor In return for tribute to the newly crowned Emperor, Otto I recognized Mieszko I as amicus imperatoris ("Friend of the Emperor") and stated that he is dux Poloniae ("Duke of Poland"). As he could not prevail against Gero, Mieszko I resorted to consolidate his realm: he strengthened the relations with the Bohemian duke Boleslaus I by marrying his daughter Dobrawa and converted to Christianity in 966. The next year however, he once again entangled with the troops of the Saxon renegade Wichmann the Younger, fighting over the island of Wolin on the Baltic coast. He also had to defend the Polish border on the lower Oder river against the forces of Margrave Odo I of Lusatia at the 972 Battle of Cedynia.

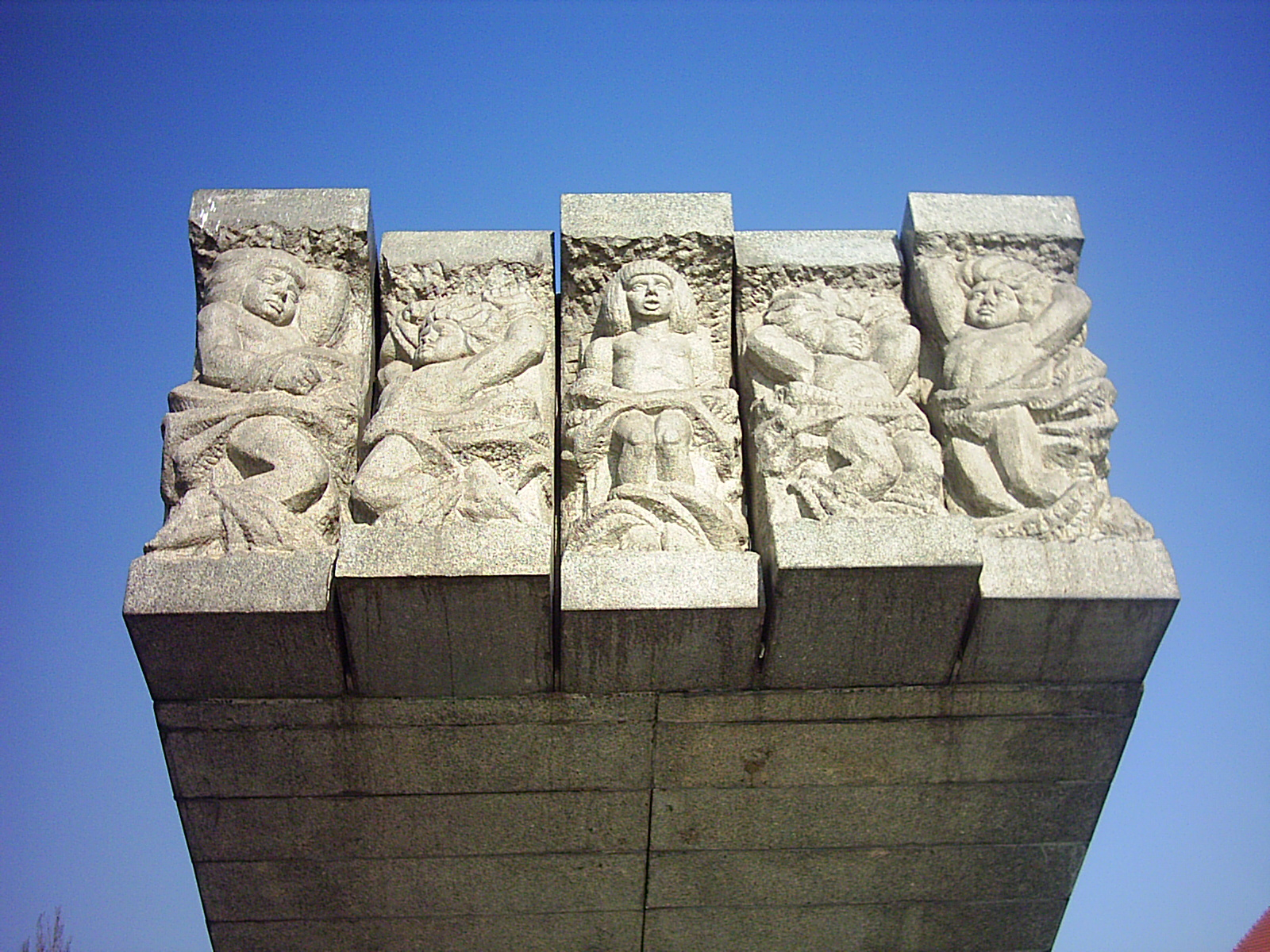
Children of Głogów Monument in Głogów, commemorating the successful Polish Defense of Głogów during the German invasion of 1109

Meanwhile, Poland had to face the claims to universal power raised by Otto I when he had conquered the Kingdom of Italy and was crowned Holy Roman Emperor by Pope John XII in 962. According to the idea of the translatio imperii, the Emperor would continue the tradition of the Roman and Carolingian Empire as guardian of the Catholic Church superior to all secular and ecclesiastical rulers. Mieszko sought to improve the relations with Otto I: he appeared as amicus imperatoris at the Imperial Diet of Quedlinburg in 973 and in 978 secondly married Oda, the daughter of Dietrich of Haldensleben, margrave of the Northern March. In 984 Mieszko's son Bolesław I the Brave was married to a daughter of Margrave Rikdag of Meissen. However, in the same year the Polish ruler, instigated by Duke Boleslaus II of Bohemia, interfered in the conflict between minor King Otto III of Germany and the deposed Bavarian duke Henry the Wrangler. He timely switched sides, when he realized that Otto's mother Theophanu would gain the upper hand and in turn sparked a long-term conflict with the Bohemian dukes over Silesia and Lesser Poland. Mieszko backed the German forces several times against the revolting Lutici (Veleti) tribes (though to no avail) and until his death in 992 remained a loyal supporter of the Emperor. Nevertheless, Mieszko precautionally had the Dagome iudex document drawn up, whereby he put his realm called Civitas Schinesghe under the auspices of the Holy See.

A major German–Polish War was fought between 1003 and 1018. In 1109, Poland defeated the invading German forces at Głogów.

Throughout the Middle Ages, the Germans expanded eastwards from modern western and central Germany into the less populated regions, east of Elbe and Saale rivers, which were inhabited by Baltic, Finnic and Slavic peoples, including Poles. The area of German settlement roughly stretched from Slovenia to Estonia, and southwards into Transylvania. The phenomenon, known as Ostsiedlung ("east settlement", "settlement in the east") followed the territorial expansion of the Holy Roman Empire and the Teutonic Order. At various times, Germans were also encouraged by Polish rulers of the Piast dynasty to settle in Poland. Ethnic conflicts erupted between the newly arrived settlers and local populations.

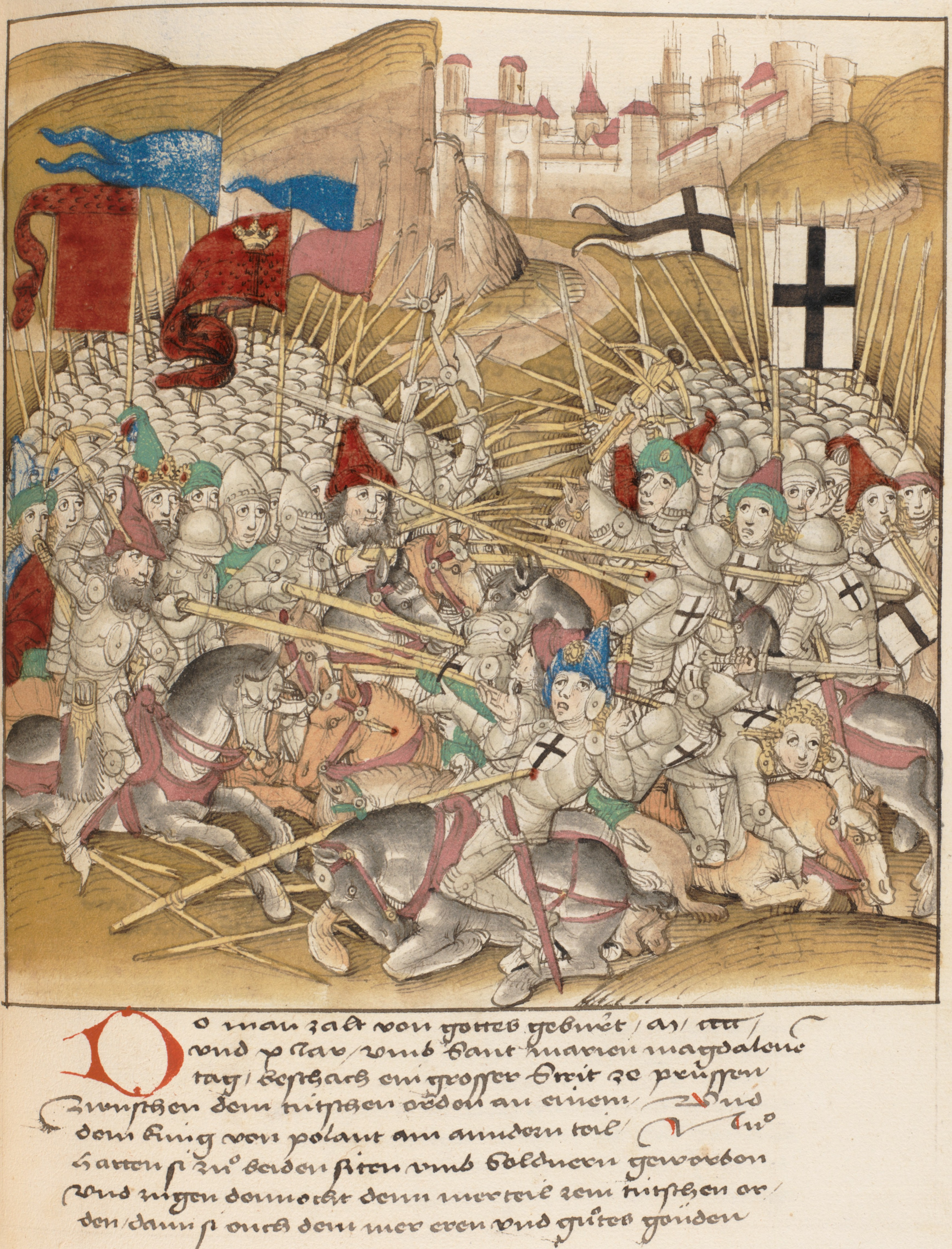
The Battle of Grunwald resulted in a victory of the Kingdom of Poland against the Teutonic Knights, 15 July 1410.

In the 13th century, Poland was suffering from the attacks of Baltic Pagan tribes. In response, Konrad I of Masovia hired an army of unemployed German crusaders - the Teutonic Order. After the failure of converting the Old Prussians to Christianity, the Order fell into a series of conflicts with the Polish state. The Teutonic Knights invaded the Polish coastal region of Gdańsk Pomerania with the country's main port city of Gdańsk, and therefore took the control of the nearly entire southeastern Baltic Sea coast. The Teutonic Knights continued to occupy the region despite papal verdicts. They remained powerful until 1410, when a combined Polish-Lithuanian army was able to win a decisive victory over the Teutonic Order at Grunwald. As a result, Poland emerged as a major power in Central Europe. Already in the 15th century, German theologian and writer John of Falkenberg proposed and advocated the genocide of Poles. After the Battle of Grunwald, he suggested that the Polish nation, including the King, should either be enslaved or exterminated, either in its entirety, or in its majority. After Poland challenged his works at the Council of Constance, his views were condemned by Pope Martin V in 1424. He is considered the first writer to formulate the argument in justification of genocide of another nation. After the Thirteen Years' War (1454–1466), Poland regained the territories previously annexed by the Teutonic Knights. The remainder of the State of the Teutonic Order became a vassal state of Poland.

Poland and Bavaria enjoyed good relations since the late Middle Ages, and several Bavarian dukes and electors married Polish princesses, including George marrying Hedwig Jagiellon (daughter of King Casimir IV Jagiellon), Maximilian II Emanuel marrying Theresa Kunegunda Sobieska (daughter of King John III Sobieski), and Maximilian III Joseph marrying Maria Anna Sophia (daughter of King Augustus III of Poland). The wedding of George and Hedwig is commemorated by a historic pageant held every four years known as the Landshut Wedding.

=== Modern Age ===
In the 16th century, after the Counter-Reformation was launched and the Thirty Years War broke out in the German lands, Poland became a Roman Catholic stronghold. In 1683, the Polish army commanded by Polish king John III Sobieski helped to relieve the siege of Vienna and along with the Holy Roman Empire, ended the growing expansion of the Ottoman Empire into Europe.

Allegory of the 1st partition of Poland, showing Catherine the Great of Russia (left), Joseph II of Austria and Frederick the Great of Prussia (right) quarrelling over their territorial seizures

In the second half of the 18th century, the Polish–Lithuanian Commonwealth was partitioned three times between Prussia, Russia and the Austria. The partitions took place in 1772, 1793 and 1795. During the Napoleonic Wars, the Poles fought alongside France against Prussia, including in the victorious Greater Poland uprising of 1806, and the short-lived Polish Duchy of Warsaw was a part of a larger French-led alliance with the German states of the Confederation of the Rhine, however, following the War of the Sixth Coalition the Duchy of Warsaw was dissolved, and partially re-annexed by Prussia.

Under Prussian rule in areas where the Polish population lived alongside Germans a virtual apartheid existed, with bans on the Polish language and religious discrimination, besides attempts to colonize the areas with Germans. Germanisation policies were pursued by Prussia and, since 1871, Germany.

The Polish November Uprising in the Russian Partition of Poland of 1830–31 triggered enthusiasm for the Polish cause among German liberals, mocked by conservatives as Polish gushing (Polenschwärmerei). These German liberals however felt that their political ideals for Germany corresponded to the Polish hopes. Throughout the German lands a network of organizations devoted to supporting the Poles appeared, and over 70 German doctors went to Poland to provide relief to Polish insurgents. The restoration of independent Poland was advocated at the Hambach Festival of 1832 with Poles in attendance. In 1832, Prussian soldiers committed massacres of interned Polish insurgents in Fiszewo and Elbląg, killing over a dozen people.

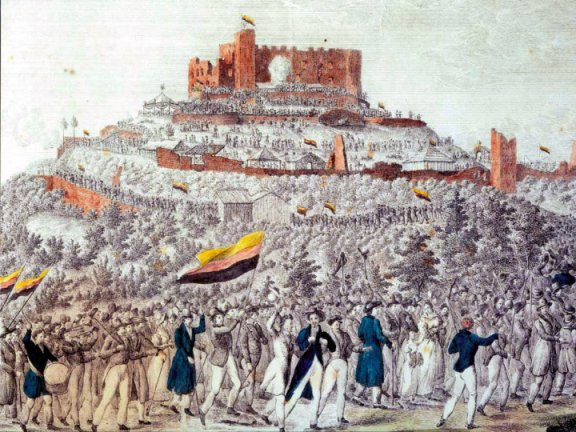
Participants at the Hambach Festival (1832), where German liberals and Polish exiles expressed their shared commitment to freedom, democracy, and national self-determination.

Several Polish uprisings broke out, with the largest one being the Greater Poland uprising of 1848. The antagonism between the Polish and German populations dates from the Revolutions of 1848, triggered both by the Poles' desire to regain their independence and the Germans' desire to incorporate the Prussian Partition of Poland into a planned German Reich. Prussian leader and founder of modern Germany, Otto von Bismarck, in regards to Poles, wrote: Hit the Poles so hard that they despair of their life; I have full sympathy with their condition, but if we want to survive, we can only exterminate them; the wolf, too, cannot help having been created by God as he is, but people shoot him for it if they can. In 1863, Prussian troops pacified a protest of the Polish population in the village of Bredynki, killing more than a dozen people, fearing the outbreak of a Polish uprising. Germany also carried out expulsions of Poles, and since the late 19th century, the Lebensraum concept was proliferated in Germany, and it also pertained to annexed ancient Polish territories.

Between 1870 and 1914, some 3.5 million Poles have emigrated to Germany, including 1.2 million in internal migration from Polish territories under German rule, 1.2 million from the Russian Partition of Poland and 1.1 million from the Austrian Partition of Poland, including 500,000 Poles migrating to work in the industrialized Ruhr region in western Germany and forming a vibrant Polish community known as the Ruhrpolen. The Ruhrpolen were also subjected to anti-Polish and Germanisation policies. Bernhard von Bülow, who served as Chancellor of Germany from 1900 to 1909, called the Polish victory over the Teutonic Knights at the Battle of Grunwald in 1410 the Germans' most portentous national disaster.

=== 20th and 21st century ===
Around 1900, the Polish national movement was organized in the Narodowa Demokracja. The geopolitical ideology of this movement was the Piast Concept, which viewed the German-Polish borderlands as the cradle of the Polish state. Its founder and principal ideologue Roman Dmowski even claimed the industrialized Prussian east as the bedrock of the Polish nation to regain independence.

==== First World War (1914–1918) ====
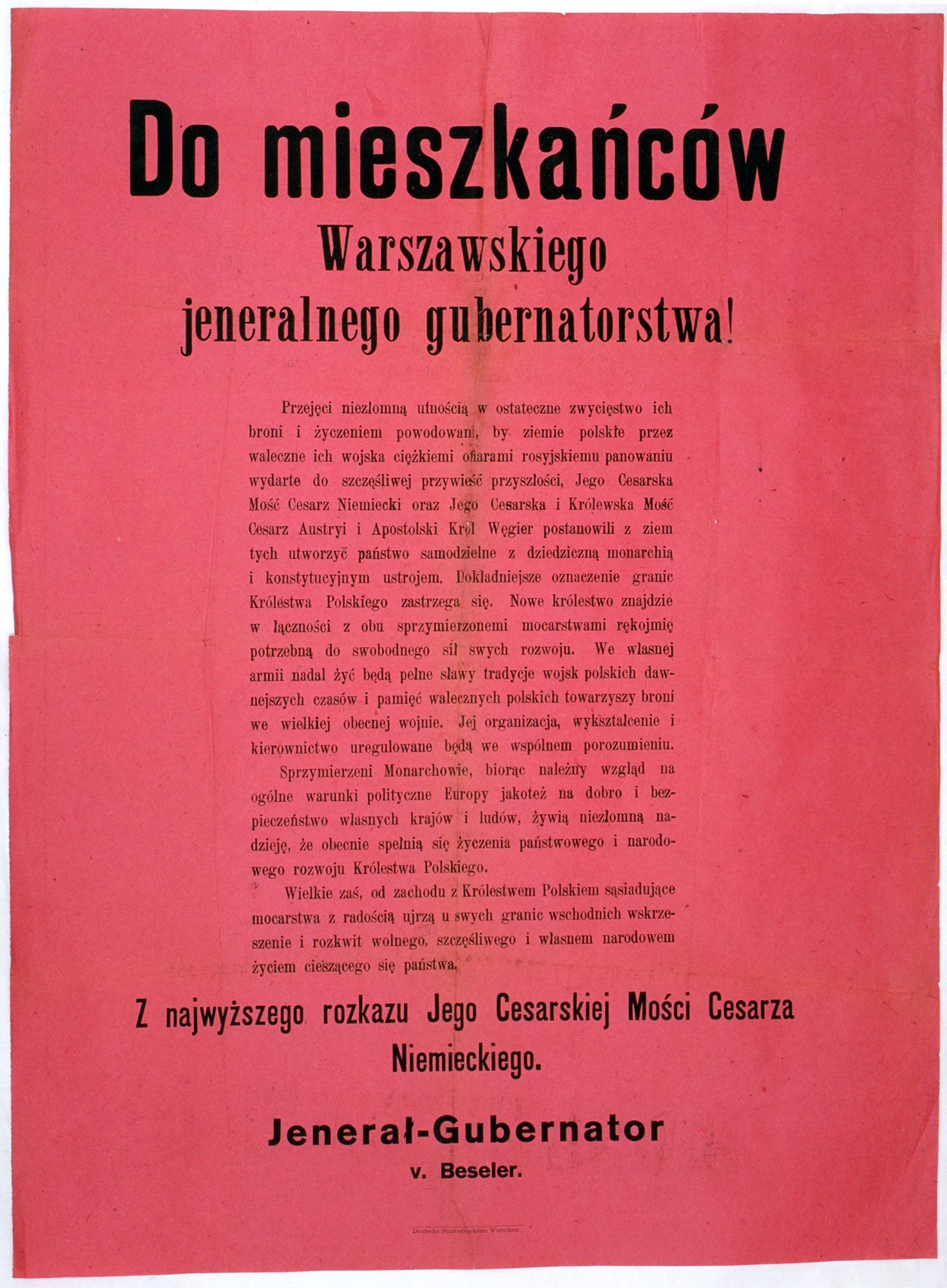
Act of 5th November of 1916

During World War I, Germany invaded and occupied vast areas of the Russian Partition of Poland, and in August 1914, the German Army carried out the destruction of Kalisz, one of Poland's oldest historical cities. During the war, the Polish Legions led by Józef Piłsudski initially fought on the side of Austria-Hungary and Germany against Russia, in hope of defeating at least one of the partitioning powers and restoring independent Poland at least in the former Russian Partition. Moreover, just before the outbreak of the war, some 40,000 Poles served in the Imperial German Army, and during the war the number of such conscripts rose to 850,000. Conscripted Poles were often sent to the Western Front and were killed in battles there, as Germany feared potential desertions by Poles fighting on Polish soil on the Eastern Front. Polish military units were also formed in Russia (Polish Armed Forces in the East) and France (Blue Army), enemies of Germany. Germany ran special prisoner-of-war camps for captured ethnic Poles from the Russian Army, with the aim of subjecting them to propaganda and conscripting them into a planned German-controlled Polish army to fight against Russia. Faced with the mass reluctance and distrust from the Polish POWs, the plan failed and was abandoned.

The 1914 Septemberprogramm authorized by German Chancellor Theobald von Bethmann Hollweg proposed the creation of a Central European Economic Union, comprising a number of European countries, including Germany and Poland, in which, as the Chancellor secretly stressed, there was to be a semblance of equality among the member states, but in fact it was to be under German leadership to stabilize Germany's economic predominance in Central Europe, with co-author Kurt Riezler admitting that the union would be a veiled form of German domination in Europe (see also: Mitteleuropa).

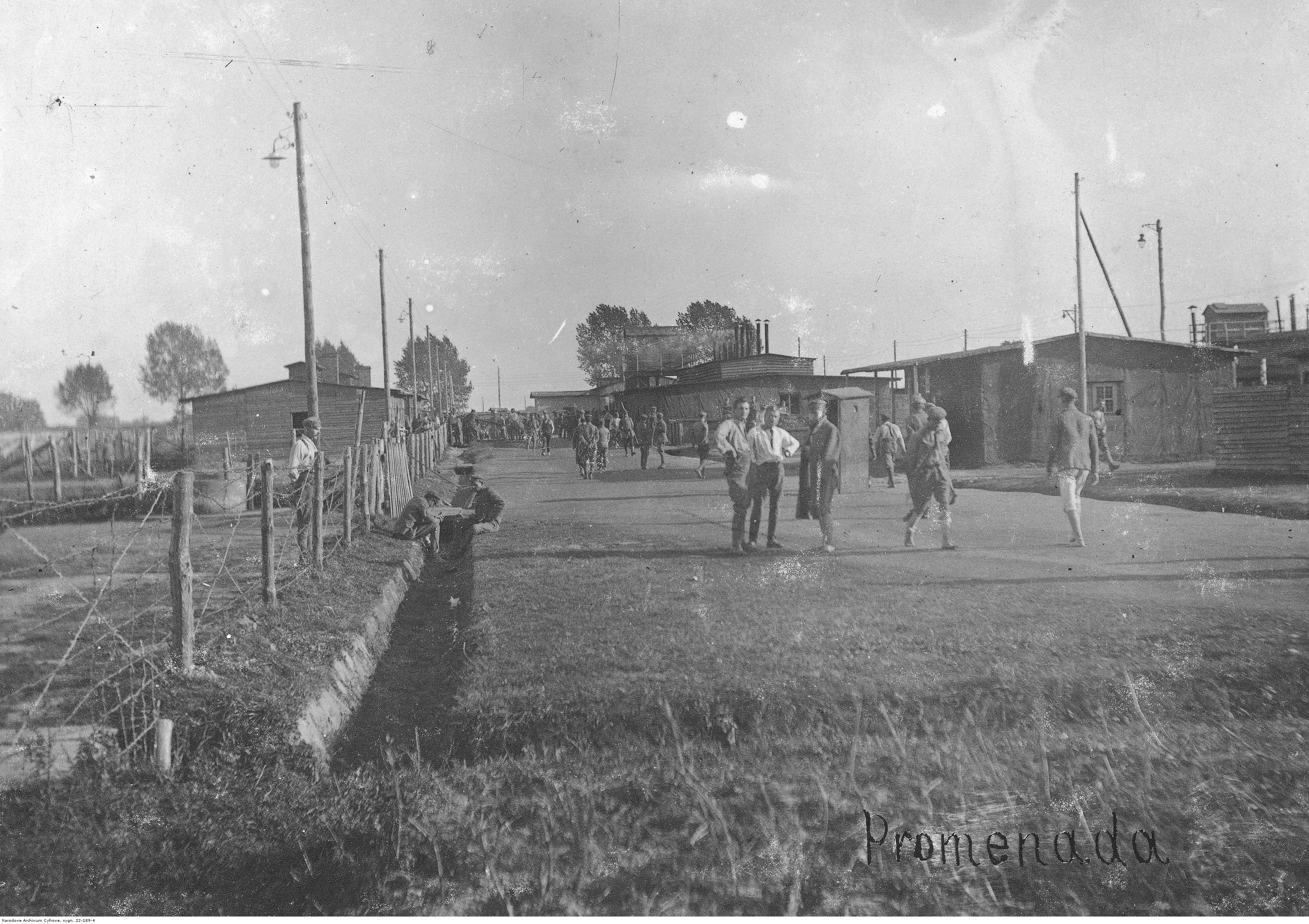
German internment camp for Polish legionnaires in Łomża in 1918

Per the Act of 5th November, Germany and Austria-Hungary proclaimed the Regency Kingdom of Poland, a German-controlled puppet state. It was formed in the western part of the former Russian Partition and did not include the more north-eastern German-occupied areas of the Russian Partition, which were instead administered by the Germans as the Ober Ost. Moreover, Germany still planned the annexation of the so-called "Polish Border Strip" and expulsion of up to 3 million of its Polish inhabitants (including Polish Jews) to make room for German colonization in accordance with the Lebensraum policy.

Following the Oath crisis, in July 1917, the Germans arrested Józef Piłsudski and his close associate Kazimierz Sosnkowski and then imprisoned them in Magdeburg. Near the end of the war, the Germans offered to release them in exchange for Piłsudski's declaration of loyalty to Germany, but Piłsudski declined. Nevertheless, Piłsudski and Sosnkowski were eventually released on 8 November 1918, after the outbreak of the German Revolution of 1918–1919. Three days later, Germany signed the Armistice of 11 November 1918 with the Allies, and Piłsudski proclaimed the independence of Poland. That day, during his speech in Warsaw, he declared that the Polish nation did not want revenge against the Germans for past wrongdoings.

==== Interbellum (1918–1939) ====
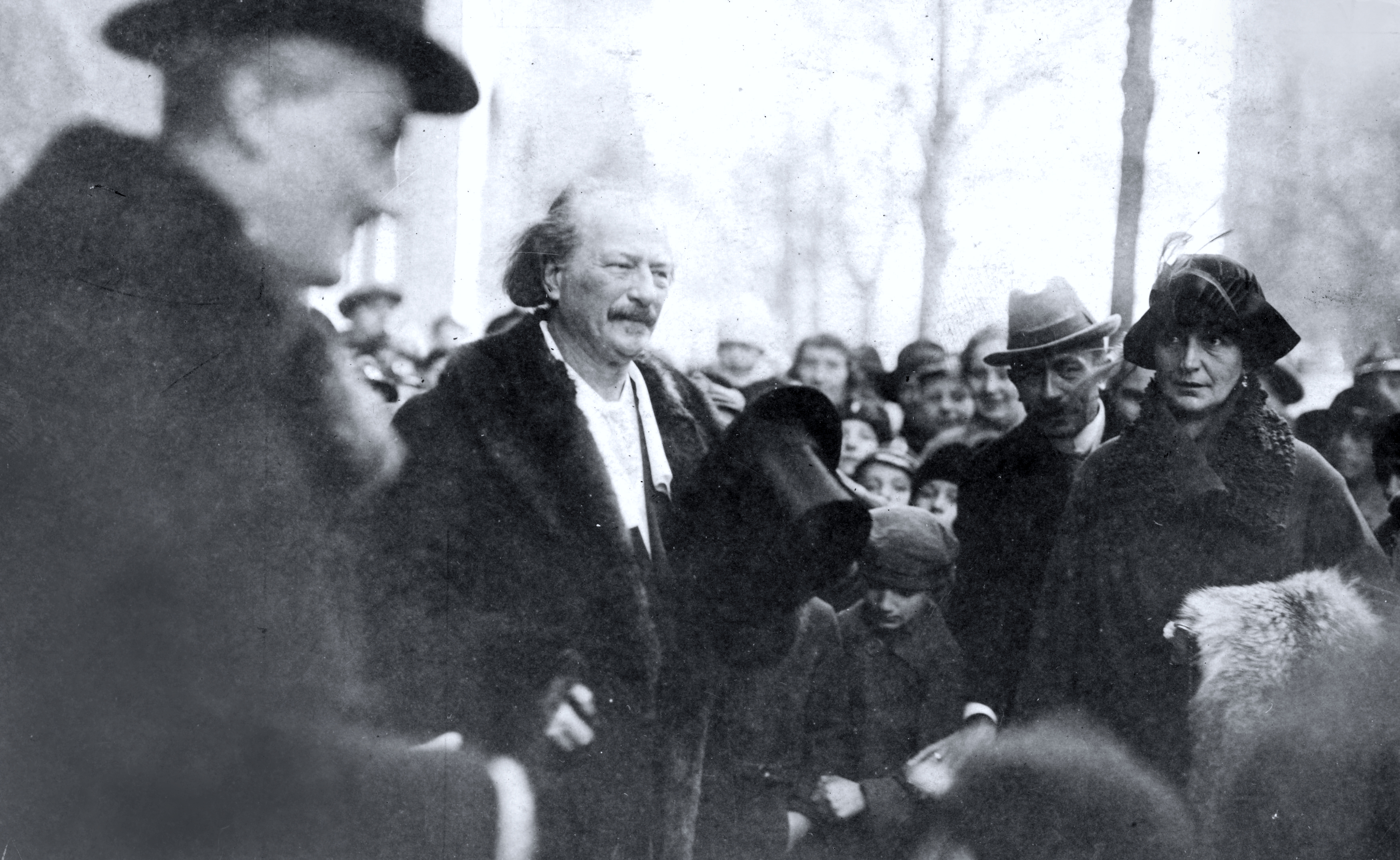
Visit of Polish composer Ignacy Jan Paderewski in Poznań on 27 December 1918, which sparked the Greater Poland uprising against Germany

After Poland regained independence in 1918, it sought to regain its former western regions, and the Polish Greater Poland uprising of 1918–19 and Silesian Uprisings against Germany broke out in the disputed regions of Greater Poland and Upper Silesia. In addition, the German Army still occupied parts of eastern Polish lands, but in February 1919 Germany allowed the Polish Army to cross through the occupied territories to the front to repel attacks by Soviet Russia at the start of the Polish–Soviet War. Polish authorities still feared German cooperation with Soviet Russia against Poland. Several German politicians called for Germany to establish relations with Soviet Russia, and Hugo Haase stated that Russians have the right to seize "their territories." In 1920, Friedrich von Boetticher assumed that Soviet Russia would recognize Germany's pre-World War I borders, and that Poland, deprived of western lands, would only survive until the end of the Polish–Soviet War, but Germany rejected a Soviet proposal for a joint war against Poland. On 20 July 1920, Germany declared neutrality with regard to the Polish–Soviet War. During the war some 36,000 to 48,300 Soviet troops and nearly 2,400 Poles were interned in Germany.

Map showing Germany (green) and Poland (orange) during the interwar period, showing the Polish corridor partitioning East Prussia from the rest of Germany, and Danzig as a free city belonging to neither country

Eventually, Poland regained the majority of the lands lost to Prussia in the Partitions of Poland, and parts of the territories lost even earlier, including the industrialized part of Upper Silesia in 1922. Germany remained hostile to Poland and refused to regard the German-Polish border as permanent nor even Poland's independence itself. Already in 1922, Chief of the German Army Hans von Seeckt stated: Poland's existence is intolerable and incompatible with the essential conditions of Germany's life. Poland must go and will go - as a result of her internal weakness and of action by Russia - with our aid.

Following Adolf Hitler’s rise to power in 1933, the possibility of a Polish-German alliance against the Soviet Union emerged. Hitler publicly expressed interest in such an alliance, viewing Poland strategically as “an outpost against Asia” and a counterweight to the USSR. From the German perspective, an alignment with Poland could secure its eastern flank while allowing Germany to focus on broader European ambitions. However, from Poland’s perspective, such offers were consistently politically and strategically unacceptable. Polish leaders, pursued a dual-pronged strategy.

They refused an alliance with Nazi Germany despite repeated overtures. Marshal Piłsudski took no notice of the proposal; he also declined personal meetings with chancellor Hitler. To resolve German–Polish customs war began in 1925, in 1934, Nazi Germany and Poland signed the German–Polish declaration of non-aggression. A trade agreement followed.

Two conferences addressed the matter of the school history-books used in Poland and in Germany:

- Warsaw, 28–9 August 1937
- Berlin, 27–9 June 1938

In the late 1930s, before the German-Soviet invasion of Poland, which started World War II, discrimination and persecution of the Polish minority in Germany, including the indigenous Poles in the territories that remained within Germany in the interbellum, intensified. Germany carried out mass arrests, expulsions, deportations to concentration camps and assassinations of local Polish leaders, activists and prominent individuals. There were numerous cases of attacks on Polish property, schools, printing houses, many Polish organizations were seized, Polish press and culture centers were closed down, Polish church services were banned. Germany carried out extensive anti-Polish propaganda, and increased censorship and confiscations of Polish press and publications.

In October 1938 Germany expelled about 17,000 Polish Jews to Poland in the Polenaktion.

On 23 August 1939, the Molotov–Ribbentrop Pact was signed by Germany and the Soviet Union, which included the Secret Protocol, which divided Central and Eastern Europe, including Poland, between the two invaders. In the following days, there were several German provocations at the Polish-German border, and on 25–26 August 1939 the German Abwehr attacked a Polish train station near the Polish-Slovak border, but it was repelled by the Polish Army (see Jabłonków incident). On 28 August 1939, a German saboteur carried out a train station bombing in Tarnów in southern Poland, killing 20 people and wounding 35 others. On 31 August 1939, Germany staged the Gleiwitz incident, a false flag attack which was to serve as a casus belli to justify the invasion of Poland, which started the next morning, without a declaration of war.

==== Second World War (1939–1945) ====
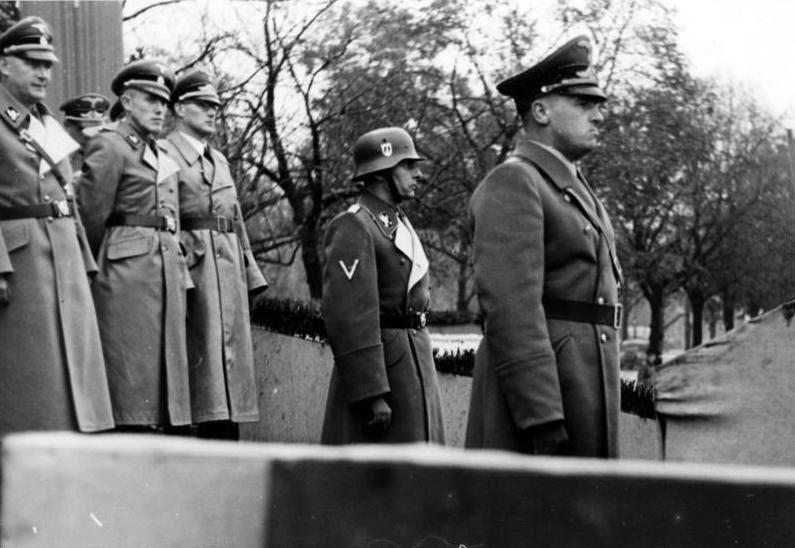
Hans Frank (right), the Governor General, and SS-Obergruppenführer Friedrich-Wilhelm Krüger (standing behind Frank), Kraków, 1939

In September 1939 Nazi Germany invaded Poland and partitioned the country together with the Soviet Union, and then occupied its western half. The western and northern portions of this territory were directly annexed to Germany, while in the remainder, the General Government was formed.

Nazi Germany's Directive No. 1306 stated that Polishness equals subhumanity. Poles, Jews and gypsies are on the same inferior level, and the Polish population was subjected to extensive genocidal policies, including large massacres, mass expulsions, roundups, arrests, incarceration, kidnapping of Polish children, kidnapping of Polish girls and women for sexual slavery, pacification actions, extermination of mentally ill people and deportations to forced labour and concentration camps, some of which were established in occupied Polish territory (including Auschwitz, Soldau, Majdanek). The Intelligenzaktion, which was launched instantly during the invasion of Poland, was the first genocidal campaign carried out by Nazi Germany. It targeted the Polish intelligentsia and Poles engaged in various activities, who were considered capable of organising or leading a Polish resistance movement, which was formed and was active throughout the war regardless. The campaign was then continued from 1940 as the AB-Aktion. Over 2.8 million Poles, including women and children, were deported to slave labour, and Poles accounted for 60% of all foreign slave workers in Germany. In March 1940, Germany issued the racist and repressive Polish decrees, which regulated the working and living conditions of Polish slave workers. Polish slave workers were obliged to wear "P" badges and were subjected to strict segregation policies, with certain activities, such as sexual intercourse with German people, being punishable by deportation to concentration camps or death. Germany also extensively looted Poland of its cultural and industrial possession and vandalized its heritage. The Catholic Church in Poland was brutally persecuted. Countless prisons and forced labour camps and several major prisoner-of-war camps were established and operated by Germany in occupied Poland, also for Allied POWs of various nationalities. In 1941 Adolf Hitler launched Operation Barbarossa, attacking the Soviet Union, after which Germany also occupied the eastern half of Poland, in which it continued the extermination of Poles, with prime examples including the massacre of Lwów professors, Ponary massacre and Czarny Las massacre. Polish Jews were among the primary victims of the German-perpetrated Holocaust, and rescuing and helping Jews by Poles were both punishable by death, not only for the rescuers, but also for their entire families. In all of German-occupied Europe, such extreme measures were only imposed in Poland.

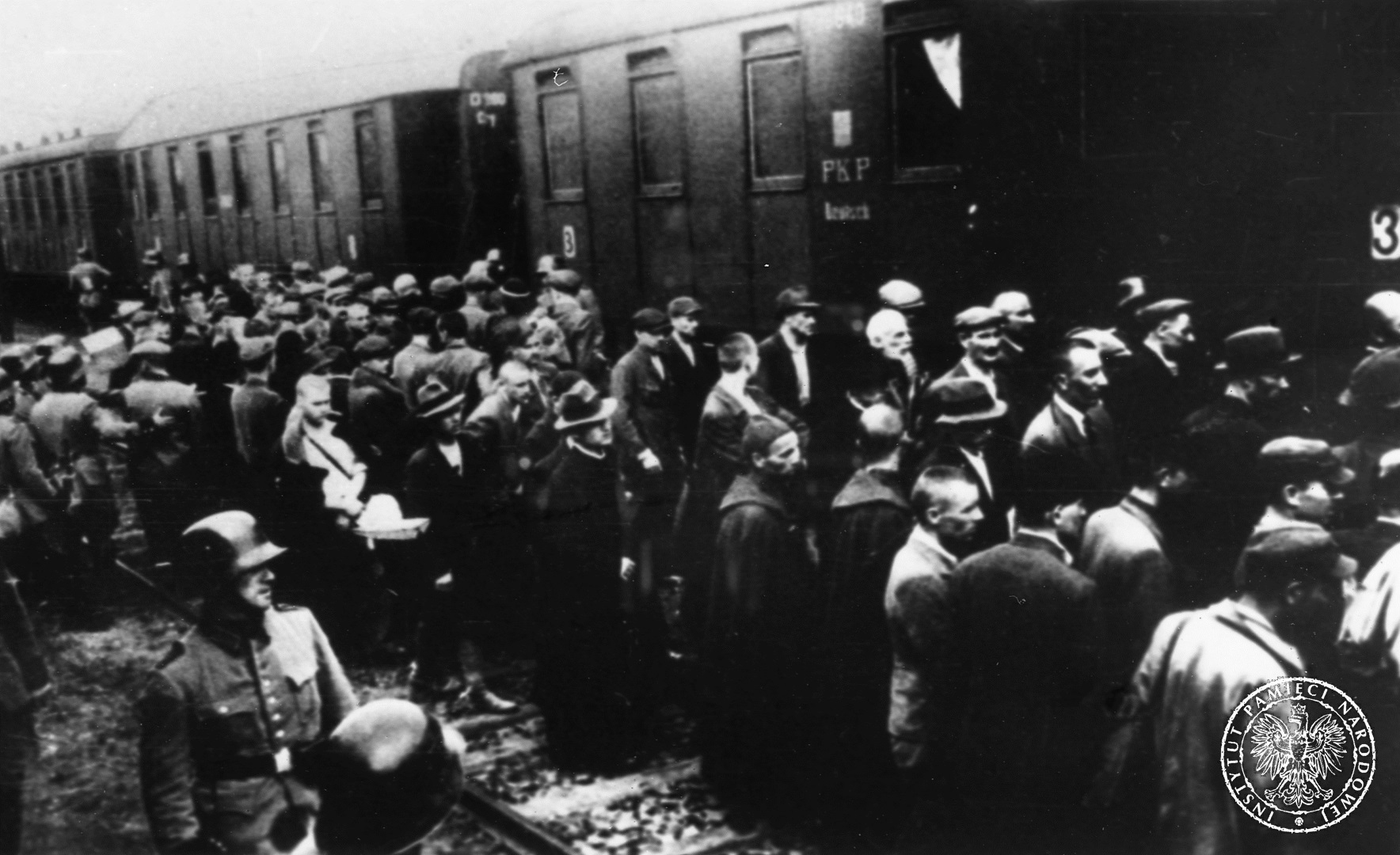
First mass transport of 728 Poles from German-occupied Tarnów to Auschwitz concentration camp in 1940

During the war, Poles fought against Germany on various war fronts as one of the Allies of World War II, including the Norwegian campaign, the Battle of France, the Battle of Britain, the North African campaign, Operation Jubilee, the Italian campaign (including the victorious Battle of Monte Cassino), Operation Overlord, the Vistula–Oder Offensive and the Western Allied invasion of Germany, liberating parts of Belgium, France, Italy and the Netherlands from German occupation.

The Polish resistance movement, including the Home Army and the Polish Underground State, was the largest underground resistance movement in all of German-occupied Europe. Poland did not establish a collaborationist government under German occupation, and pre-war Polish Prime Minister Kazimierz Bartel was even murdered by the Germans for refusing to form one. However, the Polish Holy Cross Mountains, established in August 1944 and led by Antoni Szacki, sometimes collaborated with the Nazis to further its anti-communist, anti-Jewish and totalitarian goals. Brigade Several Polish uprisings against Germany broke out, including the Zamość uprising, Iwieniec Uprising, Operation Ostra Brama, Lwów uprising and the Warsaw Uprising. During the latter, SS chief Heinrich Himmler anticipated a total destruction of Warsaw, the capital of the former Polish nation, which has supposedly blocked the Germans' road to the east for 700 years. Following the Polish loss in the uprising, Germany carried out the planned destruction of Warsaw in late 1944, and in October 1944, Himmler stated in regards to Warsaw: The city must completely disappear from the surface of the earth and serve only as a transport station for the Wehrmacht. No stone can remain standing. Every building must be razed to its foundation.

Following Operation Barbarossa, the Germans and German-held Polish forced laborers discovered the mass graves of over 4,000 Polish officers and intelligentsia who were murdered in the Katyn Forest by the Soviet Union in 1940. In April 1943, Germany exposed the crime, now known as the Katyn massacre, to the world. The Germans allowed the International Red Cross and Polish Red Cross to the site, and formed the International Katyn Commission to investigate the massacre.

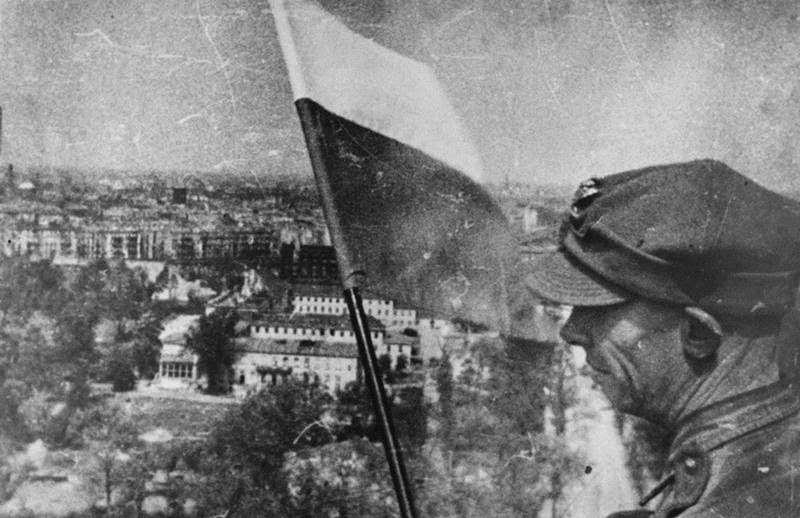
Battle of Berlin: Polish flag raised over the Berlin Victory Column on 2 May 1945

At the Tehran Conference which was held in 1943, Stalin demanded that the post-war territory of Germany and Poland be redrawn further west as a buffer between the Soviet Union and Germany.

Nazi Germany killed nearly 6 million Polish citizens, including Polish academics, doctors, lawyers, nobles, priests and others. Poland was subjected to the largest amount of destruction among all German-occupied countries during World War II.

Following the defeat of Germany in 1945, anti-German sentiment was widespread among the oppressed Poles, a sentiment which was triggered by the policy which the Germans implemented during their occupation of Poland, this sentiment was reflected in the expulsion of Germans from the territories which were assigned to Poland.

==== Cold War (1945–1969) ====
After the end of World War II, there were over 1.7 million Polish displaced persons in Allied-occupied Germany, including 700,000 in the Soviet occupation zone, 540,000 in the British occupation zone, 400,000 in the American occupation zone and 68,000 in the French occupation zone.

East German–Polish relations

- East Germany: Poland

During the Cold War, East Germany shared the fate of Poland, which fell into the Soviet sphere of influence, and both countries had Soviet-installed communist regimes, and therefore enjoyed good relations. In 1950, both countries signed the Treaty of Zgorzelec, which officially confirmed and recognized the Polish-East German border.

However, while the Poles were still insisting 20 years after the end of the war that the 1945 Potsdam Agreement had created favorable and just borders encompassing the entire historical territory of Poland, the GDR saw the loss of the old German East as a reparation for the Nazi crimes against the Polish nation. The FRG of the time did not yet accept the Oder-Neisse boundary. During the early Cold War, Poland–West Germany relations were generally strained.

War, flight, and expulsion from west-shifted Poland had torn apart a great many of families who pressured the German authorities to support their relatives for leaving Poland. During 1950–55, difficult negotiations for family reunions were conducted between Poland and the GDR. The GDR was very cautious not to cause Polish anger but anything that went beyond the reunification of separated spouses, minor children with their parents was rejected by the Polish authorities.

Family reunions were handled more liberally by the Polish from 1956 on but the more generous exit policy for Germans from Poland was flanked by massive attempts by the Polish and GDR authorities to influence the Germans to stay in Poland or move to the GDR. In 1959/60, as was the case several times in the 1950s, family reunifications were declared complete by the Polish and in the 1960s family reunions were handled restrictively by the Polish.

The European policy of détente at the beginning of the 1970s, and in particular the signing of the Warsaw Treaty ushered in the next phase of family reunions and departures of Germans, preferably the "autochthonous" population, from Poland, especially to West Germany. Eventually, the Polish had to realize that their assimilation policy towards the German minority - the German citizens and the so-called "autochthons" who insisted on their German ethnicity - had failed.

==== Ostpolitik (1970–1989) ====
The relations between West Germany and Poland improved through Willy Brandt's Ostpolitik. West Germany recognized the Oder-Neisse line as Poland's western border in the Treaty of Warsaw. The Warschauer Kniefall gesture by Chancellor and future Nobel Peace Prize laureate Willy Brandt, which took place at the Monument to the Warsaw Ghetto Uprising Heroes in 1970, was regarded as a major step in the process of reconciliation between the two countries.

From 1972 to 1980, Poland and East Germany enjoyed visa-free travel. Due to large anti-communist protests and the emergence of the Solidarity movement in Poland, East Germany unilaterally terminated the visa-free travel agreement and closed the border.

==== From the fall of Communism to accession (1989–2004) ====
Helmut Kohl and Tadeusz Mazowiecki during meeting in Krzyżowa, 1989

After the fall of communism, Poland and the reunited Germany have had a somewhat positive, but occasionally strained relationship due to sensitive political issues. In March 1990, German chancellor Helmut Kohl caused a diplomatic firestorm when he suggested that a reunified Germany would not accept the Oder–Neisse line, and implied that the Federal Republic might wish to restore the frontier of 1937, by force if necessary. After the statement caused a major international backlash that threatened to halt German reunification, Kohl retracted his comments after knuckling under international rebuke, and assured both the United States and the Soviet Union that a reunified Germany would accept the Oder–Neisse line as the final border between Poland and Germany.

In the 1990s, Germany opposed Poland joining NATO, according to archived German Foreign Ministry files released in 2022. Germany, pursuing a pro-Russian policy, tried to discourage Poland from joining NATO during confidential discussions, and tried to convince other member countries against Poland's NATO membership. Poland eventually joined NATO in 1999.

Poland, Germany and France are part of the Weimar Triangle which was created in 1991 to strengthen cooperation between the three countries.

In the 1990s, some reparations from World War II were continued to be repaid to Poland and that money was distributed through the Foundation for Polish-German Reconciliation, a foundation supported by both governments.

The Polish-German border is 467 km (290 mi) long.

==== World War II reparations ====
On 1 September 2022, Poland's government headed by Prime Minister Mateusz Morawiecki presented to the public a three volume report detailing war damages caused by the German occupation of Poland between 1939 and 1945. The report, which covered both human and material loses, placed the value of wartime damages caused by the German occupation at $1.3 trillion. The report also addressed the issue of post-war reparations stating that apart from the 1953 non-binding resolution made by the then communist government led by Bolesław Bierut under pressure from the Soviet Union, no official diplomatic steps were made to settle the issue of wartime reparations, and no formal diplomatic note was ever presented to the East German government informing it of Poland's intentions to renounce its reparation rights.

On 2 October 2022, the Polish Foreign Minister Zbigniew Rau signed a formal diplomatic note asking Germany to start an official negotiations process, and on 3 October 2022 presented the diplomatic note to the visiting German Foreign Minister Annalena Baerbock.

Earlier in December 2021, German Chancellor Olaf Scholz rejected the idea of paying further World War II reparations to Poland. According to the German government, there is no legal basis for further compensation payments. The Polish government rejects this view, stating that the then Polish communist government was under the sway of the Soviet Union and that its 1954 refusal is non-binding.

As a consequence of aggression by Nazi Germany, Poland lost about a fifth of its population and much of Poland was subjected to enormous destruction of its industry and infrastructure.

However, as a consequence of the Potsdam Agreement, Poland obtained a quarter of Germany's territory in the borders of 1937, whose largely German-speaking population which was subjected to expulsion and Polonization. The Potsdam Agreement stipulated that Soviet reparations would be satisfied from the Soviet occupation zone in Germany and that the USSR would in turn satisfy the claims of the Polish People's Republic. On the one hand, the transfer of these considerable reparations payments was dependent on the Soviet leadership, but on the other hand ended comparatively late compared to the western occupation zones due to a declaration by Moscow on 22 August 1953. On 16 August 1945, a treaty on distribution of German reparations had been signed in Moscow. For the Polish, this treaty became a symbol of Soviet exploitation of Poland, even though Poland received 15% of reparations from the Soviet zone and 30% of reparations from West Germany. However, 6 billion dollars, which was seen to amount to the win Poland had gained by the border shift in the west, was subtracted from this amount.

There is a consensus that the German eastern provinces gained by Poland were economically better developed than the lost Kresy. A recent proposal for a macroeconomic calculation of the economic consequences of the "westward shift" of Poland concluded that the German eastern provinces were valued 25,8 billion International Dollars, while the whole of the Kresy was valued 9,4 billion International Dollars. Therefore, German authors point out that Poland was overcompensated for the loss of the Eastern Borderlands, yielding a net gain at the expense of Germany.

The fixing of the Oder-Neisse border can only mark a renunciation of territory in favor of Poland in German-Polish relations. Authors have pointed out that the Treaty of Zgorzelec is hence of utmost relevance in the context of reparations. Communist Poland acknowledged the GDR to act on behalf of Germany as a whole when recognizing the Oder-Neisse Line amounting to a loss of territory equal in size to the territory of the GDR.

Corresponding to the conclusion of the Treaty of Zgorzelec seen as in the name of whole Germany, Poland renounced further reparations, which, according to scholars, must be seen as likewise applying to the whole of Germany.

==== Following accession to the European Union (2004–present) ====
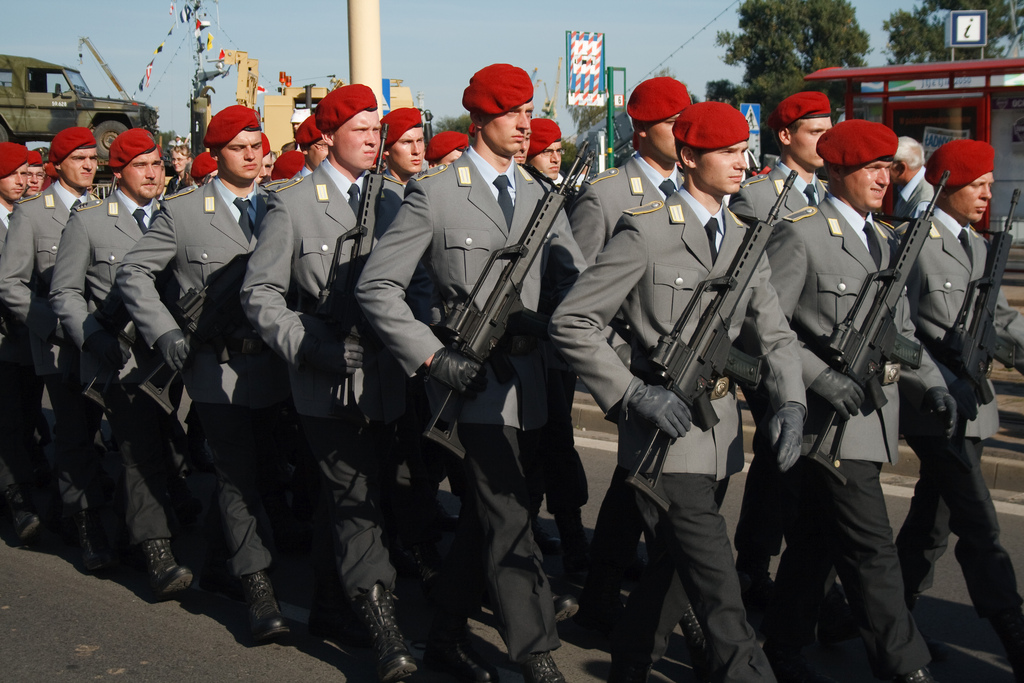
German soldiers at a military parade in Szczecin, Poland in 2009 marking the 10th anniversary of the NATO Multinational Corps Northeast

German–Polish relations are sometimes strained when topics like World War II and the postwar forced expulsion of the German citizens from the territories assigned to Poland are brought up. Occasional xenophobic statements by politicians on both sides, most notably Erika Steinbach and Jarosław Kaczyński, have slowed the improvement of the relations.

Polish firefighters helped in flood recovery in Germany during the 2002 and 2021 floods, and helped extinguish wildfires in 2019.

In 2007, Poland joined the Schengen Area, and passport-free and visa-free travel between Germany and Poland is allowed since.

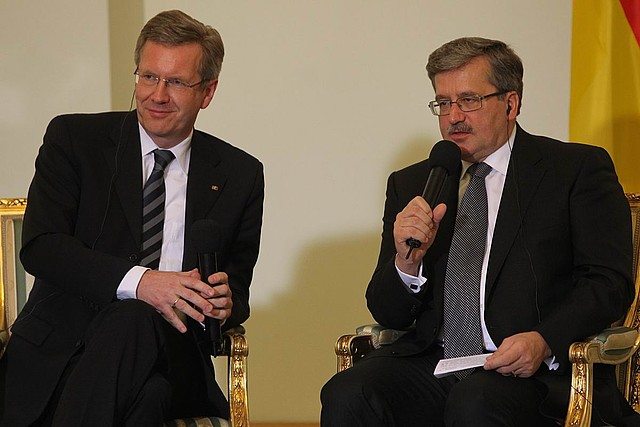
German President Christian Wulff and Polish President Bronisław Komorowski, 2010

On 24 September 2013 Lech Wałęsa suggested the creation of a political union between the Republic of Poland and the Federal Republic of Germany; his reason was that the borders in Europe don't matter anymore and in the future they will change anyway.

Poland and Germany have held intergovernmental consultations to discuss the political and economic cooperation between the two countries on a number of occasions in the past. In 2018, Polish Foreign Minister Jacek Czaputowicz and his German counterpart Heiko Maas agreed a to pass a declaration specifying the strategic priorities for German-Polish cooperation which stated that "both countries support a multilateral, rules-based order and champion a united Europe".

In 2020, Poland surpassed Italy to become Germany's fifth biggest trading partner as well as the biggest one in East-Central Europe.

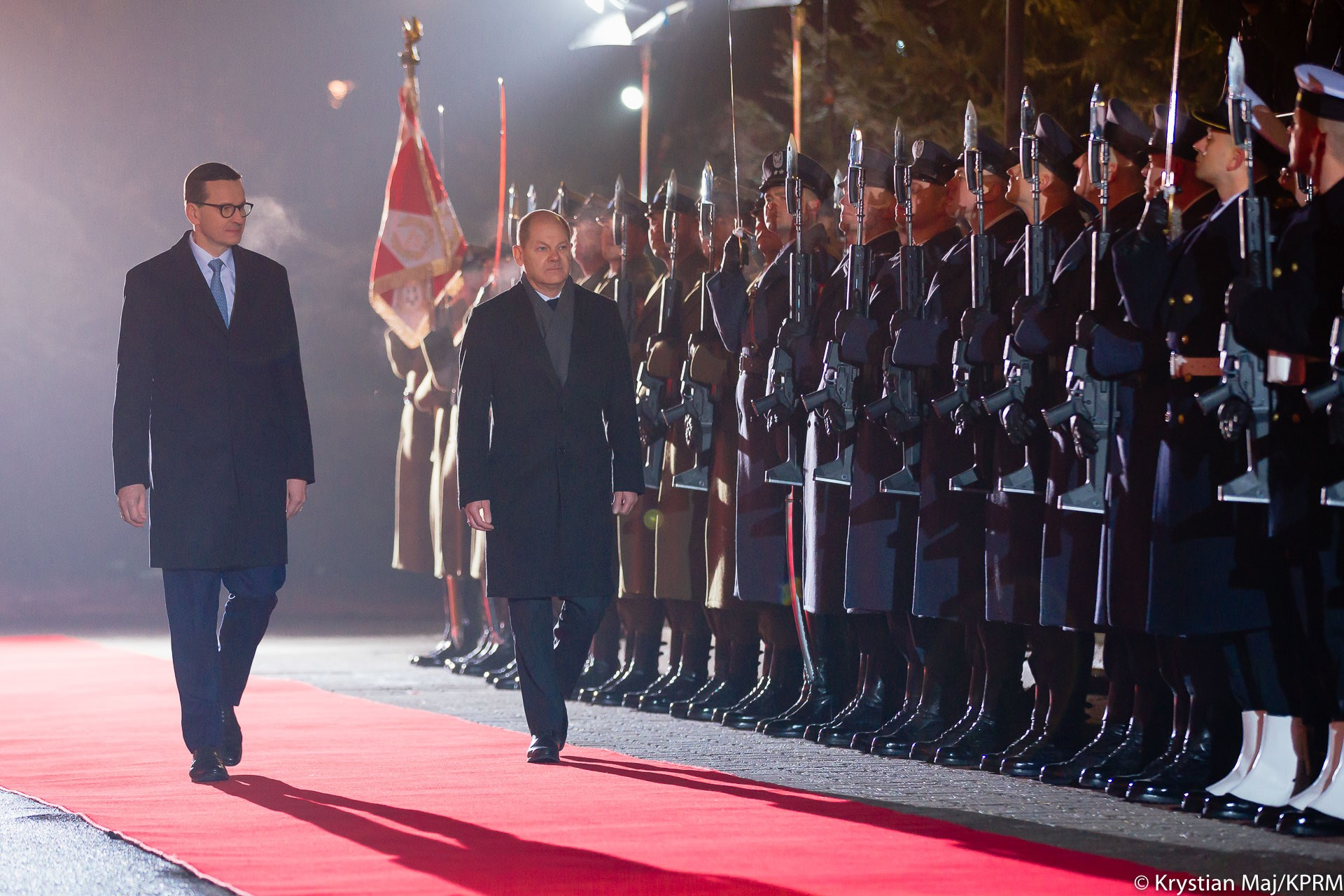
Prime Minister Mateusz Morawiecki and Chancellor Olaf Scholz during welcoming ceremony in Warsaw, 2022

On 15 September 2021, the German Foreign Minister Heiko Maas announced a project to build a monument commemorating the Polish civilian victims of World War II in Berlin that would "honour their lives, their resistance and their courage". He also revealed plans to establish a forum for remembrance and exchange with Poland stating that "The future forum [...] could become a milestone for German-Polish reconciliation. For addressing the past is not something we only owe to the dead. For Germans and Poles it remains the basis of our common path towards the future".

To help combat the COVID-19 pandemic, Poland sold some 6.5 million COVID-19 vaccines to Germany.

On 2 July 2024, the Polish-German intergovernmental consultations took place in Warsaw. Prime Minister Donald Tusk and Chancellor Olaf Scholz stressed the close relationship between the two countries and announced a joint action plan for a more intense cooperation between Poland and Germany in key areas including security and defence, support for Ukraine in the context of the ongoing Russian invasion, business relations, enlargement of the EU and questions regarding history.

===== 2025 border crisis =====
On 3 July 2025, former Polish Prime Minister Mateusz Morawiecki stated that "The Polish western border is attacked by German services, through the flood of illegal immigrants", and that the Polish–German border must be protected by the inhabitants themselves, suggesting that police patrols, also Polish–German, are hostile to Polish citizens. Since then, numerous groups, called "Citizen Patrols", such as the Ruch Obrony Granic (ROG), have emerged, engaging in vigilante border control. The then President-elect, Karol Nawrocki has thanked Robert Bąkiewicz for establishing the ROG.

The border protests have received support from the Confederation and Law and Justice parties, which have also condemned the alleged lack of response by Prime Minister Donald Tusk and the government.

On 7 June, Poland temporarily reinstated border checks with Germany and Lithuania for 30 days until 5 August, the maximum amount allowed under EU law. On 23 June, the head of the Ministry of Internal Affairs and Administration, Tomasz Siemoniak, announced that controls on the borders would be extended. On 6 August, the control was extended to 4 November.

== Resident diplomatic missions ==
=== Polish diplomatic missions in Germany ===
Poland has an embassy in Berlin and consulates-general in Cologne, Hamburg and Munich.

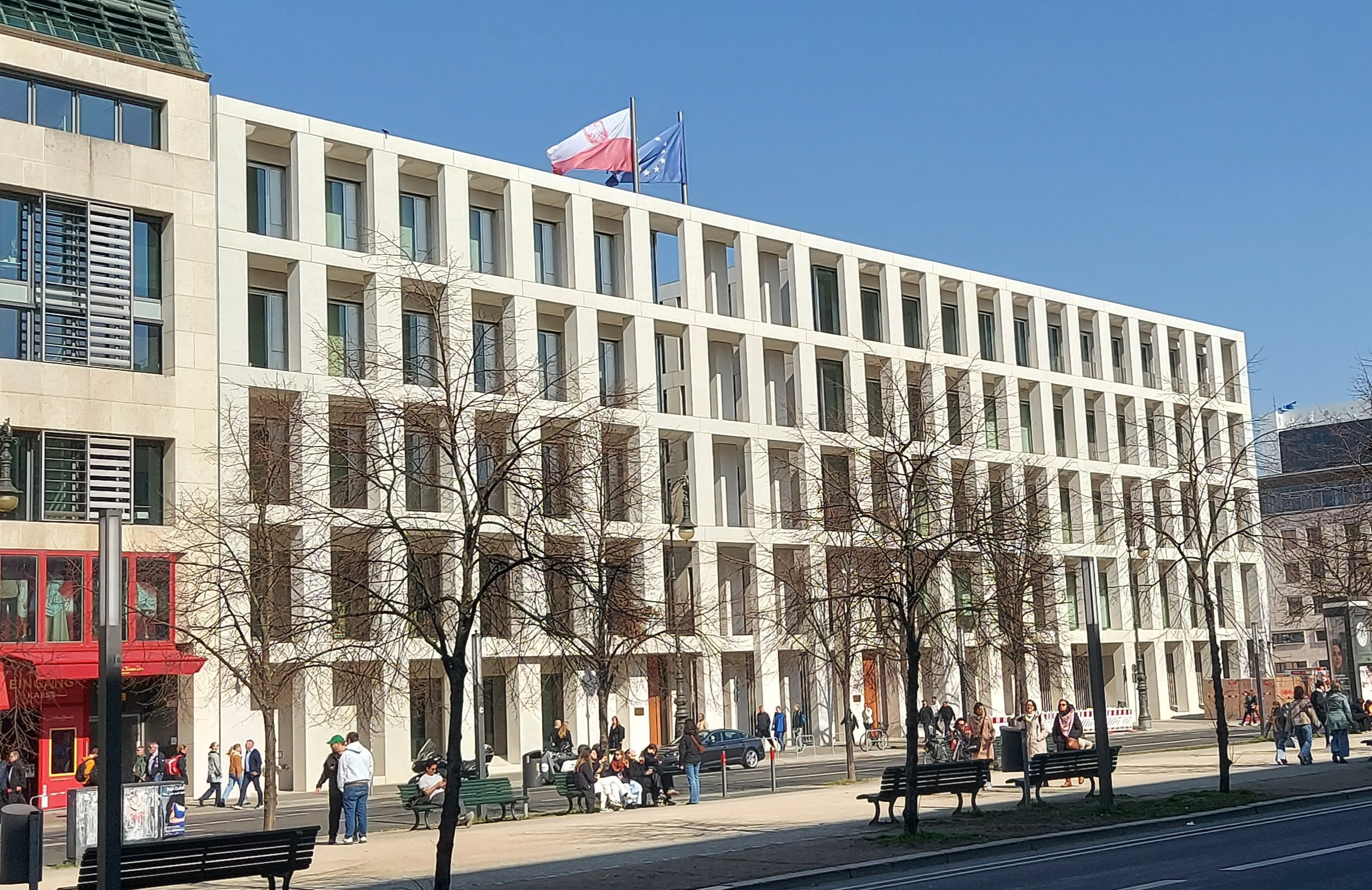
Embassy of Poland in Berlin

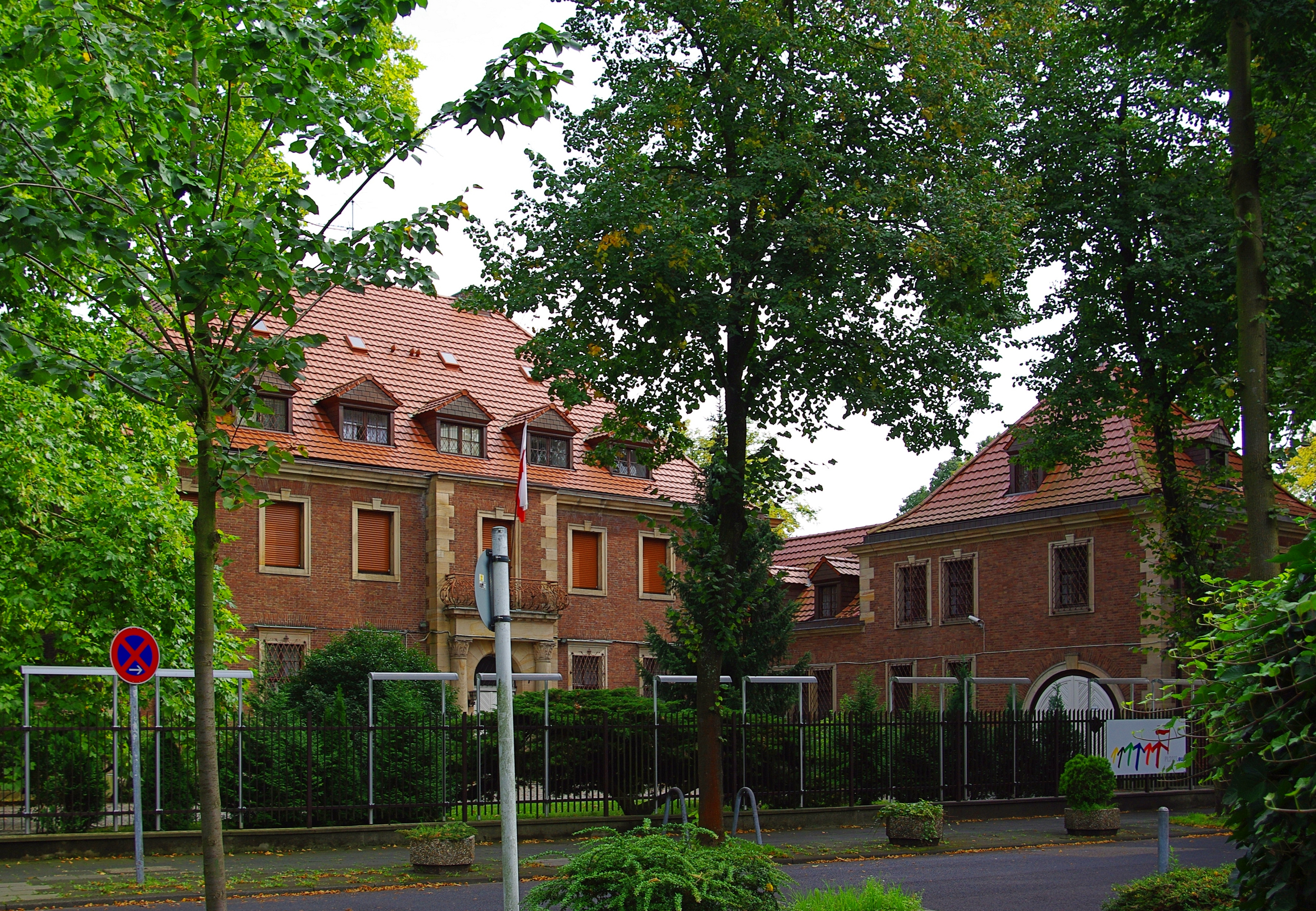
Consulate-General of Poland in Cologne

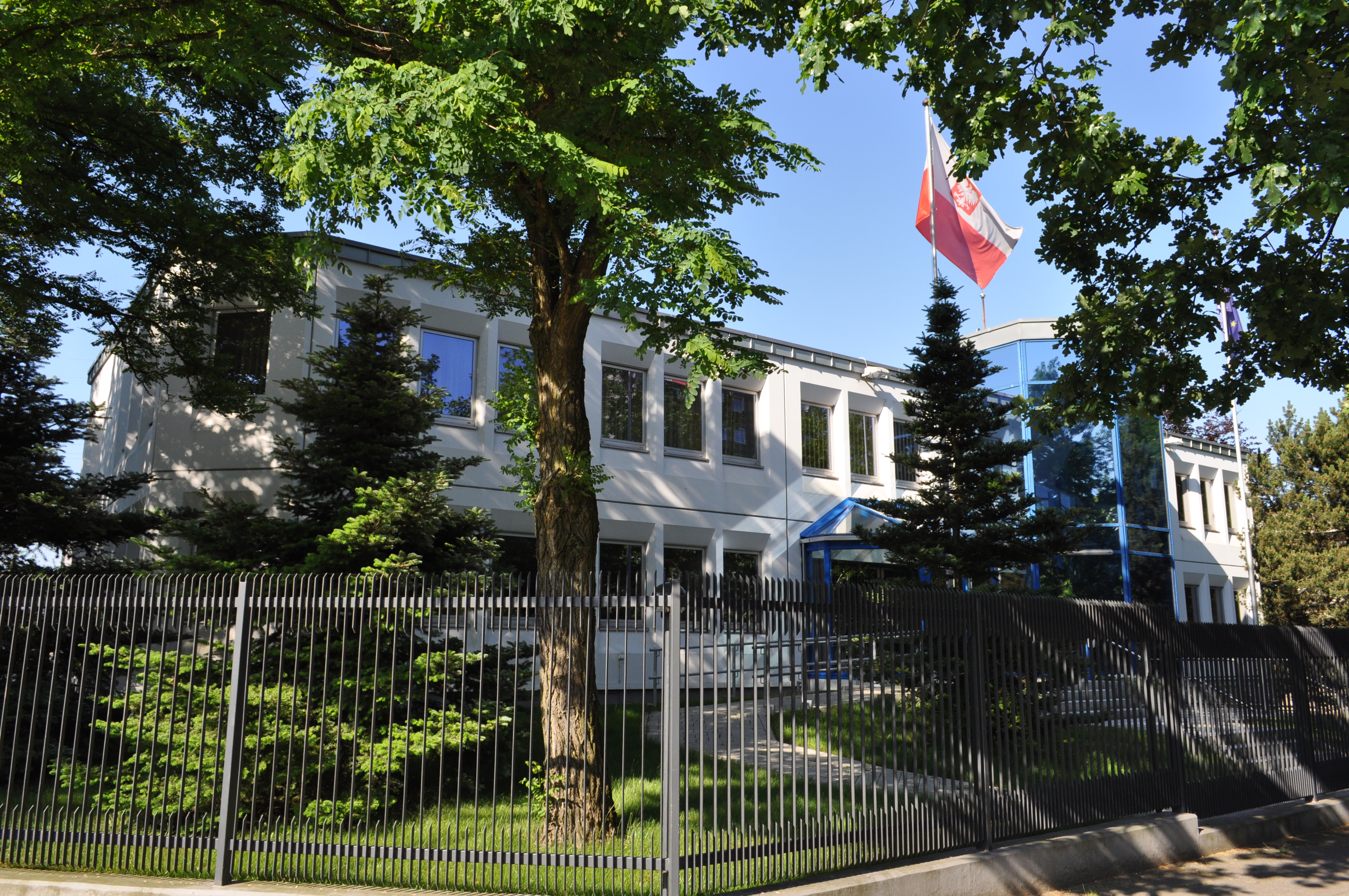
Consulate-General of Poland in Hamburg

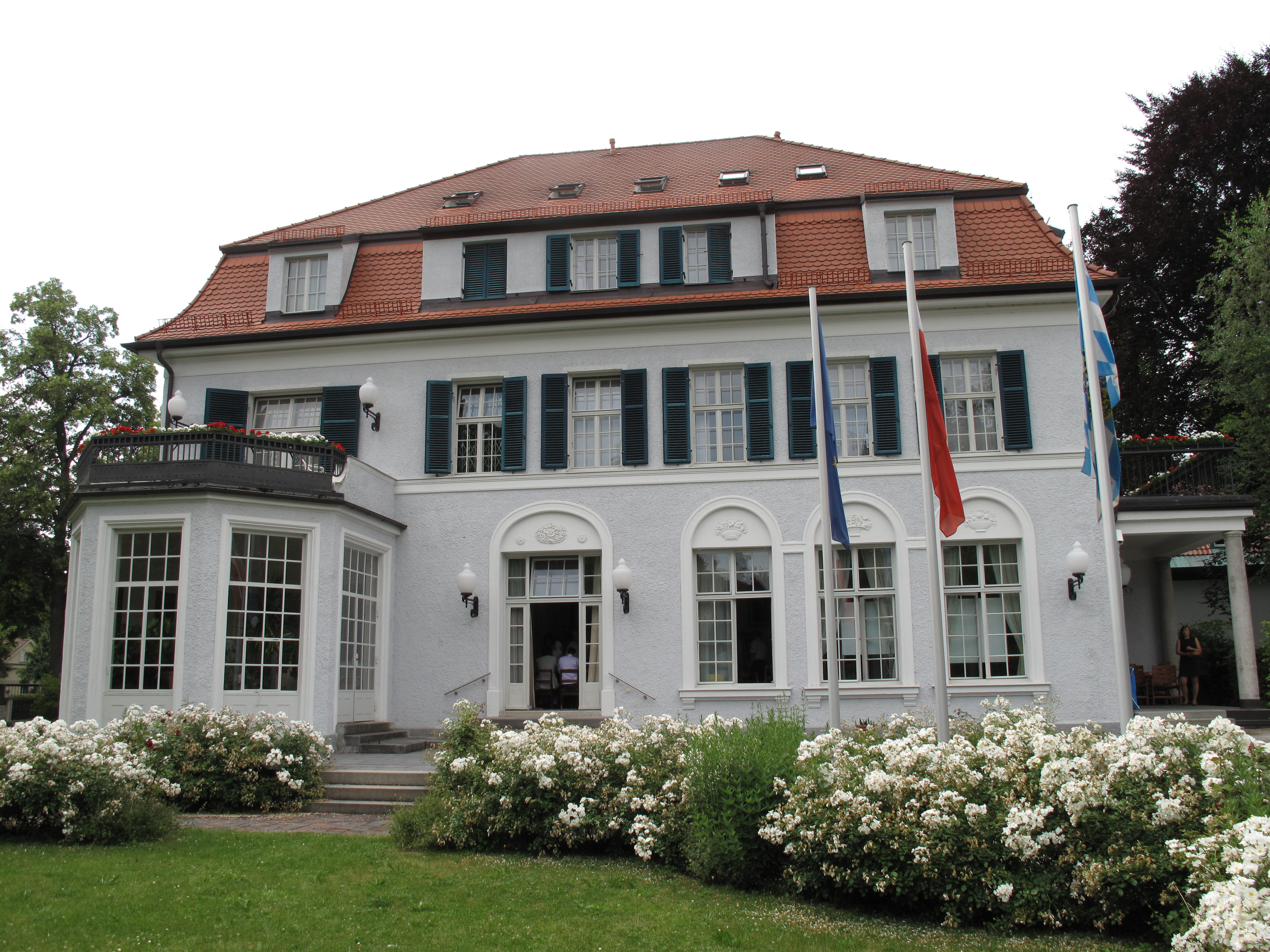
Consulate-General of Poland in Munich

=== German diplomatic missions in Poland ===
Germany has an embassy in Warsaw and consulates-general in Gdańsk, Kraków and Wrocław and a consulate in Opole.

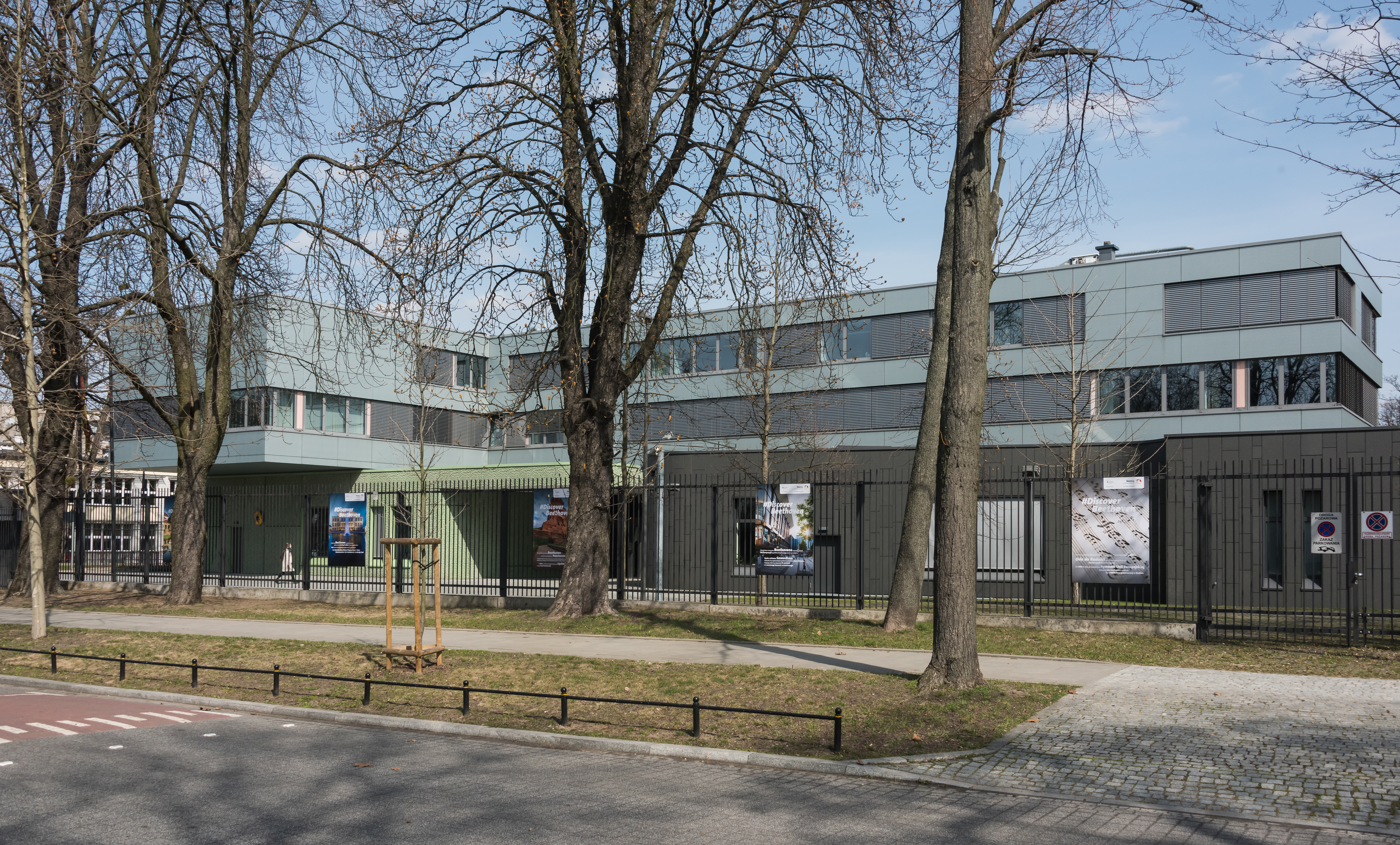
Embassy of Germany in Warsaw

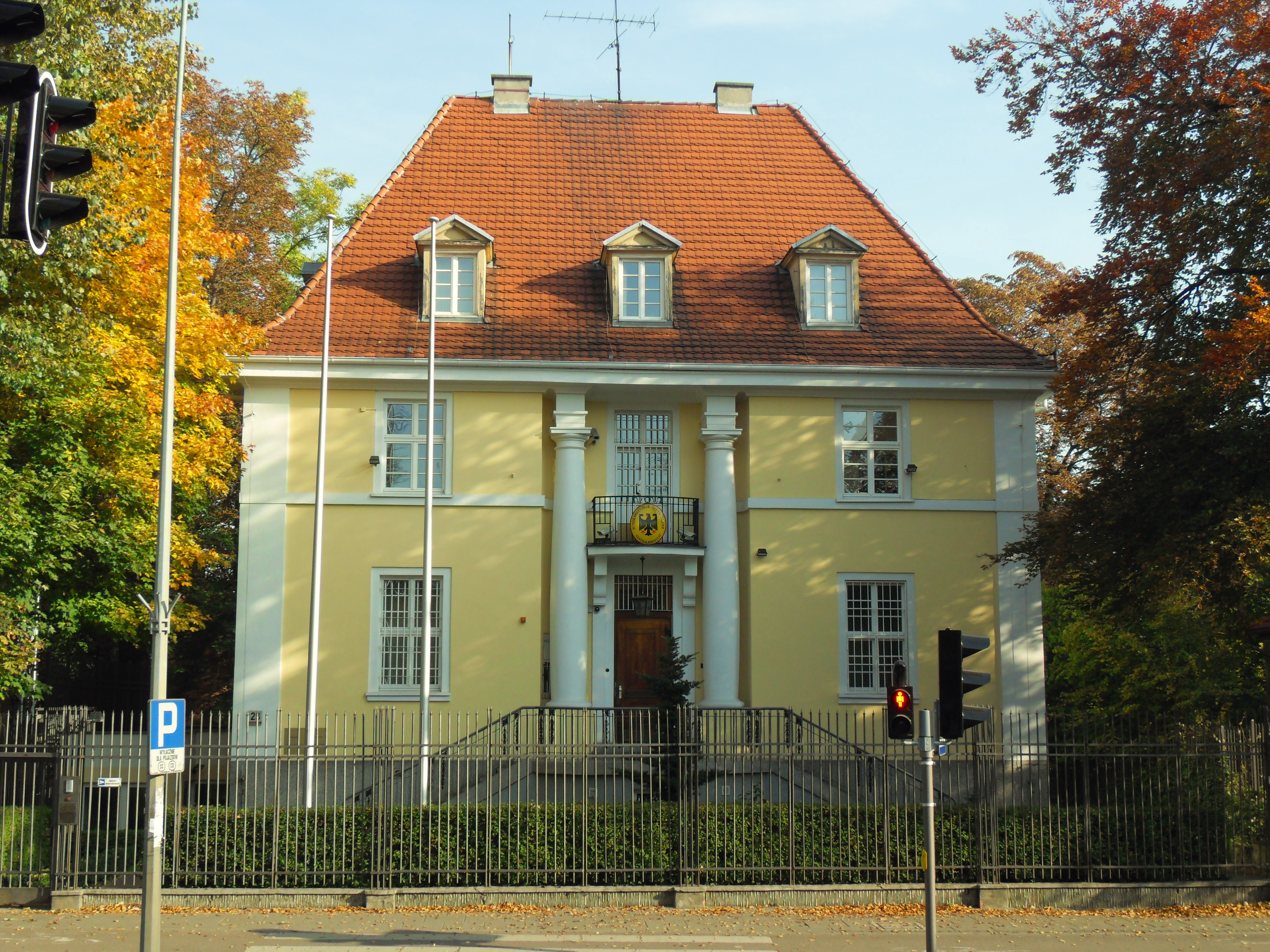
Consulate-General of Germany in Gdańsk

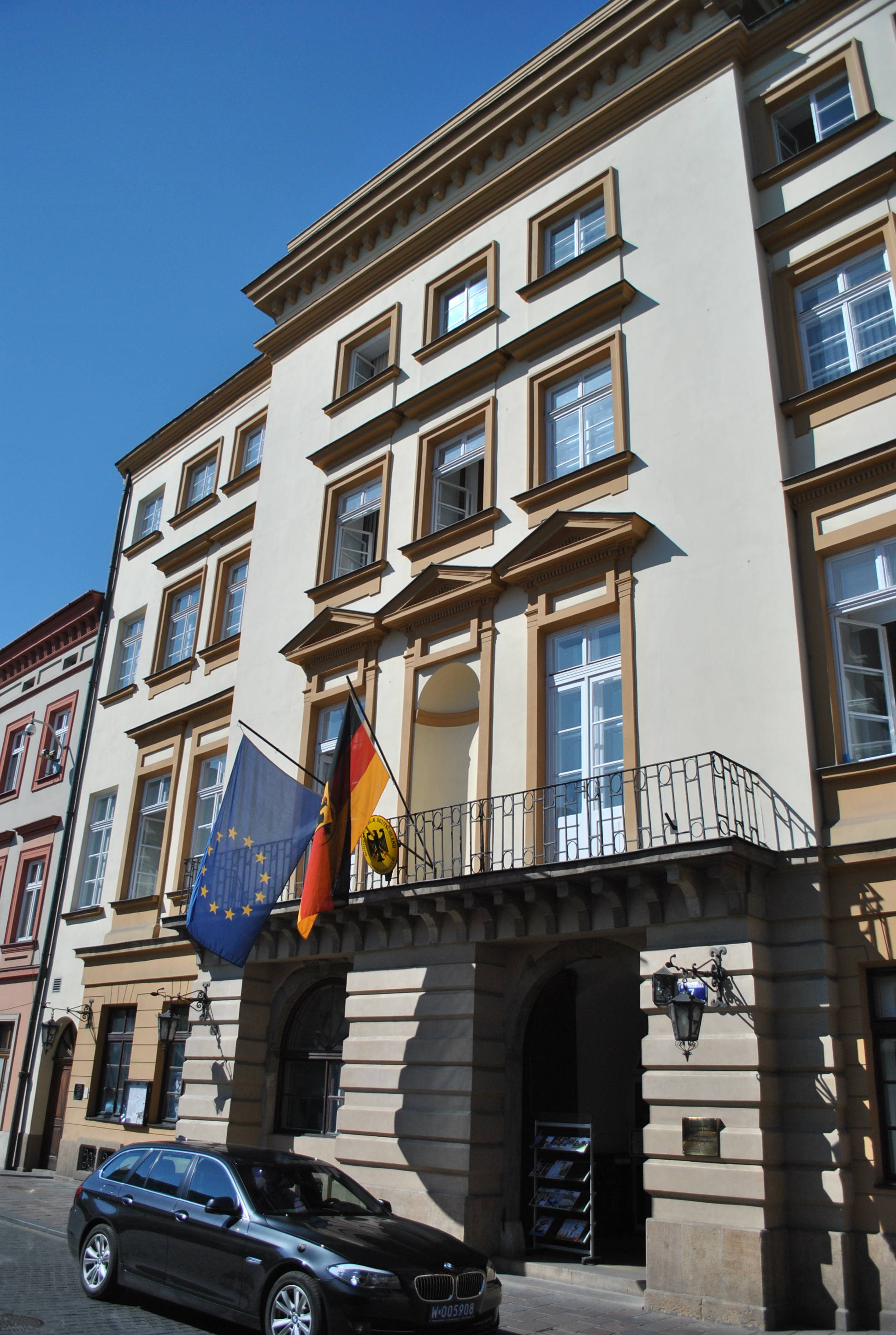
Consulate-General of Germany in Kraków

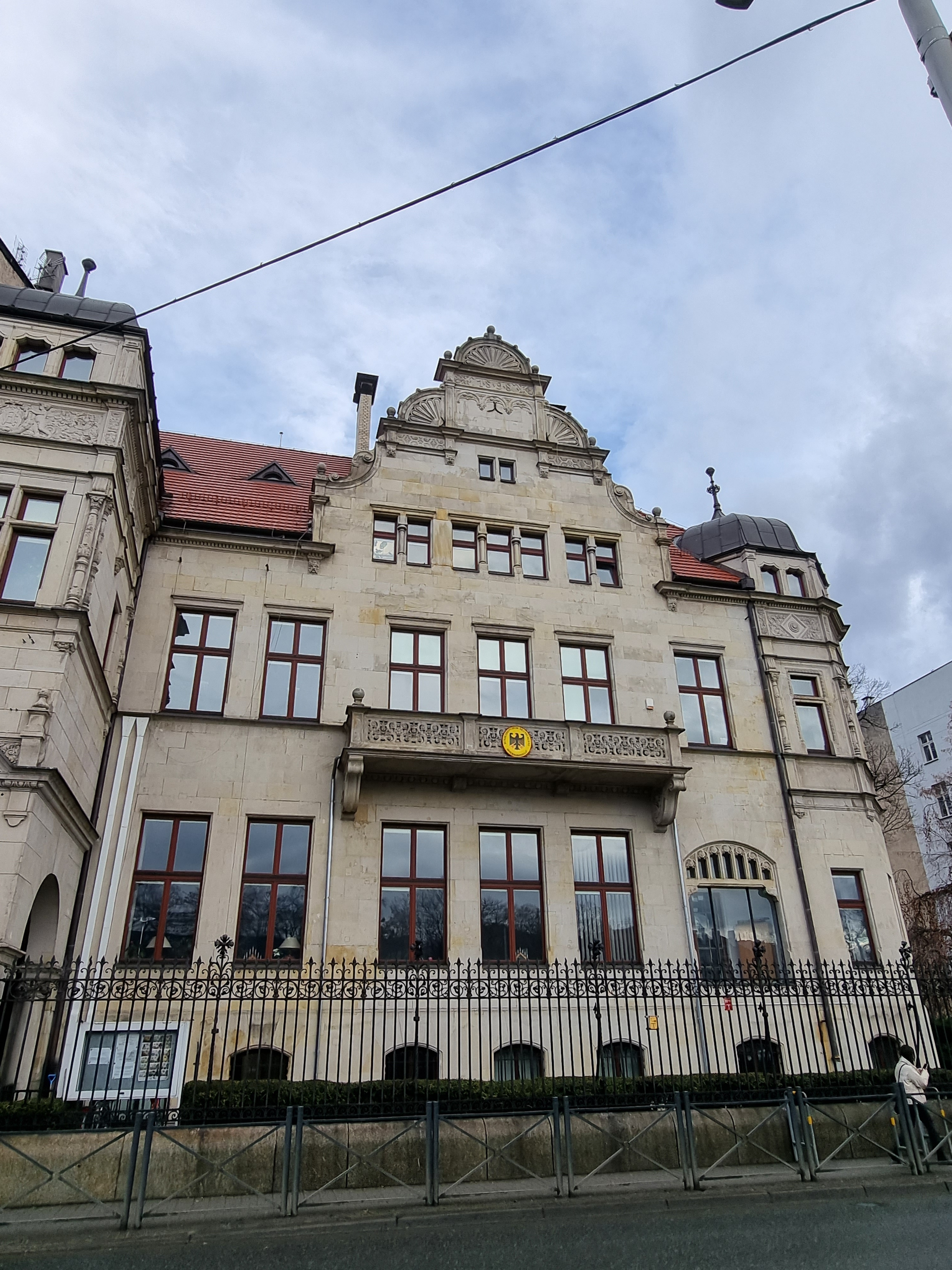
Consulate-General of Germany in Wrocław

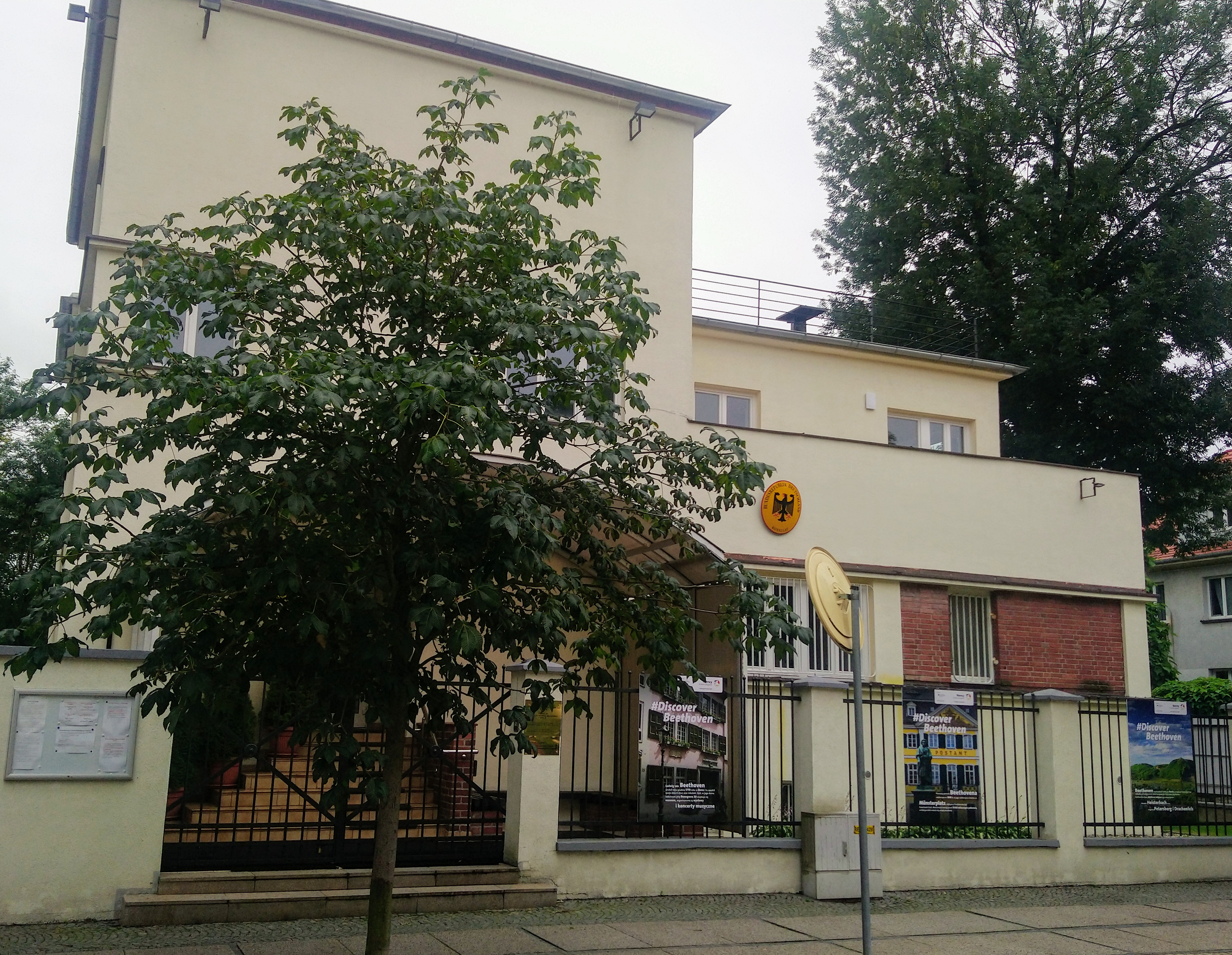
Consulate of Germany in Opole

== See also ==
- History of Poland
- Poles in Germany
- German minority in Poland
- German–Polish Border Treaty, 1990; now in effect
- German–Polish declaration of non-aggression, 1934
- List of twin towns and sister cities in Germany
- List of twin towns and sister cities in Poland
- Poland in the European Union
- Germany–Poland border
- Weimar Triangle

== Notes and references ==
=== Works cited ===
- Kudrzycki, Zbigniew (2008). "Wojna polsko-bolszewicka na pograniczu Prus Wschodnich i Mazowsza". Zeszyty Naukowe Ostrołęckiego Towarzystwa Naukowego (in Polish). XXII. ISSN 0860-9608.
- Matelski, Dariusz (2004). "Polacy w Niemczech między wojnami (1919–1939)". Przegląd Nauk Historycznych (in Polish). III (2 (6)).
- Materski, Wojciech; Szarota, Tomasz (2009). Poland 1939–1945. Casualties and the victims of repressions under the Nazi and the Soviet occupations [Polska 1939–1945. Straty osobowe i ofiary represji pod dwiema okupacjami] (excerpts online). Institute of National Remembrance (IPN). Hardcover, 353 pages. ISBN 978-83-7629-067-6. With a Foreword by Janusz Kurtyka (IPN); and expert contributions by Waldemar Grabowski, Franciszek Piper, and Andrzej Krzysztof Kunert. Archived from the original on 31 March 2012.
- Nowosielski, Michał (2011). "Profil działalności polskich organizacji w Niemczech". Przegląd Polonijny (in Polish). 37 (3 (141)).
