= Border Defence Movement =

Illegal immigration movement in Poland

- Ruch Obrony Granic
- Other name: ROG
- Leader: Robert Bąkiewicz
- Founded: 27 March 2025
- Country: Poland
- Active regions: Western Borderlands
- Ideology: Anti-immigration
- Political position: Far-right
- Size: 7,000
- Website: ruchobronygranic.pl

The Border Defence Movement (Polish: Ruch Obrony Granic, ROG) is a vigilante movement, which has also been described as a paramilitary group, founded and led by Robert Bąkiewicz created to defend Poland from the perceived threat of illegal immigration from Germany. It organises citizens' patrols along the Germany–Poland border.

== Overview ==
Activists marching in Praga-Północ display the ROG's logo on their clothing, 2026

The ROG was founded on 27 March 2025 by former Independence March leader Robert Bąkiewicz. As of July 2025, the ROG has about 7,000 members. The organisation is modelled on far-right vigilante groups operating on the Mexico–United States border. The ROG also has links to the Hungarian neo-Nazi Our Homeland Movement. The Movement organizes citizens' patrols across Poland's borders, but proclaims that it is not an enemy of the Border Guard (SG).

Per a 2025 poll by Opinia 24, the ROG has the highest percentage of support amongst men who vote for Confederation Liberty and Independence(61%) and Law and Justice (55%). 54% of respondents supported the Movement, with 30% deeming it decisively good and 24% a rather good initiative, with 34% being against. The Polish news magazine Polityka has described the ROG as a paramilitary organisation and refuted the group's stated intention of stopping mass-migration across the border with Poland. The magazine claimed that in 2024 just 10,000 people were transferred back to Poland from Germany across the border. However, research published by the Digital Forensic Research Lab (DFRLab) stated that in 2024, 688 migrants were repatriated to Poland from Germany whilst a further 9,369 migrants were refused entry into Germany from Poland. The figures cited were largely made up of Ukrainian nationals. The DFRLab has described the ROG as part of a broader online misinformation campaign designed to radicalise people into far-right beliefs.

== Legal issues ==
The ROG's founder Bąkiewicz, has faced prosecution under Polish law for an incident in which he insulted officials of the SG in the border town of Słubice. He was also charged with defamation and inciting racial hatred.

== See also ==
- Minuteman Civil Defense Corps
