= Robert Bąkiewicz =

Polish politician (born 1976)

- Bąkiewicz in 2026

Leader of the Border Defence Movement
- Incumbent
- Assumed office 27 March 2025
- Preceded by: Position established

President of the Independence March Association
- In office 2017–2023
- Preceded by: Witold Tumanowicz
- Succeeded by: Bartosz Malewski

Personal details
- Born: 2 May 1976 (age 50) Pruszków, Warsaw Capital Voivodeship, Polish People's Republic
- Party: Independence (since 2024)
- Other political affiliations: Sovereign Poland (2023–2024)
- Education: Ryszard Łazarski Higher School of Commerce and Law

Robert Bąkiewicz (born 2 May 1976) is a Polish far-right politician and activist who founded and leads the Border Defence Movement. From 2017 to 2023, he served as president of the Independence March Association.

== Biography ==
=== Early life ===
Bąkiewicz was born and raised in the Żbików area of Pruszków. He attended the local primary school and joined the youth team of the local football side Znicz Pruszków, although his coach later recalled that Bąkiewicz wasn't particularly talented. As a youth, Bąkiewicz was a self-described dresiarz, and would later try to associate his younger self with the Pruszków mafia, although associates have claimed this as a self-aggrandising fantasy. After leaving school, Bąkiewicz enrolled at the Ryszard Łazarski Higher School of Commerce and Law, however he left before graduating.

=== Politics ===
In 2017, Bąkiewicz created the YouTube channel Media Narodowe. As of 2022, it had 250 thousand subscribers. He founded the TV station TV Media Narodowe in 2023 and served as its president until 2024.

In 2019, he founded the Rota Independence March Association. In 2020, he founded the National Guard. In 2023, he founded the Pod Wierzbami Foundation. In March 2025, he founded the Border Defence Movement.

In the 2018 local elections, Bąkiewicz was a candidate for mayor of Pruszków. In 2023, he joined Sovereign Poland. In the 2023 parliamentary election, he was a candidate for the Sejm on the Law and Justice list in Radom. In 2024, he founded the political party Independence.

=== Personal life ===
Bąkiewicz is a self-professed devout Christian and Lefebvrist. He married his childhood sweetheart, Sylwia, with whom he has four children. In April 2011 the couple divorced.

== Criminal activities ==
In 2023, he was convicted of having violated the bodily integrity of activist Katarzyna Augustynek during a 2020 women's strike protest. However, in 2025, he was pardoned by president Andrzej Duda.
