= Polish material losses during World War II =

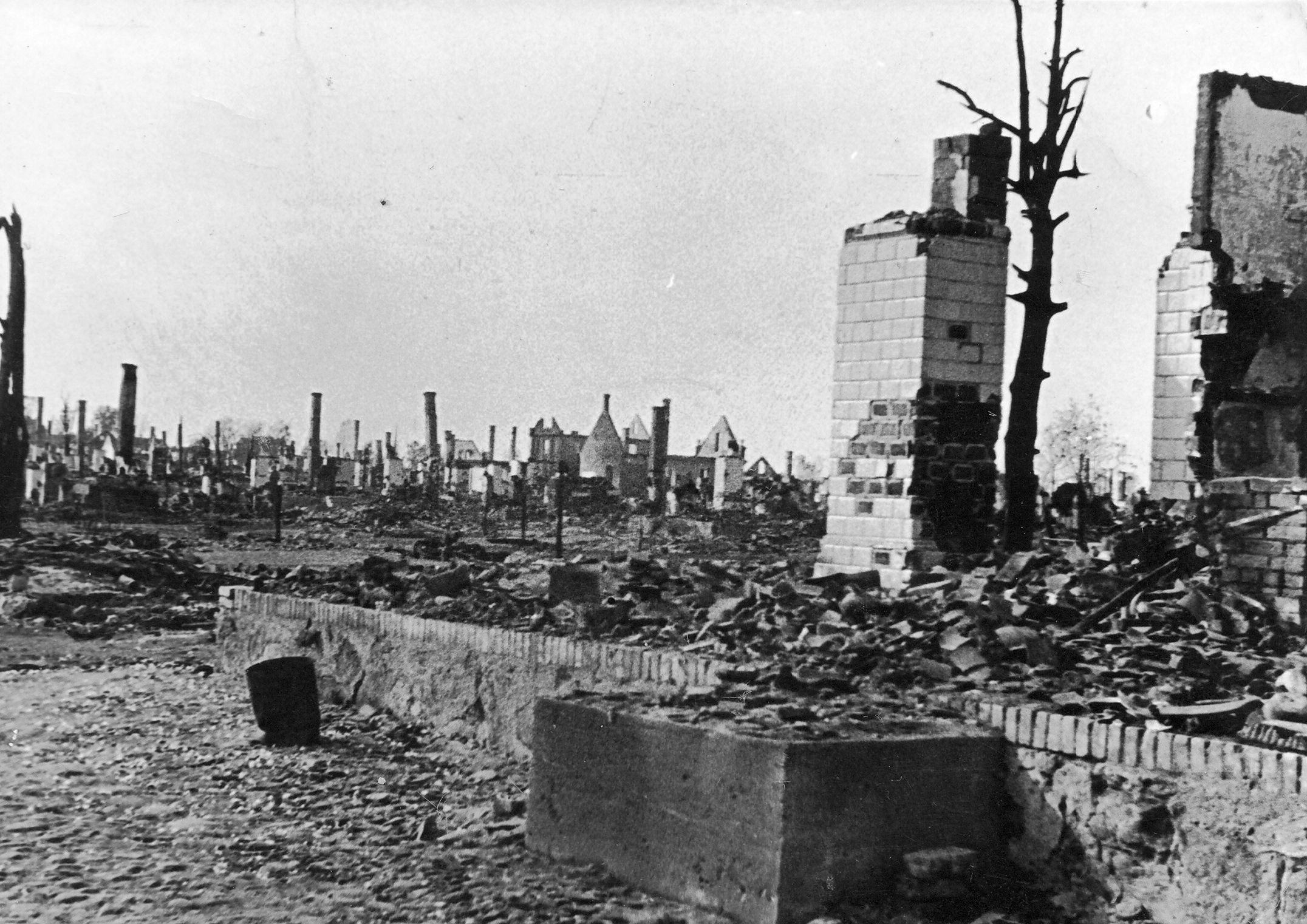
A destroyed Polish village, Sucha

Polish material losses during World War II - are losses suffered by the Second Polish Republic and its inhabitants during World War II.

During World War II, Poland incurred the greatest biological (for every 1000 inhabitants, she lost 220 people) and material losses (with an average $626 U.S. Dollar loss per inhabitant, compared to Yugoslavia's $601). In 1946, during the International Reparations Conference in Paris, Poland's material losses were evaluated to be $16,9 billion U.S. Dollars, $9,1 billion in Yugoslavia. Two-fifths of Poland's cultural property was destroyed. Due to the World Powers (It was hidden from Poland until the last moment), Poland was forced to hand-over 48% of its territory to the Soviet Union, equating to 178 000 km² of land. Most material losses were as a result of the German invader, others that of the responsibility of the USSR.

== Material losses under German occupation ==
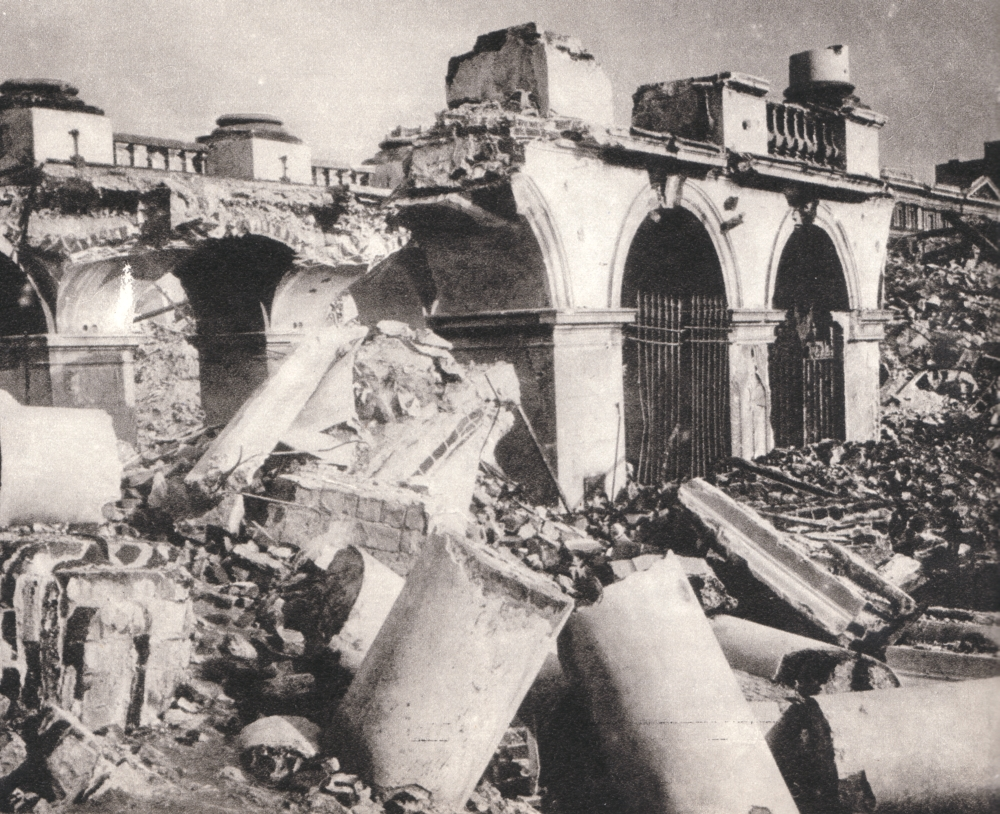
Saxon Palace, destroyed by Germans in December 1944

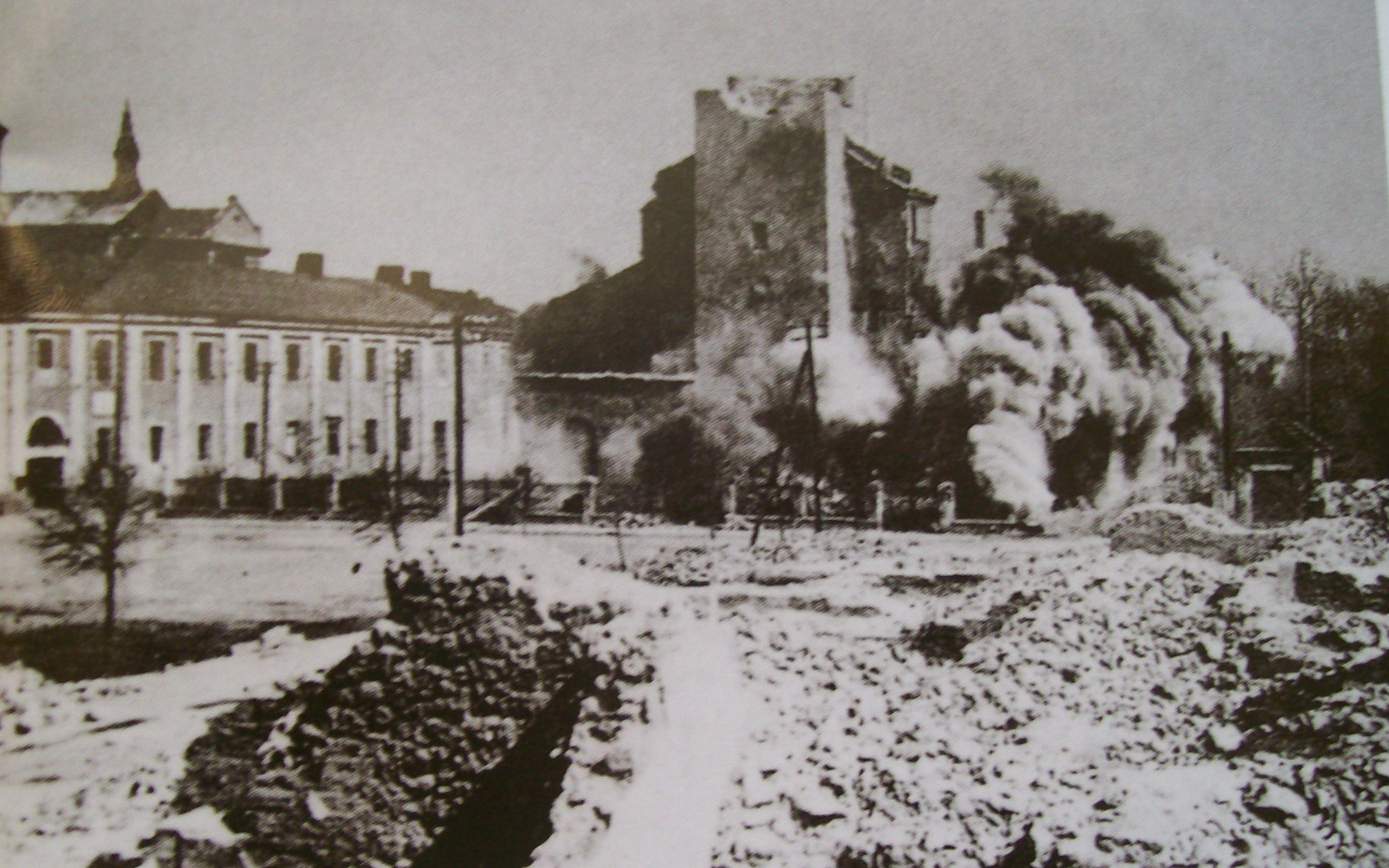
Thirteenth-century St. Michael Archangel's Church in Wieluń, blasted by Germans in 1940

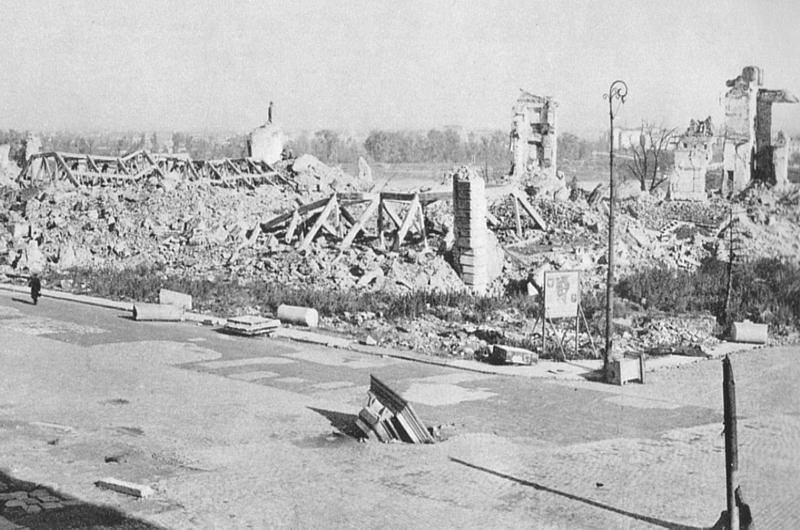
Ruins of the Royal Castle in Warsaw

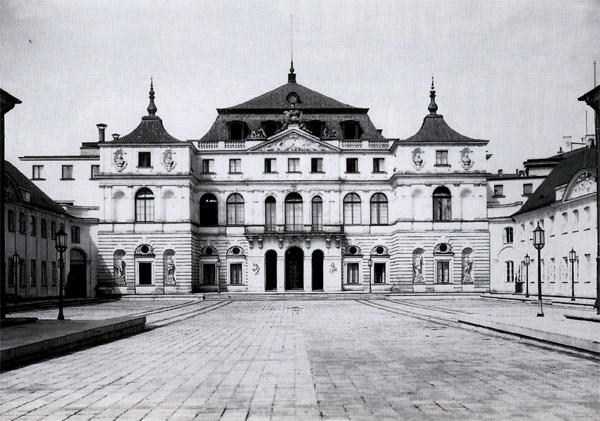
Brühl Palace in Warsaw

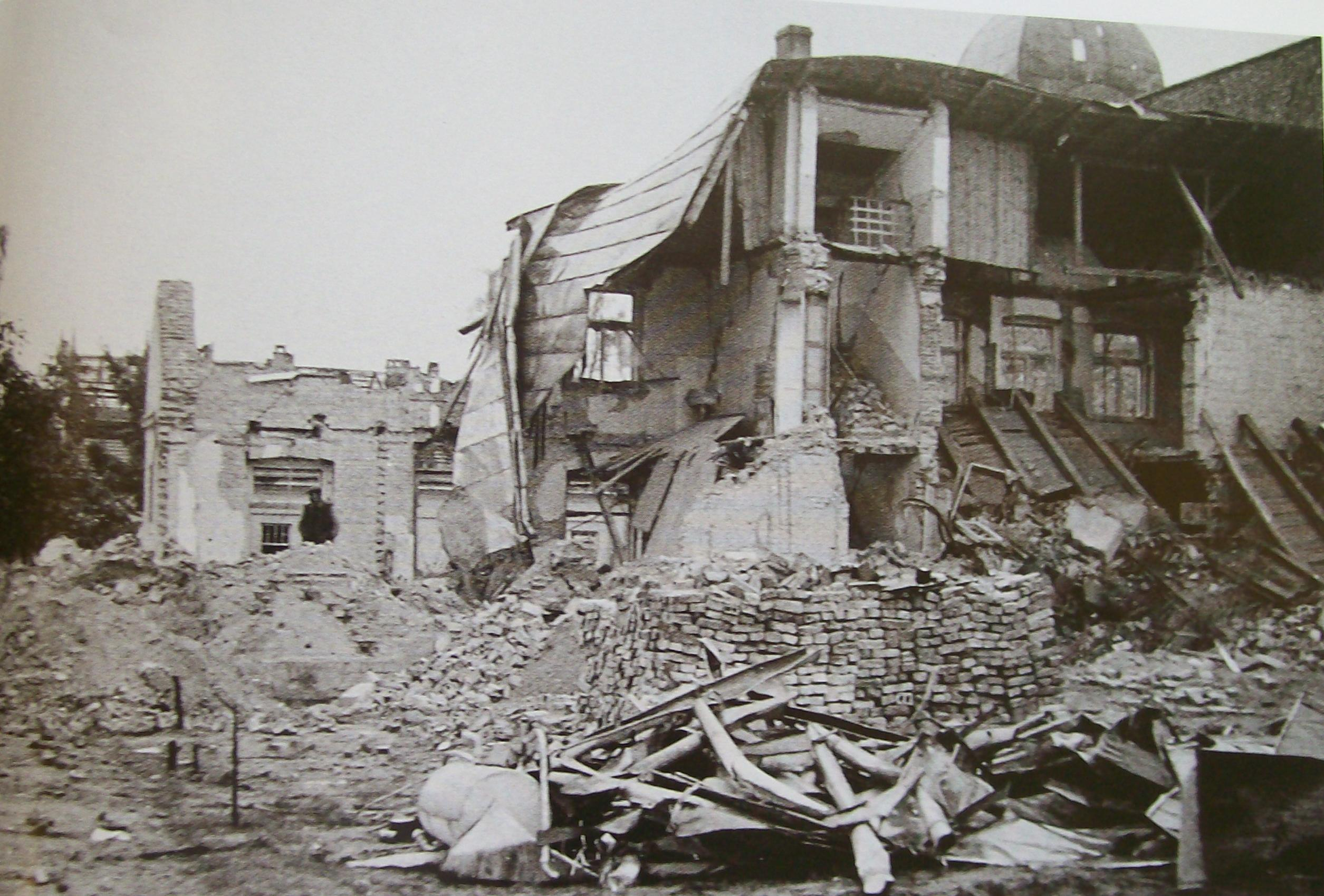
The aftermath of the bombing of Wieluń. Some 70-75% of the town was destroyed in 1939.

Material losses endured by Poland under the German occupant can be subdivided into several categories:

- Losses as a result of warfare and resultant destruction,
- Losses as a result of loot and confiscation of property via the occupier,
- Losses as a result of ransack exploitation of the economy and slave labour of the populace.

In 1947, the postwar Bureau of Reparations during the Presidium of the Council of Ministers (Sprawozdanie Biura Odszkodowań Wojennych w przedmiocie strat i szkód wojennych Polski 1939–1945) assessed loss of life, national capital and culture:

- Loss of national capital - 38% in relation to the pre-1939 state (the greatest destruction by the occupant was in the scope of industry and urban areas).
- Loss of property - residential buildings (162 190), agricultural granges (353 876), factories and industrial complexes (14 000), private sector and state shops (199 751), workshops (84 436), 968 223 households.
- Destruction of urban areas and towns - war losses of Warsaw - 85% of the city matter, 90% of industry, 72% of housing, 90% of cultural and landmarks, 700 000 deaths (i.e. the United Kingdom and American wartime population loss combined). Total destruction and loot of the Warsaw Ghetto in 1943, 95% loss, Jasło (96%) and the destruction of the Port of Gdynia.
- Loot of cultural artifacts - 43% en masse. Destructtion of 25 museums, 35 theatres, 665 cinemas, 323 community centres. Although it is difficult to estimate museum losses, library losses amount to 66%. The irreversible destruction of 22 mil. books. Collectively, the German occupant ransacked 516 000 individual pieces of art, with an estimated worth of 15,46 bil. U.S. Dollars (2017 rate). Due to postwar vindication, only a small fragment of cultural artifacts, works of art and exhibits were recovered.
- Loss in Polish education - destruction of 17 institutes of higher education, 271 secondary schools, 4880 common schools and 768 other schools. Additionally, the destruction of research institutes, scientific societies and other types of foundations.
- Loss of healthcare services (hospital properties, infrastructure, buildings) - 55% in relation to the pre-1939 state. Destruction of 352 hospitals, 29 anti-tuberculosis sanatoriums, 47 insurance societies, 778 health centres and out-patients' clinics, 1450 doctor and dental clinics.
- Loss in industry (purposeful destruction and loot of machines and appliances) - 64.5% of chemical, 64.3% of printing, 59.7% of electro-technical, 55.4% of clothing, 53.1% of food and 48.0% of metal industry pillaged or looted.
- Loss in forestry as a result of the seizure of national capital - 75 mil. m³ of trees cut down, equating to 400 000 hectares of forest.
- Loss in agriculture and cultivation - 1908 thousand horses, 3905 thousand cattle, 4988 thousand swine and 755 thousand sheep.
- Destruction of over 50% of railway, road, sea and air transport infrastructure. Destruction of telecommunications infrastructure (destruction of 13 radio reception stations, 7 radio telegraph stations, confiscation of 867 000 radio receivers). The loot or destruction of 2465 locomotives, 6250 rail carriages, 83 636 rail transport wagons, 25 sea ships and 39 close-shore port ships. The destruction of 5948 km of railway tracks, 47 767 metres of railway bridges and viaducts, 14 900 km of hard-surface roads, 15 500 km of road bridges.

The Bureau of Reparations during the Presidium of the Council of Ministers estimated the total cost of material losses amounted after the end of World War II that took place between 1939 and 1945.

Conclusively, the material losses and destruction was valued at 258 billion prewar zlotys, which amount to 50 billion US Dollars (1939 rate). In relation to the 2017, the aforesaid US dollar transfers to US$850–920 billion. As such, Poland's capital city of Warsaw suffered US$60 billion in war losses.

== Material losses under Soviet occupation ==
In September, 1939 the Soviet Union occupied the eastern voivodeships of Poland. During World War II, the occupied territory was annexed and ceded to the Soviet republic of: Ukrainian SSR, Byelorussian SSR and the Lithuanian Soviet Socialist Republic. The annexation of this part of Poland was accepted at the Tehran and Yalta Conference. As a result, under the pressure of world powers, Poland was forced to cede the Soviet Union 48% of its territory, equating to the loss of 178,000 km² of land, gaining the equivalent of 101 000 km² in the west. The modification of Poland's borders by the United Kingdom and the United States of America was a direct violation of the Atlantic Charter.

After World War II, the Polish state did not assess the material losses incited by the USSR on Polish territory between 1939 and 1945. Due to the de facto occupation of Poland by the Soviet Union, the Bureau of Reparations during the Presidium of the Council of Ministers (Sprawozdanie Biura Odszkodowań Wojennych w przedmiocie strat i szkód wojennych Polski 1939–1945) did not take these losses into consideration.

== Loss of intelligentsia ==
In concentration camps, 135 higher education employees were killed, 80 in the Warsaw Uprising, 163 scientists in public executions (including 67 in Warsaw and 52 in Lwów), and 44 intellectuals in the Katyń Massacre. In respect to the largest intellectual centres in Poland, the largest losses were found in Warsaw - 276 taughts intellects, Kraków - 114, Poznań - 102, Lwów - 95 and in Wilno, 27 scientists.
