= Citizens patrol =

Citizens patrol is policing based on the concept that police officers and private citizens work together to solve community related problems. Some problems include crime, safety, fear, and neighborhood decay. Many forms of Citizens Patrol have been in the U.S. for quite some time. Most civilian patrols are extensions of regular police patrols controlled and sanctioned by the police.

== History ==
The start of some form of citizens patrol groups dates back all the way to the Middle Ages of England. In the Middle Ages there were people were called Frankpledge. The Frankpledge were males who were part of the tithing whose responsibility was the good conduct of others.

In early colonial America, night watch groups were formed in the Thirteen Colonies. In the Southern Colonies, white men formed slave patrol groups who were responsible for controlling, returning and punishing runaway enslaved people. In the 1800s change was forced due to how American Society was changing. Both the night watchers in the North and the Slave Patrol in the South evolved into modern police organizations.

An example of a specific group that was formed in the United States that support citizen patrol in the US include the forming of the Texas Rangers in 1823. Stephen F. Austin who was known as the "Father of Texas" at the time had 600–700 people living in Texas which he then called together and organized a group called the "Rangers". All of this was intended because he had no army at the time and needed some sort of protection.

== Big citizens patrol groups now ==
=== Citizens on Patrol ===
The Citizens on Patrol Program is a program of the National Sheriffs Association that trains community volunteers to improve public safety. It was founded in 1999 and has roughly 75,000 volunteers nationwide. Agencies around the United States may use their volunteers differently.

=== National Neighborhood Watch Program ===
The National Neighborhood Watch program began in 1972 with funding from the National Sheriffs Association. The National Neighborhood Watch has worked to unite enforcement agencies, private organizations and with individuals citizens to prevent crime. The National Neighborhood Watch is the nation's premier crime prevention and community mobilization program.

=== Volunteer in Police Services ===
The Volunteer in Police Services is a program that provides volunteer assistance to local police. The program is managed by the International Association of Chiefs of Police which is directly related to the White House Office of the USA Freedom Corps and the Bureau of Justice Assistance. This program is a logical expansion to allow citizens to work more closely to law enforcement.

== Effects of citizens patrol ==
Due to increasing crime rates, many states have incorporated a citizens patrol program to decrease crime in cities. Research has shown that there are more than 800 patrols that are currently active and most have been initiated since 1970. Patrols are carefully selected and well trained. They work as a positive contact for local police which lead police to be more likely to succeed. Citizen patrol is also used as a problem solving tool to prevent crime. With more people watching communities it leads to a safer environment. Citizens Patrol now act as extension for law enforcement. It is used for the informal mechanisms of social control. The patrols tend to enhance the status of police and existing police practices. Research has not proven that patrols decrease crime rates but considerable values exist in having people participate in common efforts to fight community problems.
