= LGBTQ movements in Poland =

The LGBTQ movements in Poland are social movements working in the interest of the rights of Lesbian, gay, bisexual, transgender, and queer people in the Polish society. While some organizations focus on equal rights, such as legalization of civil unions and same-sex marriage, others focus on self-help and self acceptance or queer liberation, like the American gay liberation movement of the 60s and 70s. The earliest initiatives related to the rights of the Polish members of the LGBTQ community emerged in the 70s and 80s.

As of 2023, 54% of the Polish society believed in marriage equality. This number rose from 46% back in 2020.

== Polish People's Republic ==
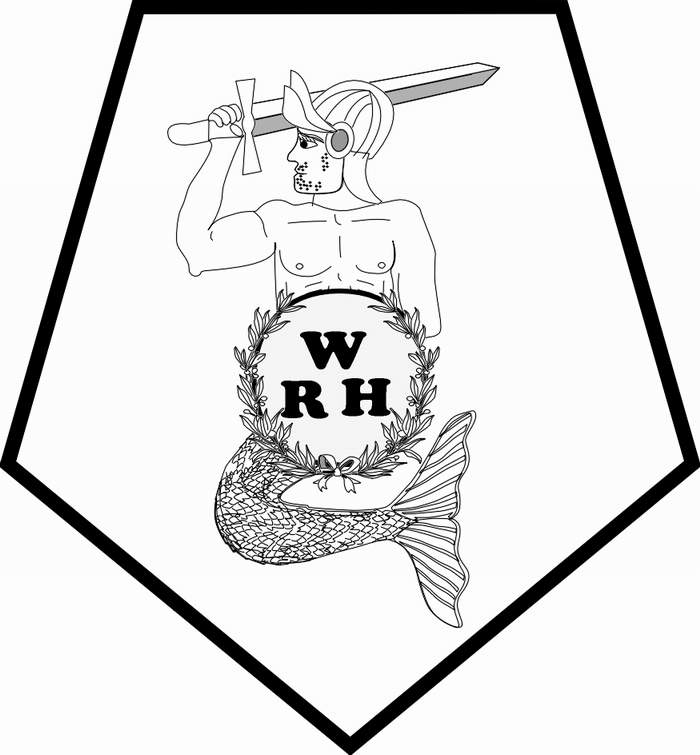
The Warsaw Homosexual Movement symbol – a male mermaid holding a shield with the letters WRH (Warszawski Ruch Gejowski)

In the 1970s, though gay movements began to grow more active in Western Europe and some Eastern Bloc countries, such as East Germany and the Soviet Union, the Polish gay subculture remained politically passive. This is attributed to the influence of Catholicism on Polish society and same-sex sexual relations not being criminalized. The roots of the gay rights movement in Poland can be found in the letters written to Western gay organizations, such as HOSI Wien in Austria, as well as the reactions to the AIDS crisis. In 1982, HOSI Wien created a subunit dedicated to Eastern Europe, EEIP - Eastern Europe Information Pool, which contacted and helped new, smaller queer organizations in the region. Their activity also caught the attention of the International Lesbian, Gay, Bisexual, Trans and Intersex Association (ILGA), which was dominated by Western organizations unaware of the state of things in Eastern Europe. Andrzej Selerowicz, working together with EEIP, hosted conspiratorial meetings of queer people in 1983 and 1984. Despite the fact that many of the guests felt shame when it came to speaking up about LGBT issues, these meetings were a starting point of new initiatives, such as new groups and a queer magazine Etap.

As a result of Operation Hyacinth, during a private meeting in 1987 a new initiative started, which later became the Warsaw Homosexual Movement (WRH). The founding members were Waldemar Zboralski, Sławomir Starosta and Krzysztof Garwatowski. At first the members were only homosexual men, but a month after its creation lesbians began to join as well.

The first activities of WRH focused on safe sex, AIDS prevention, and promoting HIV testing. The Polish media and the Ministry of Health were positive, unlike the reaction of general Czesław Kiszczak, who prevented the official registration of the Warsaw Homosexual Movement. He justified it with the concern of transgressing the rule of public morality and the anticipated reaction of the Catholic Church.

The Warsaw Homosexual Movement was mentioned twice under this translated name in the reports of Radio Free Europe/Radio Liberty about independent organizations working in Polish People's Republic, compiled by Jiří Pehe, their Central Europe political analyst, in 1988 and 1989.

== Third Polish Republic ==
On October 28, 1989, Lambda Groups Association was created, later registered by a voivodeship court in Warsaw on February 23, 1990. It was the first registered LGBT organization in Poland. Its priorities were spreading acceptance, awareness and HIV prevention. Because of the AIDS crisis, in spring of 1990 Jarosław Ender and Sławomir Starosta started a campaign called Kochaj, nie zabijaj (eng. Love, don't kill), to help spread awareness about AIDS among young people.

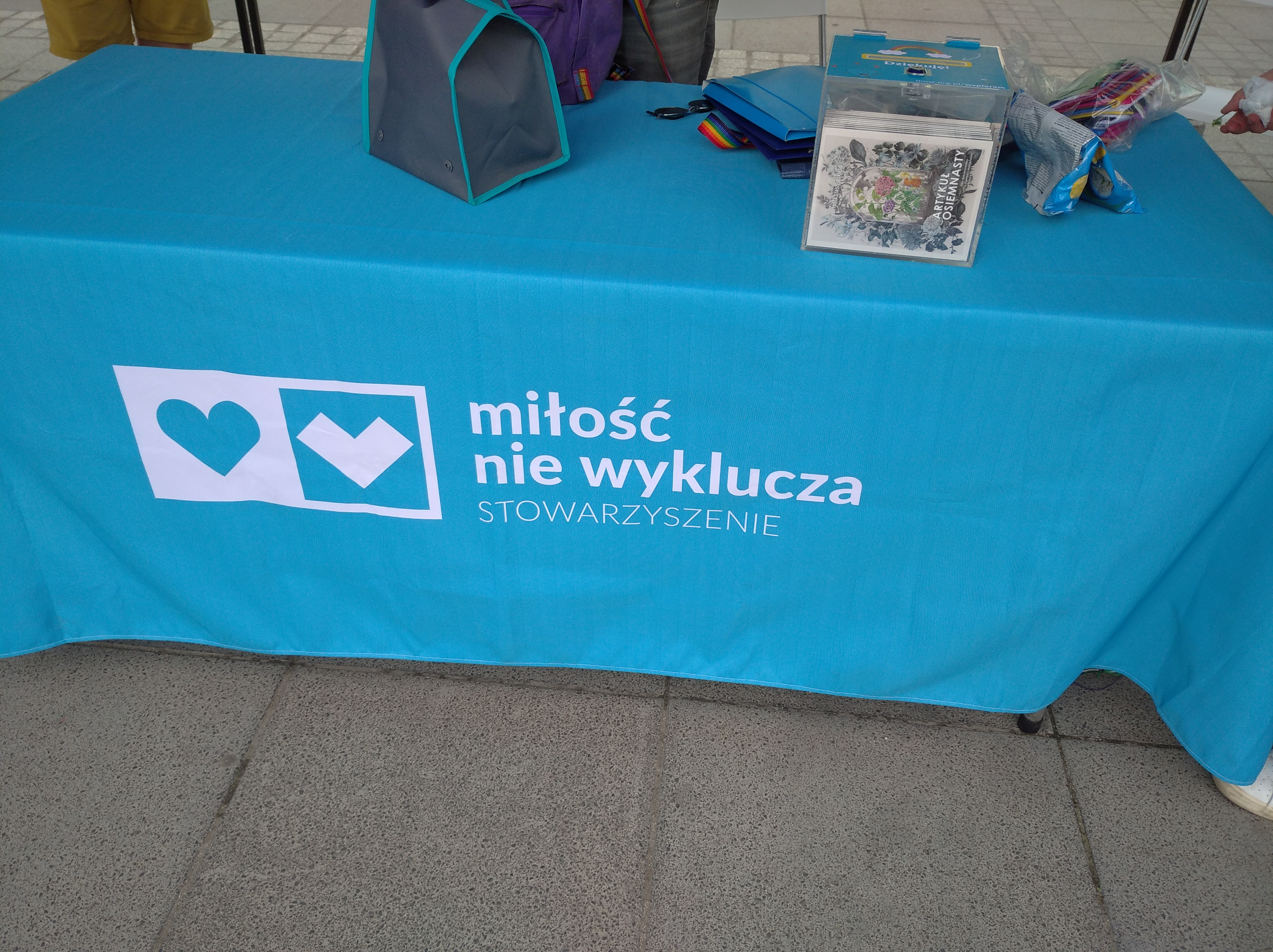
Miłość Nie Wyklucza stand at the Equality March 2020 in Wrocław

On February 14, 1993, a demonstration was held in the center of Warsaw, appealing for "the right to love," which was the first LGBT demonstration in Poland. In 1998, there was a happening in which queer Poles, including the activist Szymon Niemiec, were holding placards with their first and last names while wearing masks. In spring 1995 Polish immigrants in New York established the organization Razem ("Together"), helping Polish LGBT immigrants make contact with each other and with integration. Razem was part of Lesbian & Gay Community Services Center. In 1996, inspired by Olga Stefania, the OLA-Archive (Ogólnopolskie Feministyczne Archiwum Lesbijskie, eng. All-Poland Feminist Lesbian Archive) was made and registered in 1998. During the 1997-2000 period, OLA published 8 issues of a lesbian and feminist literary magazine Furia Pierwsza (eng. First fury). The first website of the gay community, Inna strona (eng. The other side), was made in September 1996. The name was later changed to Queer.pl, which it still works under today. In the same year a lesbian site called Polish Lesbians' Site was created. In 1998 the first Tęczowe Laury (eng. The Rainbow Laurels) event was held, where awards were given for the promotion of tolerance and respect of LGBT people. Jarosław Ender and Sławomir Starosta were the originators. Some of the awarded include: Kora, Zofia Kuratowska, Monika Olejnik, Jerzy Jaskiernia and the newspaper Gazeta Wyborcza.

In 2001 the first Pride Parade was held in Warsaw, with more than 300 people attending. It was the first large protest against the discrimination of LGBT people in Poland. In the same year, Campaign Against Homophobia was established. They were responsible for the social-and-artist campaign Let Them See Us from 2003, the first one of the kind related to LGBT issues.

In 2004 and 2005 the Warsaw municipality didn't allow for Pride Parades to take place, justifying it by the concern of a counterdemonstration and possible dates of the parades being on religious and national holidays. The contemporary mayor of Warsaw, Lech Kaczyński, and the PiS party he was a member of, stated that allowing for such an event to take place would promote the "homosexual lifestyle". In protest of this position in September 2004 another event was held in Warsaw, Wiec Wolności (eng. The Freedom Rally), with 600-1000 people attending. In response to the 2005 ban, around 2500 people attended an illegal demonstration (as an act of civil disobedience) on June 11, which ended with a few detentions.

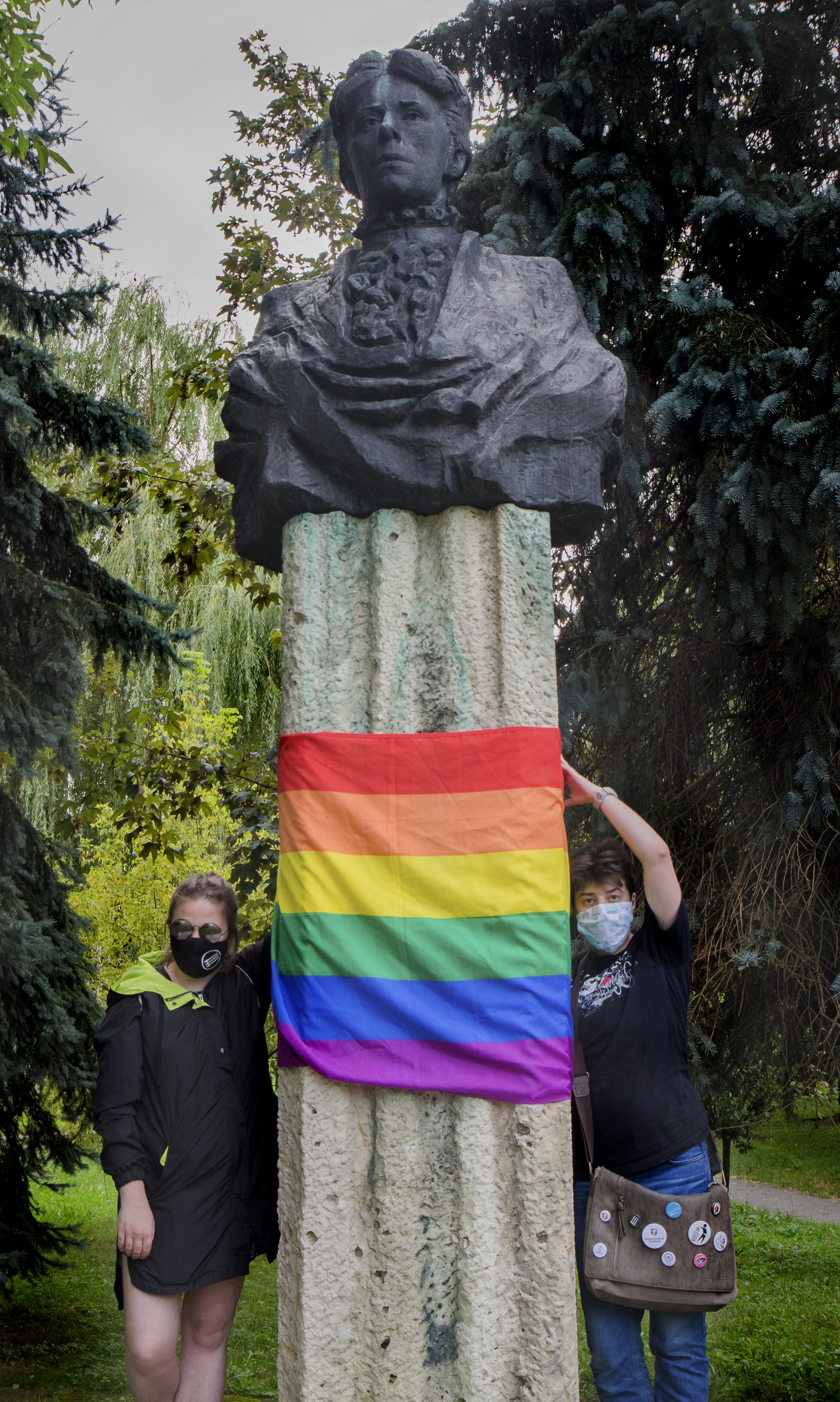
LGBT activists hanging a rainbow flag on the monument of Maria Konopnicka in Kraków during the Polish Stonewall 2020.

In 2009, Miłość Nie Wyklucza (eng. Love Doesn't Exclude) was established, focusing on the legalization of same-sex marriage. It began its informative, educational and lobbying operations regarding the legalization of civil unions for both same-sex and opposite-sex couples. In 2013, it was officially registered and became the first LGBT organization demanding marriage equality for same-sex couples.

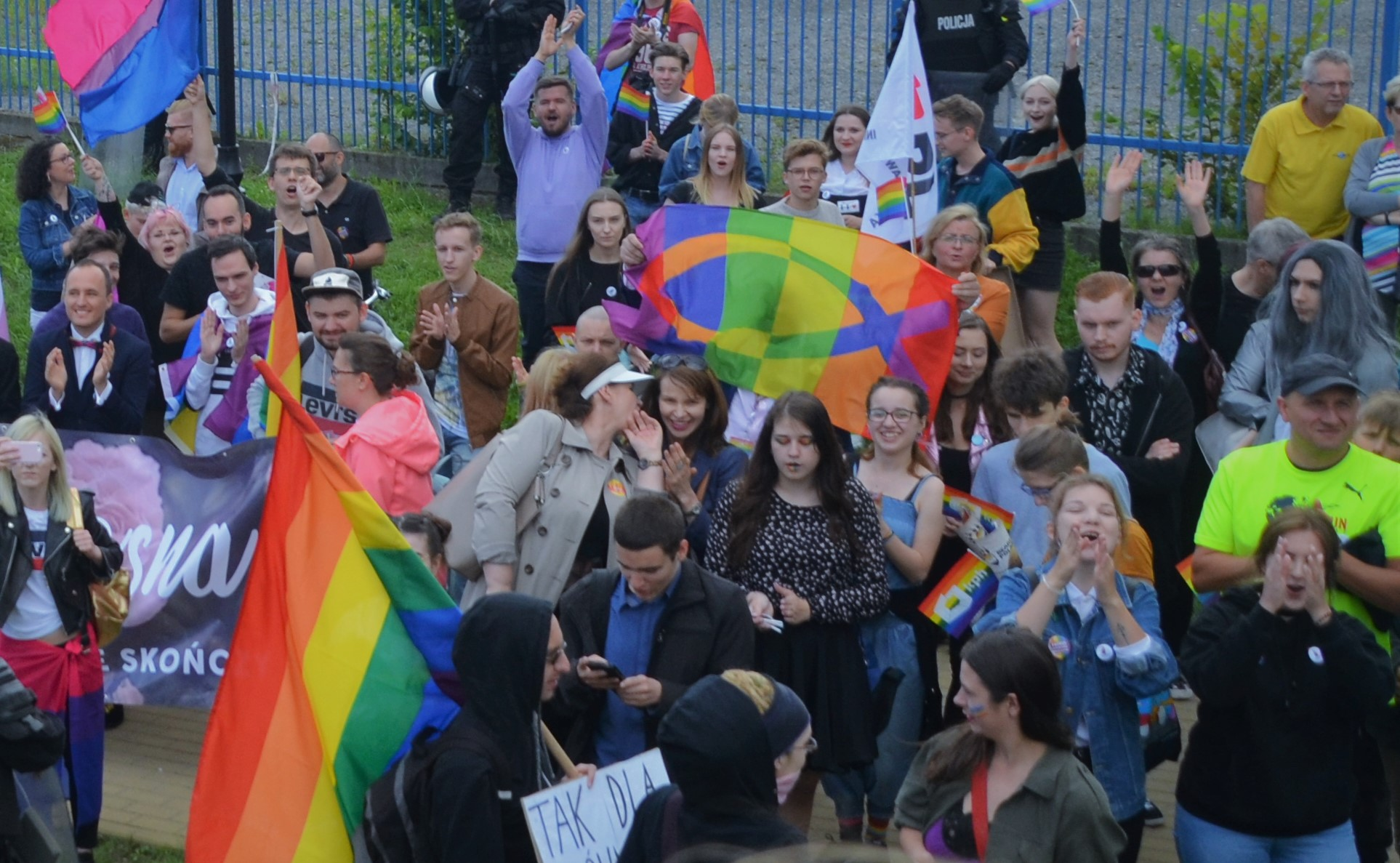
Foundation Wiara i Tęcza during a demonstration

In 2010 the Polish Christian LGBTQ group Wiara i Tęcza (eng. Fate and Rainbow) was established, focused on Christian gay men, lesbians, bisexual and transgender people. It later created a policy document, gained legal personality in August 17, 2018, and was registered as Fundacja Wiara i Tęcza (eng. Foundation Fate and Rainbow). The group organized Przystań Pielgrzyma LGBT (eng. LGBT Pilgrim Haven) during World Youth Day. In 2016, Wiara i Tęcza, KPH and Stowarzyszenie na rzecz osób LGBT Tolerado organized a campaign Przekażmy sobie znak pokoju (eng. Let us offer each other a sign of peace), which clubs of Christian magazines also engaged in, as well as some publicists of these magazines. The point of the campaign was to change the attitude of Christians to the LGBTQ community and raising awareness, that they need to be spoken about with respect.

In may 2019 Stop Bullshit (Polish: Stop Bzdurom) collective was established, as a counter to the activity of the Pro Foundation (Polish: Fundacja Pro), whose volunteers were gathering signatures under a civil proposal of a legal act called Stop Pedofilii (eng. Stop Pedophilia). The proposal included harsher punishments for pedophilic acts, however it classified sexual education as one of them. The collective initially organized a series of dancing events in front of the stands of Fundacja Pro. These sparked the interest of a larger public audience, which let the collective continue its efforts; a webpage and a Facebook fanpage were made, dismantling the information shared by Fundacja Pro. Informative leaflets were printed and given away, explaining what sexual education and some of the related terms. The collective was involved in many different educational actions in support of the LGBTQ community in Poland. In June 2020, during the presidential campaign period, the collective organized an event in front of the Presidential Palace in Warsaw called Prowakacja ideologii LGBT (eng. Provocation of the LGBT ideology), which was a response to the words of president Andrzej Duda, who said during a rally in Brzeg that LGBT aren't people, but an ideology.

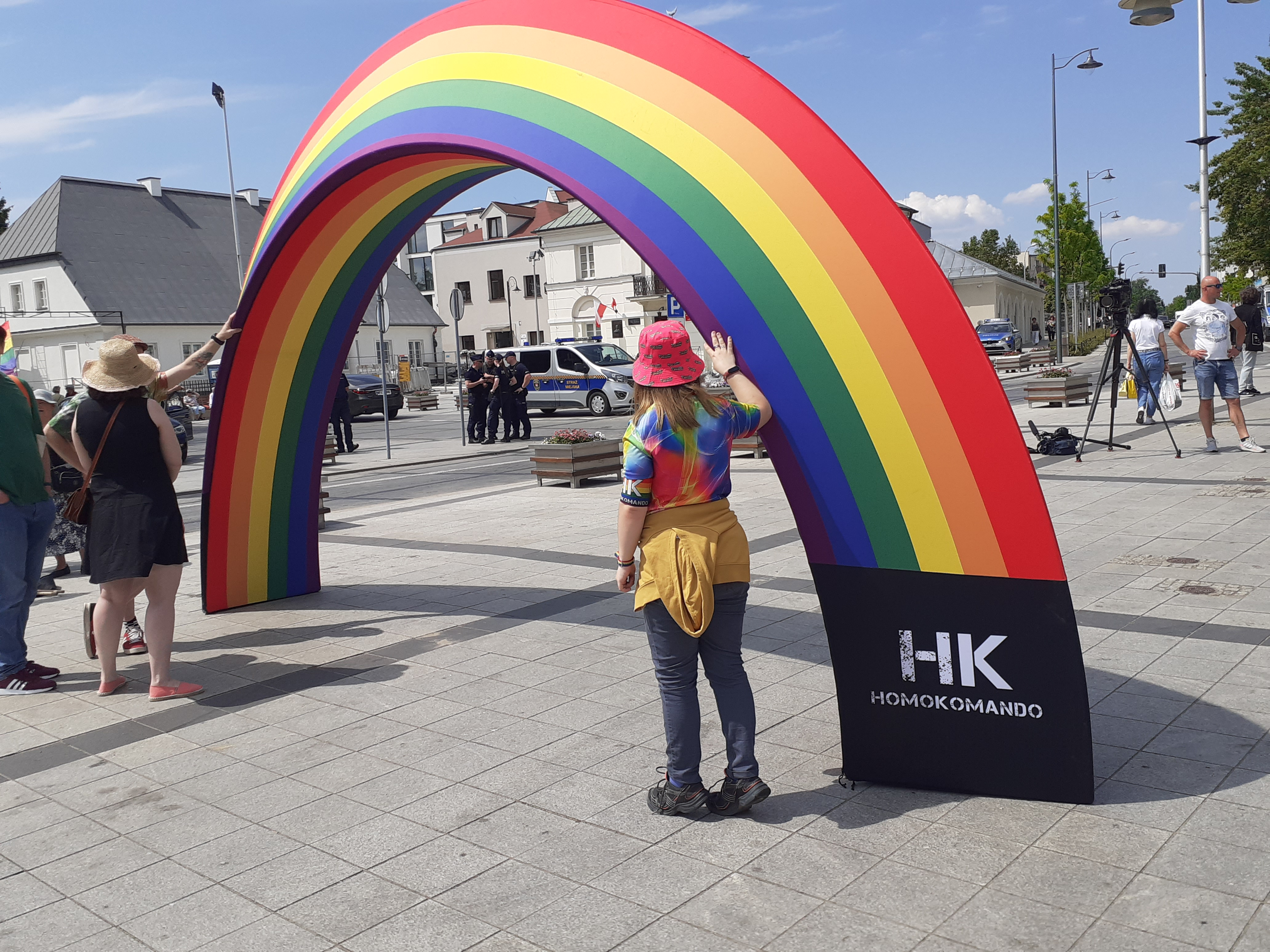
The rainbow of the Homokomando association, put up during an equality march in Piaseczno (2023)

On the night of 28 to the 29 July, collectives Stop Bullshit, Gang Samzamęt and Poetka organized an act of civil disobedience, which involved hanging rainbow flags on Warsaw's statues. Next to all of them, manifestos were left, while some also had pink scarves with queer anarchism symbol on them. The targeted statues were Józef Piłsudski Monument, Nicolaus Copernicus Monument, Jesus Christ Monumement, Wincenty Witos Monument, as well as the Mermaid Monument. On August 7, 2020, 47 people were arrested during an event later dubbed Tęczowa Noc (eng. The Rainbow Night). Some of the attendees were arrested for peacefully protesting the arrest of a collective member, Margot Szutowicz, while others were simply passing by near the place of the protest. The Commissioner for Human Rights criticized the police for breaking the human rights of the arrested.

Queer people in Poland fight for equality through the legal system, for example by challenging the legislation that limits their rights, such as the case of Andersen v. Poland.

== See also ==
- LGBTQ history in Poland
- LGBTQ rights in Poland
