= Warsaw Homosexual Movement =

Polish LGBT social organization, 1987–88

- Warszawski Ruch Homoseksualny
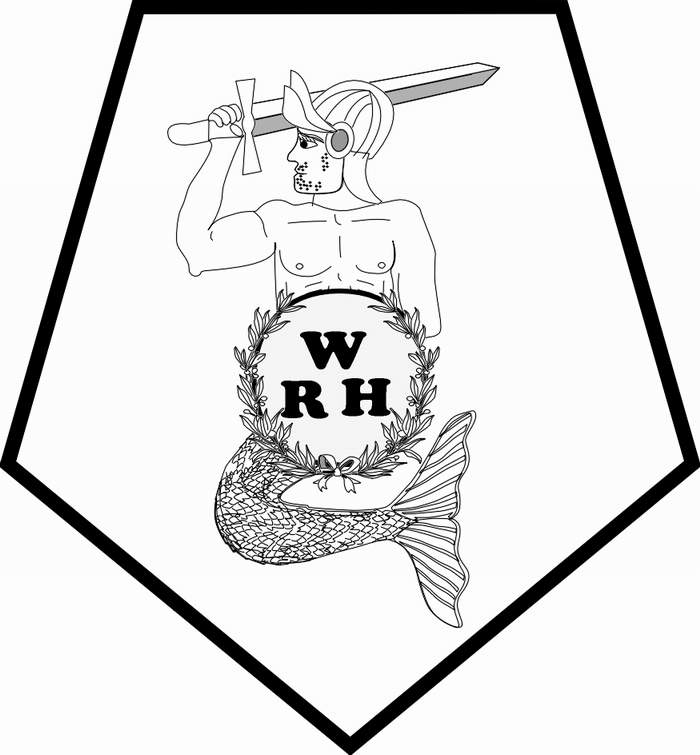
- Abbreviation: WRH
- Successor: Lambda Groups Association
- Formation: 1987
- Founder: Waldemar Zboralski, Sławomir Starosta, Krzysztof Garwatowski
- Founded at: Warsaw
- Dissolved: 1988
- Type: Non-governmental
- Legal status: Communist Poland refused to register the organization
- Purpose: Homosexual rights activism
- Location: Warsaw, Poland

The Warsaw Homosexual Movement (Polish: Warszawski Ruch Homoseksualny; WRH) was an independent group of gays and lesbians which existed in Warsaw between January 1987 and summer 1988. The government of the Polish People's Republic refused the group's registration to become an NGO.

The group's founders were Waldemar Zboralski, a male nurse from Railways Hospital (Polish: Szpital Kolejowy), Sławomir Starosta, a student of the University of Warsaw, and Krzysztof Garwatowski, a student at the Warsaw University of Technology. They were supported by a group of students and workers of a few universities in Warsaw and young journalists from the capital.

During a meeting on 24 January 1987, in a private flat on Gabriel Narutowicz Square in Warsaw, several individuals decided to create an official organization of gays and lesbians. On 20 March 1987 in Milanówek in the Warsaw region, there was an establishment meeting of WHR, during which its name was chosen, as was legal basic and choosing its leadership (which was necessary in order to register the organization). The leader chosen was Waldemar Zboralski, and the chosen logo of the group was a modified coat of arms of Warsaw: a male merman with a shield, on which was written "WRH". Jiří Pehe, a political analyst for Radio Free Europe who specialized in Central Europe, mentioned the group in his 1988 and 1989 reports on independent organizations working in the Polish People's Republic.

== Support ==
Until they attempted to register for official NGO status, WRH mounted a broad informational campaign in the whole of Poland. This included reaching out to well-known periodicals of the time, including Polityka, Przegląd Tygodniowy, Wprost, Na Przełaj, Radar, Express Wieczorny, Pana, Sztandar Młodych, and Kurier Polski. In 1987 and 1988 they were able to present a WRH program in a few radio auditions and had some TV appearances (Rozmowy Intymne (pol. "Intimate Talks") with Halszka Wasilewska).

The activities of WRH, particularly declarations made by members about fighting AIDS, drew the interest and support of the Ministry of Health.

The movement was also supported by psychologist and professor Mikałaj Kozakiewicz, who was then a chief of Towarzystwo Rozwoju Rodziny (pol. Society of Family Development), and a number of his intellectual friends, all of whom tried to convince the then-communist ruling class of the Polish People's Republic that the organization was beneficial. Many of the supporters signed a letter to contemporary Minister of Foreign Affairs gen. Czesław Kiszczak, which was dated 5 March 1988. It was signed by Tadeusz Kielanowski, Bolesław Popielski, Kazimierz Imieliński, Zbigniew Sternadel, prof. Bogdan Suchodolski, Stanisław Ehrlich, prof. Jan Szczepański, Artur Sandauer, Jerzy Kawalerowicz, Szymon Kobyliński, and Daniel Passent.

The government of Warsaw district Mokatów gave the group premises by the Piaseczyńska Street for an office, which served as an official headquarters of the WRH and was used for hosting regular meetings.

== Cooperation with other LGBT organizations ==
From its inception, WHM was supported by the international gay and lesbian movement and ILGA. Direct support was provided by Austria's ILGA member, HOSI-Wien, whom Andrzej Selerowicz had been in contact with since 1985. HOSI-Wien paid WHM's fees for ILGA and the group became a member in April 1988. In its activities, Warsaw Homosexual Movement closely cooperated with other groups of gays and lesbians in Poland, such as Group ETAP from Wrocław and Filo from Gdańsk.

In May 1987, members of WRH took part in ILGA conferences organized in Cologne and London. Warsaw Homosexual Movement became an official part of ILGA in 1087,, before the failed legalization of the organization in Poland. On 16 April 1988, there was organized an international conference of ILGA with participants from West Germany, East Germany, Hungary, Denmark, the US, Canada and Austria.

== Attempt at registration ==
After gathering 15 people, determined to provide their personal data in the registration form of an organization (some of them were the victims of Operation Hyacinth in 1985-1987), on 24 April 1988 in the Capital City of Warsaw the establishing forms were put down, including the organization's statute. Because of political decision of the at-the-time minister of internal affairs, general Czesław Kiszczak, the registration of Warsaw Homosexual Movement was denied. The decision was supported by fears about the organization's breaking "rules of public morality", and by fears of reaction of the Catholic Church.

== End of operations ==
In 1989, some people involved with WRH, together with members of informal groups of gays and lesbians working in other cities of Poland, attempted again to register an LGBT organization. The attempt was successful and on 23 February 1990 Lambda Groups Association was established as a nation-wide organization of gays and lesbians.

== Publications about WRH ==
- 2009 HomoWarszawa, Przewodnik kulturalno-historyczny, joint publication, Wydawnictwo Abiekt.pl, Warszawa, p. 156-159, ISBN 978-83-926968-1-0
- 2012 Gejerel. Mniejszości seksualne w PRL-u, Krzysztof Tomasik, Wydawnictwo Krytyki Politycznej, Warszawa, ISBN 978-83-62467-54-9
- 2012 Kłopoty z seksem w PRL (chapter by Agata Fiedotow: Początki ruchu gejowskiego w Polsce 1981–1990), joint publication edited by Marcin Kula, Wydawnictwa Uniwersytetu Warszawskiego i Instytut Pamięci Narodowej, Warszawa, ISBN 978-83-235-0964-6

== See also ==
- Lambda Groups Association
- Kampania Przeciw Homofobii
- Lambda Warsaw
- LGBT rights organisation
