= Łódź gay murderer =

Unidentified Polish serial killer

Łódź Gay Murderer
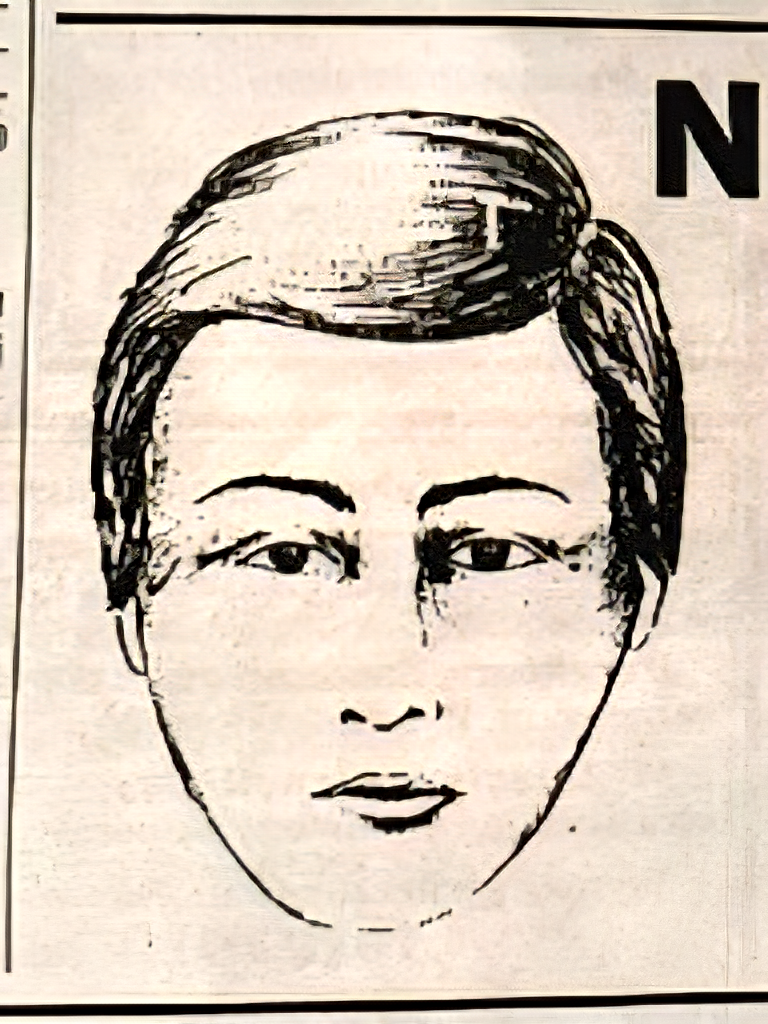
- Composite sketch of the murderer from 1993

Details
- Victims: 7
- Span of crimes: 1988–1993
- Country: Poland
- Date apprehended: Never captured

The Łódź gay murderer is an unidentified Polish serial killer who operated in Łódź from 1988 to 1993. He murdered seven men, all of them homosexuals.

== Circumstances of the crimes ==
Between 1988 and 1993, a string of violent murders targeted gay men in Łódź, Poland. The killer, who has never been identified, met his victims at public cruising spots known as pikiety, primarily near Łódź Fabryczna railway station and Stanisław Moniuszko Park. The victims—seven men in total—were killed shortly after bringing the suspect to their apartments, typically during or after sexual activity. The killer's methods included strangulation, stabbing, and blunt force trauma. After the murders, the perpetrator stole valuables such as jewelry, cash, and other possessions from the victims' apartments. One victim was found murdered outdoors in a forested area near Łódź.

== Victims ==
The victims of the serial killer and the circumstances around their deaths:

=== Stefan W. ===
37-year-old Stefan W. was murdered in June 1988. His body was discovered on June 27 in his apartment on Grabowa Street in Łódź. The perpetrator restrained him using a wire and inflicted multiple stab wounds with a knife found at the scene. The body was concealed under furniture, delaying its discovery. Stefan was a pensioner who lived alone but was known to receive male visitors.

=== Jacek C. ===
40-year-old Jacek C. was murdered on 30 July 1989. His body was discovered on 4 August 1989 in his apartment located on Ernsta Thalmanna Street (now Cardinal Stefan Wyszyński Avenue) in Łódź. Jacek had been tied up with a belt and a string, then suffocated with a cloth pushed into his mouth. There were no signs of forced entry, suggesting that Jacek likely let the perpetrator into his home voluntarily.

=== Bogdan J. ===
50-year-old Bogdan J. was murdered on November 22, 1989. His body was discovered in his apartment on Łanowa Street in Łódź by his mother. He was found lying on his back in a pool of blood, wearing only a singlet. Bogdan had suffered numerous stab wounds inflicted with such force that a knife pierced his body through. The attack was characterized by extreme violence and fury.

Police investigations revealed that Bogdan had attended a social gathering earlier that evening, left with a companion, and later invited a young man—described by witnesses as a "cherubic-looking blond with curls"—to his apartment. According to available information, he made a telephone call to a friend after returning home, indicating that the evening was going well. Subsequent attempts to reach him were unsuccessful, prompting his mother to visit the apartment and discover his body.

The murderer's pattern of action was consistent with previous crimes: the event was accompanied by alcohol, sex, and, ultimately, theft. Several valuable items were stolen from the apartment, including a VCR, VHS cassettes, binoculars, savings books, a gold signet ring, and several hundred dollars. Police created a composite sketch of the suspected perpetrator based on witness descriptions and questioned over 70 individuals in connection with the case.

=== Andrzej S. ===
41-year-old Andrzej S. was murdered on February 25, 1990, and his body was discovered on March 5, 1990, in his apartment at Gładka Street in Łódź. He was known to suffer from schizophrenia and regularly attended a day care center on Przędzalnicza Street. After he failed to appear at the center for several days, a social worker visited his home and found him dead, with multiple stab wounds likely inflicted by a tool originating from the apartment.

Valuable items, including a television, jewelry, and a small amount of cash, were reported missing from the premises; however, official sources do not confirm the theft of 150,000 złoty (approximately US$20–40 in 1990) as claimed in some accounts. During the investigation, a notebook documenting his sexual contacts was found. This case prompted police to link it with earlier homicides of gay men in the area, leading investigators to suspect that the crimes were committed by the same perpetrator.

=== Jakub M. ===
41-year-old Jakub M. was murdered on 31 July 1990, and his body was discovered the same day in a forest near Głowno, outside Łódź. The body was found almost naked, lying beside an abandoned Żuk van, with no personal belongings reported missing from the scene. Forensic examination confirmed the cause of death as homicide, and the circumstances indicated the killing had a homosexual background. This case stands out among others in the series due to the outdoor location and the condition of the body, as most other victims were found inside their own homes.

=== Jan D. ===
48-year-old Jan D. was murdered in February 1992. The corpse was found in his home, with his head tied with an electric wire, a broken nose, and fatal skull injuries. The body was covered with pillows and a duvet. The killer attempted unsuccessfully to set the scene on fire to cover his tracks. A video recorder and a notebook containing addresses, phone numbers, and meeting dates were stolen from the apartment.

=== Kazimierz K. ===
62-year-old Kazimierz K. was murdered on 11 July 1993. His body was found the next day in his apartment at Konstytucyjna Street in Łódź. Kazimierz was beaten—the perpetrator struck him many times with a blunt object; he had a broken nose, torn nostrils, a torn ear, and numerous bruises and abrasions on his body. The cause of death was suffocation. Valuable items were missing from the apartment, including a radio cassette player, leather clothing, and a kitchen knife. There were no signs of forced entry, suggesting that Kazimierz likely let the perpetrator into his home voluntarily.

== Perpetrator ==
After the murder of Kazimierz K. (aged 62), a pensioner who was found dead on July 12, 1993, in his apartment at Konstytucyjna Street in Łódź, a key witness came forward. The witness, a gay man who had previously been intimate with a young man named Roman, testified that he and Roman had visited Kazimierz K.’s apartment the day before the murder. When all the other guests left, only Kazimierz and Roman remained. The next day, Kazimierz was found dead.

Roman told the witness many details about himself: he claimed to have been raped by an educator from a reformatory at age 15, to work at the Eskimo cotton industry plant, and to live with his mother near Rzgowska Street. Roman was described as 27 years old, 1.78 meters tall, with hazel eyes, dark blond hair combed to the side, and distinctive tattoos: a dot near his left eye, a dot on his larynx, and letters on the fingers of his left hand.

== Aftermath ==
In 2007, officers from the Łódź Police Archives re-examined the murder series, signaling renewed investigative interest in the case. This review was part of a broader effort to leverage advances in forensic science and digital record-keeping to revisit cold cases. Despite these efforts, no significant breakthroughs were made, and the killer's identity remained elusive.

According to analyses published in Polish academic journals, such as Acta Universitatis Lodziensis. Folia Iuridica, the investigation was periodically revisited as new investigative techniques became available and as societal attitudes toward the victims and the case evolved. The article by Tomasz Berdzik highlights that, over time, the case accumulated a large volume of documentation, with periodic reviews and public statements intended to maintain transparency and respond to ongoing public and media interest. However, the lack of definitive leads and the passage of time meant that the investigation never resulted in an arrest.

The case, officially closed due to the statute of limitations in 2023, remains one of the most notorious unsolved serial murder investigations in Polish history. The periodic reviews, including the 2007 archival initiative, demonstrate the continuing impact of the case on Polish law enforcement and forensic science, as well as its enduring place in public memory.

== See also ==
- LGBTQ history in Poland
- LGBTQ rights in Poland
- List of fugitives from justice who disappeared
