= Lambda Groups Association =

Lambda Groups Association (Note: Polish: Stowarzyszenie Grup Lambda; abbr.: SGL) was a first officially registered LGBT movement organization in Poland, that operated from 1990 to 1997. It was established by members of three unofficially functioning organizations: FILO Lambda-Gdańsk, WHM Lambda-Warsaw and ETAP Lambda-Wrocław, with notable members being: Sławomir Starosta, Waldemar Zboralski, Ryszard Ziobro, and Ryszard Kisiel. It was the second organization attempting to legalize LGBT movement organizations in Poland, with Warsaw Gay Movement, disestablished in 1987, being the first.

== Organization ==
The organization had its branches in 15 cities: Bydgoszcz, Bytom, Gdańsk, Kraków, Lublin, Łódź, Olsztyn, Piotrków Trybunalski, Poznań, Szczecin, Toruń, Warsaw, and Wrocław.
