= Halszka Wasilewska =

Halszka Wasilewska can refer to:

- Halszka Wasilewska (soldier)
- Halszka Wasilewska (journalist)
