= Lisette Kampus =

Estonian LGBT activist (born 1984)

Lisette Kampus (born 21 March 1984 in Tallinn) is an Estonian LGBT rights movement activist.

She is daughter of the actor Mart Kampus and Krista Kampus. Between 2006-2011 she was a member of the Estonian Social Democratic Party. She also hosted the Estonian National Broadcasting TV show Mõistlik või mõttetu from 2012 to 2013. She lives openly as a lesbian.

Lisette Kampus has been one of the leaders of the contemporary Estonian sexual minorities movement. She has dealt with issues like same-sex partners' equal rights, the position of non-heterosexuals in the society, the protection of their rights and the fight against intolerance and discrimination.

From 2005 to 2007, Kampus lived in Warsaw, Poland and worked as an EU coordinator at the LGBT rights organization Kampania Przeciw Homofobii. Since 2006 she is a member of the board of the pan-European LGBT umbrella organization ILGA-Europe in Brussels. From 2004 to 2007 Lisette Kampus was one of the organizers and the spokesperson of Tallinn Pride (yearly festival organized to support sexual minorities' rights).

From 2008 on, Kampus worked as the Social Democratic Party internal communication manager, counselling the party's leading politicians. As such, she has cooperated with Jüri Pihl, Katrin Saks and Sven Mikser, being one of the latter's closest supporters during the 2010 party chairman election.

In 2007, the President Toomas Hendrik Ilves awarded her (among others) the title Estonian Volunteer of the Year.
