= Waldemar Zboralski =

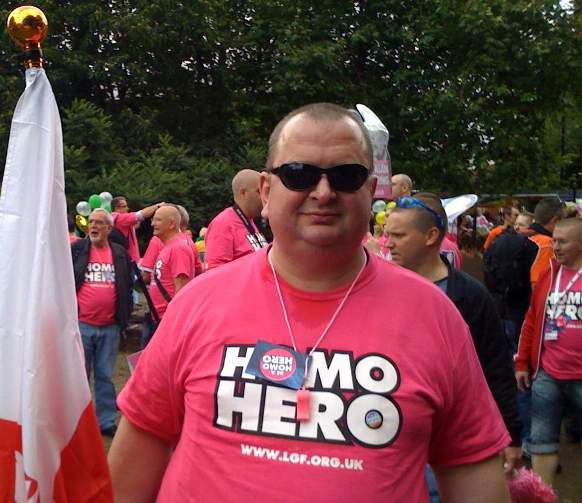
- Waldemar Zboralski (2009)
- Born: 4 June 1960 (age 65); Nowa Sól

Waldemar Zboralski (born 4 June 1960) is a Polish former gay rights activist, politician, and journalist.

== Life ==
Zboralski was born in Nowa Sól where he grew up and graduated from high school. He was detained and registered as a homosexual in a national database under Operation Hyacinth.

Zboralski arrived in Warsaw in 1986 and lived there for two years – from January 1986 to April 1988 – where he was an active participant and organizer of Warsaw gay movement. In 1987, he was a co-founder and the first chairman of Warsaw Gay Movement. In March 1988 Zboralski and a group of 15 people, including Sławek Starosta and Krzysztof Garwatowski, filed a formal application to register the Warsaw Gay Movement. The application was rejected due to an intervention from General Kiszczak, Minister of Internal Affairs, for stated reasons of "public morality".

Zboralski was called by Radio Free Europe's research as a member of “Independent movement in Eastern Europe” for the first time on 17 November 1988.

According to Krzysztof Tomasik, author of the book "Gejerel. Mniejszości seksualne w PRL-u" ("Gayerel. Sexual minorities in PRL"), Zboralski was the "gay Wałęsa", "the main force behind Warsaw gay movement".

Zboralski has been lobbying for the legalization of same-sex marriages in Poland, he was the first person to publish articles on this subject in the Polish press.

In 2003 he was the first person to become an honorary member of a Polish LGBT organization, Campaign Against Homophobia. In 2004, as an openly gay candidate of Reason Party, Zboralski was unsuccessful in elections to the European Parliament. In 2005 he was an unsuccessful openly gay candidate of Union of the Left for the Sejm, the lower house of the Polish parliament.

On 12 October 2007 Zboralski married his partner Krzysztof Nowak in Great Britain as the first Polish gay couple married in that country.

In 2020 he participated in Radio Maryja prayer for "conversion of as many people as possible from the sin of homosexuality". Since 2020 he has been described as "converted from the sin of homosexuality" by Radio Maryja and Telewizja Trwam, he also said that homosexuality is being used to attack the Catholic church.

Currently he resides in England working as a registered nurse.
