= Operation Hyacinth =

Secret operation to create a national database of Polish homosexuals (1985–1987)

- Operation name: Operation Hyacinth
- Scope: Nationwide

Participants
- Initiated by: Czesław Kiszczak
- Executed by: Milicja Obywatelska

Mission
- Objective: Create a national database of homosexuals and people who were in touch with them

Timeline
- Date begin: 15 November 1985
- Date end: 1987
- Duration: ≈2 years

Results
- Miscellaneous results: 11,000 people detained and placed in a government registry

Operation Hyacinth (Polish: Akcja Hiacynt) was an operation carried out in Poland by the Milicja Obywatelska from 1985 to 1987. Its purpose was to create a national database of homosexuals and people who were in touch with them, resulting in the detainment and registration of around 11,000 people.

== Operation ==
Upon order of Minister of Internal Affairs Czesław Kiszczak, the operation began on 15 November 1985. The initially stated justification was to control HIV/AIDS (which at the time was believed to be isolated to the gay community) and to control criminal gangs and prostitution. However, the Służba Bezpieczeństwa functionaries also wanted to gather compromising evidence which would later be used to blackmail involved individuals, who would be more willing to cooperate with the security services. SB agents were also sent to check for opposition movements in said groups.

Each day, in different colleges, factories and offices across Poland, SB functionaries arrested numerous persons suspected of being gay or of having connections with LGBT groups. Those arrested had special files entitled Karta homoseksualisty (Card of a homosexual) and some of them were coerced into signing a declaration of homosexuality statement:

I (first name and last name) have been a homosexual since birth. I have had multiple partners in my life, all of them were adult. I am not interested in minors.

Apart from signing the document, those arrested were ordered to give their fingerprints, some of them were blackmailed into describing intimate parts of their sexual lives, and some were blackmailed into denouncing their colleagues.

One of the first to be detained and registered was gay rights activist Waldemar Zboralski, and the operation lasted until 1987, but files were added until 1988. It has been estimated that about 11,000 homosexuals were documented, and the files are now called "Różowe kartoteki" (Pink card index). Members of the LGBT community had asked the Institute of National Remembrance to destroy the files, but the IPN answered that it would have been illegal.

== Aftermath ==
Many members of the gay community went underground as a result of the operation, covering their sexual orientation even deeper. When asked in December 1988 by Kay Winthers of the Baltimore Sun, Polish government spokesman Jerzy Urban denied the operation took place.

On December 8, 1988, Professor Mikołaj Kozakiewicz discussed the operation with General Kiszczak. The latter admitted that Polish security services owned "pink files", but claimed it was only with documentation of those involved in criminal activities. Kozakiewicz later said that he had evidence supporting the claim that files also covered those who were not involved in crimes. During the same meeting, both discussed creation of the first legal LGBT organization in Poland.

In September 2007, two LGBT activists, Szymon Niemiec and www.gaylife.pl's Jacek Adler, asked Institute of National Remembrance to open an investigation against General Kiszczak. On February 15, 2008, the Institute issued a statement refusing to open an investigation, claiming that Hyacinth was an operation of "preventive character" and was legal under 1980s regulations. This decision was widely condemned by members of the LGBT community.

== In Polish popular culture ==
In 2015, the 30th anniversary of the event published two books telling of Action Hyacinth :

- "Pink files" (pol. "Różowe Kartoteki") by Mikolaj Milcke (Polish ed. Dobra Literatura) - fictionalized history of a right-wing politician, who in his youth was detained under Action Hyacinth
- "Codename Hyacinth" (pol. "Kryptonim Hiacynt") by Andrzej Selerowicz (Polish ed. Queermedia)

In October 2021, a Polish crime thriller Operation Hyacinth directed by Piotr Domalewski and starring Tomasz Ziętek was released on Netflix.

== See also ==
- Operation Hyacinth (film)
- LGBT history in Poland
- LGBT rights in Poland
- Warsaw Gay Movement
