= Tadeusz Olszewski =

Polish poet, literary critic, and journalist (1941–2020)

Tadeusz Olszewski (18 August 1941 Mała Wieś - 16 January 2020) was a Polish poet, literary critic, journalist.

== Life ==
A graduate of Polish Studies at the University of Warsaw. He made his debut as a poet in 1961 in the Nowa Kultura weekly. In the years 1968–1984 he worked as a journalist in the editorial office of Ilustrowany Magazyn Turystyczny Światowid. In 1984–1986 he ran the literary criticism section of Tygodnik Kulturalny. In the years 1986–1989 he was the head of the poetry department in the Okolice monthly. In 1988 he publicly came out as gay in an interview, in the same year he also published a pioneer essay on homoerotic aspects of modern polish prose in Polska Miedź (Polish Copper). In 1991–1992 he was the editor of the first Polish gay male monthly Okay, under the pen name of Tomasz Seledyn. In the same year he published Jesień z Audenem (Autumn with Auden), a poetry collection inspired by own gay experiences, which was considered a wider literary coming out. In 1996–2004 he was associated with Kolejowa Oficyna Wydawnicza in Warsaw. Numerous reviews and critical literary sketches were published, among others, by Życie Literackie, Nowe Książki, Nurt, Akcent, Kierunki, Pismo Literacko-Artystyczne. Member of the jury of Konkurs Poetycki im. Rodziny Wiłkomirskich. He lived in Warsaw.

Outside of Poland, his works have been published in anthologies Drobci stekla v ustih (Ljubljana 1989), Diskrete Leidenschaften (Frankfurt 1988), and bilingual (Polish-Albanian) Vetem Itaka mbetet. Tylko Itaka pozostaje (Warsaw 1993).
