= Krzysztof Garwatowski =

Polish LGBT activist

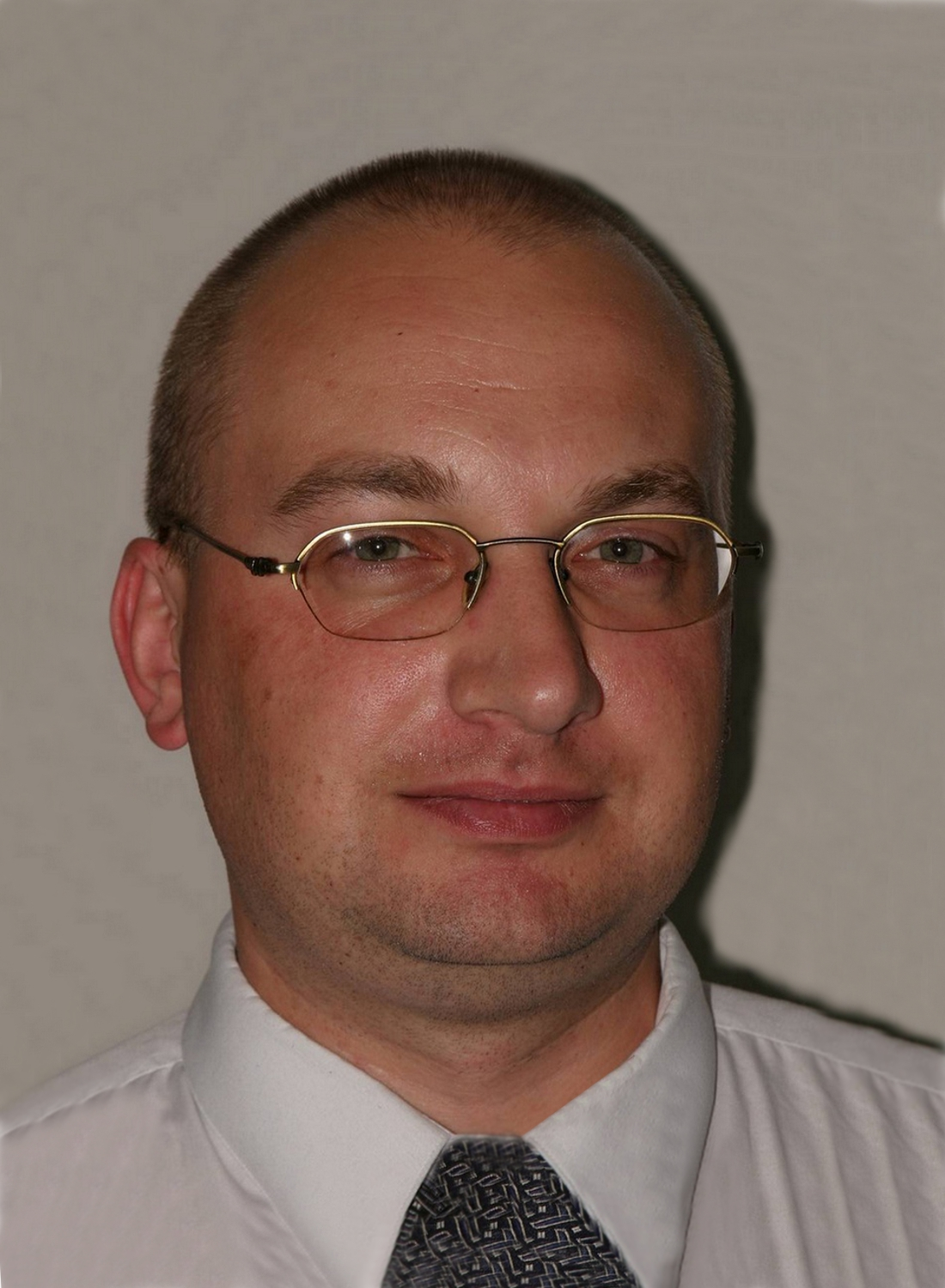
- Born: 2 September 1967 (age 58); Włocławek, Poland
- Occupations: LGBT activist, journalist, teacher

Krzysztof Bogdan Garwatowski (born 2 September 1967) is a Polish LGBT activist, journalist and publisher of porn magazines.

== LGBT activism ==
Garwatowski was born in Włocławek, Poland. Since 1984 he was active at non-Catholic Polish Scouting and Guiding Association. As student at Warsaw University of Technology, he co-founded Warsaw Gay Movement. After he graduated university, he was teacher of mathematics and physics in Warsaw from 1989 to 1997. He was active in LGBT rights in "Stowarzyszenie Grup Lambda" (en: Association of Lambda Groups) in Warsaw. In years 1998–2004, he was a chapter secretary of Polish LGBT price "Tęczowy Laur" (en: Rainbow Laurels), which was granted to VIPs in Poland for their supporting of tolerance to LGBT minorities in this country.

== Porn publishing ==
In 1990, he becomes a leading porn publisher in Poland. He was co-founder of publishing houses: Pink Press and Pink Service, specialized for gay/heterosexual porn magazines and movies on DVD. Between 1990 and 2004, Pink Press published 60% of porn magazines and 80% of porn movies in Poland. Garwatowski was:

- 1990–1992 - editor secretary at gaymagazin "Okey".
- 1997–2004 - together with Sławomir Starosta editor of gaymagazin "Nowy Men".
- 1998–2004 - editor manager of gay-website "Gay.pl".
- 1999–2000 and 2005 until present - co-manager in gaymagazin "Gejzer".
- since 1997 member of management at publishing house "Pink Press".

He was founder and manager of Polish "Eroticon Fairs and Festival" in Warsaw in 2002 and 2004.
