= Halszka Wasilewska (journalist) =

Polish journalist

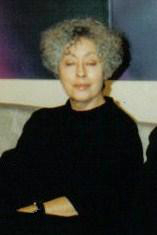
Halszka Wasilewska

Halszka Wasilewska (born 1943) is a Polish TV journalist. Since 1979 she worked in TVP. From 1992 to 2005 she run the morning talk show Kawa czy herbata?.
