= Andrzej Selerowicz =

European LGBT rights activist

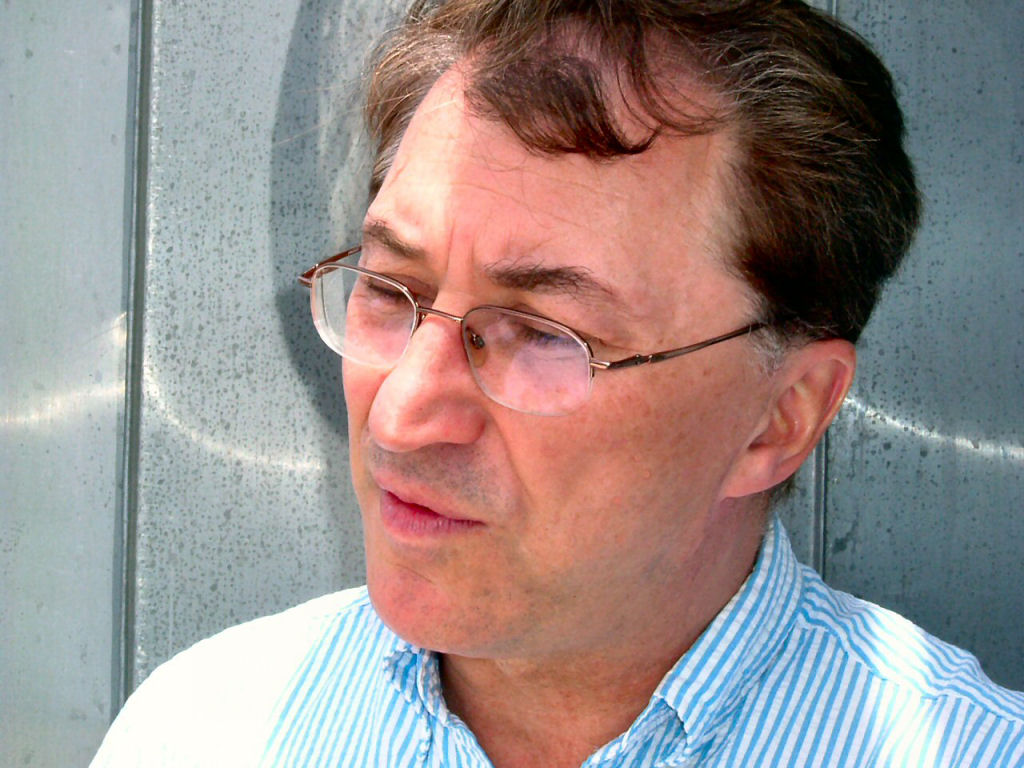
- Andrzej Selerowicz (2007)
- Born: 25 April 1948 (age 76); Bełchatów, Poland
- Occupation(s): Writer, literature translator

Andrzej Selerowicz (born 25 April 1948) is a Polish-born Austrian LGBT activist, writer and literature translator from the English and German languages into the Polish language.

== Life and career ==
Since 1976 he has been living in Vienna, Austria. He is a member of the LGBT organisation Homosexuelle Initiative Wien (HOSI Wien). Since 1982, he has been the chairman of EEIP (Eastern Europe Information Pool), as part of ILGA. He has been responsible for collecting and archiving an open, official, and accessible collection of media and publication sources about the situation of gays and lesbians in Eastern Europe until 1989. In 1984 he published a monograph about his research:

- (1984) Rosa Liebe unter dem Roten Stern: zur Lage d. Lesben u. Schwulen in Osteuropa, Published by: Frühlings Erwachen in Hamburg, ISBN 3-922611-86-9

Since 1983, he has supported the creation and development of the Polish gay and lesbian movement. Beginning in 1983, he started writing and spreading information among Polish gays with an illegal newsletter entitled Etap, which later gave the name to the first LGBT clandestine group in Wrocław. In a 1984 edition, he first used the term gej in order to create a neutral sounding Polish substitution for homosexual to substitute for the many derogatory words that existed. Since then it has been a broadly accepted term in the Polish language.

From 1987 to 1988 he was a consultant for the Warszawski Ruch Homoseksualny (Warsaw Gay Movement). As there were no books about being LGBT, and the issue was completely taboo in Polish media, he started translating and editing (from English and German) classical and well-known homoerotic literature (Wilde, Baldwin, etc.). Starting in 1990 he cooperated for 10 years with the editorial staff of the Polish magazine Inaczej in Poznań, regularly writing articles and essays. In Poland, he published books referring to LGBT themes:

- (1993): Leksykon kochających inaczej. Fakty, daty, nazwiska (LGBT Lexicon- Facts, Dates, and Names), published by Wydawnictwo Softpress, Poznań, ISBN 83-900208-6-6
- (2017): Zbrodnia, której nie było (The Crime that Never Was), published by Wydawnictwo Novae Res, Gdynia, ISBN 978-83-8083-604-4
- (2018): Ariel znaczy lew, published Wydawnictwo Novae Res, Gdynia, ISBN 978-83-8083-835-2

His participation in the Polish LGBT movement has been mentioned in:

- (2012): Gejerel. Mniejszości seksualne w PRL-u (pages: 44, 350–351, 355, 370), author: Krzysztof Tomasik, published by Wydawnictwo Krytyki Politycznej, Warsaw, ISBN 978-83-62467-54-9
- (2012): Kłopoty z seksem w PRL (chapter: Początki ruchu gejowskiego w Polsce 1981–1990), co-authors leading: Marcin Kula, co-published by Wydawnictwa Uniwersytetu Warszawskiego and Instytut Pamięci Narodowej, Warsaw, ISBN 978-83-235-0964-6
- (2017): Transnational Homosexuals in Communist Poland (pages: 67–69, 106, 138, 224, 232), author: Lukasz Szulc, published by Global Queer Politics, London, ISBN 978-3-319-58900-8

He translated these books into Polish:

- (1990) Gore Vidal: The City and The Pillar (pl: Nie oglądaj się w stronę Sodomy), published by Fundacja Polonia, ISBN 83-85080-01-5
- (1991) James Baldwin: Giovanni's Room (pl: Mój Giovanni), published by Państwowy Instytut Wydawniczy, Warsaw, ISBN 83-06-02048-0
- (1992) Oscar Wilde: Teleny, published by Wydawnictwo Softpress, Poznań, ISBN 83-900208-0-7
- (2011) Oscar Wilde: Teleny, published by Wydawnictwo Interwers, ISBN 978-83-623-4407-9

In 2000, he worked at the Documentation Centre of Austrian Resistance archives in Vienna, where he collaborated in the research about the persecution by the German and Austrian Nazis and about bringing them to trial after World War II. He was also coauthor of research results published in 2009 in Austria. He took part in several scientific conferences in Austria, Germany and Poland about this topic and published several articles.

On the occasion of the 30th anniversary of Operation Hyacinth, he published a novel, combining authentic historical facts with a fictional story, giving a focused picture of the interrogation of 11,000 gay men by the police and security agents in Poland from 1985 to 1987 and the resulting "pink files". It was published in Kraków:

- (2015): Kryptonim Hiacynt (Codename Hyacinth), published by Queermedia.pl, ISBN 978-83-935246-5-5
