= Let Them See Us =

Polish LGBTQ advertising campaign

"Let Them See Us" (Polish: Niech nas zobaczą) was the first social-and-artistic campaign in Poland meant to oppose homophobia and discrimination because of sexual orientation. It was organized by Campaign Against Homophobia. The action took place in 2003, beginning on Saturday 22 March, presenting 30 gay and lesbian couples in photographs presented on billboards and galleries. The photographer was Karolina Breguła.

The campaign begun with opening an exhibition "Let Them See Us" in a Gallery of Society of Arts Friends "Pałacyk" (Galeria Towarzystwa Przyjaciół Sztuk Pięknych „Pałacyk"). Also, at the time, the billboard action was started in Warsaw, Kraków. Sosnowiec and Tricity. At first, an ad company AMS was to hand around 500 city lights, but they resigned at the last moment. AMS was thus changed into company Cityboard Media. Some posters were vandalized. After a short time, Cityboard Media also resigned.

The social action was met with serious homophobic backlash. For example, in Gdańsk, a local League of Polish Families branch (Liga Polskich Rodzin) protested against the exhibition, accusing it of "promoting deviants" and being made by "aggressive homosexuals". Maciej Rybiński compared the people photographed to "koprofags, fethishists, zoophiles". An exception to the backlash reaction to the exhibition was the one localized in Sosnowiec, unlike those established in bigger Polish cities.

Besides Warsaw, the exhibition took place in:

- Kraków, in Galleria Burzym & Wolf,
- Gdańsk, in Galleria Łaźnia,
- Sosnowiec, in Galleria of Society "Cross Over",
- Lublin, in ACK UMCS "Chatka Żaka"

In 2023, twenty years after the original campaign, the original photographer Karolina Breguła created a followup exhibition Families, with images of gay and lesbian couples with children. Unlike the original images, these were AI generated, as Breguła was concerned about the privacy and safety of parents and children that she knew.
