= Monika Olejnik =

Polish journalist

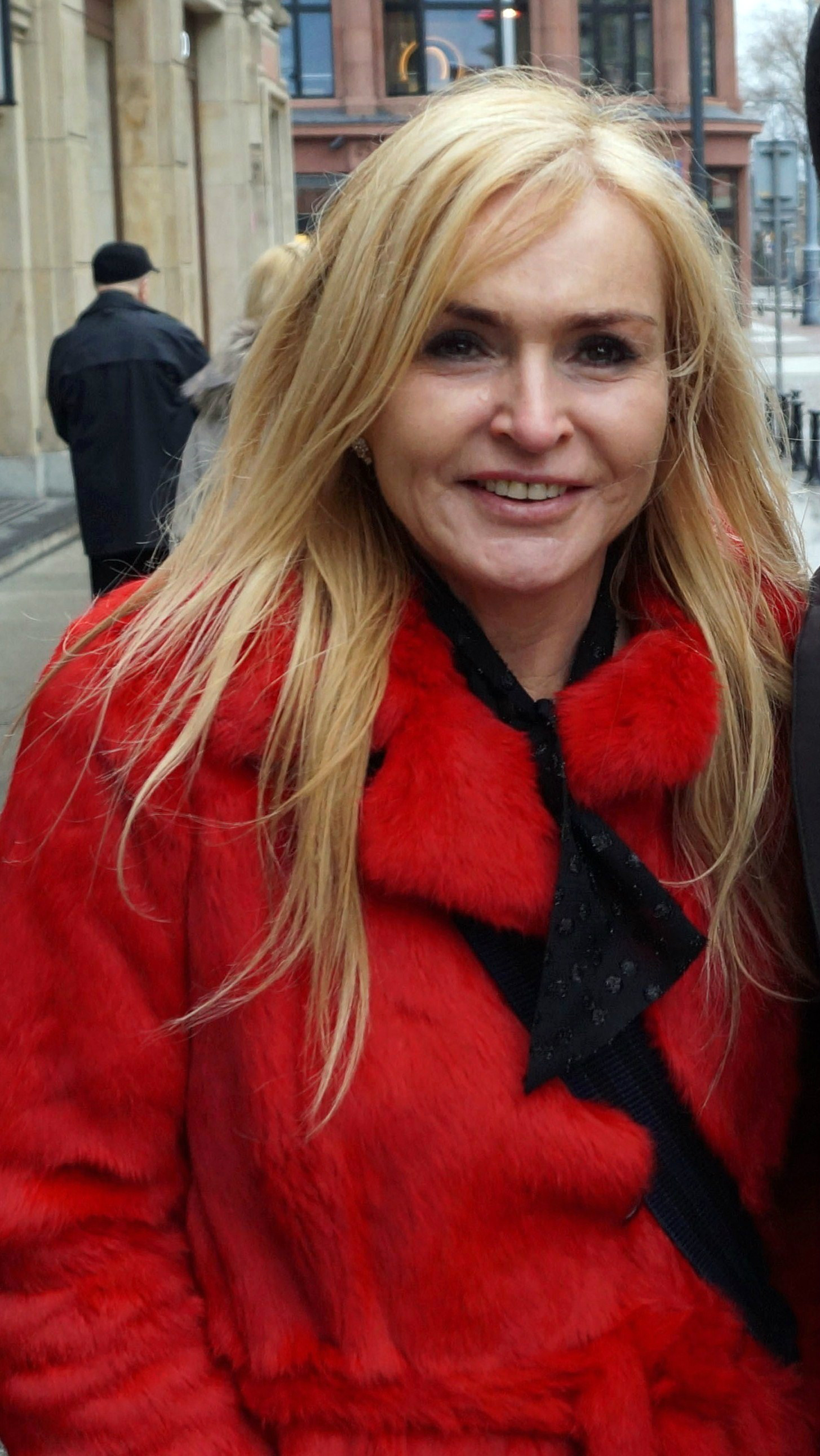
- Olejnik in 2016
- Born: Monika Ewa Wasowska; July 11, 1956
- Education: Warsaw University of Life Sciences
- Occupation: journalist
- Years active: 1980s–present
- Notable work: Salon Polityczny Trójki, Kropka nad i, Prosto w oczy

Monika Olejnik, formally Monika Ewa Wasowska (born 11 July 1956) is a Polish radio, newspaper and TV journalist.

Olejnik studied zoology at Warsaw University of Life Sciences. First she worked in Polish Radio I in a programme for farmers. In 1982 she moved to Polish Radio III and stayed there until 2000. She became well known for her interviews with politicians and other public individuals in "Salon Polityczny Trójki" (Political Salon of Channel 3). In TVN Television she worked on the programme "Kropka nad i" ("Dot above the i"). Since September 2004 she was an interviewer for "Prosto w oczy" ("Straight in the eyes"), a programme on Polish Television Channel I.

She is considered of the most influential Polish journalists in 1990s and 2000s. The fact that her father, Tadeusz Olejnik (1932–2015), was a major serving in Ministry of Public Security in Polish People's Republic, has made her a target of intense critique by the Polish right-wing politicians and journalists.
