= Szymon Niemiec =

Polish priest and gay rights activist

The Rt Revd Szymon Niemiec
- The Rt. Revd. Szymon Niemiec
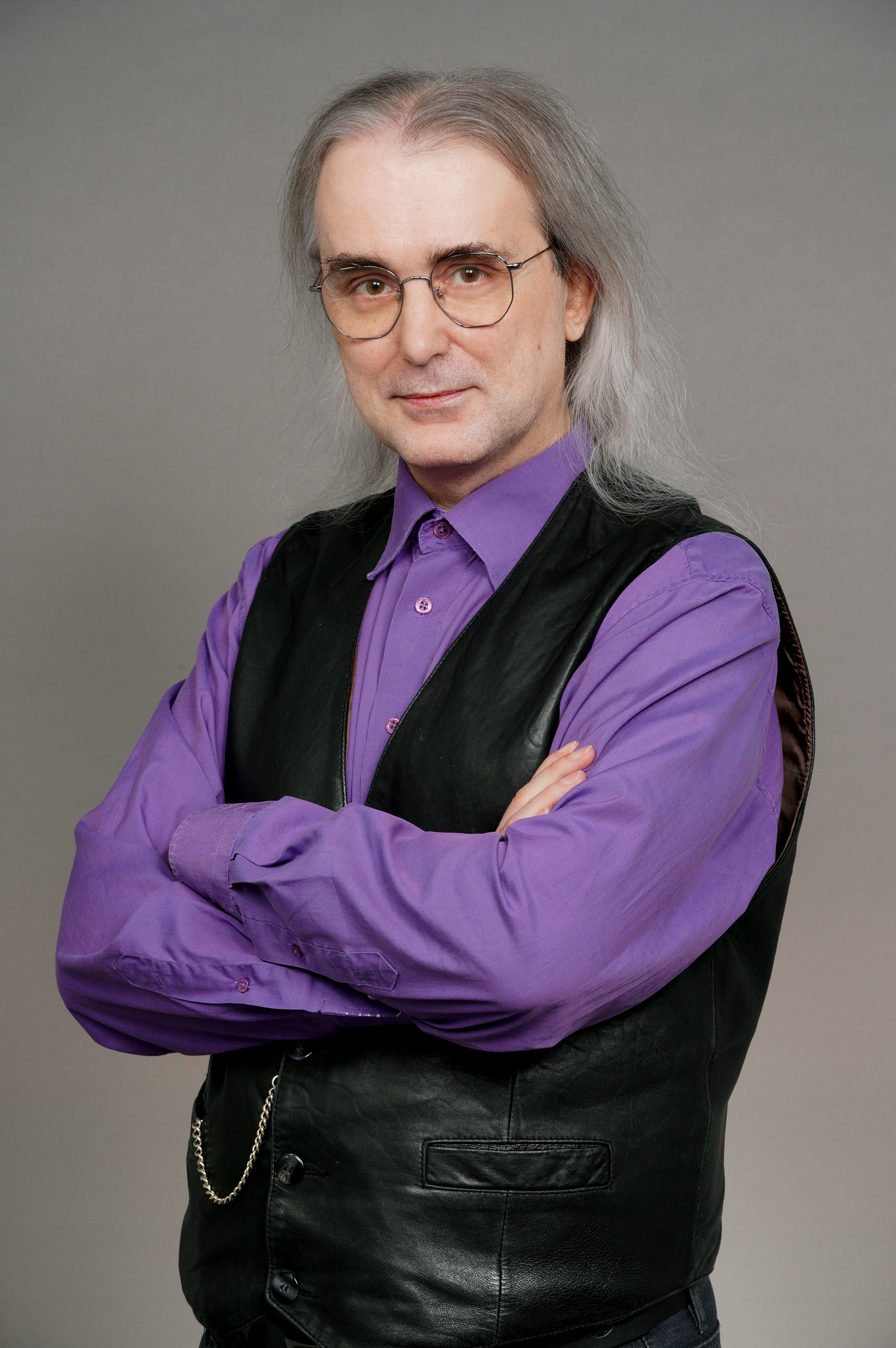
- Niemiec in 2024
- Diocese: Poland

Orders
- Ordination: 2008
- Consecration: 25 August 2012

Personal details
- Born: 5 October 1977 (age 48)
- Denomination: United Ecumenical Catholic Church
- Residence: Warsaw, Poland

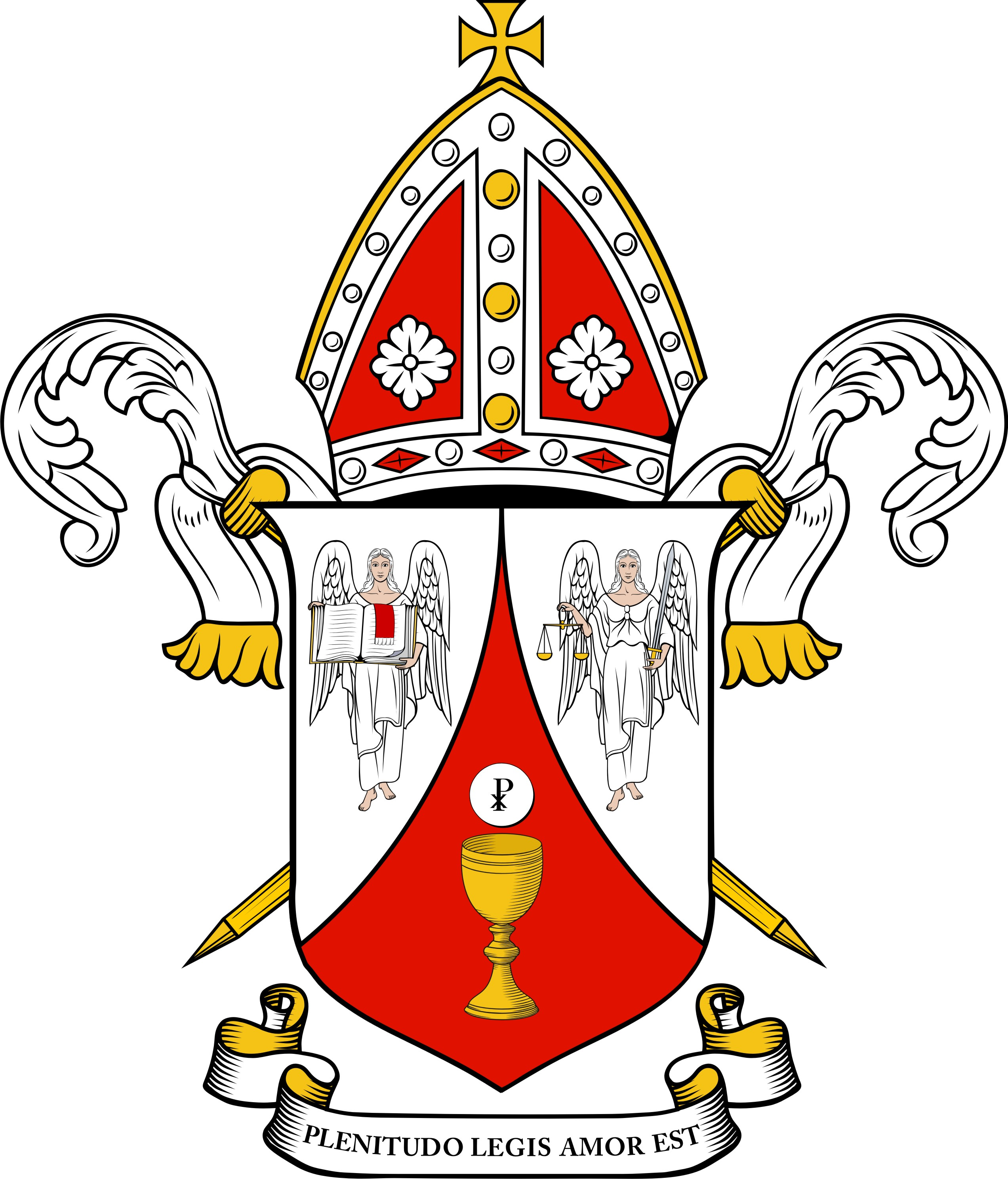
Bishop Niemiec's Coat of Arms

Szymon Niemiec (born 5 October 1977) is a Polish priest, gay rights activist, journalist, photographer, and politician. He is the founder of the first Polish Gay Pride parade, Parada Równości held in 2001. From 2000 to 2006, Niemiec held the post of Cultural Ambassador of Poland to the International Lesbian and Gay Culture Network. From 2001 to 2005, he was President of the International Lesbian and Gay Culture Association in Poland.

Niemiec has been a member of the Union of the Left party since 2002, and on 6 May 2005 he was elected vice president. Since 2008 he is also a pastor of Free Reformed Church of Poland, a progressive Christian denomination. Since 2010 he serves as Elder in Full Connection and Dean of Missionary Conference for Europe in Christian United Church of Poland. On 25 August 2012, Niemiec was consecrated for a Bishop of the Church by Archbishop Terry Flynn.

In May 2007 he published his first book, Rainbow Humming Bird on the Butt.

From 2008, Niemiec became a member of the National Lesbian and Gay Journalists Association, and president of the board of "Friends of Szymon" foundation.

In October 2019, Niemiec was interrogated by police under suspicion of offending religious feelings "by insulting the object of worship in the form of a Roman Catholic Mass"; police had received more than 150 complaints regarding the incident. He had held an ecumenical, LGBT religious service for Warsaw's 2019 Equality Parade, criticized by the Roman Catholic Episcopal Conference of Poland and Law and Justice politicians. Niemiec had held similar services every year since 2010 with little controversy. Niemiec and Julia Maciocha, president of the committee which organizes Equality Parade, stated that the complaint violates the constitutional guarantee of freedom of religion.

== Bibliography ==
- Niemiec, Szymon (2007). Tęczowy koliber na tyłku: autobiografia Szymona Niemca. Warszawa: LGBT Press. ISBN 978-83-924191-1-2.
- Niemiec, Szymon (2007). Rainbow Humming Bird on The Butt: Autobiography. ISBN 978-83-924191-0-5.
- Niemiec, Szymon (2009). Qchnia Queer. Create Space. ISBN 978-1-4495-6027-0.
- Niemiec, Szymon (2009). Soli Deo Gloria. Create Space. ISBN 978-1-4495-6138-3.
