= Lambda Warsaw =

Polish LGBT organization

Lambda Warsaw Association (Polish: Stowarzyszenie Lambda Warszawa) is the oldest operating Polish LGBT organisation. It was founded in October 1997 by activists of Rainbow Centre (Ośrodek “Rainbow”), which existed from 1995 to 1997. As a public interest organisation, its aim is to create a positive gay and lesbian identity, and build social tolerance toward sexual minorities.

In 2004, the association acquired the status of a public interest organisation (OPP), and has been a part of the Mazowia Federation since then.

== Fields of activity ==
- Psychological help and support for gay, lesbian, bisexual, and transgender people: setting up a helpline (Monday to Friday, 6 – 9 pm: 022 628 5222); office duty of psychiatrists, therapists, and lawyers; Gadu-Gadu Messenger duty; Internet chat duty; support and meeting groups (both for gay, lesbian, and transgender people, and their relatives).
- HIV/AIDS and addictions prevention: Safer Relationships programme (Program “Bezpieczne związki”), street- and partyworkers’ actions in LGBT clubs; office duty at Lambda Warszawa HQ; Internet chat duty; addictions prevention projects; internet portal www.bezpytan.pl.
- Cultural and social actions addressed to LGBT people: The Film Club; library and reading room; organising discussions and meetings about LGBT literature; active students’ group
- Anti-discrimination actions: Report on Sexual Discrimination in Poland (“Raport o dyskryminacji ze względu na orientację seksualną w Polsce”); social actions: Global Village (as part of All Different – All Equal Council of Europe Campaign, March 2007); Living Library project; anti-discrimination trainings. Along with Campaign Against Homophobia (KPH) and other LGBT organisations from across the Europe (Germany, France, and Spain), Lambda Warszawa annually gives Tolerance Award (Nagroda Tolerancji) for sexual orientation-based anti-exclusion policy. Polish Tolerance Award laureates are Kazimierz Kutz (2006), Piotr Pacewicz (2007), Marzanna Pogorzelska (2008), and Zbigniew Holda (2009). Thanks to Lambda Warszawa presidents, Yga Kostrzewa and Krzysztof Kliszczynski, along with activists from other Polish LGBT organisations, the European Court of Human Rights pronounced illegal the ban put by the president of Warsaw, Lech Kaczynski, on the Equality Parade in 2005.

Lambda Warszawa is the first and only LGBT organisation in Poland that provides microgrants to other organisations that help homosexual persons: as part of Stonewall Fund, Lambda Warszawa Microgrant Fund, the first fund competition was launched on May 28, 2009.

== Projects ==
- Helpline and Legal and Psychological Help Programme: started in Rainbow Centre in 1995, running since then
- Safer Relationships programme: HIV/AIDS prevention since 2000
- Report on Sexual Discrimination in Poland: 2000, 2001, 2002, and 2005–2006
- Sunday with Lambda project (projekt „Niedziela z Lambdą”) from 2002 until 2004: monthly movie and discussion meetings in Bastylia, a pancake shop in Warsaw
- I Choose Tolerance project (projekt “Wybieram tolerancję”): an action connected to self-government elections in 2006 (inquiring future officials about their attitude toward LGBT people)
- Season for Rubber project (projekt “Sezon na gumy”): all-Poland informational action about the usage of condoms (http://www.sezonnagumy.pl, 2007)
- Co-creation of Polish National Campaign Committee (NCC): committee coordinating Polish campaign All Different-All Equal by Council of Europe (2007-2008)
- Global Village project: anti-homophobia action (March 2007)
- Academy of Anti-Discrimination project: trainings for self-government officials and non-governmental activists as part of European Year of Equal Chances for All (ERRSW)(March 2008)
- Living Library Project: Let’s Talk About Diversity (Projekt Żywa Biblioteka – porozmawiajmy o różnorodności) (2008-2009)
- Counselling service: www.bezpytan.pl (2009)
- Stonewall Fund: Lambda Warszawa Microgrant Fund (since May 2008)
- Counteract discrimination - it is not difficult! project (projekt "Przeciwdziałaj dyskryminacji – to nie jest trudne!"): project against discrimination based on gender, disability, sexual orientation, religion or age. przeciwdzialajdyskryminacji.pl (2009)

== Authorities ==
Authorities of the association are elected by its members during general election meetings. Term in office of the management lasts two years, and, as chairpersons, there have been:

- Michal Pawlega (1997-2005)
- Yga Kostrzewa (2005-2007)
- Krzysztof Kliszczynski (2007-2011, 2019-)
- Dorota Bregin (since 2011)

== Publications ==
- Report on Sexual Discrimination in Poland (2000, 2001, 2002, 2005-2006)
- Against Discrimination. Education Pack for Trainers (Warsaw 2005, ISBN 83-923420-0-3, ISBN 978-83-923420-0-7)
- Let’s Talk About Diversity. Living Library. A Book of Good Practice (Warsaw 2008)
- A Legal Guide for Lesbians, Gays, and Transsexuals (Warsaw 2008)
- A Guide for Helpline Operators (Warsaw 2008)
