= Jiří Pehe =

Czech political analyst and writer (born 1955)

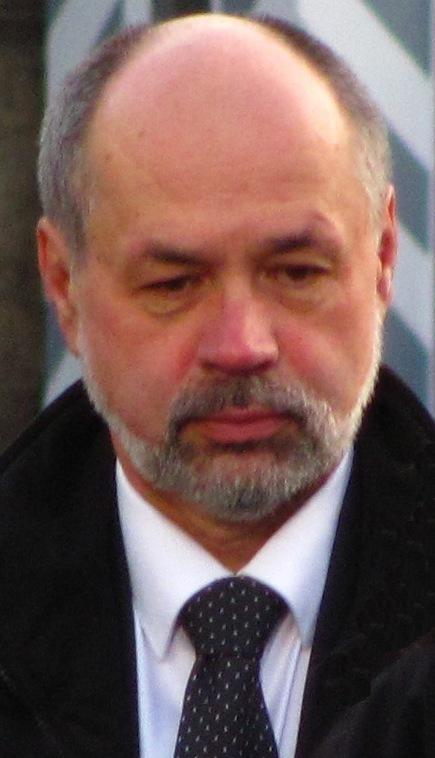
- Jiří Pehe in 2011
- Born: 26 August 1955 (age 71); Rokycany, Czechoslovakia (now Czech Republic)
- Occupations: Political analyst, writer

Jiří Pehe (born 26 August 1955) is a Czech political analyst and writer, and since 1999, has been the director of New York University's academic center in Prague.

== Early life and education ==
Pehe was born in Rokycany (western Bohemia) in the Czech Republic. He studied law and philosophy at Charles University in Prague, where he earned a Magister's degree in 1978 and a doctorate in 1980. In September 1981 he fled Czechoslovakia, through SFR Yugoslavia to Italy.

After a short stay in a refugee camp near Rome, he arrived with his wife in New York in the US. Until 1983 he worked as a night receptionist at the Algonquin Hotel in New York. He attended School of International Affairs at Columbia University in New York and graduated in 1985.

== Career ==
From 1985 to 1988, Pehe worked for Freedom House. From August 1988, he worked as a Czechoslovak analyst for Radio Free Europe in Munich. In November 1989 he became the head of Central European Research and Analysis. After Radio Free Europe moved its headquarters from Munich to Prague in 1995, he moved back to the Czech Republic. From 1995 to 1997 he served as the director of the Analysis and Research Department at the Open Media Research Institute in Prague. From 1997 to 1999, he was the director of the Political Cabinet in the office of Czech President Václav Havel and continued serving as Havel's external political advisor until the end of Havel's term in 2003.

Pehe has written numerous essays and papers that have appeared in world newspapers and academic publications and has also published several books, including three novels. Since 1999 Jiří Pehe has been the director of New York University in Prague. He is a member of International Forum for Democratic Studies Research Council. He frequently comments on political developments for Czech television and radio, and also in the international media. He is the founder of the social-democratic think tank "CESTA".

== Other activities ==
- European Council on Foreign Relations (ECFR), Member

== Personal life ==
Pehe's second wife is American. He has two daughters.

== Publications ==
- 1988: The Prague Spring: a mixed legacy, University Press of America, ISBN 978-0-932088-28-4 (in English)
- 2006: Na okraji zmizelého, PROSTOR, ISBN 978-80-7260-157-8 (in Czech)
- 2009: Tři tváře anděla, PROSTOR, ISBN 978-80-7260-209-4 (in Czech)
- 2010: Demokracie bez demokratů – Úvahy o společnosti a politice, PROSTOR, ISBN 978-80-7260-234-6 (in Czech)
- 2010: Klaus – portrét politika ve dvaceti obrazech, PROSTOR, ISBN 978-80-7260-240-7 (in Czech)
- 2012: Krize, nebo konec kapitalismu?, PROSTOR, ISBN 978-80-7260-267-4, (in Czech)
- 2013: Mimořádná událost, PROSTOR, ISBN 978-80-7260-281-0 (in Czech)
- 2014: Three Faces of an Angel, Jantar Publishing, ISBN 978-0-9568890-4-1 (in English)
