= Sławomir Starosta =

Polish LGBT activist, pornographer, musician, and journalist

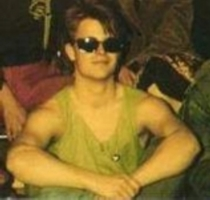
- Sławomir Starosta (1987)
- Born: 17 August 1965 (age 60); Warsaw, Poland
- Occupations: LGBT activist, rock musician, journalist

Sławomir Starosta (born 17 August 1965) is a Polish LGBT activist, musician, journalist and publisher of porn magazines and gay porn websites.

== Biography ==
Starosta was born in Warsaw in Poland. In 1987, as a student of University of Warsaw, he co-founded and was the first vice-president of Warsaw Gay Movement.

In April 1987, during ILGA-Conference in Cologne (Germany), he registered Warsaw Gay Movement to become a member of ILGA. In 1990, he co-founded of "Stowarzyszenie Grup Lambda" (en: Association of Lambda Groups), which in 1997 transformed into Lambda Warszawa.

== Music career ==
He started his music career in 1985 as keyboardist and singer. He was member of follows music-bands:

- 1985–1987: Kosmetyki Mrs. Pinki (punk rock) – keyboard instrument and singing
- 1987–1989: Wańka Wstańka (rock music) – keyboard instrument and singing
- 1989–2004: Balkan Electrique (rock music with Balkan music influences) – keyboard instrument and singing

== Porn publishing ==
In 1990 he became a leading porn publisher in Poland. He was co-founder of publishing houses: Pink Press and Pink Service, specialized for gay porn magazines and movies on DVD. He was editor-manager of gay magazines:

- 1991–1996: "MEN!"
- 1995–1999: "Nowy Men"
- 1999–2004: "Gejzer"

He published porn magazines and movies on DVD as well for heterosexual customers: "Wamp" and "Nowy Wamp". At present time he is editor-manager of porn-websites for Polish gays.
