= Campaign Against Homophobia =

Polish LGBTQ rights organisation

- Kampania Przeciw Homofobii
- Abbreviation: KPH
- VAT ID no.: NIP 5213204077
- Registration no.: KRS 0000111209
- Legal status: Association with OPP status
- Headquarters: Jerusalem Avenue 99/40; Warsaw, Poland
- Website: kph.org.pl

Campaign Against Homophobia (Polish: Kampania Przeciw Homofobii, KPH) is a Polish LGBTQ rights organisation, which aims to promote legal and social equality for people outside of heteronormality. It was founded in Warsaw in September 2001.

It has local branches in Kraków, Wrocław, Łódź, Tricity, Toruń and Silesia region. KPH and Lambda Warszawa Association, which often co-operate (for example within specially formed foundations that organise events like Warsaw Pride and Culture for Tolerance Festival in Kraków) are together the largest NGO organisations of this kind in Poland.

== Goals and activities ==
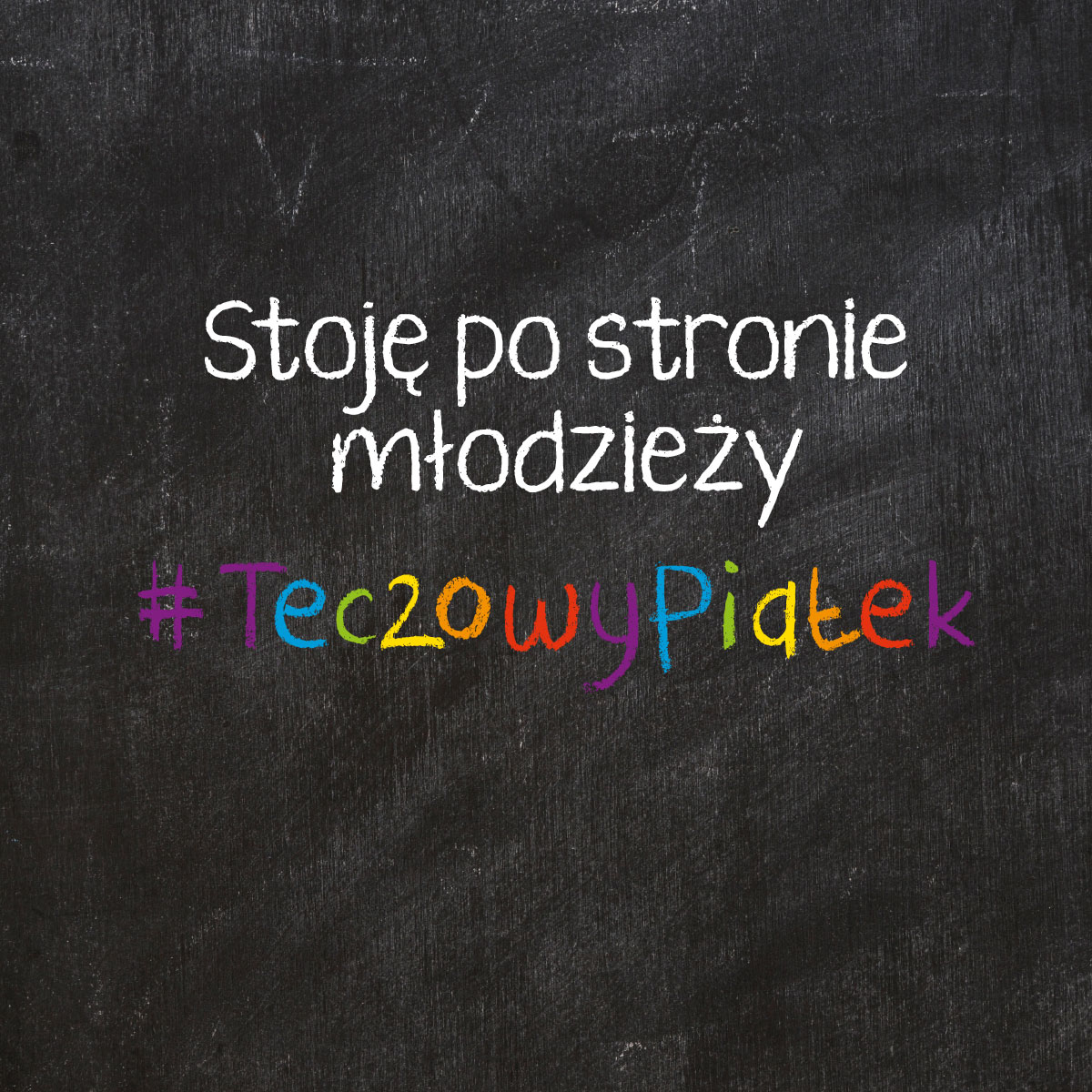
Rainbow Friday (Tęczowy Piątek), an initiative of KPH which promotes the discussion of LGBT rights and fight against discrimination in Polish schools

KPH aims to contribute to establishing a tolerant society, in which gay, lesbian, transgender and other minorities feel comfortable. It undertakes activities in numerous fields:

- conferences,
- exhibitions,
- demonstrations,
- integration parties,
- workshops,
- meetings with politicians, academics,
- political lobbying
- providing legal and psychological counselling, inter alia at the internet portal www.mojeprawa.info
- publishing LGBT-rights quarterly Replika,
- publishing leaflets on various subjects,
- international human rights law and practice monitoring,
- cooperation with similar organisations from other countries and international bodies

etc.

KPH co-operates with other LGBT organisations associated at ILGA. Three members of KPH have been appointed to the ILGA-Europe executive board in Brussels: Lisette Campus,, Tomasz Szypuła,, and in 2013, Mirosława Makuchowska.

Some of the activities undertaken by KPH have attracted massive publicity, and influenced the Polish public. These include:

- Niech nas zobaczą (Let Them See Us) - Photographs portraying gay and lesbian couples standing in the streets and holding hands were to be put by KPH on billboards in major Polish cities in 2003. However, before even occurring in the streets, this has caused enormous public outcry, and a debate on homosexuality on unprecedented scale in Poland. Arguments that these photos would 'promote deviations' caused outdoor advertisement companies to withdraw from contracts on displaying them. As result the photos were displayed in art galleries. This, however, was the point when according to some; discrimination became apparent and obvious (and publicised about) in Poland for the first time.
- Berlin-Yogyakarta Exhibition was first shown in October 2009 for three weeks at the prestigious University Library of Warsaw University, where 500 brochures and 200 copies of the Yogyakarta Principles (translated into Polish) were distributed. It was also shown in Lublin, Wrocław and Gdańsk according to the Yogyakarta Principles in Action.
- Jestem gejem, jestem lesbijką. Poznaj nas. (I'm gay, I'm a lesbian. Get to know us.) - was a tour around Polish universities: with educational meetings for students, teachers, and LGBT-people's parents - and for many, a first opportunity to talk with openly gay people.
- Festiwal Kultura dla Tolerancji w Krakowie (Culture for Tolerance in Cracow Festival) - This annual Kraków-based Festival founded by KPH members and organised by Culture for Tolerance Foundation (Fundacja Kultura dla Tolerancji), features conferences, workshops, movie screenings, and parties. Its symbol is a controversial and high-concept art piece by US and EU best authors accompanied by numerous activities.
- Nie jesteś sam, nie jesteś sama (You are not alone) - poster campaign in selected cities.
- Spoko, ja też! (Cool, me too!) - short videos showing students sharing their stories related to sexual orientations and its influence on various aspects of their lives in and outside of school.
- Tęczowy Piątek (Rainbow Friday) - campaign initiated in 2016 to show solidarity with LGBTQI youth and support them in the school environment.

== Presidents ==
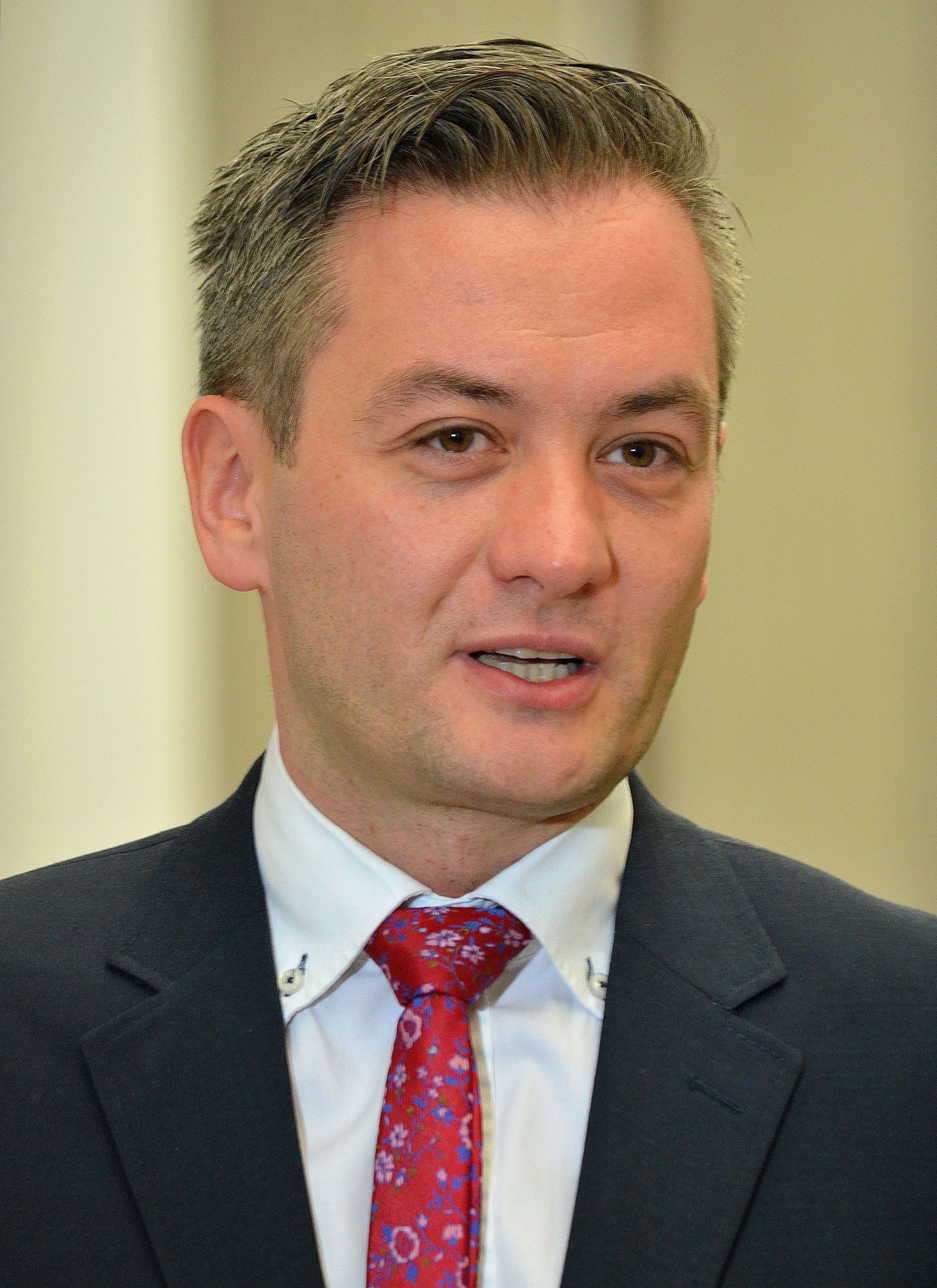
Robert Biedroń

- Robert Biedroń, from 11 September 2001 to 22 February 2009
- Marta Abramowicz, from 22 February 2009 to 18 July 2010
- Tomasz Szypuła, from 18 July 2010 to 26 February 2012
- Agata Chaber, from 26 February 2012 to 2018
- Slava Melnyk, since 2018

== See also ==
- LGBT rights in Poland
- List of LGBT rights organizations
- Heterosexism
- Homophobia
- Civil unions in Poland
