= Zawadzki =

Zawadzki ({|IPA|pl|zaˈvat͡ski|}) (feminine: Zawadzka, plural: Zawadzcy) is a Polish surname of toponymic origin. It is derived from one of the numerous locations named Zawada or Zawady in Poland. It may belong to a noble family bearing the Zawadzki coat of arms.

Historically, due to the instability of the orthography, as well as in the periods of the partitions of Poland by foreign powers the same person or persons of the same family could use different spelling of the surname. Variant spellings include Zawadski, Zavadsky, Zavadski, Zawadowsky, Zawadowski, Sawadsky, Sawadski, Sawatsky, Sawatzky, Zawatzki, etc.

Notable people with these surnames include:

== Zawadzki, Zawadski or Zawacki ==
- Agnes Zawadzki (born 1994), American figure skater
- Aleksander Zawadzki (disambiguation)
- Andrew Zawacki (born 1972), American poet
- Anna Zawadzka (1919–2004), Polish author
- Dariusz Zawadzki (born 1982), Polish football player
- Ewa Zawadzka (born 1950), Polish graphic artist
- Gila Golan (born 1940, originally Zosia Zawadzka), model and actress
- Isztar Zawadzki (1939-2023), a Canadian meteorologst, born in Poland and raised in Argentina
- Janusz Zawadzki (1931–1977), Polish ice hockey player
- Jolanta Zawadzka (born 1987), Polish chess player
- Józef Zawadzki (disambiguation)
- Lance Zawadzki (born 1985), American baseball player
- Janusz Zawadzki (1931–1977), Polish ice hockey player
- Jolanta Zawadzka (born 1987), Polish chess player
- Józef Zawadzki (disambiguation)
- Lance Zawadzki (born 1985), American baseball player
- Magdalena Zawadzka (born 1944), Polish actress
- Marcelina Zawadzka (born 1989), Polish model
- Saturnin Zawadzki (1923–2003), Polish soil scientist
- Sebastian Zawadzki (born 1991), Polish-born composer and pianist
- Stella Márquez Zawadski or Stella Araneta (born 1937), Colombian pageant director and beauty queen
- Stanisław Zawadzki (1743–1806), Polish architect
- Stanisław Zawadzki (born 1984), Polish chess master
- Stanisława Zawadzka (1890–1988), Polish singer
- Stefan Zawadzki (born 1946), Polish historian
- Sylwester Zawadzki (disambiguation)
- Tadeusz Zawadzki (1921–1943), Polish scoutmaster and lieutenant of the Armia Krajowa
- Tavar Zawacki (born 1980), American abstract artist
- Włodzimierz Zawadzki (born 1967), Polish sport wrestler

== Sawatzky, Sawatsky or Sawatzki ==
This version of the name is very prevalent among the Plautdietsch-speaking Russian Mennonites who emigrated from Ukraine to Canada and the United States. Many hundreds or thousands of families with these spellings exist, thus it is likely the most numerous of the many versions listed in this article. Family history suggests it derives from a Pole who converted to Mennonitism and joined the Mennonites in the Vistula delta region. It is not connected to other similar-sounding German names like the Sudeten-German name Watzke or Watzky, with which it is sometimes confused.

- Andrea Sawatzki (born 1963), German actress
- Darren Sawatzky (born 1973), American soccer player
- George Sawatzky (born 1942), Canadian-Dutch physicist
- Harry Leonard Sawatzky (1931–2008), Canadian scholar and writer
- Herb Sawatzky (1933–1999), Australian rules football player
- Jake Sawatzky (born 2000), Canadian politician
- John Sawatsky (born 1948), Canadian author and journalist
- Peter Sawatzky (born 1951), Canadian sculptor
- Mary Sawatzky (born 1961), American politician
- Michelle Sawatzky-Koop (born 1970), Canadian volleyball player
- Sandra Sawatzky, Canadian filmmaker and artist
- Rick Sawatsky (born 1976), Canadian curler

== Other variants ==
- Ed Zawatsky (born 1968), Canadian hockey coach
- Gábor Zavadszky (1974-2006), Hungarian football player

== Fictional characters ==
- Ralph Sawatzky, a protagonist of the 1990 American film Working Trash
- Fabian Sawatzki, Look Who's Back/Er ist wieder da 2015 German satirical black comedy film

== See also ==
- Las Zawadzki, a village in central Poland
- Zawadowski
- Zavadsky, a related surname
- Zawada (surname)
