= LGBT-free zone =

Polish areas declaring against LGBTQ rights

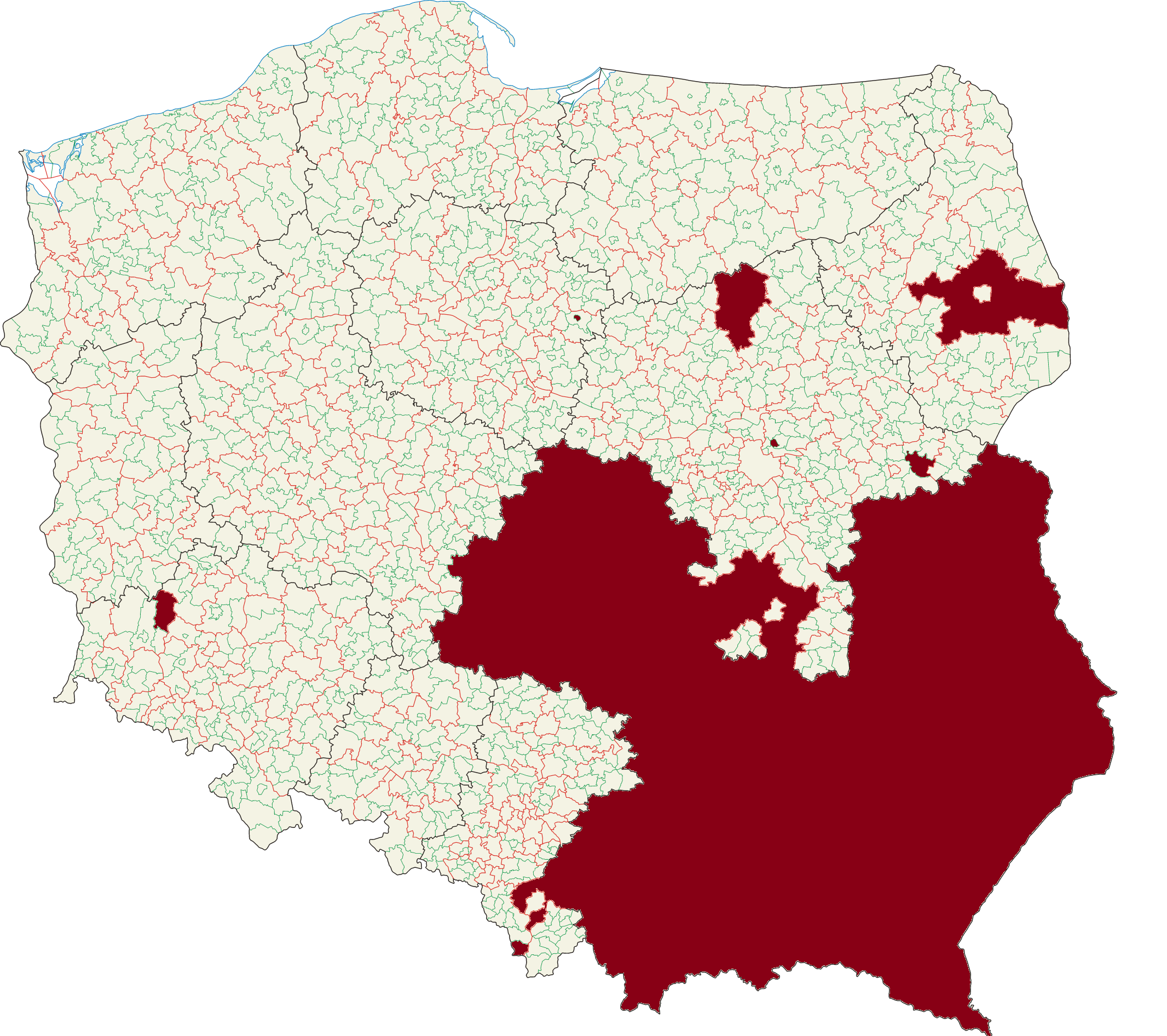
Voivodeships, powiats, and gminas marked in red had passed anti-LGBT resolutions by January 2020. All anti-LGBT resolutions have since been repealed.

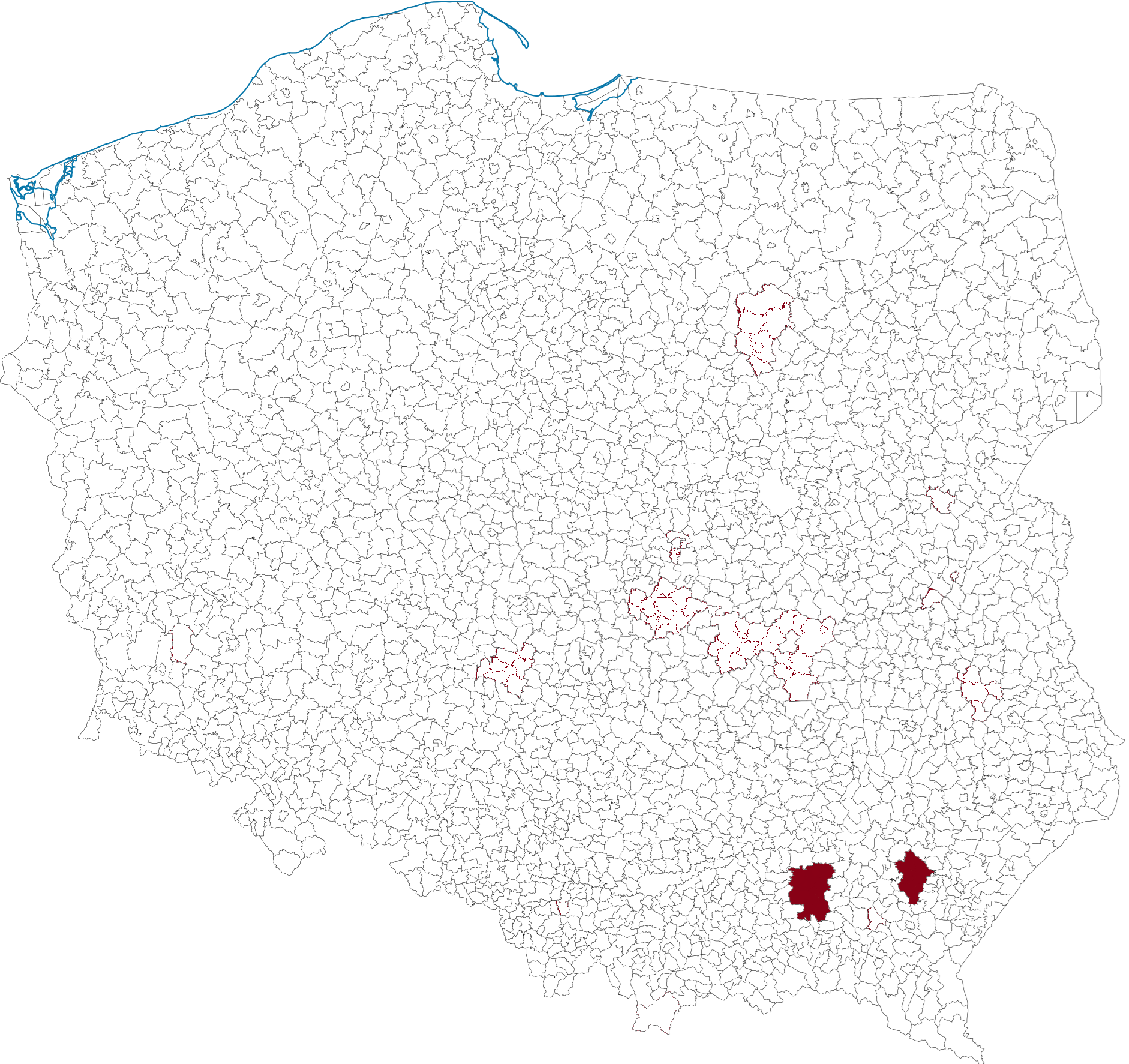
Voivodeships, powiats, and gminas marked in red were LGBT-free zones in February 2025, prior to their abolition in April 2025.

LGBT-free zones (Polish: strefa wolna od LGBT) were municipalities and regions of Poland that had declared themselves unwelcoming of LGBTQ rights, in order to ban equality marches and other LGBTQ events. By June 2020, some 100 municipalities (map), as well as five voivodeships, encompassing a third of the country, had adopted resolutions characterised as "LGBT-free zones". On 6 February 2024, Warsaw's Voivodeship Administrative Court repealed the last document "against LGBT ideology" in Poland. By 24 April 2025, all anti-LGBTQ resolutions and all Local Government Family Rights Charters have been withdrawn or invalidated by court order.

Most of the adopted resolutions were lobbied for by Ordo Iuris, a Catholic and ultra-conservative organisation. While unenforceable and primarily symbolic, the declarations represent an attempt to stigmatise LGBTQ people. The Economist considered the zones "a legally meaningless gimmick with the practical effect of declaring open season on gay people". In a December 2020 report, the Council of Europe Commissioner for Human Rights stated: "Far from being merely words on paper, these declarations and charters directly impact the lives of LGBTI people in Poland." Supporters argued that the zones defended traditional family values, while opponents argued that the zones undermined the LGBTQ rights in Poland.

On 18 December 2019, the European Parliament voted, 463 to 107, to condemn the more than 80 such zones in Poland. In September 2021, four of the voivodeships withdrew the measures, after the European Union (EU) threatened to withhold funding. Poland's Human Rights Ombudsman challenged several LGBTQ-free zone resolutions. In July 2020, the voivodeship administrative courts in Gliwice and Radom ruled that the "LGBTQ ideology free zones" established by the local authorities in the gminas of Istebna and Klwów were null and void, stressing that they violated the constitution and were discriminatory against members of the LGBTQ community living in those counties. In August and September 2020, the Voivodeship Administrative Court in Lublin and Voivodeship Administrative Court in Kielce respectively issued similar judgements on LGBTQ-free zones. Following appeal of the decisions, the Supreme Administrative Court of Poland agreed with the decisions of the four aforementioned courts in June 2022.

From July 2020, the EU denied funding from the Structural Funds and Cohesion Fund to municipalities that adopted "LGBTQ-free" declarations, being in violation of the EU Charter of Fundamental Rights. Poland is the only member state to have an opt-out from the Charter of Fundamental Rights, which it had signed upon its accession to the EU in 2004. In addition, several European sister cities froze their partnerships with the Polish municipalities in question. Due to their violation of EU law, including Article 7 of the EU Treaty, these zones were considered part of the Polish rule-of-law crisis.

== Background ==
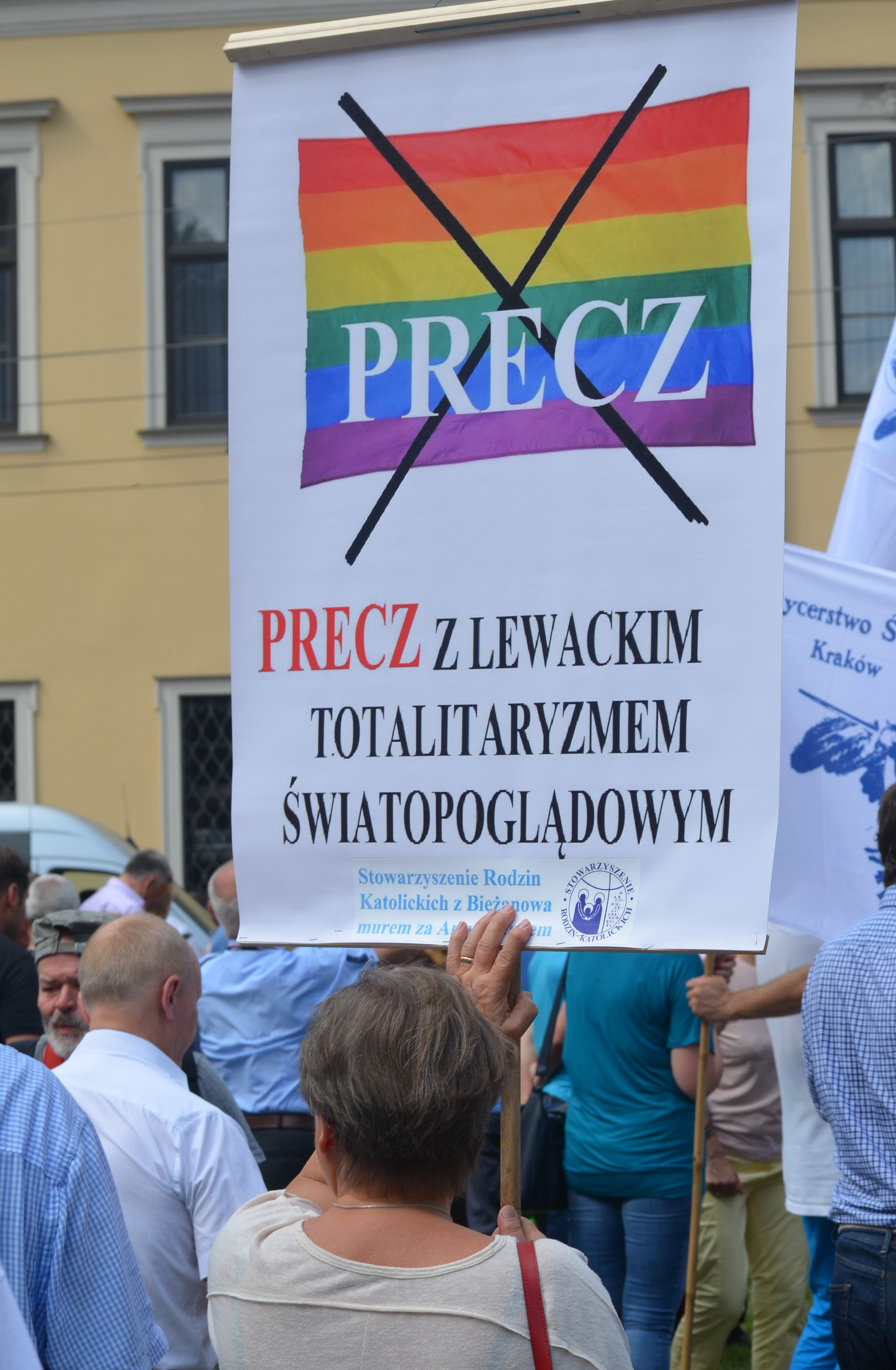
August 2019 protest in support of Archbishop Marek Jędraszewski's statements on LGBTQ. The sign reads: "away ([down]) with leftist ideological totalitarianism", precz (go away) is also on the crossed-out gay pride flag

In February 2019, Warsaw's liberal mayor Rafał Trzaskowski signed a declaration supporting LGBTQ rights, and announced his intention to follow World Health Organization guidelines and integrate LGBTQ issues into the Warsaw school system sex education curricula. Law and Justice (PiS) politicians objected to the program saying it would sexualize children. PiS party leader Jarosław Kaczyński responded to the declaration, calling LGBTQ rights "an import" that threatens Poland.

According to The Daily Telegraph, the declaration "enraged and galvanized" conservative politicians and conservative media in Poland, the "LGBT-free zone" declarations emerging as a reaction to the Warsaw declaration. The British newspaper further argues that the conservative establishment is fearful of a liberal transition that may erode the Catholic Church's power in Poland like the transition around the Irish Church. Decreasing Church attendance, rising secularization, and sexual abuse scandals have put pressure on the conservative position.

Two weeks prior to the 2019 European Parliament election in Poland, a documentary on child sex abuse in the Church titled Tell No One was released online. It was expected to hurt the Church-aligned PiS electorally, and was responded to by PiS leader Kaczyński speaking heatedly of the Polish nation and children as "being under attack by deviant foreign ideas", which led conservative voters to rally around PiS. According to feminist scholar Agnieszka Graff, "The attack on LGBT was triggered by the [Warsaw] Declaration, but that was just a welcome excuse", as PiS sought to woo the rural-traditional demographic and needed a scapegoat to replace migrants.

In the run-up to the 13 October 2019 Polish parliamentary election, PiS focused on countering "LGBT ideology". In 2019, it rebuked the Warsaw mayor's pro-LGBTQ declaration as "an attack on the family and children" and stated that LGBTQ was an "imported" ideology. In August 2019, Marek Jędraszewski (the Archbishop of Kraków) said that "LGBT ideology" was like a "rainbow plague" in a sermon commemorating the Warsaw Uprising. Not long after, a drag queen simulated Jędraszewski's murder on stage, stirring controversy.

As of 2019, being openly gay in Poland's small towns and rural areas "[takes] increasing physical and mental fortitude" due to the efforts of Polish authorities and the Catholic Church, according to The Daily Telegraph. Public perception, however, has been becoming more tolerant of gay people. The 41 percent of Poles surveyed in 2001 stating that "being gay wasn't normal and shouldn't be tolerated" dropped to 24 percent in 2017, and the 5 percent who said "being gay was normal" in 2001 had grown to 16 percent in 2017.

== Declarations ==
Anti-LGBTQ resolutions were passed by some Polish gminas (municipalities), powiats (counties), and voivodeships (provinces), which declared themselves free from "LGBT ideology" in reaction to the Warsaw Declaration. While unenforceable, activists say the declared zones represent attempts to exclude the LGBTQ community, and called the declarations "a statement saying that a specific kind of people is not welcome there."

The two documents declared by municipalities were a "Local Government Charter of The Rights of The Family", and a "Resolution against LGBT ideology". Both of these documents were labelled in media as "declarations of LGBT-free zones", but neither of them actually contain a statement of exclusion of LGBTQ people from any territory, activities or rights. The "Charter of Family Rights" focuses on family values in social policies and only refers to LGBTQ rights indirectly, such as by defining marriage as a relationship "between a man and a woman". The "Resolution against LGBT ideology" opposes an "ideology of the LGBT movement" and introducing sex education in line with WHO education standards and condemns political correctness. An interactive map of Poland marking all municipalities which accepted either one or both of these resolutions, with links to their original texts, is available online, under the titles "Atlas of Hate".

In August 2019, around 30 different local governments have accepted such resolutions, including four voivodeships in the south-east of the country, namely Lesser Poland, Podkarpackie, Świętokrzyskie, and Lublin. The four Voivodeships form the "historically conservative" part of Poland. In February 2020, local governments controlling a third of Poland officially declared themselves as "against "LGBT ideology" or passed "pro-family" Charters, pledging to refrain from encouraging tolerance or funding NGOs working for LGBTQ rights.

=== Voivodeships (provinces) ===
1. Lublin Voivodeship, revoked by the voivodeship council on 27 September 2021
2. Lesser Poland Voivodeship, revoked by the voivodeship council on 27 September 2021
3. Podkarpackie Voivodeship, revoked by the voivodeship council on 27 September 2021
4. Świętokrzyskie Voivodeship, revoked by the voivodeship council on 22 September 2021
5. Łódź Voivodeship, revoked by the voivodeship council on 28 September 2021

=== Powiats (counties) ===
1. Powiat białobrzeski, revoked by powiat council on 7 September 2023.
2. Powiat białostocki, revoked by powiat council on 16 March 2023.
3. Powiat bielski, revoked by powiat council on 25 May 2023.
4. Powiat dębicki, revoked by powiat council on 28 March 2025.
5. Powiat jarosławski, revoked by powiat council on 31 March 2023.
6. Powiat kielecki, revoked by powiat council on 7 August 2023.
7. Powiat kolbuszowski, revoked by powiat council on 26 January 2023.
8. Powiat krasnostawski, revoked by powiat council on 29 November 2021.
9. Powiat kraśnicki, revoked by powiat council on 26 April 2023.
10. Powiat leski, revoked by powiat council on 5 April 2023.
11. Powiat limanowski, revoked by powiat council on 18 May 2023.
12. Powiat lubaczowski, revoked by powiat council on 28 October 2021.
13. Powiat lubelski, revoked by powiat council on 30 March 2023.
14. Powiat łańcucki, revoked by powiat council on 24 April 2025.
15. Powiat łowicki, revoked by powiat council on 30 August 2023.
16. Powiat łukowski, revoked by powiat council on 20 March 2023.
17. Powiat mielecki, revoked by powiat council on 2 October 2023.
18. Powiat nowotarski, revoked by powiat council on 30 March 2023.
19. Powiat opoczyński, revoked by powiat council on 26 September 2023.
20. Powiat przasnyski, revoked by powiat council on 25 October 2023.
21. Powiat przysuski, revoked by powiat council on 16 October 2023.
22. Powiat puławski, revoked by powiat council on 29 March 2023.
23. Powiat radomski, revoked by powiat council on 17 October 2023.
24. Powiat radzyński, revoked by powiat council on 28 March 2023.
25. Powiat rawski, revoked by powiat council on 5 June 2023.
26. Powiat rycki, revoked by powiat council on 25 April 2023.
27. Powiat sztumski, revoked by powiat council on 22 September 2020.
28. Powiat świdnicki, revoked by powiat council on 24 October 2023.
29. Powiat tarnowski, revoked by powiat council on 27 June 2023.
30. Powiat tatrzański, revoked by powiat council on 29 July 2024.
31. Powiat tomaszowski, revoked by powiat council on 7 December 2023.
32. Powiat wieluński, revoked by powiat council on 19 October 2023.
33. Powiat włoszczowski, revoked by powiat council on 16 August 2023.
34. Powiat zamojski, revoked by powiat council on 21 December 2022.

=== Gminas (municipalities) ===
1. Gromnik, revoked by gmina council on 28 April 2024.
2. Istebna, revoked by NSA on 28 June 2022.
3. Jordanów (gmina wiejska), revoked by the gmina council on 31 January 2023
4. Klwów, revoked by NSA on 28 June 2022.
5. Kraśnik, revoked by gmina council on 29 April 2021.
6. Końskowola, revoked by the gmina council on 1 February 2023.
7. Kock, revoked by WSA on 11 January 2021.
8. Konstantynów, revoked by gmina council on 14 March 2024.
9. Lipinki, revoked by gmina council on 29 May 2023.
10. Łososina Dolna, revoked by gmina council on 29 May 2023.
11. Mełgiew, revoked by gmina council on 30 March 2023.
12. Mordy, revoked by WSA on 6 February 2024.
13. Moszczenica, revoked by the gmina council on 29 December 2022.
14. Niebylec, revoked by NSA on 12 October 2023.
15. Osiek, revoked by NSA on 28 June 2022.
16. Ostrów Lubelski, revoked by the gmina council on 31 May 2023.
17. Poniatowa, revoked by the gmina council on 15 May 2023.
18. Potworów, revoked by the gmina council on 7 September 2023.
19. Przeworsk, revoked by the gmina council on 28 December 2022.
20. Radziechowy-Wieprz, revoked on 11 September 2020 by the voivode of the Silesian Voivodeship, Jarosław Wieczorek.
21. Skierniewice, revoked by the gmina council on 16 February 2024.
22. Szczytniki, revoked by the gmina council on 15 June 2023.
23. Świdnik, revoked by the gmina council on 29 December 2022.
24. Stary Zamość, revoked by the gmina council on 17 May 2023.
25. Serniki, revoked by NSA on 28 June 2022.
26. Szerzyny revoked by the gmina council on 30 March 2023.
27. Trzebieszów, revoked by the gmina council on 30 March 2023.
28. Tuchów, revoked by the gmina council on 27 October 2021.
29. Tuszów Narodowy, revoked by the gmina council on 17 August 2023.
30. Urzędów, revoked by the gmina council on 26 April 2023.
31. Wilkołaz, revoked by the gmina council on 30 March 2023.
32. Zwierzyniec, revoked by the gmina council on 29 May 2023.
33. Zarzecze, revoked by the gmina council on 15 December 2021.
34. Zakrzówek, revoked by the gmina council on 4 October 2023.

== Anti-LGBT stickers and pro-LGBT public art activism ==
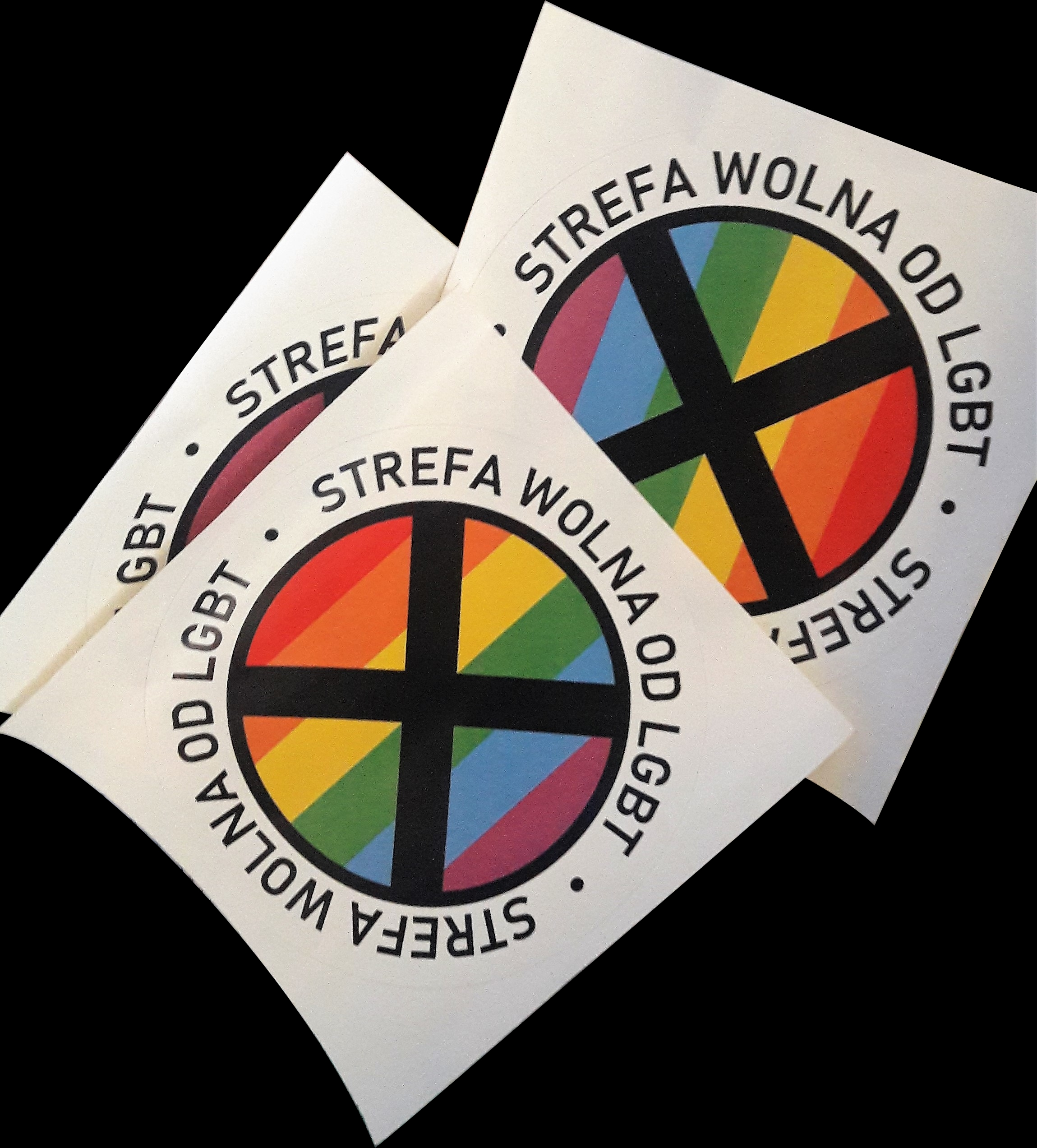
Gazeta Polska's "LGBT-free zone" stickers

"Hate free zone" stickers printed by Campaign Against Homophobia and distributed by Replika

In July 2019, the conservative Gazeta Polska newspaper issued "LGBT-free zone" stickers to readers. The Polish opposition and diplomats, including US ambassador to Poland Georgette Mosbacher, condemned the stickers. Gazeta Polska editor in chief Tomasz Sakiewicz replied to the criticism by stating that "what is happening is the best evidence that LGBT is a totalitarian ideology."

The Warsaw district court ordered that distribution of the stickers should halt pending the resolution of a court case. Gazeta Polska's editor dismissed the ruling saying it was "fake news" and censorship, and that the paper would continue distributing the stickers. Gazeta Polska continued distribution of the stickers, but modified the decal to read "LGBT Ideology-Free Zone".

Poland's Campaign Against Homophobia responded by issuing 5,000 "hate-free zone" stickers distributed in gay magazine Replika. In July, Polish media chain Empik, the country's largest, refused to stock Gazeta Polska after it issued the stickers. In August 2019, a show organized by the Gazeta Polska Community of America scheduled for October 24 in Carnegie Hall in New York was cancelled after complaints of anti-LGBTQ ties led to artists pulling out of the show.

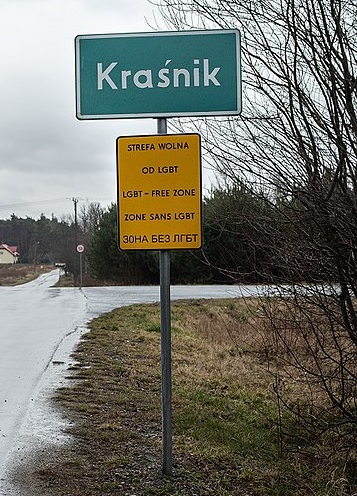
One of the Staszewski art installations portraying a municipality as what he calls an "LGBT-free zone"

In early 2020, Polish LGBTQ activist Bartosz Staszewski travelled to municipalities that had said they are free from what they referred to as "LGBT ideology" to undertake what he said was a performance art project. He affixed his own yellow street signs saying "LGBT-FREE ZONE" at the entrance to the municipalities, and posted photos of them to social media.

The signs were so convincing that MEP Guy Verhofstadt responded by denouncing what he had mistaken for official street signage. Prime Minister Mateusz Morawiecki described the signs as a "hoax" that had caused people to believe Poland was violating human rights, and Staszewski has been sued by at least two of the towns. Staszewski described his work as "a symbolic response to the symbolic resolutions".

In a debate between Polish conservative Witold Waszczykowski and German liberal Alexander Graf Lambsdorff published in Zeit Online, Waszczykowski attributed the concept of the "LGBT-free zone" to the activism. He said: "There are no "LGBT-free zones" in Poland. This is a provocation created by activists. They travel from town to town, put up these signs reading "LGBT-free zone", take pictures and circulate them on social media. Zeit replied: "Indeed, there is no "LGBT-free zone" by definition, but there are more than 80 county, city and regional councils that have adopted so-called family charters. In many cases these charters say that there should be no propaganda of a so-called "LGBT ideology" and they also state that "LGBT ideology" contradicts Christian values".

== Demonstrations ==
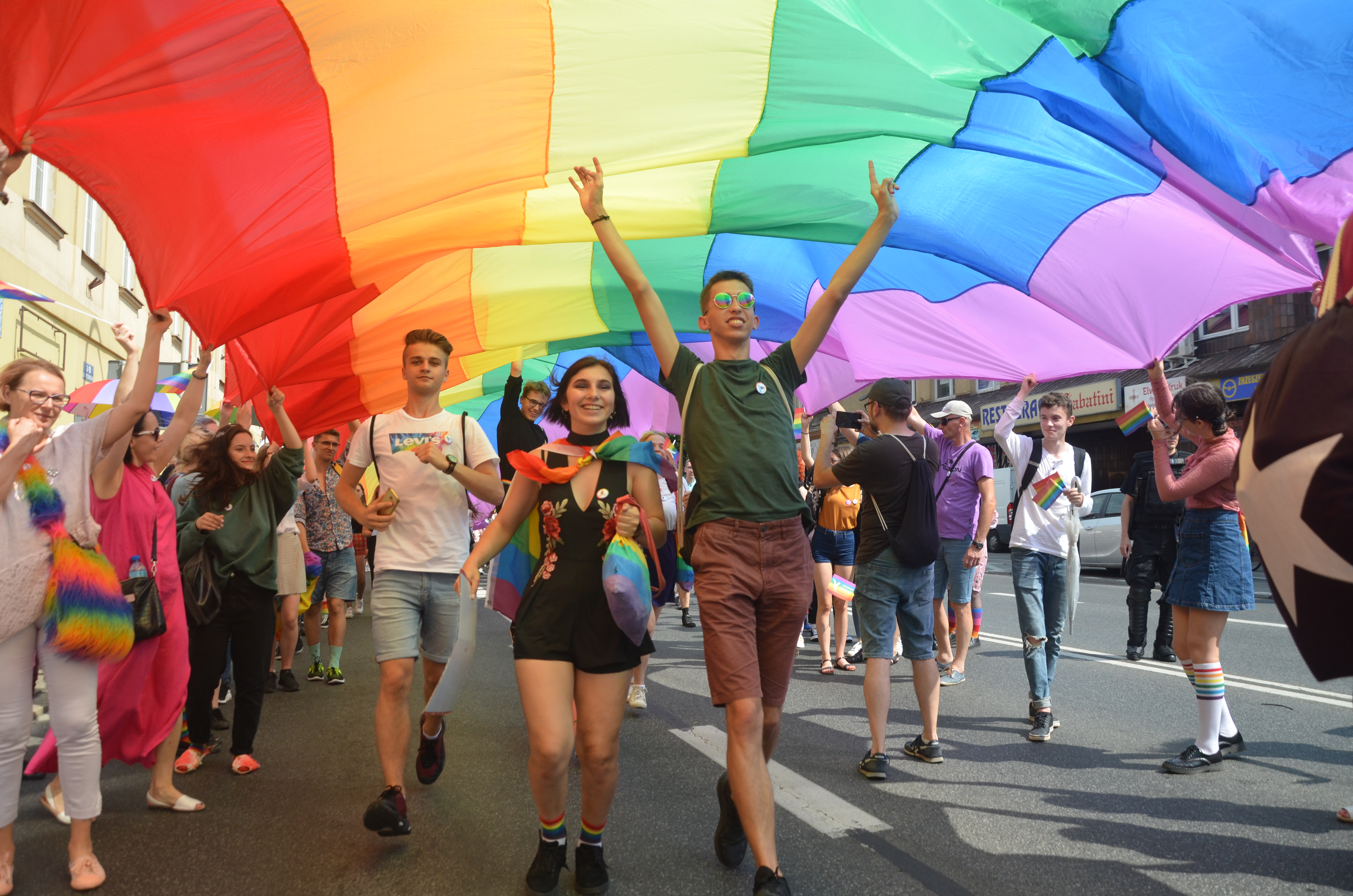
Marching under a large rainbow flag canopy at 2019 Rzeszów equality march.

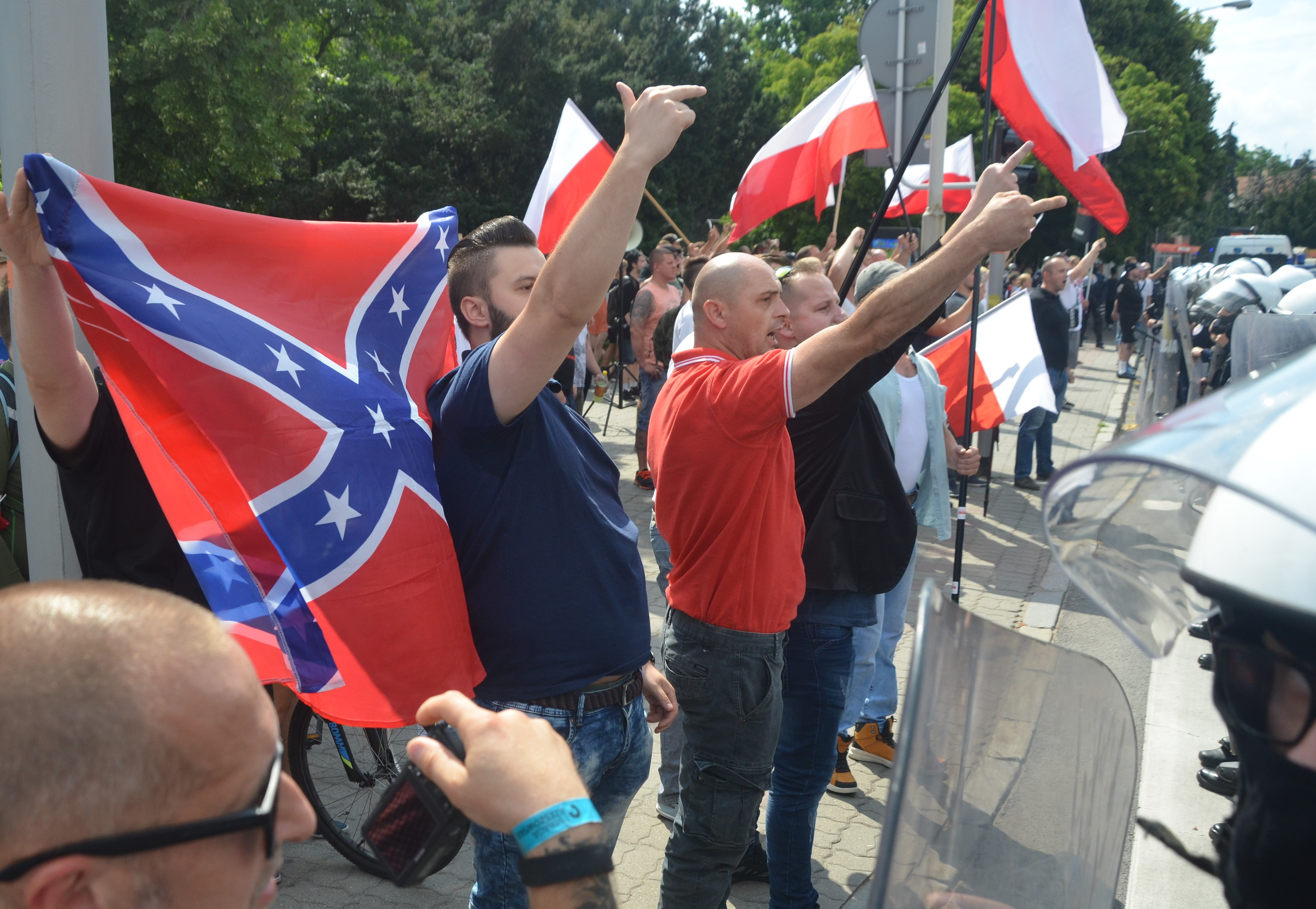
Nationalists counter-protesting the Rzeszów equality march, holding the Confederate battle flag

In Rzeszów, after LGBTQ activists submitted a request to hold an equality march for gay rights in June 2019, PiS councillors drafted a resolution to make Rzeszów an "LGBT-free zone" as well as outlaw the event itself. Some 29 requests for counter-demonstrations reached city hall, which led mayor Tadeusz Ferenc, of the opposition Democratic Left Alliance, to ban the march due to security concerns. When the ban was then overturned by a court ruling, PiS councillors put forward a resolution outlawing "LGBT ideology", which was defeated by two votes.

Following the violent events in the first Białystok equality march, as well as the Gazeta Polska stickers, a demonstration for tolerance was held in Gdańsk on 23 July 2019, with the slogan "zone free of zones" (Polish: Strefa wolna od stref). In Szczecin a demonstration under the slogan of "hate-free zone" (Polish: Strefa wolna od nienawiści) took place, and in Łódź left-wing politicians handed out "hate-free zone" stickers.

== Effects on LGBT residents ==
According to a December 2020 report by the Council of Europe Commissioner for Human Rights:

Far from being merely words on paper, these declarations and charters directly impact the lives of LGBTI people in Poland. The Commissioner has heard testimonies about the chilling effect of these documents on residents and institutions, who are increasingly reluctant to be associated with any activity related to the human rights of LGBTI people for fear of reprisals or loss of funds. The Commissioner was told that some media outlets which have reported on these documents have been targeted by legal action, leading some of them to exercise self-censorship. She has also been told about cases of LGBTI residents being refused services by local businesses (e.g. a pharmacy) or organisations being denied the opportunity to hold LGBTI awareness-raising events. Activists working to denounce such declarations have also been subjected to specious lawsuits filed by local governments or conservative organisations and a smear campaign labelling them as liars for using creative advocacy tools, the clear intention being to intimidate and silence them. The Commissioner has received reports of many LGBTI people being shunned by fellow residents.

== Reactions ==
=== Support for declarations ===
Bożena Bieryło, a PiS councilwoman in Białystok County, said the legislation in Białystok county was required due to LGBTQ "provocations" and "demands" for sex education instruction. The national PiS party encouraged the local declarations, with a PiS official handing out medals in Lublin to local politicians who supported the declarations.

=== Criticism of declarations ===
In July 2019, Polish Ombudsman Adam Bodnar stated that "the government is increasing homophobic sentiments" with remarks "on the margins of hate speech". Bodnar said he is preparing an appeal to the administrative court against the declarations, as according to Bodnar they are not only political but also have a normative character that affects the lives of people in the declared region. In July 2019, Warsaw city Councillor Marek Szolc and the Polish Society for Anti-Discrimination Law (PTPA) released a legal opinion stating that LGBT-free zone declarations stigmatize and exclude people, reminding everyone of article 32 of the Constitution of Poland which guarantees equality and lack of discrimination. In August 2019, multiple LGBTQ community members stated that they feel unsafe in Poland. The left-wing Razem party stated: "Remember how the right [were scared] of the so-called [Muslim] no-go zones? Thanks to the same right, we have our own no-go zones."

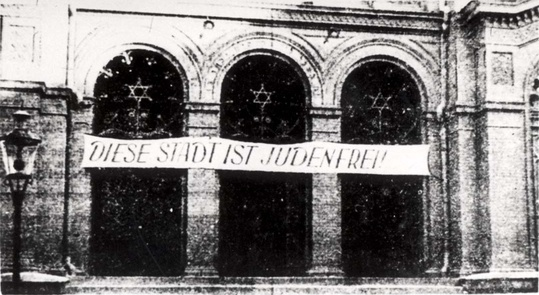
Synagogue in Bydgoszcz, German-occupied Poland, 1939. Nazi banner proclaiming city is judenfrei (free of Jews). This image was tweeted by a representative of Robert Biedroń's party in response to the LGBT-free zones.

Liberal politicians and media and human rights activists have compared the declarations to Nazi-era declarations of areas being judenfrei ("free of Jews"). The left-leaning Italian newspaper la Repubblica called it "a concept that evokes the term 'Judenfrei'". Campaign Against Homophobia director Slava Melnyk compared the declarations to "1933, when there were also free zones from a specific group of people." Warsaw's deputy president Paweł Rabiej tweeted, "The German fascists created zones free of Jews. Apartheid, of blacks." In March 2020, BBC Radio 4 broadcast a documentary on the opposition of the LGBTQ community in Poland against the introduction of LGBT-free zones in the country. In April 2020, during the COVID-19 pandemic, many within the LGBTQ community began handing out rainbow facemasks and other P.P.E. as a direct protest of the "LGBT-free zoning" within certain local government areas of Poland.

On 17 August 2020, an open letter to the European Commission president Ursula von der Leyen, was published urging the European Union "to take immediate steps in defense of basic European values ... which have been violated in Poland" and expressing "a deep concern over the future of democracy in Poland". It also appealed to the Polish government to stop targeting sexual minorities as enemies and to withdraw support from organizations promoting homophobia. The signatories of the letter included among others: Pedro Almodóvar, Timothy Garton Ash, Margaret Atwood, John Banville, Judith Butler, J. M. Coetzee, Stephen Daldry, Luca Guadagnino, Ed Harris, Agnieszka Holland, Isabelle Huppert, Jan Komasa, Yorgos Lanthimos, Mike Leigh, Paweł Pawlikowski, Volker Schlöndorff, Stellan Skarsgård, Timothy Snyder, Olga Tokarczuk, Adam Zagajewski, and Slavoj Žižek.

In September 2020, the American presidential candidate Joe Biden also condemned LGBT-free zones in Poland via Twitter stating that "LGBTQ+ rights are human rights — and 'LGBT-free zones' have no place in the European Union or anywhere in the world". The Polish embassy in Washington, D.C. replied that Biden's Tweet had been "based on inaccurate media information, as no 'LGBT-free zones' exist in Poland." The Atlas of Hate organization, which keeps track of the anti-LGBTQ resolutions, was nominated for the Sakharov Prize by 43 MEPs. In 2023, the watchdog group ILGA-Europe identified Poland's respect for LGBTI rights as the worst of all 27 EU countries.

=== Reaction from the European Union ===
On 18 December 2019, the European Parliament voted (463 to 107) in favour of condemning the more than 80 LGBT-free zones in Poland. Parliament demanded that "Polish authorities (are) to condemn these acts and (are) to revoke all resolutions attacking LGBT rights". According to the EU Parliament, the zones are part of "a broader context of attacks against the LGBT community in Poland, which include growing hate speech by public and elected officials and public media, as well as attacks and bans on Pride marches and actions such as 'Rainbow Fridays'.".

Based upon numerous complaints that "some local governments have adopted discriminatory declarations and resolutions targeting LGBT people", the European Commission wrote to the governors of five Voivodeships – Lublin, Łódź, Lesser Poland, Podkarpackie, and Świętokrzyskie – on 2 June 2020, instructing them to investigate local resolutions proclaiming LGBT-free zones or a "Charter of Family Rights", and whether such resolutions constituted discriminatory actions towards LGBTQ-identifying people or not. The letter can be seen as an extension of the 2019 vote in the European Parliament condemning the zones, as it notes that failure by Poland to adhere to common values of the European Union of "respect for human dignity, freedom, democracy, equality, the rule of law and respect for human rights, including the rights of persons belonging to minorities", as stated in Article 2 of the 2012 European Union Treaty could result in the loss of EU funds granted to the Republic of Poland in the future, such as European Structural and Investment.

In July 2020, Commissioner Dalli announced that applications for EU-funded town twinnings from six Polish towns had been rejected because of their adoption of "LGBT-free" or "family rights" resolutions. In her September 2020 State of the European Union speech, Ursula von der Leyen stated, "LGBTQI-free zones are humanity-free zones. And they have no place in our Union." In March 2021, on the initiative of the French MEP Pierre Karleskind, the European Parliament declared the entire European Union an "LGBTIQ Freedom Zone" in response to the democratic backsliding including of LGBTIQ rights in some EU countries, notably in Poland and Hungary. In September 2021, the European Commission sent letters to several Polish regional councils indicating that EU funds would be withdrawn if they do not abandon their LGBT-free zone policy.

The European Commission blocked €150 million funds for LGBTQ-free zones, and also blocked a 42 billion Euro payment from the COVID-19 recovery fund, due to Poland not obeying EU law. In January 2023, the Polish town of Świdnik abolished their LGBT-free zone in response to fearing that they would stop receiving EU subsidies. In February 2023, the European Commission ended its legal action against the LGBT-free zones. In May 2023, the European Commission said that the LGBT-free zones would stop receiving EU funding if they continue their policies.

=== International agreements ===
In February 2020, the French commune of Saint-Jean-de-Braye decided to suspend the partnership with the Polish city of Tuchów as a result of the controversial anti-LGBTQ resolution passed by the Tuchów authorities. In February 2020, the French commune of Nogent-sur-Oise suspended its partnership with the Polish city of Kraśnik as a reaction to the passing of an anti-LGBTQ resolution by the city authorities. In February 2020, the French region of Centre-Val de Loire suspended its partnership with the Lesser Poland Voivodeship as a response to the establishment of an "LGBT-free zone" resolution by the voivodeship's authorities. In May 2020, the German city of Schwerte ended its city partnership with the Polish city of Nowy Sącz after 30 years of cooperation due to the town's adoption of a resolution discriminating against LGBTQ people. In July 2020, the Dutch city of Nieuwegein as well as the French city of Douai ended their twin city agreements with the Polish city of Puławy due to a "gay free zone" proclamation made in the latter. On 12 October 2020, the Irish city of Fermoy ended its twin town agreement with Nowa Dęba after 14 years of cooperation as a reaction to the homophobic LGBT-free zone declaration adopted by the Polish city's authorities. On 13 November 2020, the Belgian municipality of Puurs-Sint-Amands suspended its 20-year-long partnership with the Polish town of Dębica because of the town's adoption of the Charter of The Rights of The Family, which discriminates LGBTQ people.

In July 2020, the European Commissioner for Justice and Equality Helena Dalli announced that six Polish cities which adopted the "LGBT-free zones" would not be granted EU funds related to financing projects within the EU twinning project framework as a direct consequence of their discriminatory policies directed against members of the LGBTQ community. The decision met with criticism from the Minister of Justice Zbigniew Ziobro, however, the President of the European Commission Ursula von der Leyen defended the decision adding that "Our treaties ensure that every person in Europe is free to be who they are, live where they like, love who they want, and aim as high as they want." However, on 18 August, Justice Minister Zbigniew Ziobro announced that the town of Tuchów in southern Poland would now receive 250,000 zlotys ($67,800) from the ministry's Justice Fund, to compensate for the EU funding reversal.

In September 2020, Ine Marie Eriksen Søreide, the Norwegian Minister of Foreign Affairs, announced that the Polish municipalities which introduced the LGBT-free zones would be denied the EEA and Norway Grants whose aim is the reduction of social and economic disparities in the European Economic Area (EEA). Poland is the biggest beneficiary of these funds and could potentially lose millions of euros of financial aid. The suspension of funds only applies to the government bodies that have themselves adopted resolutions and does not apply to non-governmental organizations that operate in the LGBT-free zones. In September 2020, a group of MEPs published a letter addressed to the European Olympic Committees (EOC) in which they demanded to respect the rights of LGBTI athletes and expressed an idea to host the 2023 European Games, which had been scheduled to take place in Kraków, in a different location due to the region's LGBT-free zone status.

=== Repeal and cancellation of anti-LGBT declarations ===
In September 2021, three Polish regions repealed their own anti-LGBTQ declarations in response to the threat of a funding freeze from the EU, due to its anti-discrimination laws. In June 2022, following appeal from four voivodeship administrative courts, which issued the decisions numbered 4028/21, 4240/21, 3746/21, and 4041/21, and annulled resolutions relating to LGBT-free zones in 2020, the Supreme Administrative Court of Poland dismissed the appeals, agreeing with the voivodeship court's decision to remove the zones.

== See also ==
- Anti-gender movement
- Rainbow Night
- Backlash (sociology)
- Censorship of LGBT issues
- Crime of apartheid
- Group Areas Act
- Judenfrei
- LGBT agenda
- LGBT history in Poland
- LGBT rights in Poland
- Moral panic
- Opposition to LGBT rights
- Political activity of the Catholic Church on LGBT issues in Poland
- No kid zone
