= Sylwester Zawadzki =

Sylwester Zawadzki may refer to:

- Sylwester Zawadzki (lawyer) (1921–1999), president of Supreme Administrative Court of Poland (1980–1981)
- Sylwester Zawadzki (priest) (1932–2014), Polish priest who led the construction of Christ the King Statue, Świebodzin
