= Aleksander Zawadzki (disambiguation) =

Aleksander Zawadzki (1899–1964) was a Polish Communist Party leader and head of state.

Aleksander Zawadzki may also refer to:

- Aleksander Zawadzki (naturalist) (1798–1868), Polish naturalist
- Aleksander Zawadzki (activist) (1859–1926), Polish political and educational activist

== See also ==
- Zawadzki (surname)
