= Central committee =

Common title for the highest organ of communist parties between congresses

A central committee is a political-executive organ designated as the highest organ of a communist party between two congresses. Per the principles of democratic centralism, a central committee is empowered to deal with any issue that falls under the party's purview. While formally retaining this role in socialist states, commonly referred to as communist states by outside observers, in practice, it delegates this authority to numerous smaller internal organs due to the infrequency of its meetings.

The term of a central committee of a ruling communist party is usually five years. The party congress elects individuals to the central committee and holds it accountable. At the first central committee session held immediately after a congress, it elects the party leader, an office usually titled general secretary of the central committee, a political organ, commonly known as the politburo, and an executive organ, customarily named the secretariat.

== Status ==
Communist parties are organised on Leninist lines based on the principles of democratic centralism. Adolf Dobieszewski, an official of the Central Committee of the Polish United Workers' Party (PUWP), tried to define democratic centralism in 1980. He posited that centralism involves unifying party building and policy to construct a socialist society. To achieve unity in party building and policy, Dobieszewski contended that the minority had to be subordinate to the majority. Secondly, he posited that lower-level organs were subservient to higher-level organs. Third, members willingly acquiesced to discipline, and political discipline was equally obligatory for all party members. Democracy, on the other hand, meant, according to Dobieszewski, that every member had equal opportunity to participate in the formulation of the party's programme and line, as well as the right to elect and recall officials at all levels.

Power was organised as a uniform structure, with the highest party organs, such as the congress, functioning as the party's "supreme organ". This supreme organ is responsible for electing the central committee, which is typically tasked with directing the work of the communist party in between two congresses. According to scholar Baruch Hazan, the former ruling Eastern European communist parties provided nearly identical descriptions of the functions and powers of their central committees. Their responsibilities included representing the party externally, organising party organs, directing their activities, nominating personnel for internal organs, evaluating party cadres, and administering internal funds. Additionally, they were responsible for overseeing the work of state organs, granting approval to the state plan and budget ahead of the discussions in the supreme state organ of power (SSOP), and endorsing the appointments of individuals to prominent state roles. However, more generally, central committees are empowered to deal with any issue that falls under the party's purview.

=== Relationship to the state ===
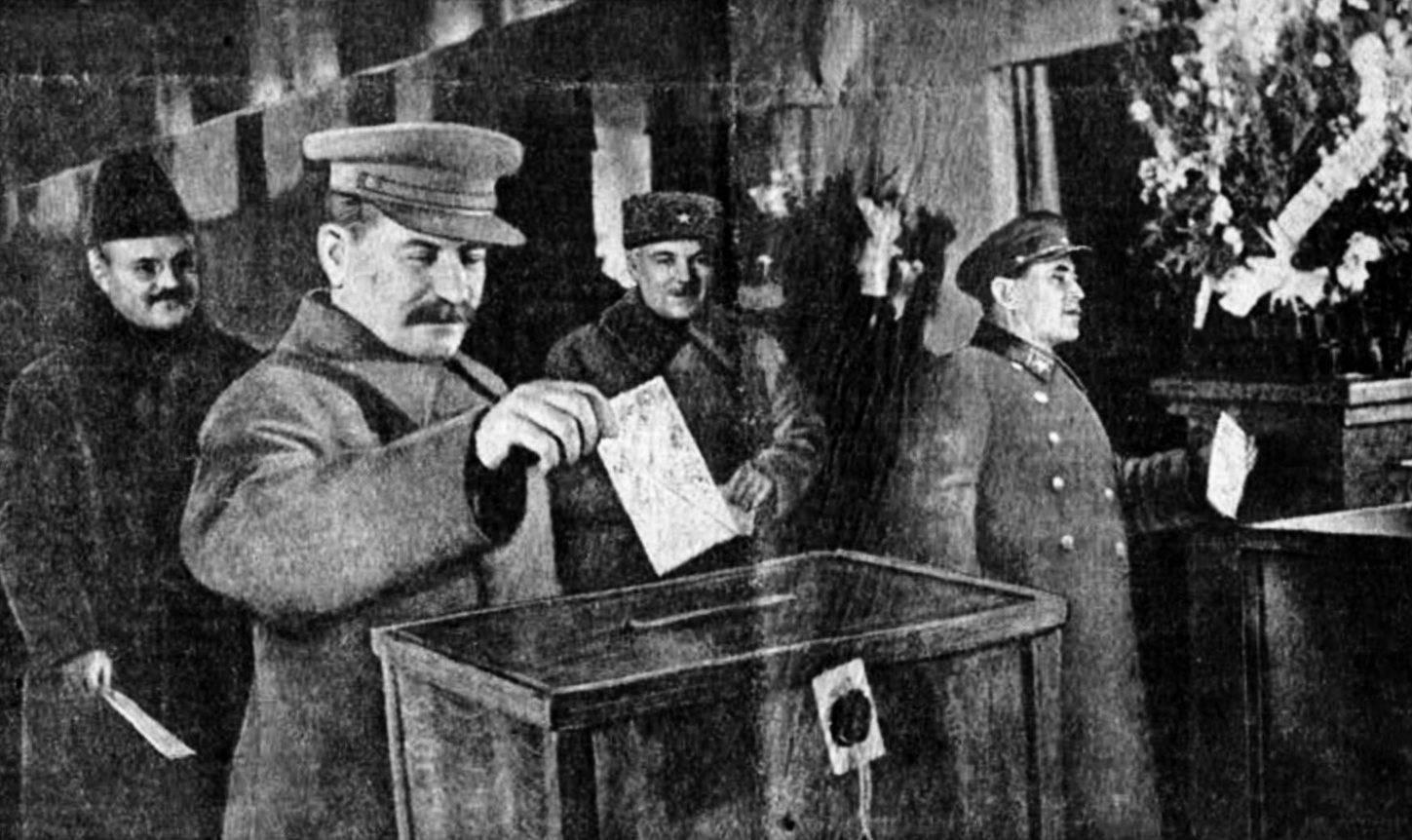
Soviet Central Committee members (from left to right) Vyacheslav Molotov, Joseph Stalin, Kliment Voroshilov and Nikolai Yezhov partaking the 1937 election of deputies to the Supreme Soviet in the Soviet Union.

Most communist states formally enshrine the communist party's leading or guiding role in state and society, and this is institutionalised by giving the party two-thirds of the seats in the supreme state organ of power (SSOP), which has complete control over all state activities per the principle of unified power. These members are, in most cases, elected in non-competitive elections and stand as candidates on the approval of the central committee.

Many central committee members also serve concurrently as members of their nation's supreme state organ (SSOP). In the Soviet Union, 227 out of 241 members of the Central Committee of the 24th Congress of the Communist Party of the Soviet Union (CPSU) concurrently served in the Supreme Soviet of the Soviet Union. They tended to dominate the Supreme Soviet and occupied leading political positions within it. In 1971–1973, forty per cent of debate participants were either members or alternates of the central committee. Party members who serve in the supreme state organ are also bound by party discipline and have to enact policies approved by the central committee.

The leading role principle entails that the central committee adopts recommendations on state policy on behalf of the party to, most commonly, the supreme state organ (SSOP), but also to other state organs if deemed necessary. For instance, the Central Committee of the Hungarian Socialist Workers' Party (HSWP) "adopted recommendations for filling of jobs in the state apparatus" to Hungary's SSOP, the National Assembly, on 29 March 1979. In other instances, the central committee could instruct its members to resign from state offices. The 7th Session of the Central Committee of the 8th PUWP Congress, held on 1–2 December 1980, instructed Edward Babiuch, Jerzy Łukaszewicz, Tadeusz Pyka, Jan Szydlak, Tadeusz Wraszczyk, and Zdzisław Zandarowski to resign their seats in the Sejm, the SSOP in the People's Republic of Poland, and instructing its former leader, Edward Gierek, to resign from his seat in the State Council.

The central committee could also nominate individuals to state positions. On 11 April 1984, during the 1st Session of the 11th Supreme Soviet of the Soviet Union, Mikhail Gorbachev nominated Konstantin Chernenko as chairman of the Presidium of the Supreme Soviet of the Soviet Union "on instructions of the Central Committee". Upon his election, Chernenko nominated Nikolai Tikhonov as chairman of the Council of Ministers, the Soviet government, also on the instructions of the Central Committee. Moreover, Chernenko and Gorbachev both stated that the instruction had also been "approved by the party group" of the Supreme Soviet.

Marxist constitutional theorist Sylwester Zawadzki, and member of Poland's SSOP, the Sejm, defined the relationship between the party and state as follows, "The Marxist-Leninist party gives political direction to the work of both the [SSOP] and the Government. [SSOP] and Government both work to carry out a common program for building socialism. It does not mean, however, that under these conditions the importance of the [SSOP's] constitutional functions is reduced."

In practice, the party's central committee normally discusses and adopts the state plan and budget before the supreme state organ does. On 25 November 1981, the RCP Central Committee convened to discuss and adopt the state plan and budget. Two days later, on 27 November, the Romanian SSOP, the Great National Assembly, convened and adopted the central committee's proposals. Moreover, the speakers that spoke at the central committee sessions usually speak at the session of the SSOP. Very few debates occur during the SSOP session, and in most cases, these organs adopt the central committee's recommendations unanimously. This was not always the case. The Assembly of Yugoslavia rejected bills, the Polish Sejm voted against government appointments and, under Gorbachev's leadership, the Congress of People's Deputies and the Supreme Soviet regularly voted contrary to the wishes of the Soviet government and party leaders.

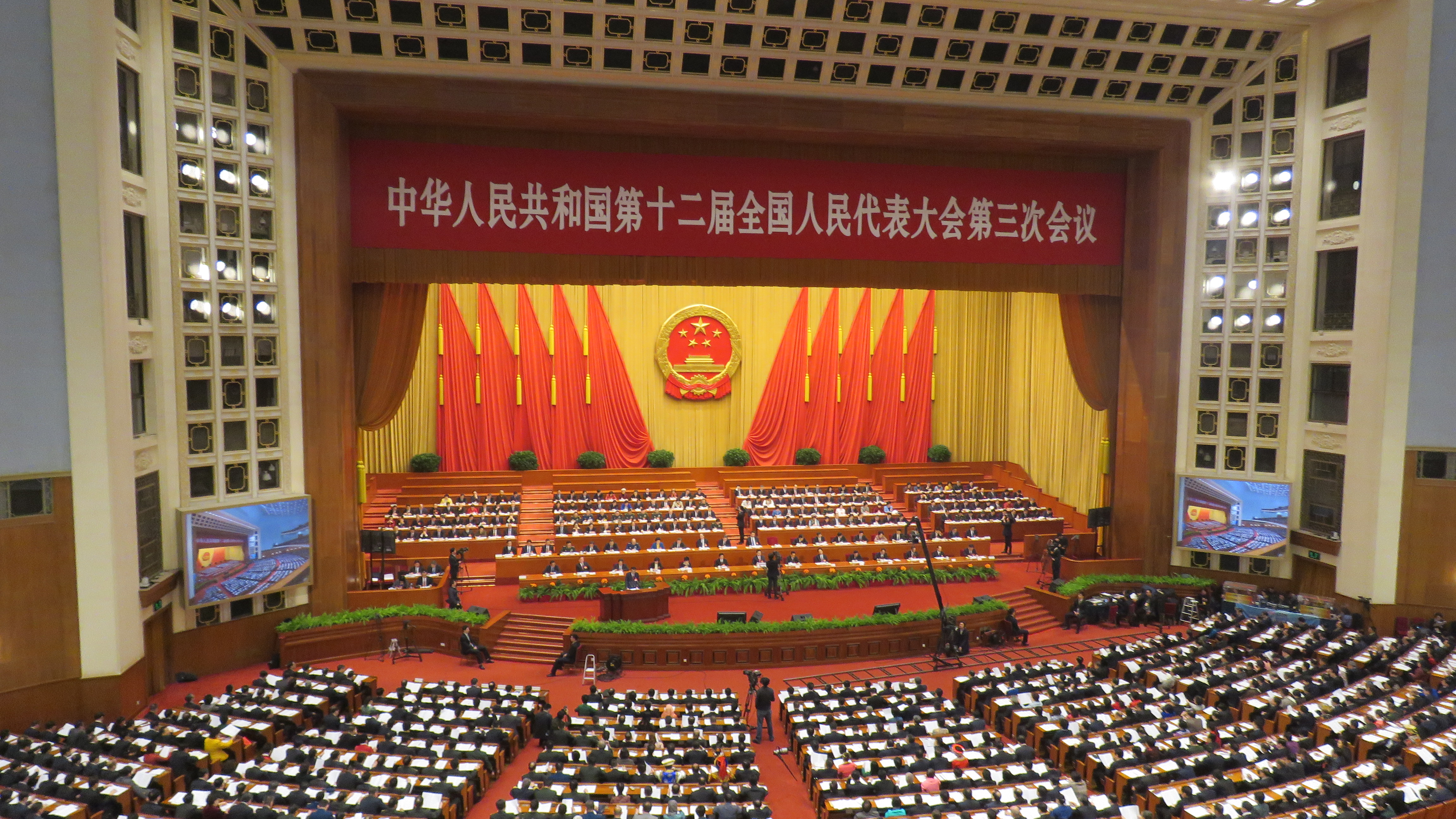
The opening day (5 March 2015) of the 3rd Session of the 12th National People's Congress, the SSOP in China.

There have been several attempts to reform the relationship between the central committee and the SSOP. In China, according to scholar Anthony Saich, "the party cannot guarantee absolute support [in the SSOP] and has accepted a looser form of control than during the Maoist days when the National People's Congress (NPC) was simply stocked with model workers and peasants, pliant intellectuals and senior party leaders."

The first reforms were instituted in 1991, when the Central Committee of the Chinese Communist Party (CCP) adopted a regulation that limited the party's interference in the work of China's SSOP, the National People's Congress. The document clarifies that the CCP has the right to review all proposed laws, but detailed scrutiny of articles and other legal features should be left to the NPC.

In line with this, the number of negative votes by NPC deputies against proposed legislation and candidates has increased since 1991. The NPC has also rejected proposed legislation, such as the "Highway Law of the People's Republic of China" in 1999 and the "Property Law of the People's Republic of China" in 2006. In both cases, the proposed legislation was amended and passed at a later date.

In some cases, the central committee adopts decisions on behalf of state organs despite it not being in their jurisdiction. This occurred at a session of the Central Committee of the Communist Party of Czechoslovakia (CPCZ) on 13–14 September 1979 when it removed Jan Gregor, Frantisek Hamouz and Bohuslav Vecera from their government posts. Another example is the Extraordinary Plenary Session of Poland's PUWP Central Committee on 9 February 1981 that removed Józef Pińkowski, the sitting head of government, and replaced him with Wojciech Jaruzelski.

== Organisation ==
=== Sessions ===
Ruling central committees normally can convene for three meeting types: sessions (also called plenums), extraordinary sessions, and joint sessions. These three types have two sub-forms: a closed session and an enlarged session in which non-members are invited to participate. Central committee sessions dealing with non-party issues are often enlarged, even if what is discussed is routine in nature.

These sessions are in most cases organised identically, and the key speech is often delivered by a central committee secretary responsible, for example, for economic affairs or international affairs. The discussions at the sessions are very seldom made public, but adopted resolutions are sometimes made public and session communiques are nearly always distributed to the public. In some instances, the number of non-members exceeds that of central committee members. The Romanian Communist Party (RCP) did this, and the Central Committee of the 12th RCP Congress convened an enlarged session on 1 June 1982 attended by 360 guests to discuss the "current stage of building socialism in Romania".

Sessions dealing exclusively with party affairs are usually closed. These sessions' most common agenda item is "organisational matters", meaning personnel changes in party and state organs. The communiques published by these sessions are usually brief and say little to nothing about the reason for the changes. But this was not abnormal. For instance, in East Germany, the official communique of the 13th Session of the Central Committee of the 7th Congress of the Socialist Unity Party of Germany (SED), held on 11–12 December 1980, only notes that two politburo members, Günter Mittag and Gerhard Schürer, spoke at the session, that fifteen central committee members participated in session discussions and that it approved the SED Politburo's report and the proposed economic plan for 1981.

The same rule regards extraordinary sessions, both ordinary and enlarged, as well. In some cases, these sessions were made public long after the fact. For example, the Central Committee of the Bulgarian Communist Party (BCP) reported that an "important" Central Committee session had taken place 1–2 July 1976, but only informed the public that "measures to ensure the consistent and all-round implementation of the decisions of the 11th BCP Congress" had been adopted and discussed. What these measures were was not made public. The importance of the session was indicated by the fact that Todor Zhivkov, the first secretary of the BCP Central Committee, "read a detailed report" to the session. However, the report's content was not made public either.

Despite the meeting's secretive nature, and the low level of transparency about it, Bulgaria's BCP Central Committee's main newspaper Rabotnichesko delo wrote, "the entire population is called upon to fulfill the 'program' contained in the report." That is, the Bulgarian people were called to participate in implementing resolutions they were not acquainted with. In other more extreme cases, details of the "historic" central committee were kept a secret. For instance, the contents of the BCP Central Committee session on 17 April 1956 that removed Valko Chervenkov as general secretary were deemed too sensitive to be published even thirty years after the event took place.

Central committee sessions could also produce transparent communiques and resolutions. Scholar Hazan contends, "As a rule, this is only the case after a routine [session], when nothing unusual has happened." These communiques were structured similarly throughout the communist world. Such sessions usually dealt with public matters, such as the economic plan and the state budget. For example, Hungary's HSWP Central Committee session held on 3 December 1981 transparently informed about which guests participated in the session and specifically stated what was discussed. In this, the communique stated, "The Central Committee discussed and approved: a report submitted by Comrade Andreas Gyenes, secretary of the Central Committee, on topical international issues; and a proposal submitted by Comrade Ferenc Havasi, member of the Politburo and secretary of the Central Committee, on guiding principles for the 1982 plan and state budget." The ensuing communique summarised the international policy stance of the HSWP and outlined the basic features of the 1982 plan and budget.

However, in other instances, the session makes public the resolutions adopted. For instance, Romania's RCP Central Committee session on 9 February 1982 made public the resolution on "Resetting of Prices and Augmentation of Remuneration of Working Personnel". According to Hazan, the RCP Central Committee took this move to help justify the price increases to the population.

In other cases, as with the Poland's PUWP Central Committee sessions from 1980 to 1982 and those of the LCY more generally, the agenda and proceedings of the sessions were made entirely public. In the PUWP, proceedings were aired live by state radio and television, while in Yugoslavia, public broadcasting of central committee sessions had been a normal occurrence since the early 1950s. For example, the 3rd Extraordinary Session of the Central Committee of the 6th LCY Congress, held on 16–17 January 1954, was both publicly broadcast and made public in written form in the LCY Central Committee's theoretical journal, Komunist. This is against the norm in most communist parties as the majority of them did, and still do, keep proceedings secret.

Sessions have, on several occasions, produced documents of an authoritative ideological nature. For instance, Romania's RCP Central Committee session of 25 March 1981 clarified the party's foreign affairs policy and how it differed from other Eastern European communist parties. In other situations, as was a normal occurrence in former communist Europe (bar Yugoslavia), the central committee convened to express support for Soviet foreign policy. This occurred at Czechoslovakia's Central Committee session on 21 April 1982, where Vasiľ Biľak, a member of the CPCZ Presidium, accused the United States of being an anti-Soviet state that refused "to reconcile itself to the fact that it has lost its dominating position in the world policy and economy". The session made clear its support for "The Soviet peace initiatives aim at averting the danger of a world nuclear war" which it argued corresponded "to the vital interests and peace wishes of the Czechoslovak people."

=== Working organs ===
A central committee, not always the case in non-ruling parties, has two components: one composed of elected officials and another composed of non-elected officials. The non-elected officials compose the working organs of the central committee, which makes up the central committee apparatus. The activity of a central committee is constant and does not cease in between its sessions. The central committee usually has several internal departments, commissions, committees, newspapers and other organs working continuously when not in session. These organisational sub-units do everything from greeting foreign delegations, issuing regulations, monitoring the party as a whole and preparing agenda items and dossiers for politburo meetings.

Because of the central committee's role in the political system of communist states, foreign observers often state that it has functions resembling parliaments in liberal democracies. For example, the central committee apparatus of the former communist ruling parties of Europe had twenty to thirty organisational subunits that covered everything from foreign relations and trade to sports and science, similar to parliamentary special committees.

Some organisational units are deemed party secrets and not publicly acknowledged. Many organisational units are shared by all communist parties, such as having organisational units for agitation and propaganda and organisation. At the same time, others are unique, such as the Department of Western Affairs of East Germany's SED Central Committee. These organs are supervised by the secretariat, and this institutional function is usually vaguely stated in the party statute. The difference between elected and non-elected personnel in the apparatus is blurred, according to scholars Jerry F. Hough and Merle Fainsod, and using the Communist Party of the Soviet Union (CPSU) as an example, since "each secretary has responsibility for one or more departments, and hence the departmental officials work as the staff assistants of the secretaries."

The working organs are often organised on branch lines. For example, the Soviet Union's CPSU Central Committee had the Administrative Organs Department responsible for supervising the works of the ministries of Civil Aviation, Defence and the KGB, while the Chinese Communist Party has a Publicity Department responsible for supervising party and state media across China. Outside of these departments, central committees usually have other units as well, such as a publishing house, party schools, scholarly institutes and a capital construction section, for example. The leaders of these working organs are usually called "heads". The Secretariat is organised on similar lines as the working organs. In some instances, the secretaries head working organs in tandem with their supervisory responsibilities.

Examples of central committee working organs in China, the Soviet Union and East Germany
Organ type	Communist Party of the Soviet Union organ	Chinese Communist Party organ	Socialist Unity Party organ
Administrative	General Department	General Office	Office of the Politburo
Economic	Chemical Industry Department	Office of the Central Financial Commission	Planning and Finances Department
Foreign affairs	International Department	International Department	International Politics and Economics Department
Ideological	Propaganda Department	Publicity Department	Propaganda Department
Institutes	Institute of Marxism-Leninism	Institute of Party History and Literature	Institute for Marxism–Leninism
Newspapers	Pravda	People's Daily	Neues Deutschland
Personnel	Party Organisational Work Department	Organisation Department	Party Organs Department
Discipline	Central Control Commission	Central Commission for Discipline Inspection	Central Party Control Commission
Schools	Higher Party School	Central Party School	"Karl Marx" Party Academy
Security	Main Political Directorate of the Soviet Army and Navy	Office of the National Security Commission	National Defence Council
Social	Women's Work Department	Society Work Department	Trade Unions and Social Policy Department

=== Leading organs ===
The leading organs of a central committee, commonly designated as central leading organs, were elected organs delegated with all or some of the central committee's powers when it was not in session. Every ruling communist party had a politburo and secretariat, albeit the name might differ from party to party. Other central committees also elected a control commission, responsible for party discipline work, a central military commission, responsible for military affairs, an orgburo, responsible for organisational questions, or other organs.

The politburo was the highest political organ of the central committee and directed party work between central committee sessions. While formally accountable to the central committee, and despite reporting on its work to it, the politburo often ends up controlling the central committee. The politburos is often a small organ composed of anywhere from 10 to 30 members. In some parties, as in the Romanian Communist Party and in the Chinese Communist Party (CCP), the politburo has a standing committee that leads politburo work. In China, it is known as the Politburo Standing Committee, and in Romania, it was known as the Political Executive Committee. The members of a politburo are the highest-standing officials of the given communist party and are, in practice, the country's leading political elite. Members usually have varied political backgrounds and experience from party, executive, legislative, and judicial work.

The secretariat is responsible for overseeing the execution of the decisions of the politburo and the central committee, communicating with the nationwide party organisation and being responsible for personnel appointments throughout the party. For example, the CPSU statute, adopted at the 22nd Congress in 1961, stated that the CPSU Secretariat was "to direct current work, chiefly the selection of personnel and the verification of the fulfilment of Party decisions." The most powerful individuals in the communist state system were politburo members who concurrently served as secretariat members, also referred to as secretaries of the central committee. The party leader, most often known as general secretary of the central committee, led the secretariat's work. As such, several scholars, like Darrell P. Hammer, Archie Brown and Wu Guoguang, have referred to the general secretary as the central committee's chief executive officer.

While all ruling central committees have had secretariats at some points, some opted to abolish them. For example, the League of Communists of Yugoslavia (LCY) opted to abolish its secretariat in 1966 to divide powers more equally. Later, in 1978, the 11th LCY Congress turned the Presidency, the Yugoslav counterpart to the politburo, into a "political-executive organ" in which no member could concurrently be a member and a secretary. Political work was headed by the president of the LCY Presidency, the party leader, and no member of the presidency could concurrently serve as a secretary, called executive secretary in the LCY. Executive work was led by the secretary of the LCY Presidency, and the officeholder was assisted by executive secretaries, who could not concurrently serve in the LCY Presidency but had to be members of the LCY Central Committee to be eligible to serve.

A control commission is also widespread in communist parties, but the electoral procedure varies. For instance, the Communist Party of Vietnam's control organ, the Central Inspection Commission, is elected by a session of the central committee. In contrast, the CCP counterpart, the Central Commission for Discipline Inspection, is elected by the party congress. Control commissions in all these parties, whether elected by the central committee or congress, bear more or less the same functions and responsibilities. They are responsible for investigating disciplinary issues, screening party members, handling appeals against party decisions, combatting political corruption and, in instances where control and auditing functions have been merged, auditing the party's economic and financial affairs.

In most cases, bar a few exceptions, these organs, no matter if they are elected by congress or a central committee session, work under the central committee's leadership. Yugoslavia's LCY Control Commission worked under the central committee's leadership until the 9th LCY Congress, held in 1969, which transformed it into the only statutory review organ of a ruling communist party, the Commission on Statutory Questions. The 9th Extraordinary Congress of the Polish United Workers' Party, held in 1981, amended the party statute to state explicitly that the Control Commission worked independently of Poland's PUWP Central Committee. In some parties, as in Czechoslovakia's CPCZ and Hungary's HSWP, the chairman and ordinary members of the party control commission are barred from holding office in the central committee. In other parties, as in China, the head of the control commission is also a member of its Central Committee, Politburo and Politburo Standing Committee.

== Membership ==
=== Elections and removals ===
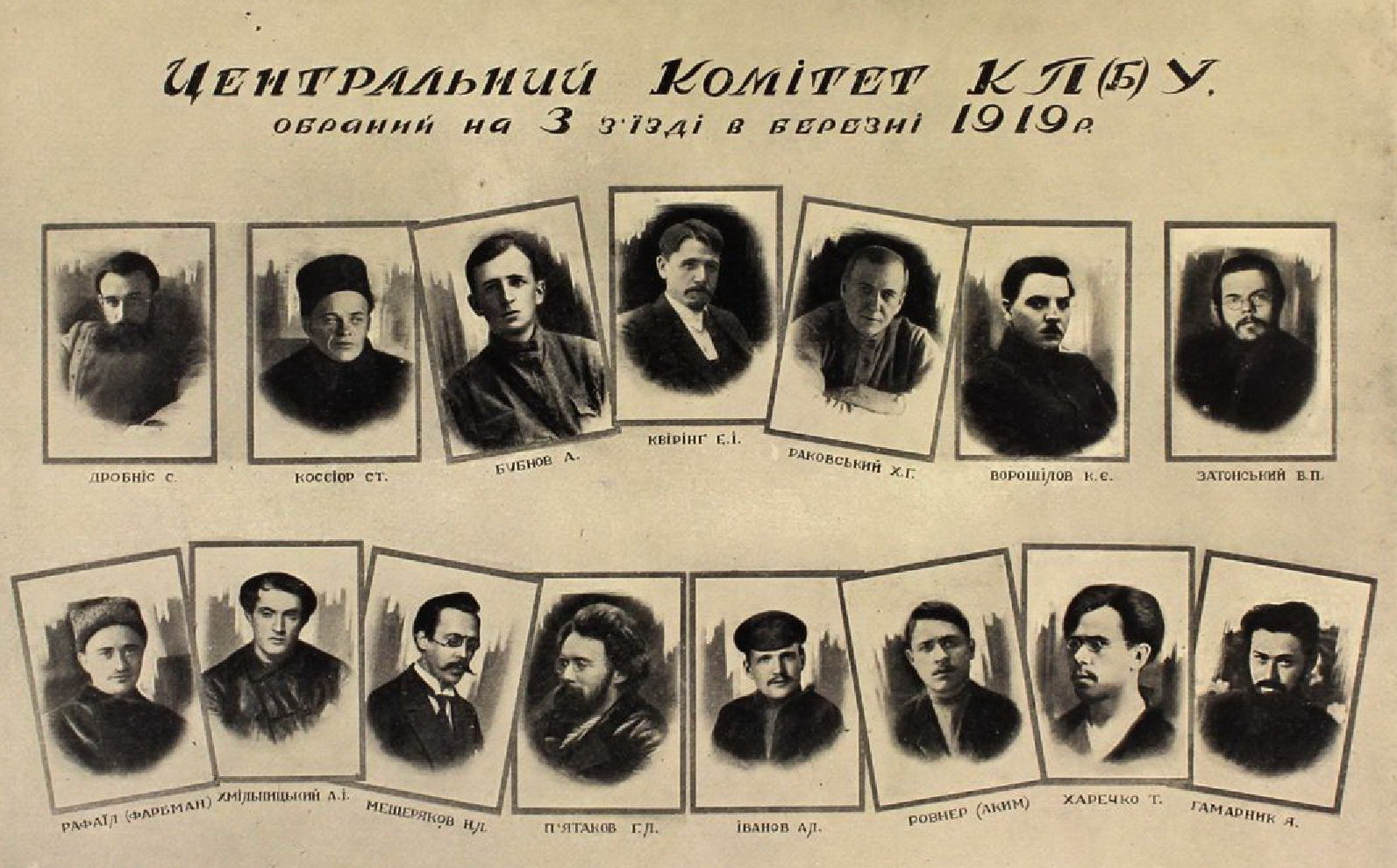
The following shows the composition of the Central Committee of the Communist Party (Bolsheviks) of Ukraine elected at its 3rd Congress, held on 1–6 March 1919.

The second to last session of a party congress usually elects the central committee. These sessions, especially in communist Eastern Europe, seldom lasted more than an hour. The congress closing session usually noted that the election of members and candidates to the central committee was carried out unanimously. However, this was not always the case: Nicolae Ceaușescu, the general secretary of the Central Committee of the Romanian Communist Party (RCP), told the 11th RCP Congress, held on 25–28 November 1974, that the central committee had been elected "quasi-unanimously".

Criteria for membership differs from party to party. For example, Enver Hoxha, the general secretary of the Central Committee of the Party of Labour of Albania (PLA), stated on 6 November 1981 at the 8th PLA Congress, that members were nominated based on their loyalty to the party and people, fidelity to Marxism–Leninism and their participating in socialist construction. Another criterion was age, with Hoxha noting that newer members were younger than incumbent ones. He also stated that party organizations had put forward over 2,000 potential candidates to the leadership but had shortened the list to 125 nominees for central committee membership.

Hoxha's statement was, according to Hazan, vague but more transparent on election practices than most of his communist counterparts. The exception to this rule was the League of Communists of Yugoslavia (LCY), which had instituted clear and transparent rules on elections to the LCY Central Committee. For example, the Sixth Session of the Central Committee of the 10th LCY Congress, held on 20 March 1978, instituted a system in which each republican branch had twenty representatives, each autonomous province had fifteen members, that the army branch had fifteen members in the central committee and that the president of the LCY Central Committee served as an ex officio central committee member. However, unlike the other ruling communist parties, the party congress did not elect the LCY Central Committee from 1974 onwards. The congresses and conferences of the LCY branches nominated individuals to serve in the LCY Central Committee, and the LCY congress decided on the eligibility of the candidates proposed.

The sitting party leadership usually controls congress proceedings, nominating candidates close to them and trying to remove opponents. Moreover, in some parties, as in the Bulgarian Communist Party (BCP), the central committee was empowered to elect additional members between congresses, which the Central Committee of the 11th BCP Congress did do on two occasions.

While most personnel changes did occur at congresses, removing or adding new central committee members between congresses occurred semi-regularly. The reasons for removing members varied. For instance, a session of Poland's PUWP Central Committee, held on 4 September 1980, removed Edward Gierek, the incumbent first secretary of the PUWP Central Committee, due to his "health issues". Others were removed due to specific reasons; for instance, Edward Babiuch and Zdzislaw Zandarowski were removed for "allowing distortions in interparty life, for shaping an incorrect style of party work, and for inadequate concern for the quality of party ranks", while Jan Szydlak was removed "for errors in economic policy and support for arbitrary action in this field."

In other cases, the central committee elected additional members on the death of sitting member. For example, a session of the CPCZ Central Committee, held on 1 December 1977, opted to elect Miloš Jakeš to the central committee to replace the recently deceased Jan Baryl. Not every party did as Czechoslovakia's CPCZ and Hungary's HSWP Central Committee rarely replaced members who died in office.

Other times, the removal of certain members was not explained. The Romanian Communist Party (RCP) Central Committee session, held on 26 November 1981, published a communique that stated Leonte Răutu had been removed but did not disclose why. The same RCP session removed Virgil Trofin and Vasilie Ogherlaci and noted in the session communique that they were "excluded from the Central Committee and punished by a vote of censure and warning." According to Hazan, its not certain that the decision to remove these figures was independently decided by central committee. The Political Committee of the Romanian Communist Party, the party's name for their politburo, had already decided to remove these members, and one can, therefore, construe the central committee's decision instead as a ratification of an already made decision.

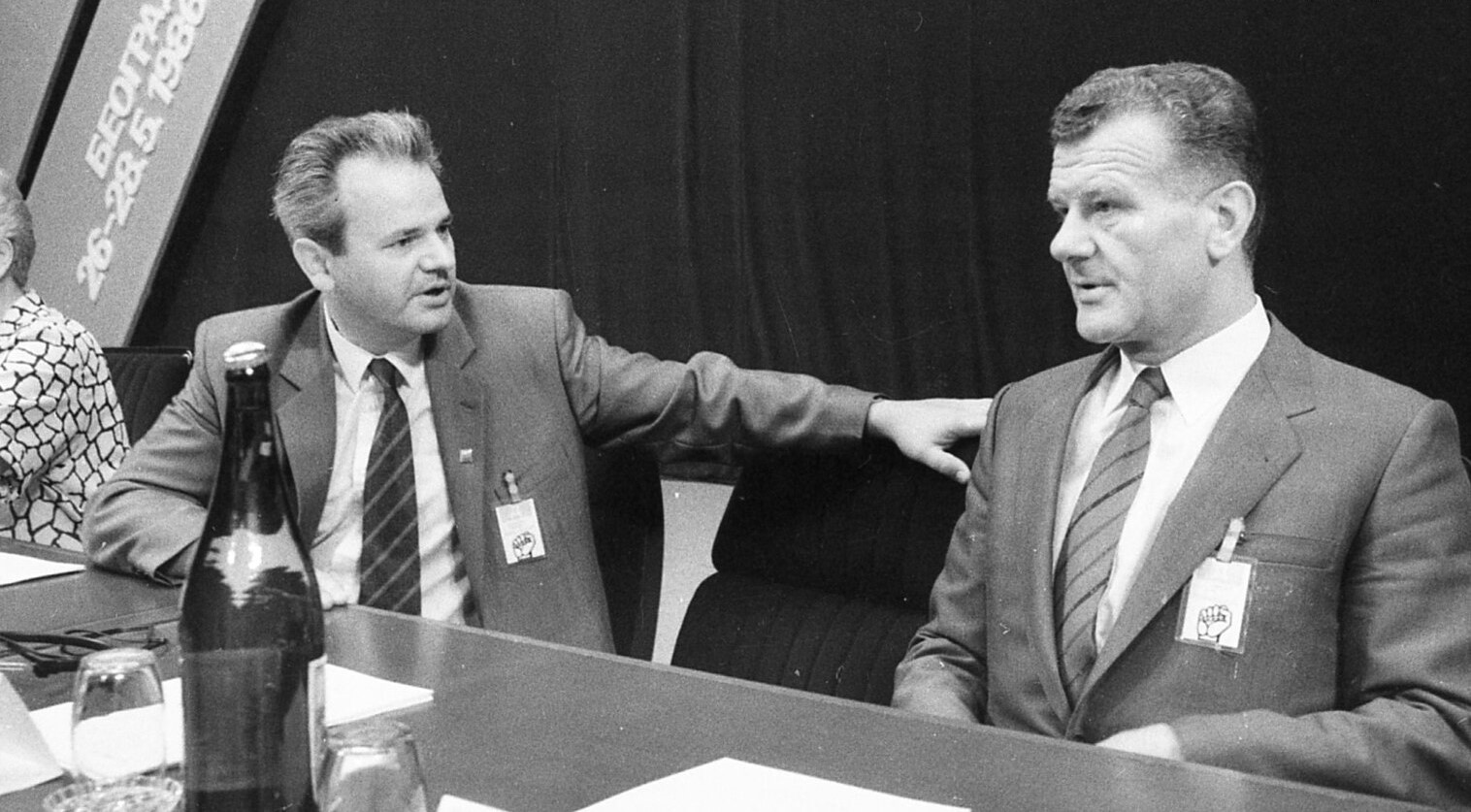
Slobodan Milošević (left) and Ivan Stambolić (right) of the League of Communists of Yugoslavia attending the session of the 10th Congress of the League of Communists of Serbia that elected a new Central Committee.

In some cases, the party leadership lost control or chose to democratise congress proceedings. For instance, the 9th Extraordinary Congress of the Polish United Workers' Party, held on 14–20 July 1981, was, according to Hazan, "the only time that the election of an East European Central Committee was subjected to democratic procedures", in the liberal democratic sense. The Electoral Commission of Poland's 9th PUWP Congress originally proposed 200 nominees for 200 seats in the PUWP Central Committee, but provincial delegations from the floor nominated a further 79 candidates. The congress delegates then elected the central committee by secret vote by crossing of 79 candidates. The result was that eleven out of fifteen incumbent members of the Politburo and the Secretariat were voted out of office.

Normally, up to two-thirds of central committee members are reelected at party congresses. Those who fail to get reelected are usually not victims of a purge. People often failed to get reelected since they lost or voluntarily left their political office. The central committees could be seen as representative organs of various political offices and institutions. Individuals who lose their political office, also lose their membership on the central committee.

In line with this reasoning, members lost reelection since the party leadership used the congress as an occasion to rearrange which institutions were to be represented in the central committee. In this way, the party leadership could guarantee that certain sectors were represented in the central committee. Despite this, many ruling central committees had elders in their ranks who had been members their whole careers. For example, in Hungary's HSWP by 1985, Antal Apró, Sándor Gáspár, Károly Kiss, István Szabó and Rezső Nyers had been central committee members since the party's seizure of power in 1948. Another interpretation, as outlined by Hazan, is that "the exercise of electing a new Central Committee is designed to remove those elements that had, for various reasons, become undesirable, while promoting people faithful to the party leader and his closest associates."

== See also ==
- Eastern Bloc politics
- Politburo
- Secretariat
- Central committees of parties
