= WSA =

WSA may refer to:

- van der Waals surface area
- War Shipping Administration, part of the US government responsible for building cargo ships in World War II
- Weapon storage area, a maximum security part of an ammunition depot where nuclear weapons are stored
- West Allerton railway station, Liverpool, England (station code)
- Western Sahara Authority
- Western Soccer Alliance
- Western Sydney Airport, an international airport currently under construction
- Wilderness study area
- Windows Socket API, Microsoft's implementation of Berkeley sockets
- Windows Subsystem for Android, a compatibility layer for Android apps in Windows 11
- Women's Squash Association, the governing body for the women's professional squash circuit and the women's world rankings
- Worker Student Alliance, a division of Students for a Democratic Society, sometimes referred to as SDS-WSA
- Workers' Solidarity Alliance
- World Service Authority
- World Soundtrack Awards
- World Summit Award
- WSA Process, Wet gas Sulphuric Acid is a Wet Catalysis Process
- Web Services Addressing
- Voivodeship Administrative Court, Wojewódzki Sąd Administracyjny, referred to as WSA
- United Nations World Summit Awards
