= Janusz Zawadzki =

Polish ice hockey player

- Born: 27 April 1931; Sosnowiec, Poland
- Died: 19 January 1977 (aged 45); Sosnowiec, Poland
- Position: Defence
- Played for: Legia Warsaw; Górnik Katowice
- National team: Poland
- Playing career: 1950–1958

Janusz Zawadzki (27 April 1931 – 19 January 1977) was a Polish ice hockey player. He played for Legia Warsaw and Górnik Katowice during his career. He won the Polish league championship twice, with Legia in 1953 and with Górnik in 1958. Zawadzki also played for the Polish national team at the 1956 Winter Olympics, and the 1957 and 1959 World Championship.
