= Central committees of parties =

A list of political party central committees:

== Communist ==
- Central Committee of the People's Democratic Party of Afghanistan
- Central Committee of the Party of Labor of Albania
- Central Committee of the Azerbaijani Democratic Party
- Central Committee of the People's Revolutionary Party of Benin
- Central Committee of the Bulgarian Communist Party
- Central Committee of the Communist Party of Canada
- Central Committee of the Chinese Communist Party
- Central Committee of the Communist Party of Cuba
- Central Committee of the Communist Party of Czechoslovakia
- Central Committee of the Workers' Party of Ethiopia
- Central Committee of the Socialist Unity Party of Germany
- Central Committee of the Communist Party of Greece
- Central Committee of the Hungarian Socialist Workers' Party
- Central Committee of the Communist Party of India
- Central Committee of the Communist Party of India (Maoist)
- Central Committee of the Communist Party of India (Marxist)
- Central Committee of the Italian Communist Party
- Central Committee of the Japanese Communist Party
- Central Committee of the Communist Party of Kampuchea
- Central Committee of the Lao People's Revolutionary Party
- Central Committee of the Communist Party of Nepal (Maoist Centre)
- Central Committee of the Communist Party of Nepal (Unified Marxist–Leninist)
- Central Committee of the Communist Party of Nepal (Unified Socialist)
- Central Committee of the Democratic Front for the Liberation of Palestine
- Central Committee of the Popular Front for the Liberation of Palestine
- Central Committee of the Communist Party of the Philippines
- Central Committee of the Polish United Workers' Party
- Central Committee of the Portuguese Communist Party
- Central Committee of the Communist Party of the Russian Federation
- Central Committee of the Romanian Communist Party
- Central Committee of the Sammarinese Communist Party
- Central Committee of the South African Communist Party
- Central Committee of the Communist Party of the Soviet Union
  - Central Committee of the Communist Party of Armenia
  - Central Committee of the Azerbaijan Communist Party
  - Central Committee of the Communist Party of Byelorussia
  - Central Committee of the Communist Party of Estonia
  - Central Committee of the Communist Party of Georgia
  - Central Committee of the Communist Party of Kazakhstan
  - Central Committee of the Communist Party of Kirghizia
  - Central Committee of the Communist Party of Latvia
  - Central Committee of the Communist Party of Lithuania
  - Central Committee of the Communist Party of Moldavia
  - Central Committee of the Communist Party of Tajikistan
  - Central Committee of the Communist Party of Turkmenistan
  - Central Committee of the Communist Party of Ukraine
  - Central Committee of the Communist Party of Uzbekistan
- Central Committee of the Tuvan People's Revolutionary Party
- Central Committee of the Workers' Party of Korea
- Central Committee of the Communist Party of Vietnam
- Central Committee of the United Wa State Party
- Central Committee of the League of Communists of Yugoslavia
  - Central Committee of the League of Communists of Bosnia and Herzegovina
  - Central Committee of the League of Communists of Croatia
  - Central Committee of the League of Communists of Macedonia
  - Central Committee of the League of Communists of Montenegro
  - Central Committee of the League of Communists of Serbia
    - Central Committee of the League of Communists of Vojvodina
    - Central Committee of the League of Communists of Kosovo
  - Central Committee of the League of Communists of Slovenia

== Non-communist ==
- Central Committee of the Arab Socialist Ba'ath party - Syria Region (neo-Baathism and pan-Arabism)
- Central Committee of the Burma Socialist Programme Party (Burmese Way to Socialism)
- Central Committee of the Chama Cha Mapinduzi (African socialism and African nationalism)
- Central Committee of the Convention People's Party (Pan-Africanism, African socialism and Nkrumaism)
- Central Committee of Fatah (social democracy and democratic socialism)
- Central Executive Committee of Democratic Progressive Party (Taiwan independence movement, Taiwanese nationalism and center-left liberalism)
- Central Committee of the Kuomintang (Three Principles of the People, conservatism and Chinese nationalism)
- Central Committee of the Left (democratic socialism)
- Central Committee of Likud (national liberalism and liberal conservatism)
- Central Committee of the National Revolutionary Movement for Development (Hutu Power, social conservatism and anti-communism)
- Central Committee of the Popular Movement of the Revolution (Zairian nationalism, anti-communism and authenticité)
- Central Committee of the Pakistan Peoples Party (social democracy and democratic socialism)
- Central Committee of the People's Front for Democracy and Justice (secularism and Eritrean nationalism)
- Central Committee of the People's Progressive Party/Civic (social democracy, democratic socialism and left-wing nationalism)
- Central Committee of United National Independence Party (African socialism and African nationalism)

== Formerly communist ==
- Central Committee of the Cambodian People's Party (conservatism and economic liberalism since 1991)
- Central Committee of the Congolese Party of Labour (social democracy and democratic socialism since 2006)
- Central Committee of FRELIMO (social democracy and democratic socialism since 1989)
- Central Committee of the Mongolian People's Party (social democracy and democratic socialism since 1990)
- Central Committee of the MPLA (social democracy and democratic socialism since 1990)
- Central Committee of PAICV (social democracy and democratic socialism since 1990)
- Central Committee of PAIGC (social democracy and democratic socialism since 1991)
- Central Committee of SWAPO (social democracy and democratic socialism since 1990, Socialism with Namibian characteristics since 2017)
- Central Committee of the Yemeni Socialist Party (social democracy and Arab nationalism since 1990)
