= Zavadsky =

Zavadsky, (also rendered Zavadskiy, Zavadski, or Zavadskyi), is a Slavic surname. Notable people with the surname include:

- Aleksandr Zavadskiy (born 1966), Russian footballer
- Dmytro Zavadskyi (born 1988), Ukrainian badminton player
- Dzmitry Zavadski (1972–c. 2000), Belarusian journalist
- Lidia Zavadsky (1937–2001), Israeli visual artist
- Vladimir Zavadsky (1978–2023), Russian soldier
- Yuri Zavadsky (1894–1977), Soviet and Russian theater director, actor and pedagogue

== See also ==
- Zawadzki
