= Sebastian Zawadzki =

Polish composer and pianist

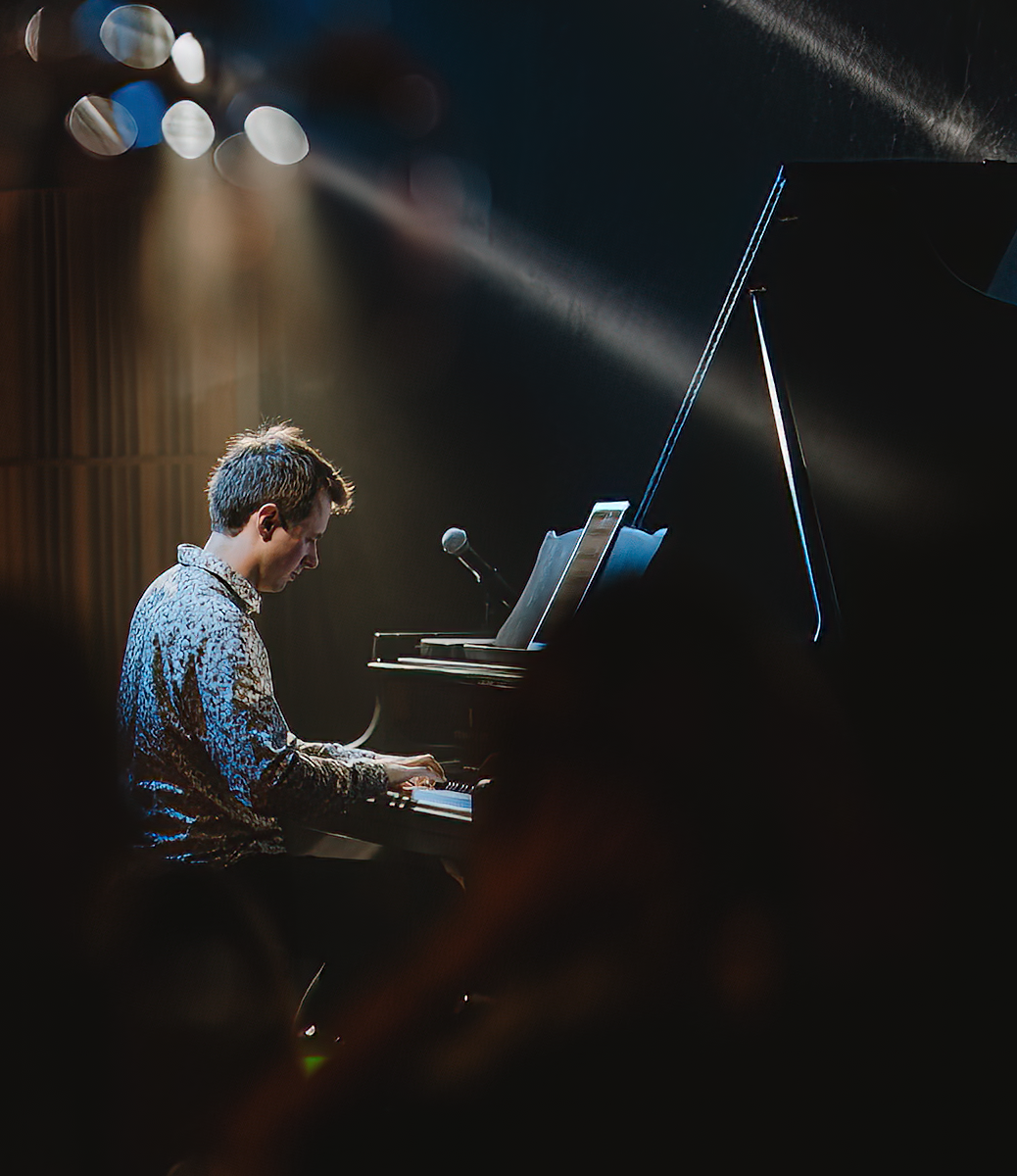
- Sebastian Zawadzki in Copenhagen

Background information
- Born: 14 October 1991 (age 34); Toruń, Poland
- Origin: Polish
- Genres: jazz, experimental, classical, ambient, minimalism
- Occupations: composer, pianist
- Instrument: piano
- Years active: 2012–present
- Labels: Sebastian Zawadzki Music, A New Story, ACT Music
- Awards: 2026 – Fryderyk Award nomination (Jazz Album of the Year, "Portraits")
- Website: www.sebastian-zawadzki.com

Sebastian Zawadzki (born 14 October 1991) is a Polish-born jazz pianist, composer and film composer based in Copenhagen, Denmark. He has released albums since 2014 and composes and arranges music for film, television and concert projects. His work incorporates elements of classical and jazz music.

He has performed and collaborated with artists such as Adam Bałdych, Bonaventura di Bello, Wallace Roney Jr. and Felix Pastorius, and has appeared on stage with the John Scofield Trio. He has released music for labels including ACT Music and Upright Music, as well as on his own label.

Zawadzki has performed or will perform at venues including the Berlin Philharmonie, concert halls in Kazakhstan, Cavatina Hall in Bielsko-Biała, Jazzhus Montmartre, Epicurus in Copenhagen and many more. He collaborates with Danish pianist Niels Lan Doky and performs regularly at Epicurus in Copenhagen as part of curated live jazz projects. In addition to his work as a performer, he composes music for film and television.

== Early life and career ==
Sebastian Zawadzki was born in Poland and has lived in Denmark since 2010. At the age of 19, he was admitted to Syddansk Musikkonservatorium in Odense, where he studied piano. He also studied at conservatories in Kraków, Poland, and at Rytmisk Musikkonservatorium in Copenhagen. He took part in the ASCAP Film Scoring Workshop in Los Angeles led by Richard Bellis before returning to Syddansk Musikkonservatorium as a soloist.

His orchestration skills were further developed under the guidance of Academy Award-winning composer Jan A. P. Kaczmarek, for whom he contributed orchestrations for concert and film projects, including Symfonia bez Końca. Zawadzki also worked as an orchestrator for Copenhagen Phil and contributed arrangements for the 60 Minutes festival. Furthermore, he collaborated with Polish film composer Bartosz Chajdecki, recording piano for films including Chce się żyć and Bogowie.

Zawadzki is active in Copenhagen's jazz scene and has toured and recorded in numerous countries. He has released several albums under his own name and as a sideman. He has performed with musicians such as Simon Thorsen, Larry Grenadier, Jordan Jackson, Marcin Wasilewski, Grzech Piotrowski, Maciej Kitajewski, Klanglys and Ole Kock Hansen. He has also established his own recording studio in Copenhagen.

Apart from his work as a pianist, Zawadzki is also active as a film composer. One of his notable projects was the score for the film Cent'anni, directed by Maja Prelog. The film, a Slovenian-Italian-Polish co-production supported by the Polish Film Institute, received the Docs-in-Progress Award at the Cannes Film Market.

== Solo works ==
Zawadzki began his career as a jazz pianist at a young age. His first album, Luminescence (2014), was released by Polish record label For-tune Records and features minimalistic improvised solo piano compositions recorded in RecPublica Studios in Poland. His second album, Euphony (2015), was written for an expanded ensemble consisting of string quartet and jazz piano trio.

Influenced by improvised music and classical music from a young age, Zawadzki also wrote classical pieces during his studies. One of them, Concerto for Bassoon and Chamber Orchestra (2016), had its premiere at the IX Festiwal Nowego Miasta in Warsaw in 2016.

After completing studies and courses in Denmark, Poland and the United States, Zawadzki settled in Denmark, where he continued recording his own music. His album Between the Dusk of a Summer Night (2018) featured the Budapest Symphony Orchestra and soloists, marking a turn toward contemporary classical music and minimalism. Shortly afterwards, he recorded Piano Works Vol.1 (2018) in Copenhagen, exploring improvisation, preparation and the sonic possibilities of the grand piano. He then released Norn (2018), a soundscape for string quartet, synthesizers and piano.

Piano Works Vol.2 was released in 2019 and recorded on an upright piano located at the Royal Academy in Copenhagen as well as on grand piano. It became one of the more widely streamed releases in Zawadzki's catalogue. He continued to develop this direction in subsequent works such as Songs about Time, which combines voice, piano and string quartet, as well as in releases such as Entropy, Spirituality and Far Away.

His later releases Altair (2022), continued this trajectory. Altair was written for symphony orchestra, mallets and piano.

In addition to recording albums, Zawadzki has remained an active touring artist and has performed in countries including Poland, Denmark, Sweden, the United States, Kazakhstan, Germany and Italy. His live performances have included orchestral and chamber settings as well as jazz trio formats.

Sebastian also releases original music through the Copenhagen-based sync label Upright Music, focusing on film and production music. The first album released by Upright Music is Still Waters (2026). In 2025, he presented his new Nordic Trio project at venues including Huset and Jazzhus Montmartre in Copenhagen.

== Collaborations ==
Zawadzki also works as a film composer, arranger and conductor. His work can be found in several film productions.

He collaborated with Copenhagen Phil (Danish Symphony Orchestra), for whom he was commissioned to rearrange music by other bands for full symphonic orchestra, including music by When Saints Go Machine, Den Sorte Skole and Lowly. He also collaborated with Academy Award-winning composer Jan A.P. Kaczmarek, orchestrating his film and concert music.

In January 2025, Adam Bałdych Quintet released the album Portraits, featuring Zawadzki on piano, through ACT Music. The album was nominated for a Fryderyk Award, Poland’s most prestigious music awards, in 2026 in the category Jazz Album of the Year. He subsequently performed with the group in Poland and Germany.

== Discography ==
=== Solo albums ===
- Sebastian Zawadzki Nordic Trio – Live at Xenon, Copenhagen (2025, Sebastian Zawadzki Music)
- Monochrome (2025, Sebastian Zawadzki Music)
- Pax Elysium (2023, Sebastian Zawadzki Music)
- Vibrations (2023, Sebastian Zawadzki Music)
- Altair (2022, Sebastian Zawadzki Music)
- Spirituality (2021, Sebastian Zawadzki Music)
- Songs about Time (2020, Sebastian Zawadzki Music)
- Piano Works Vol.2 (2019, Sebastian Zawadzki Music)
- Norn (2018, Sebastian Zawadzki Music)
- Piano Works Vol.1 (2018, Sebastian Zawadzki Music)
- Between the Dusk of a Summer Night (2018, Sebastian Zawadzki Music)
- Euphony (2015, For-tune Records)
- Luminescence (2014, For-tune Records)

=== Film scores ===
- Cent'anni by Maja Prelog (PL, 2023)
- Aurora Vega by Sicilla Luna (DK, 2018)
- Mr. Genovese by Daniela Arguello (US, 2018)
- How You See Me by Kathryn Harriman (US, 2017)
- Living the Mountain by Sinjun Balabanoff (US, 2017)
- Knyttet til Helvede. Paradis by Sicilla Luna (DK, 2017)
- 1984 by Mads Mengel (DK, 2016)
- Nu Vandrer Livet by Sicilla Luna (DK, 2016)
- United, We Save by Iben Ravn (DK, 2015)

=== Collaborations ===
- Serenity (2025, Almadera)
- Portraits (2025, Adam Bałdych Quintet, ACT Music)
- Faith (2016, Paweł Wszołek Quintet, For-tune Records)
- Choice (2014, Paweł Wszołek Quartet, Fresh Sounds Records)
- Tåge (2013, Zawadzki/Praśniewski/Wośko Trio, Multikulti Records)
- Tone Raw (2012, Tone Raw, Song of Songs Records)
