= Saturnin Zawadzki =

Polish soil scientist

Saturnin Zawadzki (7 July 1923 in Radom, Poland – 17 September 2003) was a Polish soil scientist. Professor of The Institute for Land Reclamation and Grassland Farming (Polish: Instytut Melioracji i Użytków Zielonych) and member of the Institute of Agrophysics, Polish Academy of Sciences (PAN).

Author of works about origins, evolution and transforms of hydrogenic soils. Author of books Zarys charakterystyki gleb Polski, Gleboznawstwo.
