= Cavatina Hall =

Concert hall and office building in Bielsko-Biała, Poland

Coordinates: 49.8175°N 19.0494°E

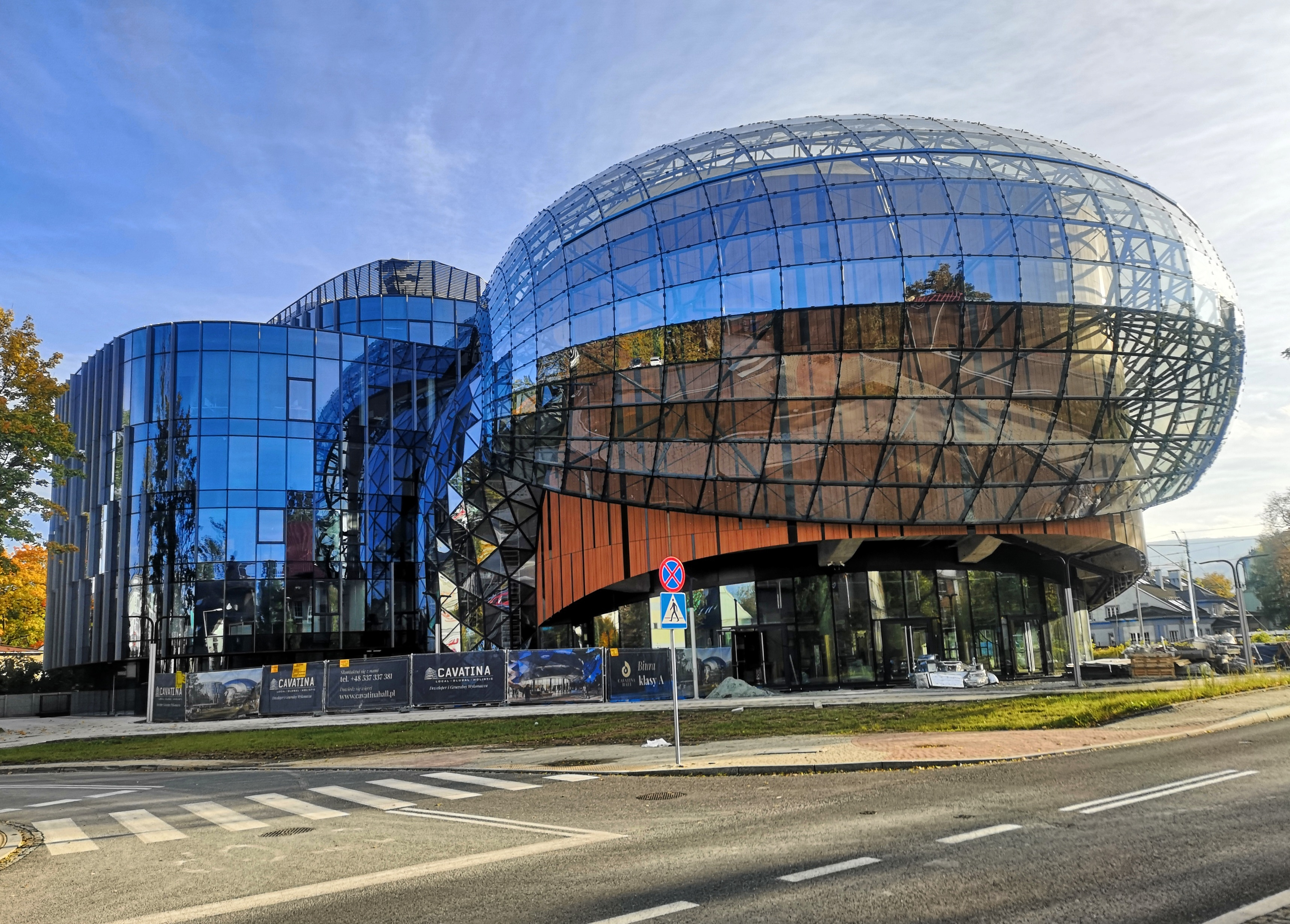
view of the concert hall from the North

Cavatina Hall is a building complex consisting of an office building and a concert hall in Bielsko-Biała in Poland.

== History ==
The building opened in 2022. It bears the name of the developer and operator, the real estate company Cavatina, which in turn is named after the Italian song type Cavatina. The office building has a glass facade with rounded corners, the wooden concert hall is covered by a curved glass superstructure, making it an example of blobitecture.

view of the stage in the concert hall

== Concert hall ==
The concert hall seats 1,000 people and is the first privately operated concert hall in Poland. There is also a chamber music hall and a recording studio.

In 2024, the operator founded a resident symphony orchestra. Its inaugural conductor is Stanley Dodds, a former violinist of the Berlin Philharmonic.

== Office building ==
There are 9,000 square metres of office space on six floors, as well as a parking garage and a restaurant.
