= Józef Zawadzki =

Józef Zawadzki may refer to:

- Aleksander Zawadzki (naturalist), real name Józef Zawadzki, (1798–1868), naturalist
- Józef Zawadzki (chemist) (1886–1951), physical chemist and technologist
- Józef Zawadzki (publisher) (1781–1838), pressman, publisher, typographer and bibliopolist
