= Aleksander Zawadzki (activist) =

Polish activist

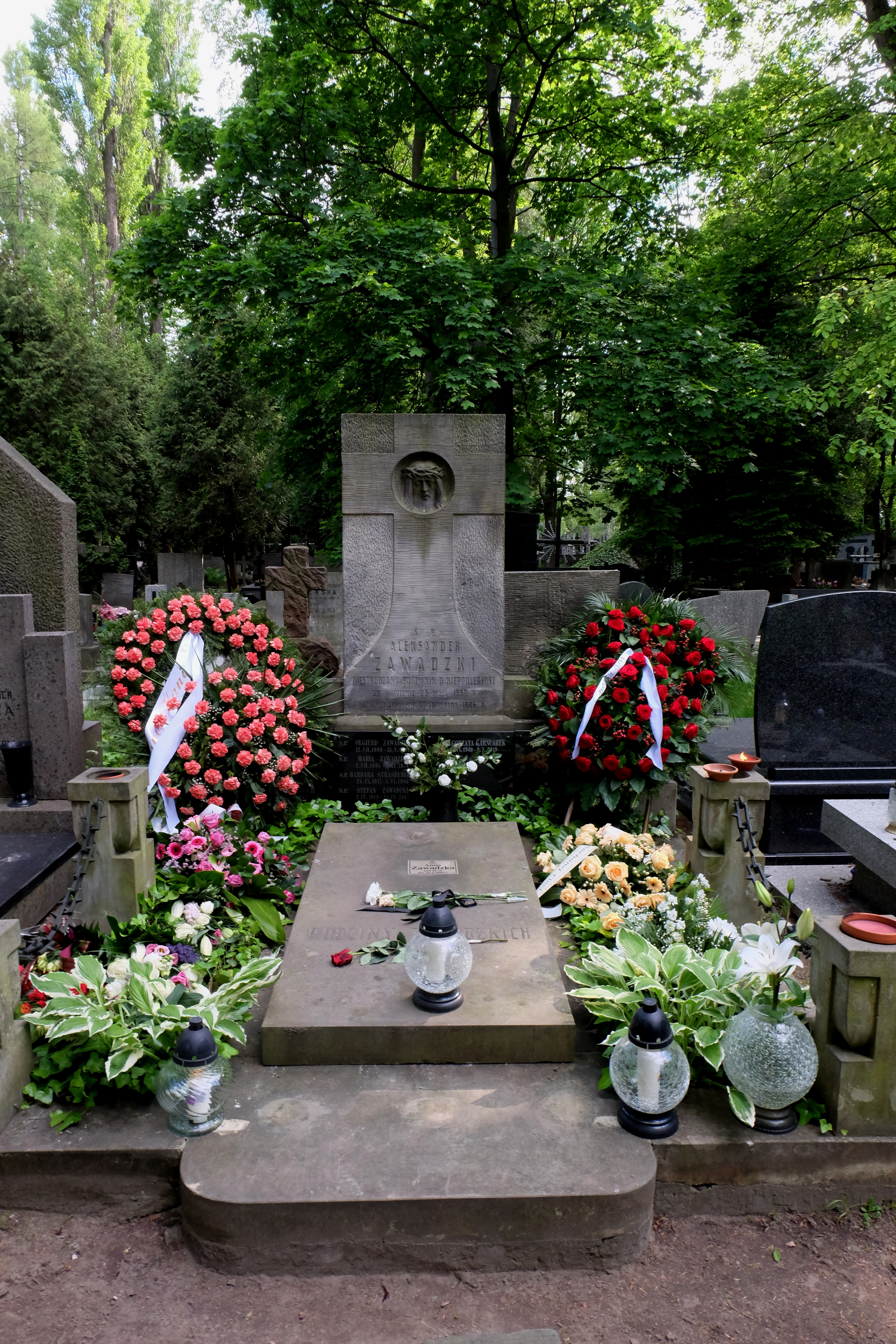
Grave of Aleksander Zawadzki at Powązki Military Cemetery in Warsaw

Aleksander Zawadzki, pseudonym Ojciec Prokop, (1859 – 23 November 1926) was a Polish political and educational activist, publicist.

Zawadzki was a member of the Liga Polska, Liga Narodowa (1893–1908), a Main Board of the Stronnictwo Narodowo-Demokratyczne (National-Democratic Party; 1905–1907), Macierz Szkolna Królestwa Polskiego (1905–1908), Zjednoczenie Ludowe (1917–1918), founder of the Związek Nauczycieli Szkół Ludowych (1905), founder and President of the Narodowy Związek Chłopski National Peasants' Union (1912).

== Biography ==
Zawadzki was born in 1859 in Wilno. While he was studying in Saint Petersburg, he was associated with the narodnicy movement. Then, Zawadzki became an activist in social groups, and because of that was arrested and exiled to Siberia (1878–1881, 1885–1892).

Together with group of activists, he founded Fronda Zawadzkiego (Fronde of Zawadzki), transformed in 1912 into the Narodowy Związek Chłopski.

He died on 23 November 1926.
