= Zawadzki coat of arms =

Polish coat of arms

Zawadzki
- Battle cry: This is for the knights, motto=Meum defendo alienum non peto
- Earliest mention: 1358 as Ostoja, 1526 as variation: Zawadzki
- Families: Büthner vel Buethner, Bytner, Büthner-Zawadzki, Buethner-Zawadzki, Bytner-Zawadzki, Sawatzki, Zawacki, Zawadzki

Zawadzki is a Polish coat of arms. It was used by several szlachta families in the times of the Polish–Lithuanian Commonwealth.

== See also ==
- Polish heraldry
- Heraldry
- Coat of arms
- List of Polish nobility coats of arms
