= 1952–53 Polska Liga Hokejowa season =

Polish ice hockey season

The 1952–53 Polska Liga Hokejowa season was the 18th season of the Polska Liga Hokejowa, the top level of ice hockey in Poland. 12 teams participated in the league, and Legia Warszawa won the championship.

== First round ==
=== Group I ===
	Club
1.	Legia Warszawa
2.	Kolejarz Torun
3.	LZS

=== Group II ===
	Club
1.	Górnik Janów
2.	Budowlani Opole
3.	Stal

=== Group III ===
	Club
1.	KTH Krynica
2.	Ogniwo Kraków
3.	Spójnia Nowy Targ

=== Group IV ===
	Club
1.	Gwardia Katowice
2.	ŁKS Łódź
3.	AZS Katowice

== Final round ==
	Club	GP	Goals	Pts
1.	Legia Warszawa	3	21:8	6
2.	KTH Krynica	3	21:14	3
3.	Górnik Janów	3	11:10	3
4.	Gwardia Katowice	3	7:28	0
