= Voivodeship Administrative Court =

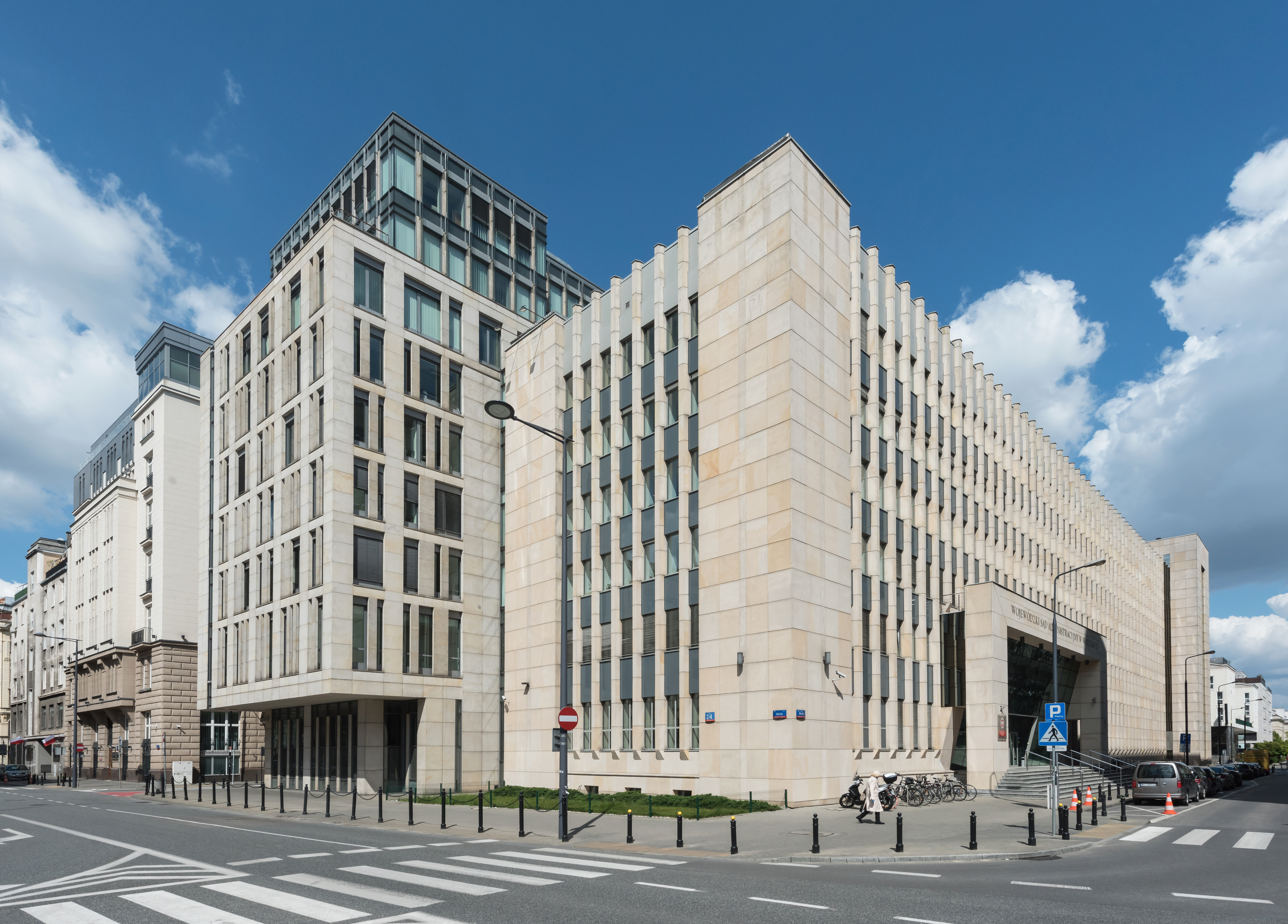
The headquarters of Warsaw Voivodeship Administrative Court and the Supreme Administrative Court of Poland.

Voivodeship Administrative Court (Polish: Wojewódzki Sąd Administracyjny, WSA) is a first instance administrative court in Poland. The headquarters of the court departments are located in the cities of Białystok, Bydgoszcz, Gdańsk, Gliwice, Gorzów Wielkopolski, Kielce, Kraków, Lublin, Łódź, Olsztyn, Opole, Poznań, Rzeszów, Szczecin, Warsaw (including a branch division located in Radom), and Wrocław.
