= Sylwester Zawadzki (lawyer) =

Polish jurist, politician and judge (1921–1999)

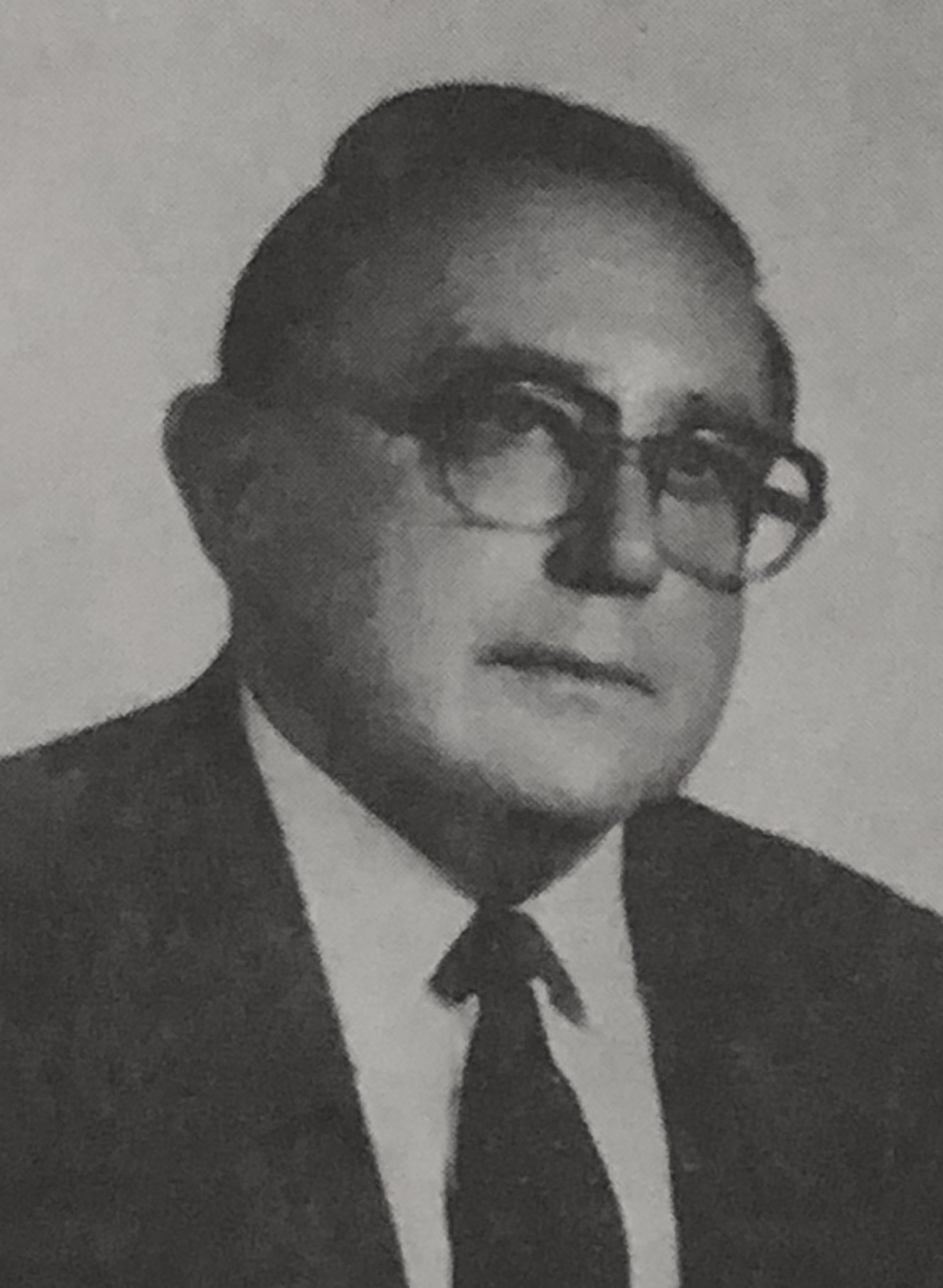
- Sylwester Zawadzki, 1986
- Born: 19 October 1921; Warsaw
- Died: 4 July 1999 (aged 77); Warsaw
- Occupations: Jurist, politician, judge

Sylwester Zawadzki (19 October 1921 – 4 July 1999) was a jurist, politician and judge.

== Biography ==
The son of Jan and Janina. In 1939 he passed matura at the Józef Poniatowski High School in Warsaw. During the Nazi occupation of Poland he was a construction worker; he was twice taken to the Third Reich for forced labor.

In 1946 he joined Polish Socialist Party; he was a member of its Central Audit Commission from December 1947 to December 1948. He served as Secretary of the Management Board of the Warsaw Housing Cooperative from 1946 to 1948. In 1948 he joined Polish United Workers' Party. In 1950 he graduated from the law faculty at the University of Warsaw. From April 1950 to April 1951 he was a Chairman of the Supreme Council of the Polish Students' Association. He undertook doctoral studies at the Institute for the Training of Scientific Staff at the Central Committee of the Polish United Workers' Party.

He worked at the Institute of Legal Studies of the Polish Academy of Sciences. He supervised more than a dozen doctoral dissertations. He was editor-in-chief of the Państwo i prawo journal. From 1963 to 1968, he served as Deputy Scientific Secretary of Division I (Social Sciences) of the Polish Academy of Sciences. From 1968 he worked at the University of Warsaw. From 1969 to 1975, he was the director of the Institute of State and Law Sciences at the University of Warsaw. In 1976 he was elected a member of the Polish Academy of Sciences.

His research interests included the state and democracy, issues of the constitution and parliamentarism, institutional guarantees of the rule of law, control of the administration. He contributed to Problemy Rad Narodowych.

From 1961 to 1969 he was a member of the Warsaw National Council. He was president of Supreme Administrative Court of Poland from 1980 to 1981, minister of justice from June 1981 to November 1983 and member of Council of State of the Polish People's Republic from November 1985 to July 1989. He was a member of Sejm from 1972 to 1989. In February–March 1989 he took part in the Round Table proceedings; on the government side.

== Works ==
Monographs:

- Rozwój więzi rad narodowych z masami pracującymi w Polsce Ludowej. 1955.
- Państwo dobrobytu. Doktryna i praktyka. 1964.
- Marksistowska teoria państwa. 1964.
- Państwo dobrobytu – doktryna i praktyka. 1970.
- Wstęp do nauki prawa konstytucyjnego. 1974. Co-authored with Zdzisław Jarosz.
- Z teorii i praktyki demokracji socjalistycznej. 1980.
- Teoria państwa i prawa. 1980. Co-authored with Wiesław Lang and Jerzy Wróblewski.
- Prawo konstytucyjne. 1981. Co-authored with Zdzisław Jarosz.

Editions:

- Spór o istotę państwa. 1961.
- Udział ławników w postępowaniu karnym. Opinie a rzeczywistość. 1970.
- Samorząd mieszkańców. Wybrane zagadnienia teorii i praktyki. 1972.
- Gromadzkie Rady Narodowe w świetle badań empirycznych przed reformą. 1973.
- Tendencje rozwoju władzy lokalnej we współczesnym świecie. 1976.

== Awards ==
- Medal of the 10th Anniversary of People's Poland (24 January 1955)
- Honorary degree of the University of Wrocław
- Honorary degree of the Kyoto University

== Bibliography ==
- Zawadzki, Sylwester (2008). Retrospekcja mojego życia. Warszawa.
