= Supreme Administrative Court of Poland =

- Polish: Naczelny Sąd Administracyjny
- Established: 1980; 46 years ago
- Jurisdiction: Poland
- Location: Warsaw
- Authorised by: Constitution of Poland
- Website: nsa.gov.pl

President of the Court
- Currently: Jacek Chlebny
- Since: February 18, 2022; 4 years ago

The Supreme Administrative Court of the Republic of Poland (Polish: Naczelny Sąd Administracyjny [naˈt͡ʂɛl.nɘ ˈsɔnt ad.mi.ɲis.traˈt͡sɘj.nɘ], NSA [ɛn.ɛsˈa]) is the court of last resort in administrative cases e.g. those betweens private citizens (or corporations) and administrative bodies. This court deals with appeals from lower administrative courts called Voivodeship Administrative Courts.

== Structure of the Supreme Administrative Court of Poland ==
The Supreme Administrative Court is located in Warsaw. It consists of The President of the Supreme Administrative Court, Vice Presidents, and judges.

=== Chambers ===
The Supreme Administrative Court is divided into three chambers: Commercial Chamber, Financial Chamber, and General Administrative Chamber.

The Commercial Chamber supervises the jurisdiction of regional administrative courts as far as customs, and most business regulation is concerned. The Financial Chamber supervises the jurisdiction of regional administrative courts when it comes to financial obligations and other payments regulated by tax law. The General Administrative Chamber supervises the rest of the jurisdiction of regional administrative courts.

Within its organization, there are three organs: The President of The Supreme Administrative Court, The General Assembly of Judges, and The Council of Judges.

=== President and Vice President ===
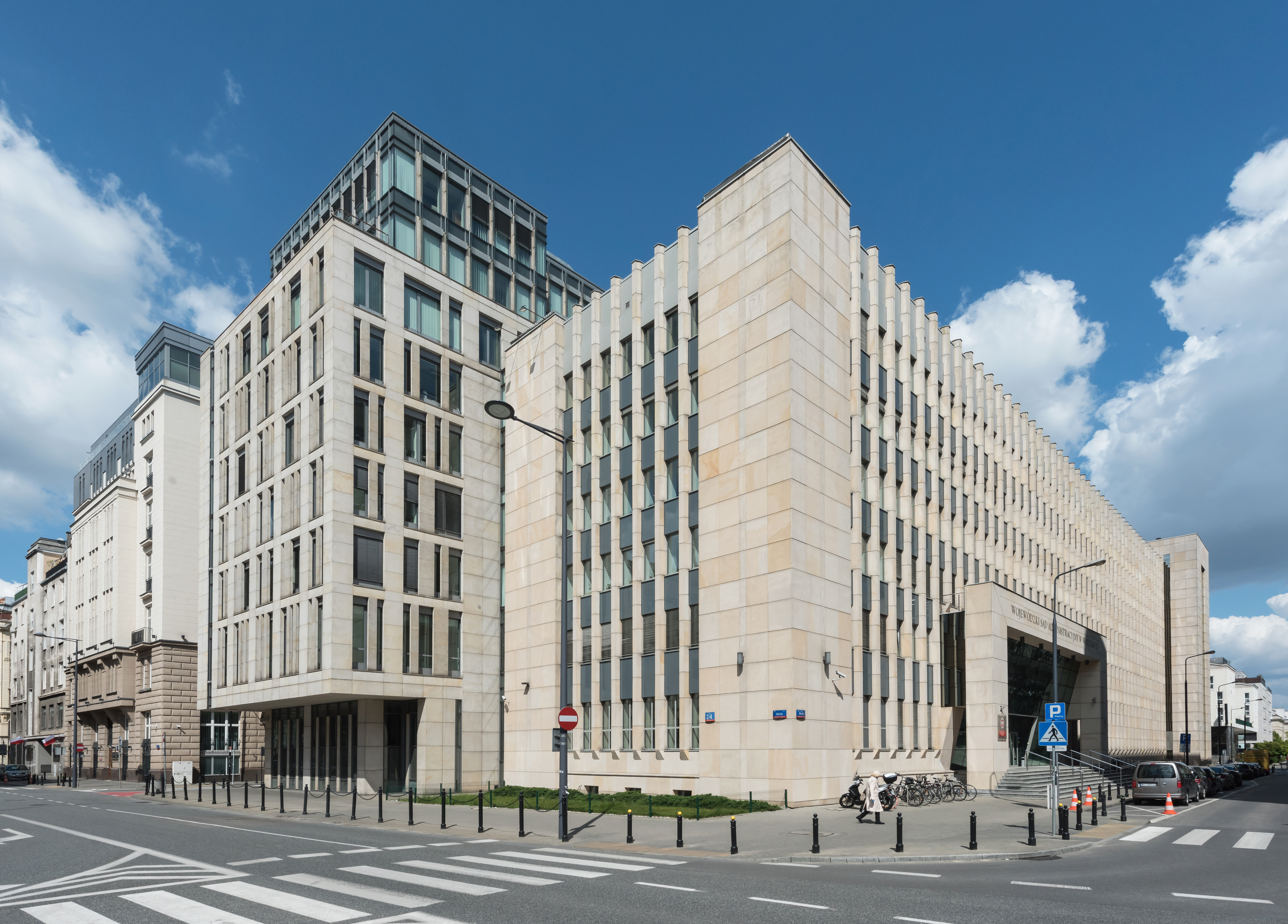
Supreme Administrative Court of Poland in Warsaw

The President of the Supreme Administrative Court manages the functioning of The Supreme Administrative Court and represents it on the outside. He has the right to look into all cases pleaded in The Supreme Administrative Court. He may require not only explanations but also removing faults in a procedure and may also be present during a closed session. The President of Supreme Administrative Court is nominated for 6 years by the Polish President as one of two candidates designated by The General Assembly of Judges. These two candidates are chosen from all the judges of the Supreme Administrative Court.

The Vice-presidents of the Supreme Administrative Court take up their activities commissioned by The President. Being designated by The President, they direct the work within each Chamber. They are nominated and dismissed by the President of Poland.

=== Judges ===
The General Assembly of Judges consists of judges nominated to the Supreme Administrative Court. At the top of the hierarchy, there is The President of the Supreme Administrative Court. To their duties belong:

- considering the annual report concerning the activity of The Supreme Administrative Court prepared by The President,
- presenting candidates for judges to the Polish Judiciary Council,
- designating two candidates for The President of The Supreme Administrative Court,
- approving candidates for Vice-presidents, which is needed for their nomination by the President of Poland,
- recognizing and giving an opinion to every case presented by The President or by each judge.

An absolute majority in the presence of at least half of the members is needed in order to pass the resolution.

The Council of Judges sets a division of activities within the Supreme Administrative Court and distributes the coming cases to the judges. It gives an opinion concerning candidates for judges to The General Assembly. The term of this organ lasts three years. The chairman of The Council is The President of the Supreme Administrative Court. Again, an absolute majority in the presence of at least half of the members is needed here to pass a resolution.

== Presidents of the Court ==
- 1980–1981 – Sylwester Zawadzki (lawyer)
- 1982–1992 – Adam Zieliński
- 1992–2004 – Roman Hauser
- 2004–2010 – Janusz Trzciński
- 2010–2015 – Roman Hauser
- 2015–2022 – Marek Zirk-Sadowski
- Since 2022 – Jacek Chlebny

== See also ==
- Administrative court
