= Yga Kostrzewa =

Polish economist, LGBTQ+ rights activist and writer

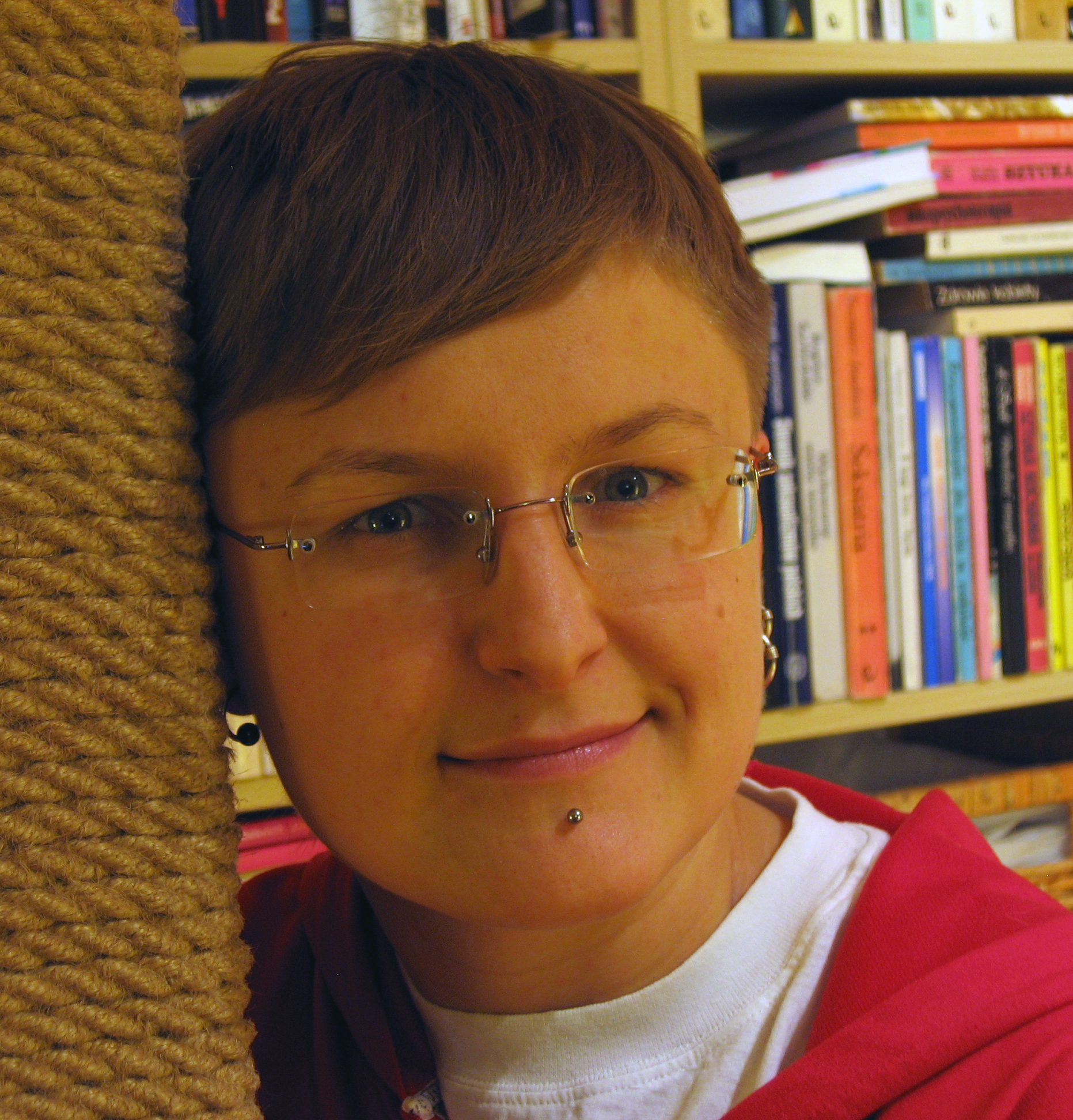
- Born: Inga Krystyna Kostrzewa; September 12, 1973 (age 52)
- Education: T. Baird State Music School
- Alma mater: University of Warsaw
- Occupation(s): economist, LGBTQ+ rights activist and writer
- Employer: Inaczej
- Organization(s): Lambda Warsaw; Trans-Fuzja; Congress of Women Council

Yga Kostrzewa (born 12 September 1973) is a Polish economist, LGBTQ+ rights activist and writer. She has campaigned for marriage equality, was the editor of Polish LGBT magazine Inaczej and has contributed to books on LGBT+ issues. When then Mayor of Warsaw, Lech Kaczyński refused allow gay pride in Warsaw in 2005, she was among the activists who challenged this decision at the European Court of Human Rights.

== Biography ==
Kostrzewa was educated at the T. Baird State Music School. She graduated with a master's degree in management from the University of Warsaw in 1998.

Kostrzewa has been an activist with LGBT organization Lambda Warsaw since 1998, serving as chairwoman (2005–2007) and spokeswoman (2002–2022). She has campaigned for marriage equality, has highlighted issues for Polish same sex couples around taxation, housing, inheritance and burial rights after the death of a partner, and has challenged homophobia in Poland. She is also a member of the LGBT organization Trans-Fuzja's council and the Congress of Women Council.

In 2005, then Mayor of Warsaw, Lech Kaczyński, refused to allow the gay pride parade in Warsaw, locally known as the Parada Równości (equality parade), to take place in the city. Tomasz Bączkowski, Tomasz Szypuła and Kostrzewa challenged this decision at the European Court of Human Rights with support from the Helsinki Foundation for Human Rights. The court found in the case of Bączkowski and Others v. Poland that the ban was an infringement of freedom of assembly under Article 11 of the European Convention on Human Rights.

Kostrzewa volunteered as an editor of the Polish LGBT magazine Inaczej. In 2024, she co-authored the publication How to write and talk about LGBTQIA+ persons. She has also contributed to books regarding queer history and culture in Warsaw.
