= Navalny (disambiguation) =

Navalny is a Ukrainian surname.

- Alexei Navalny (1976–2024) was a Russian opposition leader and lawyer.
- Yulia Navalny (born 1976) is a Russian public figure and economist.
- Maryna Navalny (born 1971) is a Ukrainian journalist, deputy, doctor of philological sciences, professor.

Navalny may also refer to:

- Navalny 35, a group of citizens of Russia involved in the poisoning and imprisonment of Alexei Navalny
- Navalny (film), a 2022 documentary film

== See also ==
- Navalnyy v. Russia, a human rights case
