= Grodzki =

Grodzki, feminine Grodzka is a Polish-language surname. Notable people with this surname include:

- Anna Grodzka (born 1954), Polish politician
- Tomasz Grodzki (born 1958), Polish politician, doctor and surgeon
