= Jacek Kochanowski =

Polish sociologist and philosopher (born 1973)

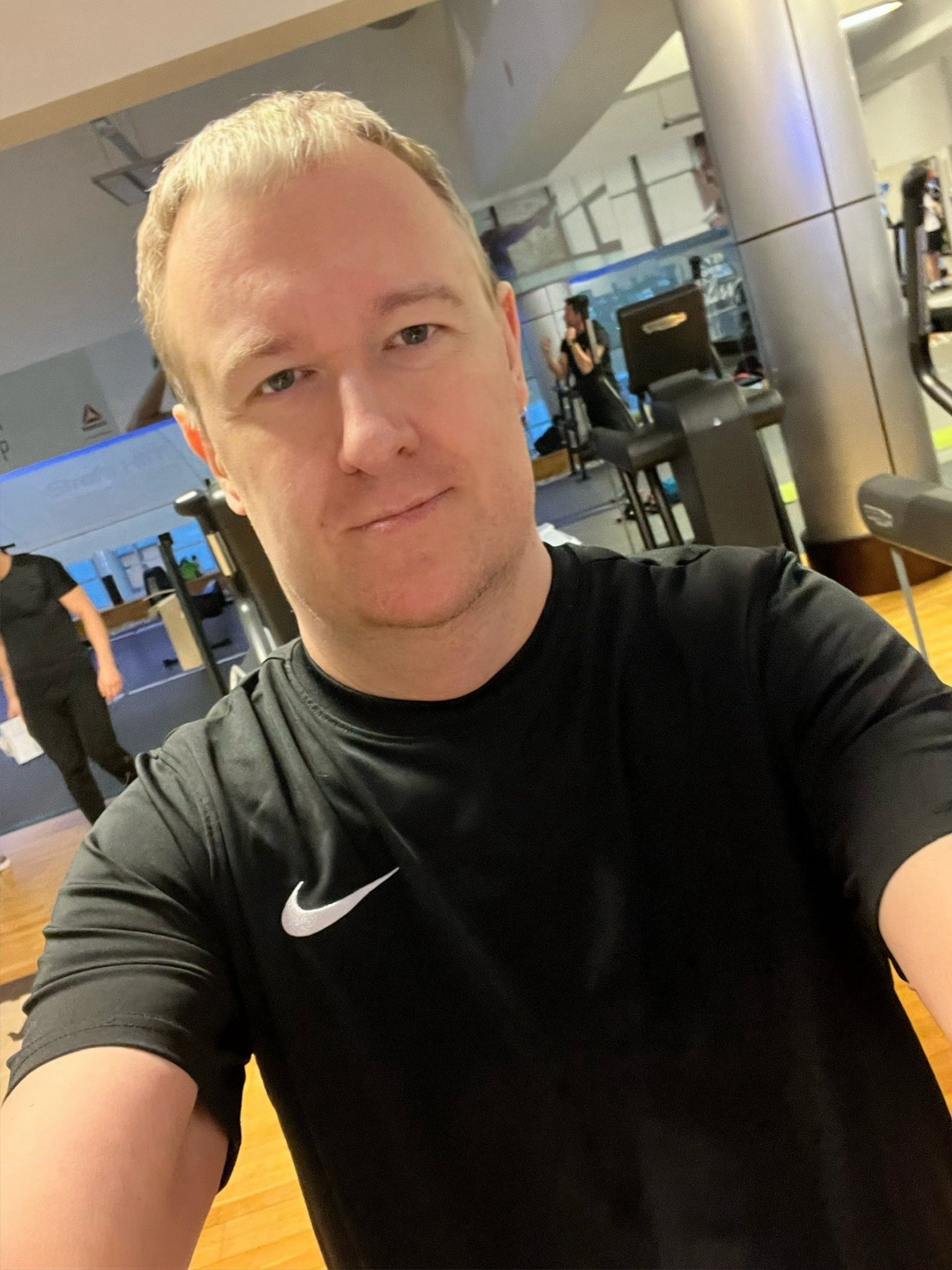
- Jacek Kochanowski, 2023
- Born: 27 May 1973; Mińsk Mazowiecki
- Citizenship: Polish
- Occupations: Sociologist, philosopher

Jacek Kochanowski (born 27 May 1973) is a sociologist, philosopher and activist specializing in gender and queer studies, columnist, professor at the University of Warsaw.

== Biography ==
In 2003 he obtained doctorate upon the dissertation Przemiany tożsamości gejów. Analiza genealogiczno-dekonstrukcyjna. In 2011 he obtained habilitation.

He was one of the initiators of Campaign Against Homophobia. He obtained doctorate in sociology from the University of Warsaw in 2003. He was an assistant of MP Anna Grodzka.

== Books ==
=== Monographs ===
- Fantazmat zróżNICowany. Socjologiczne studium przemian tożsamości gejów. Kraków: Wydawnictwo Universitas. 2004. ISBN 83-242-0308-7. Pp. 328.
- Spektakl i wiedza. Perspektywa społecznej teorii queer, Wydawnictwo Wschód-Zachód. Łódź. 2009. ISBN 978-83-61422-12-9. Pp. 311.
- Socjologia seksualności. Marginesy. Warszawa: Wydawnictwo Naukowe PWN. 2013. ISBN 978-83-01-17341-8. Pp. 227.
- Brunatna fala. Socjologia nowego faszyzmu w Polsce. Warszawa: Instytut Wydawniczy Książka i Prasa. 2025. ISBN 978-83-66615-01-4. Pp. 270.

=== Editions ===
- Teatr płci: eseje z socjologii gender. Łódź: Wydawnictwo „Wschód-Zachód”. 2008. ISBN 978-83-61422-04-4. Pp. 294. Edited by, with Małgorzata Bieńkowska-Ptasznik.
- Społeczeństwo, wiedza, demokracja. Łódź: Wydawnictwo Wschód-Zachód. 2008. ISBN 978-83-61422-00-6. Pp. 320. Edited by.
- Egzamin zawodowy. Obszary problemowe. Warszawa: Centrum Badań Polityki Naukowej i Szkolnictwa Wyższego UW. 2009. ISBN 978-83-927745-8-7. Pp. 190. Edited by, with Elżbieta Drogosz-Zabłocka.
- Nowe studia kulturowe. Warszawa: Wydawnictwa Uniwersytetu Warszawskiego. 2014. ISBN 978-83-235-1544-9. Pp. 232. Edited by, with Tomasz Wrzosek.
