= Article 18 of the European Convention on Human Rights =

Article 18 of the European Convention on Human Rights (ECHR) states:

The restrictions permitted under this Convention to the said rights and freedoms shall not be applied for any purpose other than those for which they have been prescribed.

This Article means that it is a violation of the ECHR for a state to restrict a listed human right for any reason other than the one formally given and allowed under the Convention; "there can be no inherent or implied limitations on the rights guaranteed. Each limitation must be expressed and have an explicit purpose". According to Gomien, Article 18 can only be invoked with regards to one of the substantive rights guaranteed by the ECHR.

In terms of comparison to other human rights instruments, this Article is reasonably unique: there is no such provision in the Universal Declaration of Human Rights or in the International Covenant on Civil and Political Rights. There is, however, a similar provision in Article 30 of the American Convention on Human Rights:

The restrictions that, pursuant to this Convention, may be placed on the enjoyment or exercise of the rights or freedoms recognized herein may not be applied except in accordance with the laws enacted for reasons of general interest and in accordance with the purpose for which such restrictions have been established.

== Application ==
Article 18 must always operate in tandem with another article of the ECHR, although that Article need not necessarily be violated, as explained by the Court in Gusinskiy v Russia:

“Article 18 of the Convention does not have an autonomous role. It can only be applied in conjunction with other Articles of the Convention. There may, however, be a violation of Article 18 in connection with another Article, although there is no violation of that Article taken alone.”

Article 18 is designed to target ulterior motives for restricting human rights. This article has most frequently been invoked by those claiming the state is attempting to restrict the individual's ability to participate in politics. Article 18 is likely to be applicable in four situations:

- Where an Article has a limitation clause which specifically qualifies the right.
- Where Convention Articles expressly exclude certain areas or persons from the guarantee of protection.
- General restrictions under certain Articles (for example, Articles 15, 16, and 17). This cannot apply to Articles which contain non-derogable rights.
- It may also apply to inherent limitations that have been confirmed to exist in case law.

The onus is on the applicant to show an abuse of power by the state, or a breach of the principle of good faith. This is a heavy burden to establish as there is a presumption that power has not been misused, meaning that although over 200 cases on this Article have been heard, only four violations of Article 18 have ever been found by the European Court of Human Rights. This is exacerbated by the reluctance of the Court to rely on Article 18 rather than the other Article invoked in the case. Beddard argues that Article 18 has also proved difficult to apply due to the Court's broad interpretation of the interests listed under the Convention, and the application of the doctrine of the margin of appreciation.

A finding that Article 18 has been violated does not directly lead to specific consequences, although like any other ECHR violation, Article 46 of the ECHR requires the State to take action to redress the individual's rights.

=== Successful claims ===
==== Lutsenko v Ukraine ====
In this case Lutsenko, the former minister of internal affairs of Ukraine, argued that the real reason he had been arrested and detained was for publicly claiming his innocence in relation to accusations made against him. The European Court of Human Rights found that alongside Article 5, Article 18 of the Convention had been violated by Ukraine. Ukraine pardoned Lutsenko on 7 April 2013 and released him.

==== Gusinskiy v Russia ====
Gusinskiy v Russia saw the applicant argue that the state had forced him to sell his media business to a state petroleum company (Gazprom) on unfavorable terms while he was imprisoned (in exchange for the charges being dropped), which was an abuse of power. Both Article 5(1)(c) and Article 18 were held to be violated, with the Court saying that it was "not the purpose of such public law matters as criminal proceedings and detention on remand to be used as part of commercial bargaining strategies".

==== Tymoshenko v Ukraine ====
Tymoshenko v Ukraine was a claim by former Ukrainian Prime Minister, Yulia Tymoshenko. She alleged her arrest was politically motivated. After the European Court of Human Rights released its finding of a breach of Article 18, this was used by Tymoshenko and her supporters to claim that she was a 'political prisoner'. The spokesperson for the Court, Roderick Liddell, then felt compelled to clarify the judgment, saying that the Court had found the pre-trial detention of Tymoshenko to be unnecessary and based on grounds that are not listed in Article 5 (namely, a judge detaining her because she had been disrespectful during a hearing), rather than agreeing with the argument that she had been detained in order to inhibit her political participation. Tymoshenko was released on 22 February 2014.

==== Cebotari v Moldova ====
Cebotari v Moldova concerned wrongful pre-trial detention. The Court found that Cebotari's detention had been arbitrary (and therefore contrary to Article 5 ECHR), as it was not based upon a 'reasonable suspicion', meaning "the existence of facts or information which would satisfy an objective observer that the person concerned may have committed the offence". Instead, the detention had been a mechanism for pressuring Cebotari to stop other proceedings before the European Court of Human Rights.

==== Ilgar Mammadov v Azerbaijan ====
Ilgar Mammadov v. Azerbaijan concerned the restriction of applicant’s liberty for purposes other than bringing him before competent legal authority on reasonable suspicion of having committed an offence. The applicant’s arrest had been linked to his specific blog entries, in particular, his post of 28 January 2013 which included sourced information shedding light on the "true causes" of the Ismayilli protests, which the Government had reportedly attempted to withhold from the public and which had immediately been picked up by the press.

Even though the prosecution had not made any express references to the applicant’s blog entries, the accusations against him had first been made in the official press statement issued a day after the post, and he had first been invited to the Prosecutor General’s Office for questioning on the same day. There was nothing in the case file to show that the prosecution had any objective information giving rise to a bona fide suspicion against the applicant at that time, and it had not been shown that they were in possession of any such information or witness statements at any point prior to his arrest.

The above circumstances indicated that the actual purpose of the impugned measures had been to silence or punish the applicant for criticising the Government and attempting to disseminate what he believed to be true information the Government were trying to hide. Accordingly, the restriction of the applicant’s liberty had been applied for purposes other than bringing him before a competent legal authority on reasonable suspicion of having committed an offence.

=== Unsuccessful claims ===
==== Khodorkovskiy and Lebedev v Russia ====
Khodorkovskiy and Lebedev v Russia involved a claim by Mikhail Khodorkovsky that his criminal prosecution was politically motivated, breaching Article 18. Alongside this, Kordorkovskiy claimed violations of Articles 3 and 5 of the ECHR. Several of Khodorkovskiy's claims succeeded; two violations of Article 3 were found due to the conditions of his detainment in court and the remand prison, one violation of Article 5(1)b regarding his apprehension by police, one violation of Article 5(3) regarding the length of his detainment pending investigation and trial, and four procedural flaws violating Article 5(4).

While the actions of the Russian government were condemned by the European Court of Human Rights, and violations of Khodorkovsky's human rights were found, in terms of the alleged violation of Article 18 it was said that there had not been incontestable evidence of the state being politically motivated. The Court stated:

"[T]he whole structure of the Convention rests on the general assumption that public authorities in the member States act in good faith. That assumption is rebuttable in theory, but it is difficult to overcome in practice: the applicant alleging that his rights and freedoms were limited for an improper reason must convincingly show that the real aim of the authorities was not the same as that proclaimed (or as can be reasonably inferred from the context). Thus the Court has to apply a very exacting standard of proof to such allegations".

Khodorkovskiy's lawyers claimed the finding of human rights violations by the Russian state as sufficient victory, as a court will very rarely attribute a bad faith motive to a government.

==== Kamma v The Netherlands ====
Kamma's detention and remand for alleged extortion was allowed under Article 5(1)(c), however, the police used this time to investigate him for murder. Under Dutch law, the suspicion of murder would have been enough to detain him on remand anyway, it was simply that the wrong procedure had been used. No breach of the Convention was found by the European Commission of Human Rights (now abolished).

=== No necessity to decide the issue ===
In the majority of cases, the Court has found that no separate issues arise under Article 18. This generally occurs in four situations:

- The Court finds no violation of the other Convention right, so the argument of violation of Article 18 is considered unsubstantiated.
- Violation of the other Convention right is found, rendering a separate examination under Article 18 unnecessary: considerations of the misuse of state power have been 'absorbed' into the initial assessment.
- The purpose of the restricting measure was found to be legitimate under the limitation clause of the other right invoked, making further examination unnecessary.
- The purpose of the restricting measure was found to be illegitimate under the limitation clause of the other right invoked, making further examination unnecessary.

==== Handyside v United Kingdom ====
Handyside v United Kingdom is a case largely known for its extension of the protection of freedom of expression, however, Article 18 was also argued. The applicant argued that The Little Red Schoolbook had been seized in the United Kingdom to prevent the development of modern teaching techniques, rather than to protect morals. The Commission chose to consider the matter solely under Article 10(2), taking the motivations of the state into consideration in deciding whether the limit on freedom of expression was justified. However, the Commission did go on to say that it did not consider any evidence to have been presented of motives that are not legitimate under Article 10(2).

==== Bozano v France ====
Bozano alleged breach of Article 5 through his deportation from France to Switzerland and consequent deprivation of his liberty. The Commission found the deportation to be unlawful, as there had been a judicial veto on Bozano's extradition. It made no express finding under Article 18, simply saying the detention did not fall under Article 5(1)(f), detention with a view to deportation.

==== United Communist Party of Turkey v Turkey ====
This case centred around the dissolution of the United Communist Party of Turkey by the Constitutional Court of Turkey. The applicants included an allegation of breach of Article 18 in their complaint. In view of the finding that there had been a violation of Article 11, the Commission did not consider it necessary to decide whether Article 18 had been complied with.
