= Equality Parade (Warsaw) =

Annual LGBT event in Warsaw, Poland

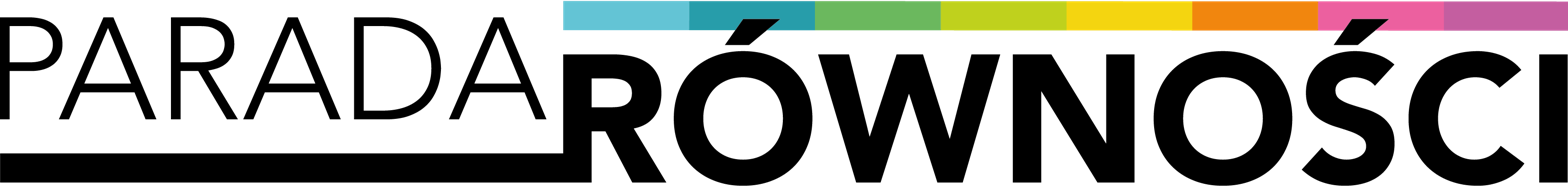

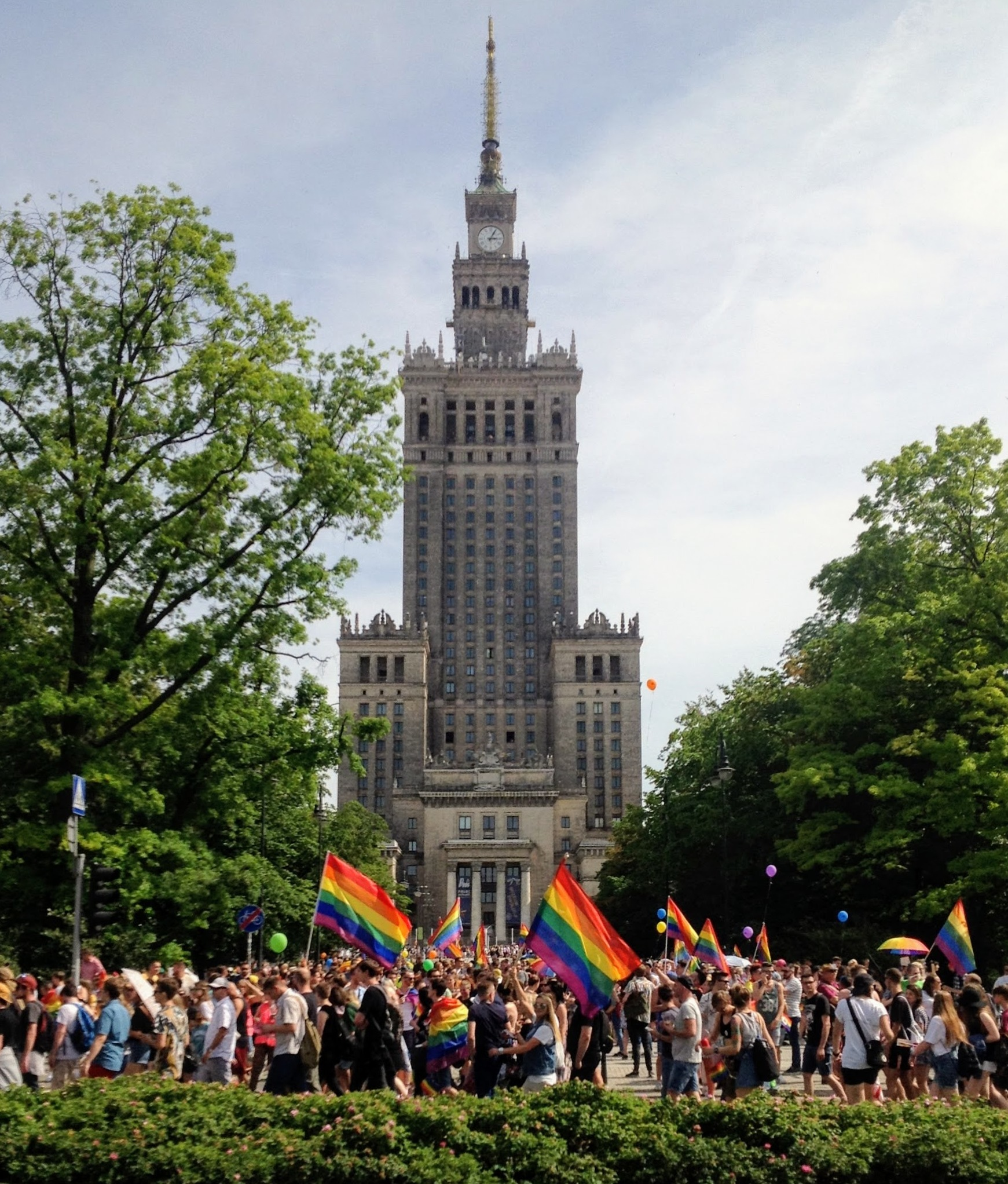
- Genre: Pride parade and festival
- Locations: Warsaw, Poland
- Inaugurated: 2001
- Organizer: Fundacja Wolontariat Równości
- Website: www.paradarownosci.eu

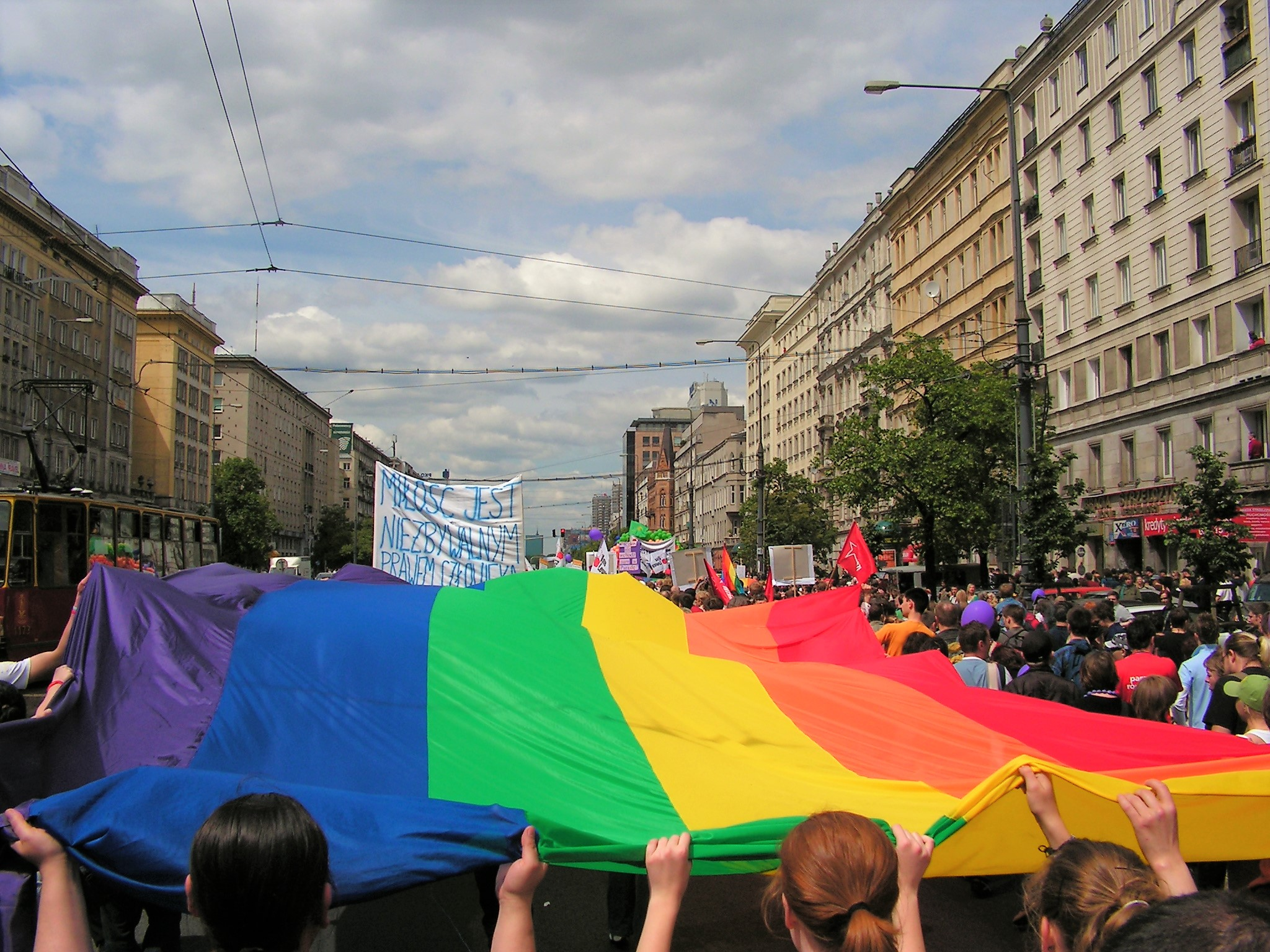
Parada Równości in 2006

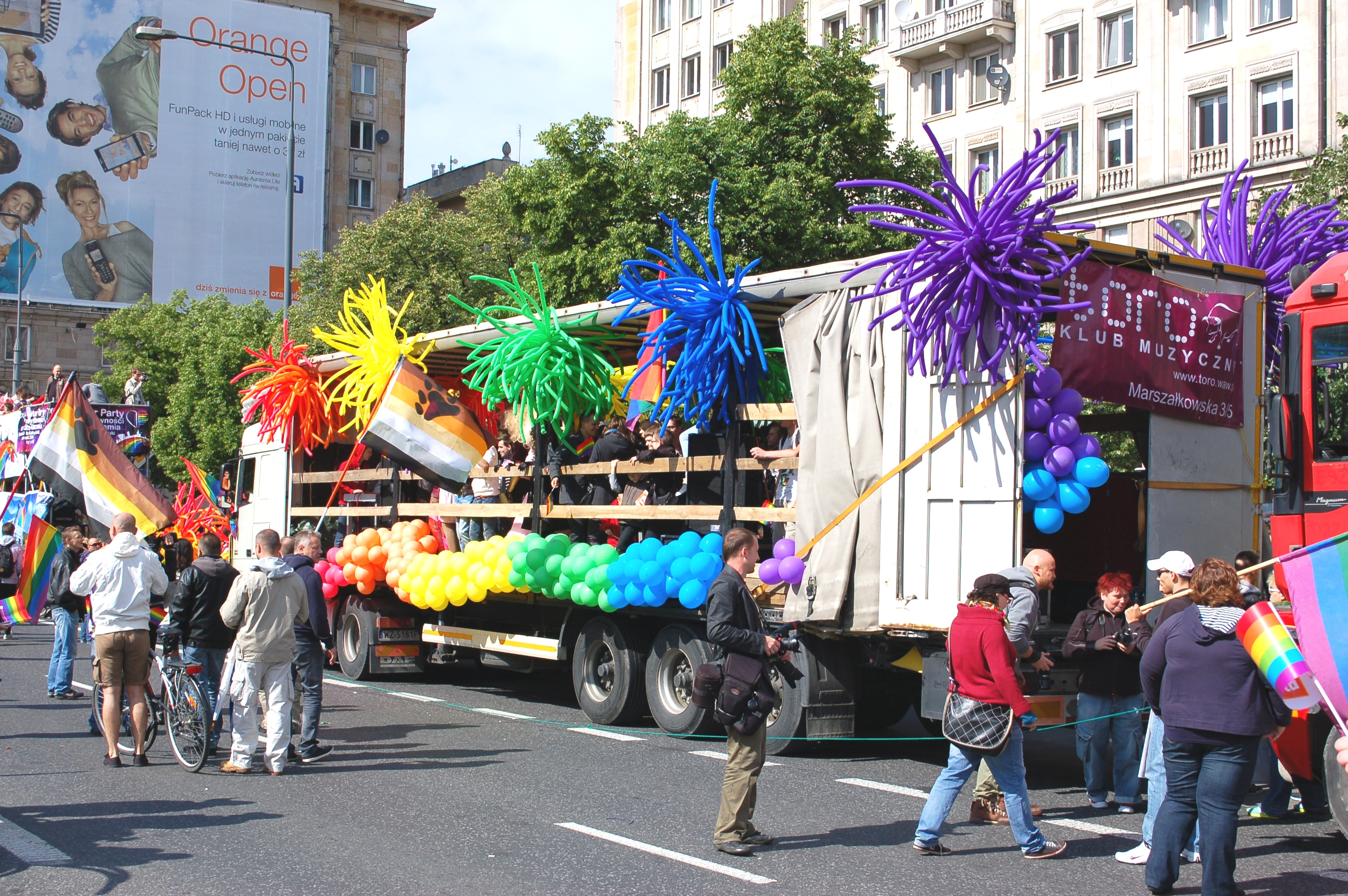
Parada Równości in 2012

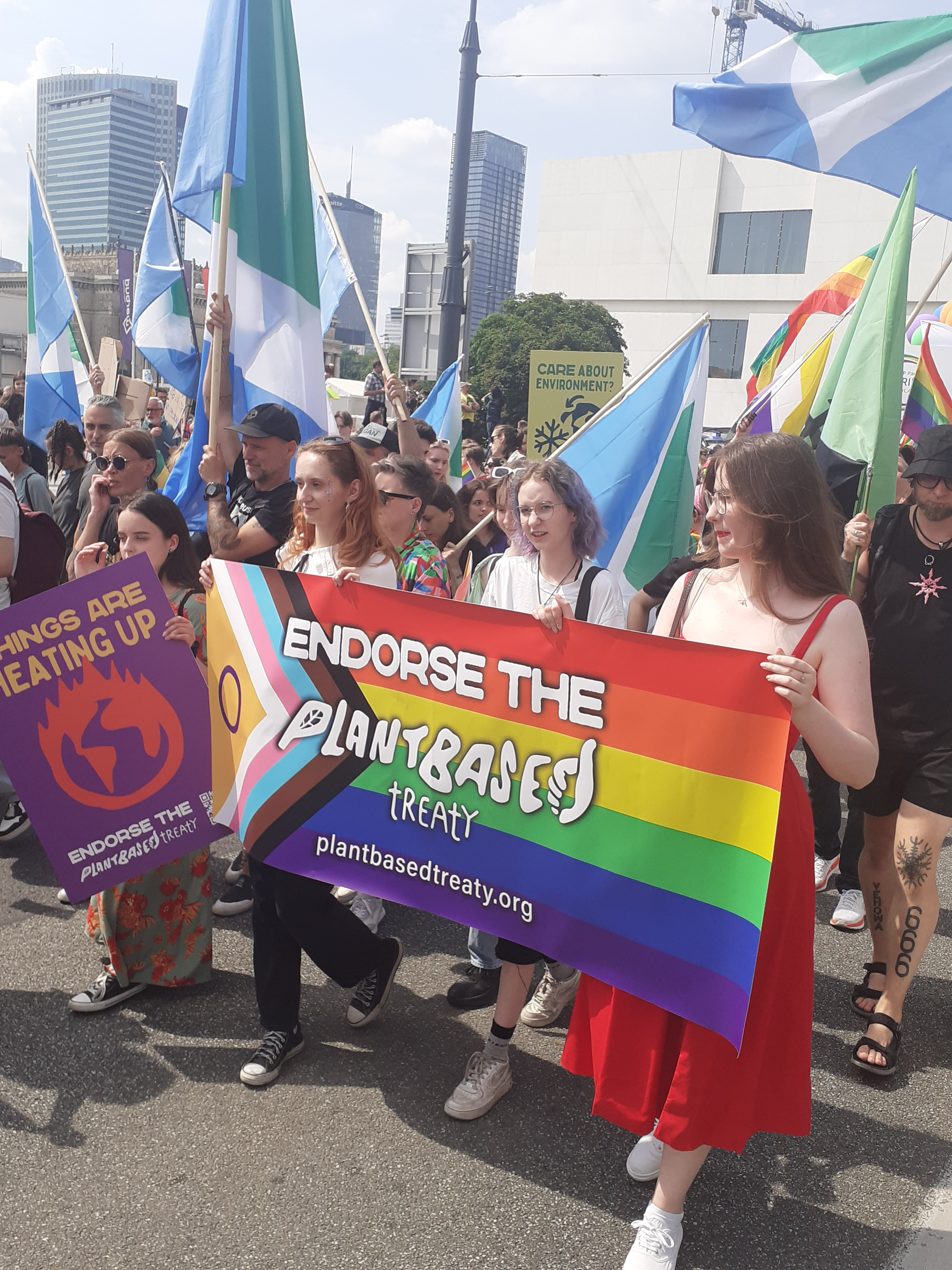
Parada Równości in 2023

Equality Parade (Polish: Parada Równości) is an LGBTQ community pride parade held in Warsaw since 2001, usually in May or June. It has attracted at least several thousand attendees each year; 20,000 attendees (the largest number of any year prior to 2017) were reported in 2006, following an official ban in 2004 and 2005. In 2018, there were 45,000 attendees. In 2019, there were 50,000 attendees and then powering up to 80,000 in 2023. It is a member of EPOA and InterPride.

It is the largest gay pride parade in Central and Eastern Europe, and has been described as "the first Europe-wide gay pride parade held in a former Communist bloc country".

== Goals ==
The organizers of the parade want to promote social equality in general, and draw attention to the problems faced by the LGBT community in Poland. Its organizers, including Szymon Niemiec (who founded the event in 2001), stress that the parade is meant to highlight not only the LGBT movement, but the rights issues of all minorities.

== History ==
Though efforts toward an LGBT parade in Poland were made at least as early as 1998, Poland's first successful parade, in Warsaw, was organized in 2001 through the efforts of gay rights activist Szymon Niemiec. The second and third parades were held in 2002 and 2003. That year there were some 300 marchers. The 2002 parade was estimated to have at least 1500 attendees, and the 2003 event attracted about 3000.

In 2004 and 2005, officials denied permission for the parades, citing the likelihood of counter-demonstrations, interference with religious or national holidays, lack of a permit, and other reasons. The parades were vocally opposed by conservative Law and Justice party's Lech Kaczyński (at the time mayor of Warsaw and later president of Poland) who said that allowing an official gay pride event in Warsaw would promote a homosexual lifestyle.

In protest, a different event, Wiec Wolności ("Freedom Veche"), was organized in Warsaw in 2004, and was estimated to have drawn 600 to 1,000 attendees. In response to the 2005 ban, about 2,500 people marched on 11 June of that year, an act of civil disobedience that led to several brief arrests. Tomasz Bączkowski, Tomasz Szypuła and Yga Kostrzewa also challenged this decision at the European Court of Human Rights with support from the Helsinki Foundation for Human Rights. The court found that in the case of Bączkowski and Others v. Poland that the ban was an infringement of freedom of assembly under Article 11 of the European Convention on Human Rights.

The 2006 parade was held without official interference, and is estimated to have gathered about 20,000 attendees. In May 2007 the ban has been declared discriminatory and illegal by the European Court of Human Rights' Bączkowski v. Poland ruling. That month, the 2007 parade gathered about 4000 attendees.

The 2008 march attracted "several thousands" again, and the 2009, "over 2,000". In 2010 the event was not held, as Warsaw hosted the international EuroPride event, drawing a crowd of around 8,000. This event was organized privately and required an entrance fee, which was the cause of controversy.

The parades have been organized annually since, and attendance has grown substantially over the years, from about 4000 to 6000 attendees in 2011, 18,000 in 2015, to about 45,000 attendees in the 2018 parade. On 8 June 2019, around 50,000 marched in the event. Mayor Rafał Trzaskowski participated in the event twice as well as granted the festival city patronate. Due to the COVID-19 pandemic, the 2020 edition of the parade was called off. It rebooted on 19 June 2021, and again, the mayor Rafał Trzaskowski participated in the event, granting the parade city hall patronage. Although no accurate number of participants was officially announced, selected media stated that there were "thousands" present at the event. In 2022, the march was held alongside KyivPride, which, due to the 2022 Russian invasion of Ukraine causing many Ukrainians to flee the country and Russian aerial bombing campaigns, could not hold an event in the city. In addition to LGBT rights, the march also focused on supporting Ukraine and calling for peace.

A recurring demand of the parade is the recognition of same-sex unions in Poland.

== See also ==
- Tęcza (Warsaw)
- Warsaw Gay Movement
