= Homofonia =

Polish television program

Homofonia was the first gay interest TV talk-show in Poland in 2006–2008 on iTV network. It was dedicated entirely to the gay community. The topics of the show ranged from "Is gay OK?" to "Gay Art". The program was somehow controversial, even before the first episode aired. The most notable guests so included Maciej Nowak and Krystian Legierski.

== See also ==
- Gay life in Poland
