= Inaczej =

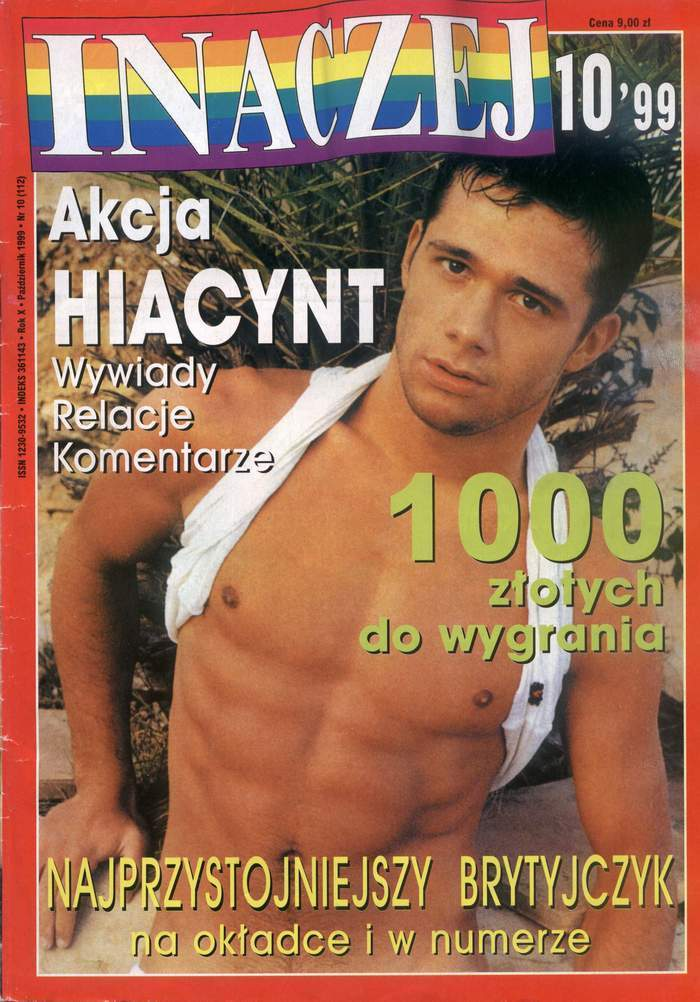
- Inaczej, October 1999 cover
- Editor: Andrzej Bulski
- Frequency: monthly
- Publisher: Agencja Wydawniczo-Reklamowa „Softpress”
- Paid circulation: 50 000 per month
- First issue: 1990
- Final issue: 2002
- Country: Poland
- Based in: Poznań
- Language: Polish
- ISSN: 1230-9532

Inaczej (pol. Differently) was a Polish monthly magazine, in circulation from June 1990 until May 2002.. It had a social and political profile, and was meant for reading by Polish LGBT community. It also contained soft erotica. The publisher was publishing company Softpress from Poznań.. During the whole period of publication of the magazine, the editor-in-chief was Andrzej Bulski. The secretary of editors was Marek Piochacz. Employees of the magazine were Marcin Krzeszowiec and Sergiusz Wróblewski.

== History ==
The original title was "Miesięcznik Kochających Inaczej" (pol. "People's Loving Differently Monthly"). After one of the changes of the look of the magazine, it was changed into the last word, written in capital letters.

The magazine was mostly edited by a group of journalists-volunteers. The longest cooperation with the title was done by: Leszek Bolewski, Yga Kostrzewa, Maciej Wawrzyniak, Karol Martel, Marta Maciejewska, Marek Mrok, Andrzej Selerowicz, Waldemar Zboralski, Tomasz Stankiewicz, Krzysztof Halama, Tomasz Pniewski, Pierre Mika and Aleksander Stuglik, who published his short stories in the magazine.

During the 12 years of the magazine's existence, it has interviewed more than 100 people. The people were both politicians of the left wing and liberal options, but also artists, actors, journalists, scientists and social activists, such as: Leszek Miller, Aleksander Kwaśniewski, Zofia Kuratowska, Zbigniew Siemiątkowski, Maryla Rodowicz, Marek Kotański, Tomasz Raczek, Mariusz Szczygieł.

The magazine informed about legal and propaganda actions against LGBT society by various world institutions, including various churches and governments of countries. Inaczej warned about risks related to, for instance, traveling to the regions of the world where homosexual people were physically persecuted. It demanded explanations about Operation Hyacinth and the so-called pink card index (pol. różowe teczki). The magazine informed in detail about political deeds of the European Union which were supportive of gays and lesbians. On its pages, there were also published personal ads.

Inaczej also informed about political and social movements which the editors defined as far right and warned Polish politicians about the risks related to them. They published lists of people that the editors deemed homophobic in Poland and other countries.

After the end of publication of Inaczej, there were other magazines that were meant to take its place - "On i On" (pol. He and He) and "InterHome", also published by Softpress.

The publisher also created its own Internet portal – polgej.pl.

== See also ==
- Filo (magazine)
