= Bączkowski and Others v. Poland =

2007 European Court of Human Rights case

Decided 3 May 2007
- Full case name: Bączkowski and Others v. Poland
- Case: 1543/06
- ECLI: ECLI:CE:ECHR:2007:0503JUD000154306
- Nationality of parties: Polish

Ruling
- Poland's ban on a Warsaw pride parade is incompatible to the Convention

Instruments cited
- Articles 11, 13 and 14 of the European Convention on Human Right

Keywords
- LGBT rights, freedom of expression

Bączkowski and Others v. Poland was a European Court of Human Rights case which ruled unanimously that the banning of an LGBT pride parade in Warsaw, locally known as the Parada Równości (equality parade), in 2005 was in violation of Articles 11, 13 and 14 of the European Convention on Human Rights.

== Background ==
In 2005, the Mayor of Warsaw, Lech Kaczyński (later President of Poland), refused to allow a gay pride parade to take place through the city, justifying his decision by the fact that the organisers had not submitted a traffic organisation plan, that such a parade would promote a "homosexual lifestyle" in Warsaw, and that he is against "propagating gay orientation". Despite this, on 11 June 2005, approximately 2500 people marched, in defiance of the ban.

One day before the parade, on 10 June 2005, the organisers appealed to the Governor of the Mazowsze Voivodship, arguing that the city's decision had breached their right to peaceful assembly. The Governor ruled that the city's requirement of a traffic organisation plan had been unlawful and that the parade was unlawfully restricted. Despite this, further proceedings were discontinued considering that the parade had taken place on 11 June 2005.

On 16 December 2005, the organisers of the parade, headed by Tomasz Bączkowski Tomasz Szypuła and Yga Kostrzewa, began a court case against the Republic of Poland at the European Court of Human Rights, alleging that their right to peaceful assembly had been breached and that they had been treated in a discriminatory manner, considering that other marches were allowed to take place on June 11. The ECHR accepted the case on 5 December 2006.

== Judgment ==
The European Court of Human Rights ruled that, even though the march still took place, the fact that it was banned by the city authorities represents an infringement of freedom of assembly under Article 11 of the European Convention on Human Rights. Additionally, the ruling affirmed that:

The positive obligation of a State to secure genuine and effective respect for freedom of association and assembly was of particular importance to those with unpopular views or belonging to minorities, because they were more vulnerable to victimization.

The court also stated that Poland had violated Article 14 of the Convention, because other marches which had taken place on the same day were not subject to the same conditions as the gay rights march and were allowed to take place.

Furthermore, the court ruled that Article 13 of the Convention, relating to the right to an effective remedy, had been violated in that the organisers did not have any legal procedure at their disposal which would have enabled them to appeal the decision before the date on which the march was set to be held.

== Reactions ==
The ruling was hailed by LGBT rights groups as a landmark decision for the rights of LGBT people to freedom of assembly. According to Robert Biedroń, the leader of Campaign Against Homophobia, a Polish LGBT rights organisation, the ruling represented a "very important step towards equality for gay and lesbian people in Poland and... also in several other countries in central and eastern Europe."

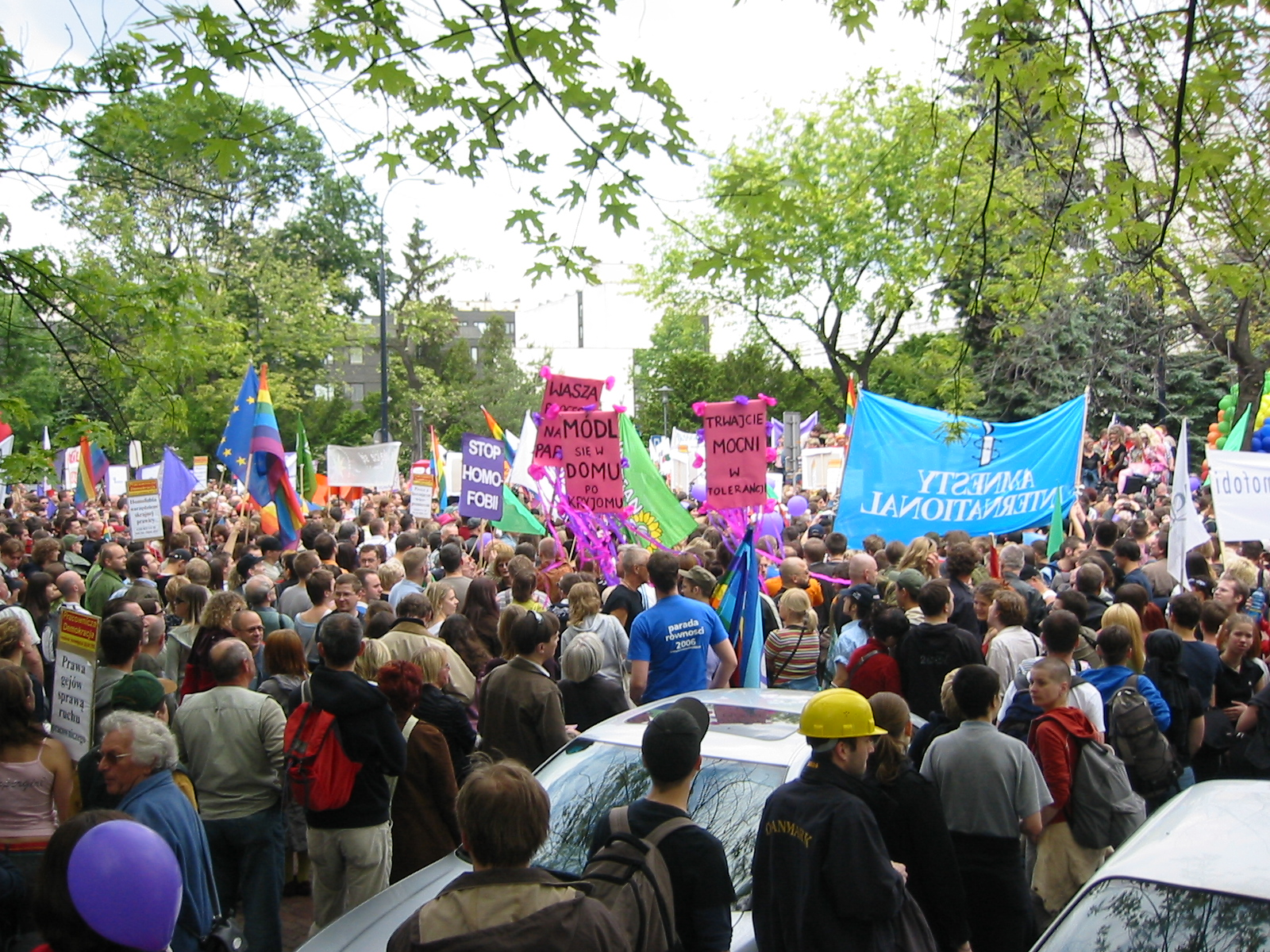
Parada Równości 2006

Michael Cashman, the head of the European Parliament's Intergroup on Gay and Lesbian Rights, stated that:

I am extremely pleased by this ruling. It is a vindication of everything that we have been saying about the actions of the Government of Poland against the fundamental freedoms of Polish LGBT men and women.

Sarah Ludford, a Liberal Democrat MEP from the United Kingdom, declared that, "this judgement is extremely important as it is the first time that the European Court of Human Rights has ruled specifically on the question of banning Equality and Gay Pride marches. Its clarification that freedom of assembly applies fully to these events is, while fully expected, nonetheless welcome."

No official reaction has yet been released by the Polish authorities. However, the Secretary of State, Maciej Lopinski, stated that "the president [Lech Kaczynski] may take further action", and in 2007 there have been some speculation that the president of Poland may appeal against the verdict (which did not happen).

== See also ==
- Gay rights in Poland
- List of LGBT-related ECHR cases
- Moscow Pride
