= Plattform "Ärzte für das Leben" v. Austria =

European Court of Human Rights case

Plattform "Ärzte für das Leben" v. Austria (10126/82) was a landmark case decided by the European Court of Human Rights in 1988.

== Facts ==
On 28 December 1980, the anti-abortion NGO "Ärzte für das Leben" (Physicians for Life) organised a religious service and a march to the surgery of a doctor who carried out abortions in Stadl-Paura. A number of counter-demonstrators disrupted the march to the hillside by mingling with the marchers and shouting down their recitation. At the end of the ceremony, special riot-control units – which had until then been standing by – formed a cordon between the opposing groups. One person caught in the act of throwing eggs was fined. The association lodged a disciplinary complaint against the police for failing to protect the demonstration, which was refused, and later a constitutional complaint. The Constitutional Court held that it had no jurisdiction over the case.

A second demonstration against abortion was held by "Ärzte für das Leben" in the cathedral square in Salzburg on 1 May 1982. Some 350 people shouting their opposition had gathered outside the cathedral. Policemen formed a cordon around the "Ärzte für das Leben" demonstrators to protect them from direct attack, and later cleared the square to prevent the religious ceremony being disrupted. In view of the Constitutional Court's decision the "Ärzte für das Leben" considered that a second appeal would have served no purpose.

== Proceedings ==
The Plattform "Ärzte für das Leben" association applied to the commission on 13 September 1982, alleging violations of Articles 9 (conscience and religion), 10 (expression), 11 (association) and 13 (effective remedy) of the European Convention on Human Rights. In 1985, the European Commission of Human Rights declared inadmissible the complaints under Articles 9, 10 and 11, and admissible the complaints under Article 13 (states' obligation to provide an effective remedy before a national authority for alleged violations of Convention). In 1987, the Commission delivered a report, considering that Article 13 was not violated.

== Judgment ==
In a unanimous judgment, the Court had found no violation of Article 13. Regarding the events in Stadl-Paura, it stated that "no damage was done nor were there any serious clashes". Regarding the events in Salzburg, it stated that "a hundred policemen were sent to the scene to separate the participants from their opponents and avert the danger of direct attacks; they cleared the square so as to prevent any disturbance of the religious service." It had decided that there was no violation of Article 13, since it "clearly appears that the Austrian authorities did not fail to take reasonable and appropriate measures. No arguable claim that Article 11 was violated has thus been made out; Article 13 therefore does not apply in the instant case."

The most famous conclusion of the judgment is that

A demonstration may annoy or give offence to persons opposed to the ideas or claims that it is seeking to promote. The participants must, however, be able to hold the demonstration without having to fear that they will be subjected to physical violence by their opponents; such a fear would be liable to deter associations or other groups supporting common ideas or interests from openly expressing their opinions on highly controversial issues affecting the community. In a democracy the right to counter-demonstrate cannot extend to inhibiting the exercise of the right to demonstrate. Genuine, effective freedom of peaceful assembly cannot, therefore, be reduced to a mere duty on the part of the State not to interfere: a purely negative conception would not be compatible with the object and purpose of Article 11. Like Article 8, Article 11 sometimes requires positive measures to be taken, even in the sphere of relations between individuals.
