= Berufsverbot =

Order of "professional disqualification" under German law

A Berufsverbot ("professional ban") in Germany is a state‑imposed prohibition preventing an individual from exercising a profession, occupational field, trade, or branch of trade. It can be imposed in criminal proceedings by a court, as well as by the competent professional authorities, such as medical, legal, or trade supervisory bodies. Outside such proceedings, professional bans have also been issued for political reasons.

This is distinct from an employment‑law Beschäftigungsverbot ("employment restriction"), which prohibits an employer from employing a worker for health‑protection reasons, such as under the Maternity Protection Act (Mutterschutzgesetz).

== In Nazi Germany ==
Under the 1933 Law for the Restoration of the Professional Civil Service, the Nazi government in Germany prohibited many Jews, artists, political opponents, and others from working in certain professions.

== Post-World War II ==
After 1945, the Allied authorities in Germany imposed professional bans on several filmmakers associated with Nazi propaganda. Leni Riefenstahl received a de facto lifelong Berufsverbot in the German film industry, although she continued to work abroad as a photographer and filmmaker.

== 1972 Anti-Radical Decree ==
On 28 January 1972, the federal government and the premiers of the West German states instituted the so-called Radikalenerlass ("Radicals Decree"). Under this decree, individuals considered to be members of, or aligned with, extremist organisations were barred from working as civil servants (Beamte), a category that in Germany includes public‑sector occupations such as teaching. The decree was issued in response to terrorism by the Red Army Faction.

Critics referred to the measure as a Berufsverbot ("professional ban"), arguing that it violated the freedom of occupational choice guaranteed by the Basic Law. Legal scholars generally avoid this term, as the decree did not in itself prohibit the practice of a profession.

The decree was applied unevenly after 1979. Many German states later repealed the relevant regulations, and in 2016 the Landtag of Lower Saxony formally condemned the practice. Other states, such as Bavaria, continue to apply the decree.

== Treatment under Council of Europe law ==
In at least one case (Vogt v. Germany, 1995), the European Court of Human Rights found Germany in breach of its responsibilities to a citizen (Dorothea Vogt, a dismissed teacher who was an active member of the German Communist Party) under Article 10 (right to freedom of expression) and Article 11 (right to freedom of assembly and association) of the European Convention on Human Rights. The government subsequently settled with her, providing compensation for her time without full earnings, topping up her pension rights for that period, as well as other modest damages and costs.

== See also ==
- Disbarment
