= LGBTQ rights in Poland =

- Location of Poland (dark green) – in Europe (light green & dark grey) – in the European Union (light green) – [Legend]
- Legal status: Always legal in Polish legislation (Russian Empire, Kingdom of Prussia and Austria-Hungary Empire laws criminalizing same-sex intercourse were in force to 1932; German laws criminalizing same-sex intercourse were in force from 1939 to 1945 during Nazi occupation)
- Gender identity: Transgender people allowed to change legal gender
- Military: Lesbians, gays and bisexuals allowed to serve openly, transgender people are not included
- Discrimination protections: Sexual orientation protections in employment (see below)

Family rights
- Recognition of relationships: Marriages concluded in other EU member states are recognized
- Adoption: Same-sex couples not allowed to adopt

Lesbian, gay, bisexual, transgender, and queer (LGBTQ) people in Poland face legal challenges not experienced by non-LGBTQ residents. According to ILGA-Europe's 2025 report, the status of LGBTQ rights in Poland is among the worst of the European Union countries.

Pride flag of Poland

Both male and female same-sex sexual activity were decriminalized in 1932, when the country introduced an equal age of consent for homosexuals and heterosexuals, which was set at 15. Poland provides LGBTQ people with the same rights as heterosexuals in areas such as: gay and bisexual men are allowed to donate blood, gays and bisexuals are allowed to serve openly in the Polish Armed Forces, and transgender people are allowed to change their legal gender following certain requirements, which include undergoing hormone replacement therapy. Polish law bans employment discrimination based on sexual orientation, although such protections may not be effective in practice. No current protections for health services and hate crimes exist, however an amendment to hate crime laws that covers sexual orientation and sex/gender is in consideration. In 2019, the Constitutional Tribunal ruled that the provision of Polish Petty Offence Code, which made it illegal to deny goods and services without "a just cause", was unconstitutional.

Article 18 of the Polish Constitution states that "Marriage, as a union of a man and a woman, shall be placed under the protection and care of the Republic of Poland." According to several jurists, this article bans same-sex marriage. The Supreme Court, the Constitutional Tribunal and the Supreme Administrative Court have ruled that Article 18 of the Constitution limits the institution of marriage to opposite-sex couples, and that the legalization of same-sex marriage would require a constitutional amendment. While ahead of the 2015 Polish parliamentary election, the ruling Law and Justice (PiS) party had taken an anti-migrant stance, and in the run-up to the 2019 Polish parliamentary election, PiS focused on countering alleged Western "LGBT ideology". Encouraged by national PiS politicians, by April 2020, 100 municipal councils (from villages to five voivodships), informally declared themselves "free from LGBT ideology", but by 6th February 2024 Warsaw Voivodship Administrative Court repealed the last of these declarations.

On 20 July 2019, a violent counter-protest took place during the first Equality March in Białystok. Police estimated that about 800 peaceful marchers were confronted by more than 4,000 counter-protesters, heavily outnumbering the attendees. Eyewitnesses, journalists, and human rights monitors documented that counter-protesters indiscriminately threw stones, bricks, firecrackers, flash bombs, rotten eggs, and bottles filled with urine at marchers, including children and teenagers, requiring heavy riot police intervention to prevent mass casualties.

Opinion polls on the public perception of LGBTQ rights in Poland have been contradictory, with many showing large support for registered partnerships, and some indicating a majority of opponents. Many left-wing and liberal political parties, namely the New Left, Labour Union, the Social Democratic Party, Modern, Together and Spring, have expressed support for the gay rights movement. In November 2023, a same-sex married couple issued Polish courts to rectify the legality of same-sex marriages. On 20 March 2026, the Supreme Administrative Court of Poland has ruled that civil-registry offices must recognise and transcribe marriage certificates of same-sex couples married in another EU member state. The ruling was first implemented by the Warsaw registry office on 14 May 2026.. However, on July 28, 2026, the Polish Constitutional Tribunal ruled that the transcription of same-sex marriages is incompatible with the Polish Constitution.

For years, the ultra-conservative organization "Fundacja Pro Prawo do Życia" operated "homophobuses" (homofobusy), vans featuring large banners, crossed-out rainbow flags, and defamatory imagery equipped with loudspeakers through major Polish cities. The audio loops blasted by these vans explicitly linked homosexuality to pedophilia and framed non-heterosexual orientations as psychiatric disorders. Under the conservative Law and Justice (PiS) administration, authorities and the police heavily protected the vans under the banner of "freedom of speech," frequently arresting citizens who attempted to physically block the vehicles.

A 2025 study by the business coalition Open for Business estimated that workplace exclusion and diminished public health outcomes cost the Polish economy up to 20.4 billion PLN annually due to talent loss and systemic discrimination.

== Legality of same-sex sexual activity ==
During the Partitions of Poland (1795–1918) and the German occupation of Poland (1939–1945), laws prohibiting homosexuality were imposed on some territories that make up the modern Polish state. A notable exception was the Napoleonic Code, which was introduced in 1808 and decriminalized homosexuality in parts of Poland until it was overturned by a Tsarist decree in 1835.

Following World War I, same-sex activity continued to be formally criminalized in now-independent Poland, because the penal codes of the Russian Empire, the Kingdom of Prussia and the Austria-Hungarian Empire remained in power. They mostly criminalized male same-sex acts, though the Austrian code included broader provisions against so-called "same-sex fornication" and was also used against women.

The new Polish Penal Code of 1932 (Kodeks karny) decriminalized consensual same-sex acts. The decision had already been taken in the early 1920s and represented the success of long-lasting transnational advocacy. Homosexual prostitution remained illegal. According to lawyer Monika Płatek, these provisions were applied very broadly to homosexual couples to prevent them living together; any type of gift or paying for a partner's food, clothing, or lodging could be interpreted as prostitution.

In 1948 during the Polish People's Republic, age of consent was set to 15, equal to that of heterosexual partners. Homosexual prostitution was legalized in 1969. Homosexuality was removed from the list of diseases in 1991.

== Recognition of same-sex relationships ==
There is no legal recognition of same-sex couples in Poland, though cohabiting same-sex couples do enjoy certain limited benefits, namely in the tenancy of a shared household, the right not to testify against the partner and residency rights under EU law. Same-sex marriage is not recognized, and Article 18 of the Constitution of Poland states that "Marriage, being a union of a man and a woman, as well as the family, motherhood and parenthood, shall be placed under the protection and care of the Republic of Poland." This has led to much debate over whether or not it is a definitive ban on same-sex marriage. A 2019 ruling from an administrative court provided a justification for a single verdict against same-sex marriage, stating in ruling binding only on the parties in the proceedings that the language in Article 18 does not explicitly ban same-sex marriage. Earlier judgments of the Supreme Court, the Constitutional Tribunal and the Supreme Administrative Court have found the Constitution bans same-sex marriage by defining marriage as a heterosexual-only institution.

Historian Kamil Karczewski has documented a homosexual relationship that could be considered the first known case of a same-sex relationship founded on commitment and a vow in Poland's history. This union involved Marian Kuleszyński and Stefan Góralski, residents of the Suwałki region in the early 1920s. Although kept secret and devoid of legal recognition, their commitment was founded on loyalty, the presumption of permanence, and a 'friendship for life oath' that included vows never to separate, to defend and support each other, and to maintain the confidentiality of their relationship. This published case offers insights into the complexities of same-sex relationships in earlier times.

A civil union bill was first proposed in 2003. In 2004, under a left-wing Government, the Senate approved the bill allowing gay and lesbian couples to register their relationship. Parties to a civil union under the bill would have been given a great range of benefits, protections and responsibilities (e.g. pension funds, joint tax and death-related benefits), currently granted only to spouses in a marriage, although they would not have been allowed to adopt children. The bill lapsed in the 2005 general election, however.

The major opposition to introducing same-sex marriages or civil unions comes from the Roman Catholic Church, which is influential politically, holding a considerable degree of influence in the state. The Church also enjoys immense social prestige. The Church holds that homosexuality is a deviation. In 2012, the nation was 95% Roman Catholic, with 54% practicing every week.

In January 2013, the Sejm voted to reject five proposed bills that would have introduced civil partnerships for both opposite-sex and same-sex couples. The High Court later issued an opinion stating that the bills proposed by the Democratic Left Alliance, Your Movement and Civic Platform were all unconstitutional, as Article 18 of the Constitution protects marriage. In December 2014, the Sejm refused to deal with a civil partnership bill proposed by Your Movement, with 235 MPs voting against debating the bill, and 185 MPs voting for. In May 2015, the Sejm again refused to deal with the topic, with 215 MPs voting against and only 146 for. Prime Minister Ewa Kopacz said that civil partnerships were an issue for the next Parliament to deal with. A new partnership bill was proposed on 12 February 2018 by the Modern party.

In June 2018, the European Court of Justice ruled that EU members states must grant married same-sex couples, where at least one partner is an EU citizen, full residency rights and recognise their freedom of movement.

On 29 May 2026, the Sejm passed the "Act on the Status of the Closest Person in a Relationship" (Polish: Ustawa o statusie osoby najbliższej w związku). Under the proposed bill, two adults would be able to sign a notarized agreement granting them limited cohabitation rights, including shared property arrangements, maintenance obligations, joint property and tax settlements, and access to their partner's medical information. Katarzyna Kotula welcomed the vote, calling the bill "the first law in [Poland's] history that gives the possibility of recognizing same-sex unions." The legislation now moves to the upper-house Senate before heading to President Karol Nawrocki, who is aligned with the conservative opposition. On 27 May, Paweł Szefernaker, the head of Nawrocki's cabinet stated: "There is not and will not be consent from the president for the introduction or legalisation of civil partnerships". Speaking just ahead of the Sejm vote, Nawrocki himself confirmed this stance, stating: "I am the guardian of the Constitution that states explicitly that marriage is a union between a man and a woman." However, the president added that he would be willing to sign limited cohabitation rights, provided they do not mirror the legal framework of civil partnerships.

Poland continued to deny recognition to same sex couples, and in July 2020, the European Court of Human Rights notified the Polish government of cases filed by Polish same-sex couples, inviting the Polish government to present its position on the issue (Andersen v. Poland).

During Polish re-elections in September 2023, Donald Tusk proposed recognition for same-sex civil partnerships. Opposition parties won most seats in the parliament and senate, giving hope to the LGBT community that the bill might be approved. But some analysts say that even if the bill is passed, it may still get vetoed by conservative president Andrzej Duda, who previously described the LGBT movement as "a foreign ideology" and comparing it to indoctrination in the Soviet Union. In November 2023, a Polish same-sex married couple (wed by Germany's marriage law) asked Poland's top court to overturn the nation's ban on same-sex marriage.

Poland has not implemented the contracting or recognition of same-sex unions, although it is obliged to do so by judgments of the European Court of Human Rights:

- Andersen v. Poland (2025) concerning the registration of a foreign marriage certificate and the practical hardships of non-recognition (such as the necessity of seeking judicial protection for ordinary needs, existing in a legal limbo, and the forced adjustment of behaviour to secure alternative legal recognition) impacting a non-resident of Poland,
- Formela v. Poland (2024) regarding the state's obligation to ensure that the applicants have a specific legal framework providing for the recognition and protection of their unions,
- Przybyszewska and Others v. Poland (2023) regarding the recognition of civil partnerships in Poland, similar to Oliari v. Italy and Fedotova v. Russia, but concerning Poland,
- Szypuła and Others v. Poland (2025) in connection with the refusal to issue certificates to the applicants stating the absence of circumstances excluding the conclusion of marriage abroad (certificate of no impediment).

The ECHR also issued a decision in 2025 in the case of Gruszczyński-Ręgowski and Others v. Poland, in which the Tribunal decided to strike the applications out of the list of cases pursuant to Art. 37 § 1 of the Convention due to unilateral declarations by the Government acknowledging a violation of Art. 8 of the Convention and a declaration to pay the applicants Barabasz and Kowalska the amount of 2,000 euros as reimbursement of costs..

In a judgment of November 25, 2025, the CJEU ruled, also citing judgments of the European Court of Human Rights, that "a Member State is obliged to recognize a marriage of two citizens of the Union of the same sex legally concluded in another Member State, in which they exercised their freedom of movement and residence". The judgment is based on the case Coman v General Inspectorate for Immigration of the Ministry of Internal Affairs [Romania], which was decided in 2018.

=== Parliament vote on civil unions ===
Sejm vote on civil partnerships
Date	On	For	Against	Withheld	Result
25 January 2013	Registered partnership	150	276	23	No
25 January 2013	Registered partnership	138	284	28	No
25 January 2013	Registered partnership	137	283	30	No
25 January 2013	Registered partnership	137	283	30	No
25 January 2013	Partnership agreement	211	228	10	No
18 December 2014	Registered partnership	185	235	18	No
26 May 2015	Registered partnership	146	215	24	No
13 February 2026	Registered partnership	233	199	3	Yes
13 February 2026	Registered partnership	232	202	2	Yes

=== Limited cohabitation rights ===
On 23 February 2007, the Appeals Court in Białystok recognized a same-sex cohabitation. On 6 December 2007, this ruling was confirmed by the Supreme Court of Warsaw.

While Poland possesses no specific law on cohabitation, it does have a few provisions in different legal acts or Supreme Court rulings that recognise relations between unmarried partners and provides said partners specific rights and obligations. For example, Article 115(11) of the Penal Code (Polish: Kodeks karny) uses the term "the closest person", which covers romantic relations that are not legally formalised. The status of "the closest person" gives the right of refusal to testify against the partner. The term "partner" includes same-sex couples.

A resolution of the Supreme Court from 28 November 2012 (III CZP 65/12) on the interpretation of the term "a person who has lived actually in cohabitation with the tenant" was issued with regard to the case of a gay man who was the partner of a deceased person, the main tenant of the apartment. The Court interpreted the law in a way that recognised the surviving partner as authorised to take over the right to tenancy. The Court stated that the person actually remaining in cohabitation with the tenant – in the meaning of Article 691 § 1 of the Civil Code – is a person connected with the tenant by a bond of emotional, physical and economic nature. This also includes a person of the same sex. Previously, in March 2010, the European Court of Human Rights ruled, in the case of Kozak v. Poland, that LGBT people have the right to inherit from their partners.

== Adoption and parenting ==
Same-sex couples are unable to legally adopt in Poland. Furthermore, lesbian couples do not have access to IVF.

In October 2018, the Supreme Administrative Court ruled that a lesbian couple may register their 4-year-old boy as their child. Polish media described the case as "the first of its kind in Poland".

In July 2020 the President of Poland formally proposed an amendment to the Constitution that would ban adoption by a person in a same-sex relationship.

In November 2020 a law was proposed to only allow married couples to adopt. This would make it impossible for same-sex couples to adopt, due to same-sex marriage not being allowed in Poland. Demonstrations were unable to be held, due to the COVID-19 virus.

In March 2021, the Polish government announced a new law that banned the adoption of children by same-sex couples. The law will also require authorities to vet candidates applying for adoption as a single parent to ensure that they are not cohabitating with someone of the same sex.

== Discrimination protections ==
Anti-discrimination provisions were added to the Labour Code (Polish: Kodeks pracy) in 2003. The Polish Constitution guarantees equality in accordance with the law and prohibits discrimination based on "any reason". The proposal to include a prohibition of discrimination on the grounds of sexual orientation in the Constitution was rejected in 1995, after strong Catholic Church objections.

In 2007, an anti-discrimination law was under preparation by the Ministry of Labour that would prohibit discrimination on different grounds, including sexual orientation, not only in work and employment, but also in social security and social protection, health care, and education, although the provision of and access to goods and services would only be subject to a prohibition of discrimination on grounds of race or ethnic origin. On 1 January 2011, a new law on equal treatment entered into force. It prohibits sexual orientation discrimination in employment only. In September 2015, Amnesty International concluded that "the LGBTI community in Poland faces widespread and ingrained discrimination across the country" and that "Poland's legal system falls dangerously short when it comes to protecting lesbian, gay, bisexual, transgender and intersex (LGBTI) people and other minority groups from hate crimes".

Between 2015 and 2020, the Polish government has worked to reduce the effectiveness of the anti-discriminatory protections granted to LGBT people under EU law. Examining recent anti-discrimination cases, legal scholar Marcin Górski found that "the principle of equal treatment in Poland appears generally ineffective".

In June 2018, the Polish Supreme Court ruled that a Łódź printer acted illegally when he refused to print banners for an LGBT business group. The court argued that the principle of equality meant the printer did not have the right to withhold services from the business. The court also ruled that sexual orientation, race or other features of a person cannot be the basis for refusal to offer a service, but that freedom of conscience and religion must also be taken into account. The Campaign Against Homophobia welcomed the ruling, but it was condemned by Justice Minister Zbigniew Ziobro who called the ruling "against freedom" and "state violence in service of the ideology of homosexual activists". Ziobro filed a case with the Constitutional Tribunal to recognize the provision on the basis of which the printer was convicted as unconstitutional. On 26 June 2019, the Tribunal issued a judgment in which it found that the provision was incompatible with the Polish Constitution.

In July 2020 the government of Poland sued IKEA for firing an employee for severe homophobic remarks he made on the company's internal website. Poland's justice minister Zbigniew Ziobro called the dismissal, which was made in accordance with Poland's anti-discrimination laws, "absolutely scandalous".

The Polish ministry of Justice is funding a campaign for "counteracting crimes related to the violation of freedom of conscience committed under the influence of LGBT ideology", which is meant to protect people who "suffer under the pressure of new leftist ideologies".

=== Hate crime laws ===
As of 2019, a bill is pending in Parliament to provide penalty enhancements if a crime is motivated by the victim's gender, gender identity, age, disability or sexual orientation.

In November 2024, the Polish Prime Minister Donald Tusk agreed to legislation which would add sexual orientation, gender, age and disability into the country's existing hate speech laws. The legislation now heads to the Parliament where it must receive a majority of votes to become law.

On 17 April 2025, President Andrzej Duda vetoed the bill.

== Gender identity and expression ==
Legal gender changes have been performed since the 1960s. Transgender people seeking to change their legal gender must receive a medical diagnosis. Only after the legal gender has been changed does a transgender individual gain the right to undergo sex reassignment surgery. The reason for this is because any surgery resulting in infertility is prohibited by Polish law (as stated in Polish Penal Code: Kodeks Karny art. 156 §1), with a few exceptions in cases such as uterine cancer or myoma. That is, castration on request is illegal and transgender individuals must first seek to change their legal gender, due to a medical diagnosis not being sufficient.

In July 2015, the Polish Sejm approved a transgender recognition bill. Under the bill, transgender people would have been able to change gender without any physical interventions, but would have required statements from mental health experts that they are suffering from gender dysphoria. The bill was approved 252 to 158. The Senate proceeded to approve the bill in August, but President Andrzej Duda vetoed it in October. The Parliament failed to override his veto.

Until March 2025, a transgender individual who wanted to change their legal gender had to file a lawsuit against their parents. On 4 March 2025, the Civil Chamber of the Supreme Court of Poland in its resolution simplified the foregoing practice, stating that the process should take place before the court in a non-trial proceeding, only on the request of the concerned party, in the mode of a rectification of the vital records. (Note: The resolution alleges here to the Article 36 of the Vital Records Law of 28 November 2014 (Dz.U. 2014 poz. 1741, further amended).) The only other participant in the proceeding may be the proponent's spouse, and a positive review from the court is to be effective immediately.

== Military service ==
Since the 1990s, lesbian, gay and bisexual people are not banned from military service and discrimination against them is officially forbidden. However, there is an unwritten rule of "don't ask, don't tell" and most gay Polish soldiers conceal their sexual orientation. In 2013, military personnel told NaTemat.pl portal that openly gay personnel would face social difficulty, especially for higher ranks, as for "commanding staff—officers and high-ranking NCOs—admitting to same-sex attraction would mean losing respect—qualities without which you simply cannot be a commander".

Openly transgender people are officially barred from military service on the medical grounds. Diagnosis of gender dysphoria results in being automatically assigned as "permanently and completely unfit for military service, both in the time of conflict and peace".

== Conversion therapy ==
In February 2019, Modern MPs alongside Campaign Against Homophobia activists submitted a draft bill to the Sejm to ban gay conversion therapy. The draft bill aims to ban using, promoting or advertising conversion practices. It will also prohibit promoting people or entities that offer, use, advertize or promote the pseudoscientific practice. The MPs plan to introduce the bill to the Polish Parliament where it will have its first reading in the upcoming months. Such a ban would implement the recommendation of the European Parliament and United Nations Independent Expert on Protection against violence and discrimination based on sexual orientation and gender identity.

In August 2020, the Polish Episcopal Conference released a document which recommended the creation of counseling centres "to help people who want to regain their sexual health and natural sexual orientation". It insists that the scientific consensus that conversion therapy is ineffective and potentially harmful to be "political correctness".

== Blood donation ==
In 2005 the Ministry of Health has changed the laws regarding blood donation, eliminating the "risk groups" that included gay men, and replaced them with "risk behaviours" such as frequent changes in sexual partners, or having sexual relations with a HIV-positive persons. As "risk behaviours" can be performed by a person regardless of gender or sexuality, that ensured legal right for queer people to donate blood as long as they have met other requirements.

Despite that, as late as in August 2007 Regional Blood Donation and Treatment Center in Bydgoszcz (Polish: Regionalne Centrum Krwiodawstwa i Krwiolecznictwa w Bydgoszczy, or RCKiK Bydgoszcz) has included questions about same sex relations among both men and women in their mandatory questionaries, as brought to attention in a letter by Campaign Against Homophobia. In a response letter later the same month RCKiK Bydgoszcz has made a choice to reevaluate their questionaries in favour of more non discriminatory language.

In 2008, the National Blood Center proposed regulations banning blood donation by gay and bisexual men, and addition of a question "Have you, as a man, ever had any sexual relations with another man?" into the mandatory pre-donation questionaries. The proposal was quickly rejected by the Institute of Hematology and Transfusion Medicine.

== Social attitudes and public opinion ==
According to Gregory E. Czarnecki, there are some similarities between antisemitism and homophobia in Polish nationalist discourse, especially that both groups are seen as deviant and diseased as well as a threat to the nation.

=== 2000–2010 ===
A survey from 2005 found that 89% of the population considered homosexuality an unnatural activity. Nevertheless, half believed homosexuality should be tolerated.

An opinion poll conducted in late 2006 at the request of the European Commission indicated that Polish public opinion was overwhelmingly opposed to same-sex marriage and to adoption by same-sex couples. A 2006 Eurobarometer poll found that 74% and 89% of Poles respectively were opposed to same-sex marriage and adoption by same-sex couples. Of the EU member states surveyed, only Latvia and Greece had higher levels of opposition. A poll in July 2009 showed that 87% of Poles were against gay adoption. A poll from 23 December 2009 for Newsweek Poland reported another shift towards more positive attitudes. Sixty percent of respondents stated that they would have no objections to having an openly gay minister or a head of government.

A 2008 study revealed that 66% of Poles believed that gay people should not have the right to organize public demonstrations, 69% of Poles believed that gay people should not have the right to show their way of life. Also, 37% of Poles believed that gay people should have the right to engage in sexual activity, with 37% believing they should not.

In 2010, an IIBR opinion poll conducted for Newsweek Poland found that 43% of Poles agreed that openly gay people should be banned from military service. 38% thought that such a ban should not exist in the Polish military.

=== 2011–2020 ===
In 2011, according to a poll by TNS Polska, 54% of Poles supported same-sex partnerships, while 27% supported same-sex marriage.

In a 2013 opinion poll conducted by CBOS, 68% of Poles were against gays and lesbians publicly showing their way of life, 65% of Poles were against same-sex civil unions, 72% were against same-sex marriage and 88% were against adoption by same-sex couples.

In a CBOS opinion poll from August 2013, a majority (56%) of respondents stated that "homosexuality is always wrong and can never be justified". 26% stated that there is nothing wrong with it and can always be justified". 12% were indifferent.

A CBOS opinion poll from February 2014 found that 70% of Poles believed that same-sex sexual activity "is morally unacceptable", while only 22% believed it "is morally acceptable".

An Ipsos survey in October 2019 found that a majority of Polish men under 40 believe that "the LGBT movement and gender ideology" is the "biggest threat facing them in the 21st century".

=== Opinion polls ===
Support for the recognition of same-sex relationships	2001		2002		2003		2005		2008		2010		2011		2013		2017		2019		2022	
Support for the recognition of same-sex relationships	YES	NO	YES	NO	YES	NO	YES	NO	YES	NO	YES	NO	YES	NO	YES	NO	YES	NO	YES	NO	YES	NO
"registered partnerships"	–	–	15%	76%	34%	56%	46%	44%	41%	48%	45%	47%	25%	65%	33%	60%	36%	56%	35%	60%	64%	30%
"same-sex marriages"	24%	69%	–	–	–	–	22%	72%	18%	76%	16%	78%	25%	65%	26%	68%	30%	64%	29%	66%	48%	42%
"adoption rights"	8%	84%	–	–	8%	84%	6%	90%	6%	90%	6%	89%	–	–	8%	87%	11%	84%	9%	84%	24%	66%

Support for LGBT parenthood	2014	
Support for LGBT parenthood	YES	NO
right for a lesbian to parent a child of her female partner	56%	35%
the situation above is morally acceptable	41%	49%
right for a gay (couple) to foster the child of a deceased sibling	52%	39%
the situation above is morally acceptable	38%	53%

Support for the recognition of same-sex relationships, 2012	opposite-sex couples		same-sex couples	
Support for the recognition of same-sex relationships, 2012	YES	NO	YES	NO
"registered partnerships"	72%	17%	23%	65%
"right to obtain medical information"	86%	–	68%	–
"right to inherit"	78%	–	57%	–
"rights to common tax accounting"	75%	–	55%	–
"right to inherit the pension of a deceased partner"	75%	–	55%	–
"right to a refund in vitro treatments"	58%	–	20%	–
"right to adopt a child"	65%	–	16%	–

Support for the recognition of same-sex relationships	2011 TNS OBOP		2013 Homo Homini		2013 IPSOS		2017 IPSOS		2019 IPSOS	
Support for the recognition of same-sex relationships	YES	NO	YES	NO	YES	NO	YES	NO	YES	NO
"registered partnerships"	54%	41%	55%	39%	39%	24%	52%	43%	60%	
"same-sex marriages"	27%	68%	27%	69%	21%	24%	38%	57%	41%	
"adoption rights"	7%	90%	14%	84%	–	–	16%	80%	21%	

Acceptance of a homosexual as a... (CBOS, July 2005)	Gay (Yes)	Gay (No)	Lesbian (Yes)	Lesbian (No)
Neighbour	56%	38%	54%	40%
Co-worker	45%	50%	42%	53%
Boss	41%	53%	42%	53%
MP	37%	57%	38%	56%
Teacher	19%	77%	21%	75%
Childminder	11%	86%	14%	83%
Priest	13%	82%	–	–

== Public opinion ==
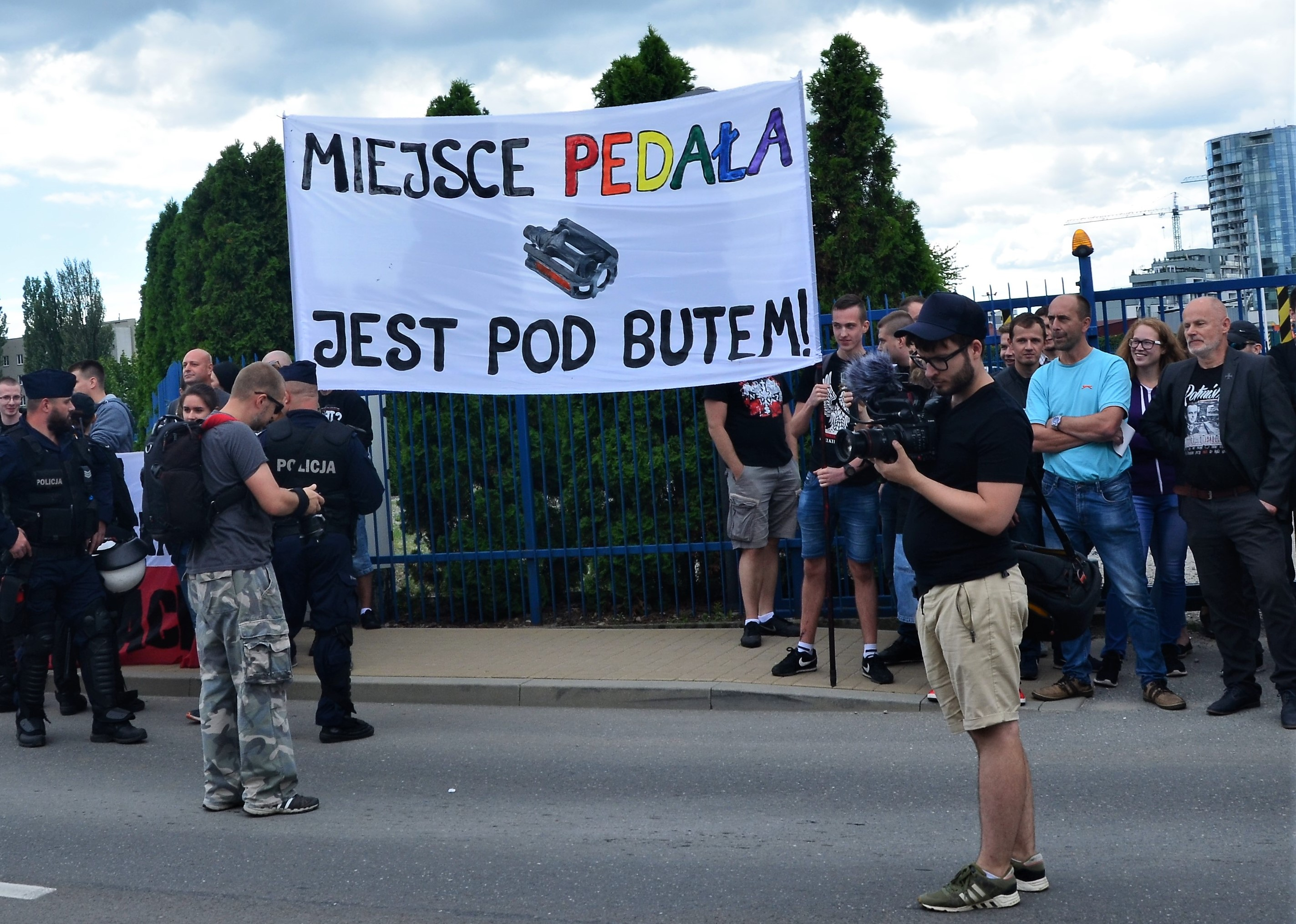
Counter-protest at the 2019 Rzeszów equality march: "a faggot's place is under the boot!"

Public opinion on same-sex marriage (2023) based on Pew Research Center
1. Strongly favor (13.0%)
2. Somewhat favor (28.0%)
3. Not sure (5.00%)
4. Somewhat oppose (18.0%)
5. Strongly oppose (36.0%)

A GLOBSEC survey conducted in March 2023 showed that 54% of Poles supported LGBT rights, such as same-sex marriage, while 38% were opposed.

According to Polish respondents to the European Union Agency for Fundamental Rights 2019 EU LGBTI survey II:

- 83% often or always avoid holding hands with their same-sex partner (61% in the EU at large) — second-highest rate in the EU
- 51% often or always avoid certain locations for fear of being assaulted (33%) — the highest rate in the EU
- 27% are often or always open about being LGBT (47%)
- 26% felt discriminated against at work in the past year (21%)
- 47% felt discriminated against in at least one area of life in the past year (42%)
- 42% were harassed in the past year (38%)
- 15% have been attacked in the past 5 years (11%) — the highest rate in the EU
- 1 in 5 trans and intersex people were physically or sexually attacked in the past five years
- 19% say that LGBTI prejudice and intolerance has dropped in their country in the last five years (40%); 68% say they have risen (36%)
- 4% believe that their national government effectively combats prejudice and intolerance against LGBTI people (33%) — the lowest rate in the EU

According to the survey, Poland has the largest gap in the EU between life satisfaction of LGBTI people and the general population.

The 2023 Eurobarometer found that 50% of Polish people thought same-sex marriage should be allowed throughout Europe (45% disagreed), and 55% agreed that "there is nothing wrong in a sexual relationship between two persons of the same sex".

An Ipsos poll in June 2024 have found that 67% of Poles support the right of same-sex couples to marry or legally register their relationship.

A poll conducted in April 2024 by United Surveys showed growing support for recognition of same-sex families in Poland with 50% of respondents supported same-sex marriage and 66% supported same-sex civil partnership. 86% of supporters of the ruling coalition supported same-sex marriage and 97% supported same-sex civil partnership.

== Politics ==
The parties on the left of the political scene generally approve of the postulates of the gay rights movement and vote in favour of LGBT legislation. The New Left, Modern, Labor United, and Your Movement, are supporters of LGBT rights. More socially right-wing parties, such as PiS, Confederation, Agreement and PSL, are generally against any changes in legislation. Out of these, PiS takes the strongest oppositional stance on homosexual issues.

While the current ruling party Civic Platform was strongly disapproving towards LGBT legislation when it was the ruling party in Poland in 2007–2015, as of late its leaders have started expressing more favourable stances towards the community.

In 2013, former President and Nobel prize winner Lech Wałęsa said that gay MPs should sit at the back of the Parliament or even behind a wall and should not have important positions in Parliament. He also said that pride parades should not take place in the city centres, but in the suburbs of cities. The former president also stated that minorities should not impose themselves upon the majority. Wałęsa could not have been accused of inciting to hatred because the Polish Penal Code does not include inciting to hatred against sexual orientation.

The Council of Europe has highlighted "homophobic statements by leading public figures, creating an atmosphere of hate and intolerance" since 2007. In December 2020, the Council of Europe Commissioner for Human Rights, Dunja Mijatović, stated that she was "deeply concerned about the propagation of negative and inflammatory homophobic narratives by many public officials in Poland, including people in the highest ranks of government... Stigmatisation and hate directed at certain individuals or groups of people carry a real risk of legitimising violence, sometimes with fatal consequences."

=== Law and Justice ===
After the 2005 elections, the Law and Justice party (PiS) came to power. They formed a coalition government with the League of Polish Families (LPR) and the Self-Defence Party (Samoobrona). The politicians of these parties have often been labelled as "homophobic" by LGBT rights activists, both before and after the 2005 elections. Prominent government figures have made several homophobic and unscientific comments with regards to homosexuality, and have tried to suppress freedom of speech and freedom of assembly for LGBT people:

"Let's not be misled by the brutal propaganda of homosexuals' postures of tolerance. It is a kind of madness, and for that madness, our rule will indeed be for them a dark night"

— Kazimierz Michał Ujazdowski, PiS, 3 October 2005

"If a person tries to infect others with their homosexuality, then the state must intervene in this violation of freedom."

— Kazimierz Marcinkiewicz, Prime Minister, PiS, 11 May 2006

"If deviants begin to demonstrate, they should be hit with batons."

— Wojciech Wierzejski, LPR, 9 October 2006

On 5 July 2006, Mayor of Warsaw Miroslaw Kochalski stated, in relation to the Parada Równości, that the march was "immoral and a danger to the inhabitants of Warsaw."

On 7 August 2006, Paweł Zyzak, editor in chief of a PiS magazine, Right Turn!, wrote that homosexuals were "animals" and "the emissaries of Satan sent to destroy the Catholic Church".

In the city of Koscierzyna, Waldemar Bonkowski, a leading member of PiS, hung up a banner that read, "Today it’s gays and lesbians – what's next, zoophilia? Is that liberty and democracy? No, that’s syphilisation! Our Polish pope is looking down from the sky and asking, 'Whither goest thou, Poland?'" on the wall of the local party headquarters.

During the presidential campaign before the 2005 election, Lech Kaczyński, who won the election, stated that he would continue to ban LGBT demonstrations, as he did while Mayor of Warsaw, and that "public promotion of homosexuality will not be allowed".

On 17 March 2008, Kaczyński delivered a presidential address to the nation on public television, in which he described same-sex marriage as an institution contrary to the widely accepted moral order in Poland and the moral beliefs of the majority of the population. The address featured a wedding photograph of an Irish gay rights activist, Brendan Fay and Tom Moulton, which Kaczyński had not sought permission to use. The presidential address outraged left-wing political parties and gay rights activists, who subsequently invited the two to Poland and demanded apologies from the President, which he did not issue.

On 30 August 2006, during a visit to the European Commission, Lech's twin brother, Jarosław Kaczyński, as the Prime Minister of Poland, stated that "people with such preferences have full rights in Poland, there is no tradition in Poland of persecuting such people". He also asked the President of the European Commission, Jose Manuel Barroso "not to believe in the myth of Poland as an anti-Semitic, homophobic and xenophobic country".

Jarosław Kaczyński has been less harsh in his descriptions of homosexuality. In one interview, he stated that he had always been "in favour of tolerance" and that "the issue of intolerance towards gay people had never been a Polish problem". He said he did not recall gays being persecuted in the Polish People's Republic more severely than other minority groups and acknowledged that many eminent Polish celebrities and public figures of that era were widely known to be homosexual. Jarosław Kaczyński also remarked that there are a lot of gay clubs in Poland and that there is a substantial amount of gay press and literature. In another interview abroad, he invited the interviewer to Warsaw to visit one of the many gay clubs in the capital. He also confirmed that there are some homosexuals in his own party, but said they would rather not open their private lives to the public. This was also confirmed by the Member of the European Parliament from PiS, Tadeusz Cymański.

In a 2009 interview for Gazeta Wyborcza, former Polish Prime Minister Kazimierz Marcinkiewicz stated that his opinion about homosexual people changed when he met a Polish gay emigrant in London. The man stated that he "fled from Poland because he was gay and would not have freedom in his country". Marcinkiewicz concluded that he would not want anyone to flee from Poland.

In a 2015 interview, President-elect, Andrzej Duda, originally from the PiS party, was asked if he would hire a homosexual. He answered that he would not care about personal relationships, as long as the person who was to be hired was not running around half-naked. Andrzej Duda also stated that "matters that are vital for society are not dealt with while others, undoubtedly connected with the leftist ideology, are being pushed forward. They are, in my view, destroying the traditional family which, since the dawn of mankind, has assured its development and endurance."

In November 2018, it was reported that President Andrzej Duda would support a ban on "homosexual propaganda", based on the Russian gay propaganda law. He said: "I think that this kind of propaganda should not take place in schools, it has to be calmly and consistently opposed", and that "[i]f such a law was created and would be well written, I do not exclude that I would approach it seriously." Such a law would violate the Polish Constitution and the European Convention on Human Rights.

In November 2018, following government pressure and threats, more than 200 schools cancelled a planned anti-bullying campaign called "Rainbow Friday", which the Campaign Against Homophobia had promoted in hopes of building greater acceptance for LGBT students in Poland and fighting hatred and homophobia in schools. The Minister of Education, Anna Zalewska, had warned that any principals who allowed such events to take place could face negative consequences. She also asked parents to report any such activities to authorities, however it was reported that many students defied the ban and turned up to school in rainbow colors regardless, and that many schools also refused to comply with the warnings.

In April 2019, Conservative party chairman Jarosław Kaczyński called the LGBT rights movement a "foreign imported threat to the nation". During a lecture on patriotism, Kaczynski also said "everyone must accept Christianity". That same month, after an activist displayed posters of the Black Madonna with a rainbow halo, Interior Minister Joachim Brudzinski denounced the posters as "cultural barbarism". The activist was subsequently arrested by the police on charges of "offending religious feelings". Amnesty International condemned the arrest as "just another example of the constant harassment" and said that the activist "now faces up to two years in prison if found guilty under these absurd charges".

In June 2019, the newly appointed Minister of National Education, Dariusz Piontkowski, criticised an LGBT rights declaration that Mayor of Warsaw Rafał Trzaskowski had signed, saying that it was "an attempt to sexualize children by force" and "raise children who will be given away to pedophiles at some point".

For years, the ultra-conservative organization "Fundacja Pro Prawo do Życia" operated "homophobuses" (homofobusy), vans featuring large banners, crossed-out rainbow flags, and defamatory imagery equipped with loudspeakers through major Polish cities. The audio loops blasted by these vans explicitly linked homosexuality to pedophilia and framed non-heterosexual orientations as psychiatric disorders. Under the conservative Law and Justice (PiS) administration, authorities and the police heavily protected the vans under the banner of "freedom of speech," frequently arresting citizens who attempted to physically block the vehicles.

=== League of Polish Families ===
In the 2005 election, the League of Polish Families (LPR) won 8% of the vote and 34 seats in the Sejm. They entered into a coalition government with PiS and Samoobrona. On 19 May 2006, Mirosław Orzechowski, Deputy Minister of Education, stated that an international project organized by LGBT NGOs and financially supported by the European Commission Youth Programme would lead to the "depravity of young people". Wojciech Wierzejski was a Member of the European Parliament, and then a Deputy of the Sejm from the League of Polish Families. In June 2005, while in the European Parliament, he called for "no tolerance for homosexuals and deviants".

On 11 May 2006, while an MP, Wierzejski condemned the Warsaw Parada Równości. While condemning the parade, he stated the "deviants" should be "hit with batons". He also commented on the possible presence of German politicians at the parade, saying that "they are not serious politicians, but just gays and a couple of baton strikes will deter them from coming again. Gays are cowards by definition." A day later, he wrote a letter to the Minister of the Interior and Administration and the Minister of Justice, in which he called for law enforcement agencies to check the legal and illegal sources of financing of the organizations of homosexual activists. He accused LGBT organisations of being involved with paedophiles and the illegal drug trade. He also wished to check if homosexual organisations penetrated Polish schools. In response to this, the State Prosecutor ordered all prosecutors to carefully check the financing of LGBT organizations, their alleged connections to criminal movements and their presence in schools. On 2 June 2006, a complaint about Wierzejski's statements had been rejected by the Warsaw district prosecutor, because "the statements cannot be treated as threatening or encouraging to crime".

On 8 June 2006, Roman Giertych, the Deputy Prime Minister of Poland and Minister of Education, dismissed Mirosław Sielatycki, the director of the National In-Service Teacher Training Centre, because "a lot of books were encouraging teachers to organize meetings with LGBT non-governmental organizations such as Campaign Against Homophobia or Lambda" and because "these books were criticising the legal situation in most European countries, including Poland, in relation to non-recognition of gay marriage as being a form of discrimination". The new director of the centre said that "homosexual practices lead to drama, emptiness and degeneracy."

On 21 May 2006, Roman Giertych said that "LGBT organizations are sending transsexuals to kindergartens and asking children to change their sex".

In March 2007, Roman Giertych proposed a bill that would have banned homosexual people from the teaching profession and would also have allowed sacking those teachers who promote "the culture of homosexual lifestyle". At that time, Giertych was the Deputy Prime Minister of Poland and the Minister of Education. The proposition gained a lot of attention in the media and was widely condemned by the European Commission, by Human Rights Watch, as well as by the Union of Polish Teachers, who organized a march through Warsaw (attended by 10,000 people) condemning the Ministry's policy. The bill was not voted on, and the Government soon failed, leading to new parliamentary elections in which the League of Polish Families won no parliamentary seats.

In 2007, PBS conducted an opinion poll associated with Roman Giertych's speech at a meeting of EU education ministers in Heidelberg. The pollster asked respondents if they agreed with Minister Giertych's statements:

- "Homosexual propaganda is growing in Europe, is reaching the younger children and is weakening the family." – 40% agreed, 56% disagreed.
- "Homosexual propaganda needs to be limited, so children will not have an improper perspective on the family." – 56% agreed, 44% disagreed.
- "Homosexuality is a deviation, we cannot promote as a normal relationship one between persons of the same sex in teaching young people, because objectively they are deviations from the natural law." – 44% agreed, 52% disagreed.

=== Civic Platform ===
In February 2019, Mayor Rafał Trzaskowski, member of the Civic Platform, signed a 12-point LGBT declaration. Proposed actions range from providing shelter to LGBT teenagers rejected by their families, the introduction of local crisis intervention helplines, and providing access to anti-discrimination and sex education at city schools.

=== Your Movement ===
Your Movement supported LGBT rights, including same-sex marriage and civil unions. A prominent party member was a gay activist, former member of the Sejm (2011–2014) and former Mayor of Słupsk (2014–2018) Robert Biedroń.

Biedroń has spoken of significant societal change towards homosexuality and LGBT people. He had occasionally been publicly beaten on the streets and insulted, but said in 2018 that residents now smile and greet him. As a mayor, Biedroń marries local couples. "I’m extremely jealous because I see their happiness. I’m 15 years with my partner and it’s still a dream. It’s not fair that in 2018 two adults cannot get married if they love each other and are committed to each other.", he said.

=== Spring ===
In February 2019, LGBT activist Robert Biedroń launched Spring, a new progressive political party proposing to introduce civil partnerships for opposite-sex and same-sex couples, and the legalisation of same-sex marriage. As of August 2019, the party has three MEPs. The party is now a member of the New Left coalition, which currently serves in government.

=== "LGBT-free zones" ===
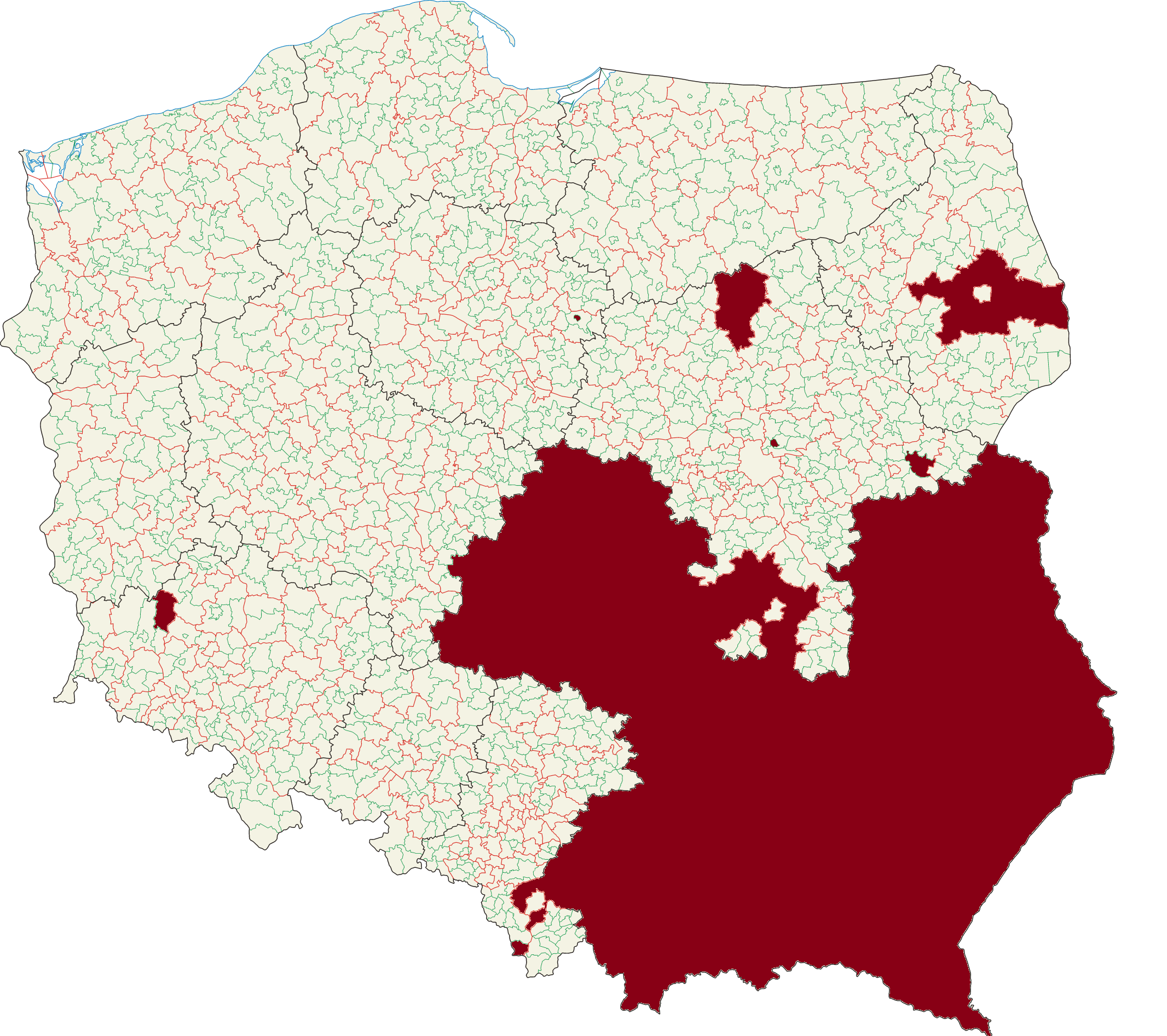
Map of Poland, LGBT-free zones declared (as of January 2020) on a voivodeship, powiat or gmina level marked in red.

While ahead of the 2015 Polish parliamentary election, the ruling Law and Justice (PiS) party took an anti-migrant stance, in the run-up to the 2019 Polish parliamentary election the party has focused on countering Western "LGBT ideology". Several Polish municipalities and four Voivodeships made so-called "LGBT-free zone" declarations, partly in response to the signing of a declaration in support of LGBT rights by Warsaw Mayor Rafał Trzaskowski. While only symbolic, the declared zones signal exclusion of the LGBT community. The right wing Gazeta Polska newspaper issued "LGBT-free zone" stickers to readers. The Polish opposition and diplomats, including US Ambassador to Poland Georgette Mosbacher, condemned the stickers. The Warsaw District Court ordered that distribution of the stickers should halt pending the resolution of a court case. However, Gazeta's editor dismissed the ruling saying it was "fake news" and censorship, and that the paper would continue distributing the sticker. Gazeta continued with the distribution of the stickers, but modified the decal to read "LGBT Ideology-Free Zone".

In August 2019, LGBT community members stated that they feel unsafe in Poland. The All Out organization launched a campaign to counter the attacks. Some 10,000 people signed a petition shortly after the campaign launch.

During the coronavirus pandemic in April 2020, several LGBT activists began handing out rainbow facemasks in Gdańsk, Gdynia and Sopot, as a direct protest of the "LGBT-free zones".

In July 2020, the town council of Nieuwegein, a Dutch city south of Utrecht, voted to end its friendship with Puławy in eastern Poland, citing "gay free zones" as the reason.

Since July 2020, the European Union has started denying funds to municipalities that adopted "LGBT-free" declarations.

In September 2020, ambassadors from 50 countries stationed in Poland published an open letter "[paying] tribute to the hard work of LGBTI and other communities in Poland and around the world" and calling to "end discrimination in particular on the basis of sexual orientation or gender identity". Polish Prime Minister Mateusz Morawiecki rejected the call, saying that "tolerance belongs to Polish DNA... Nobody needs to teach us tolerance, because we are a nation that has learned such tolerance for centuries", while senior politician Joachim Brudzinski tweeted that "we are waiting with hope for the next letter, this time in defense of murdered Christians, imprisoned #ProLife activists, people dismissed from work and persecuted for quoting the Bible, [and] people subjected to euthanasia against their will."

According to a December 2020 report by the Council of Europe Commissioner for Human Rights, "Far from being merely words on paper, these declarations and charters directly impact the lives of LGBTI people in Poland."

== LGBT movement and activism ==
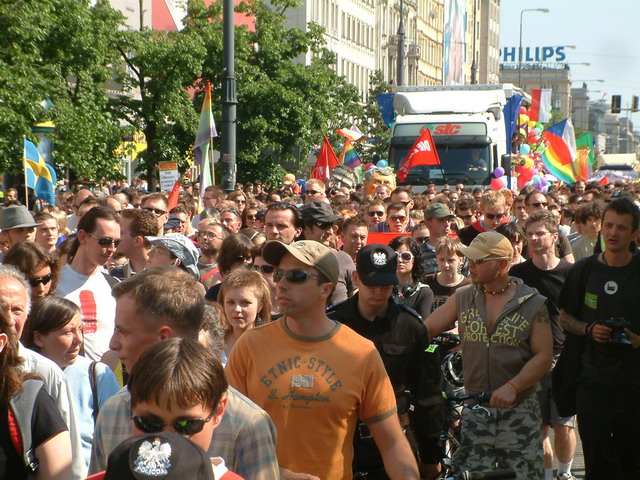
Parada Równości in 2007

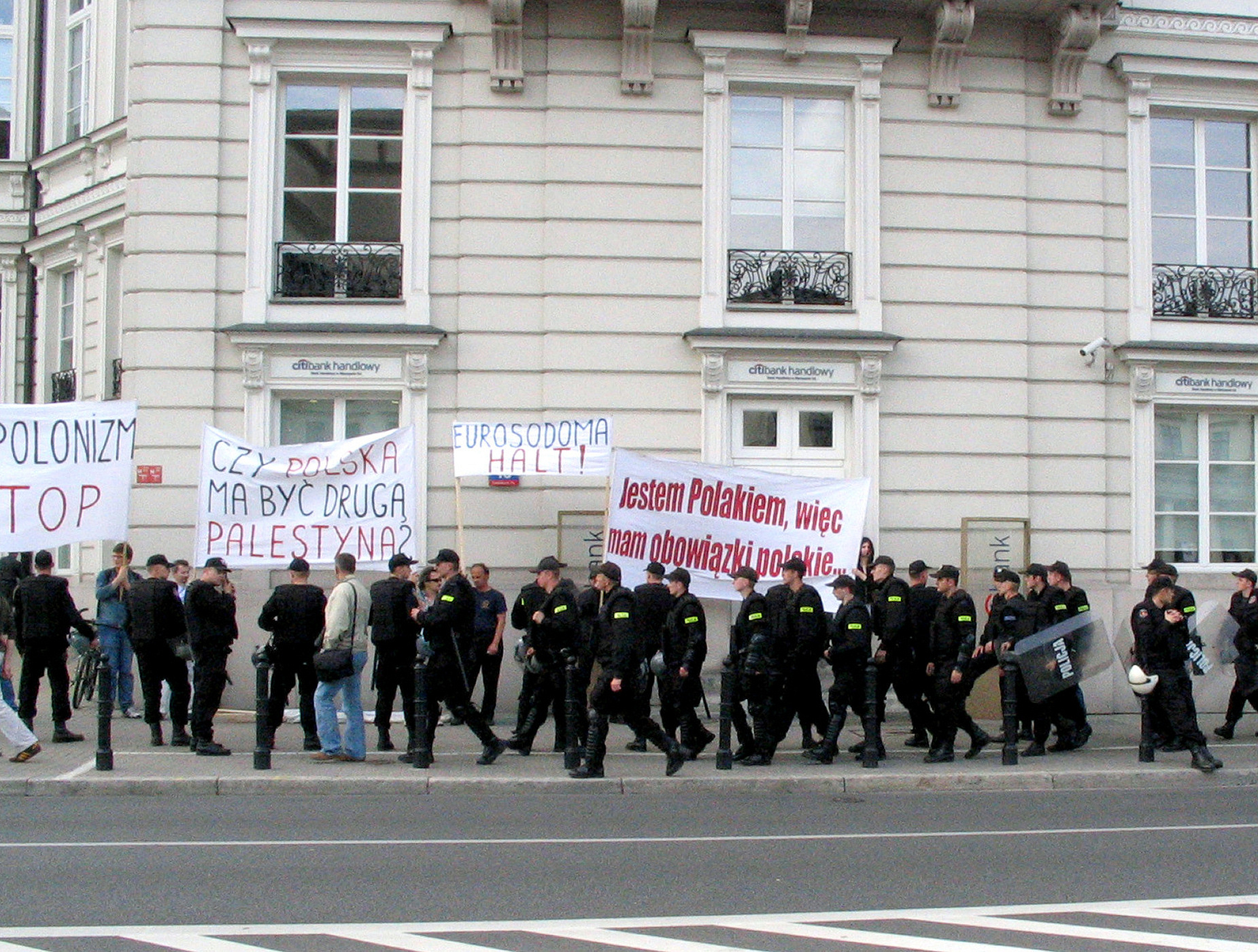
Anti-gay protesters at the Warsaw Parada Równości in 2006

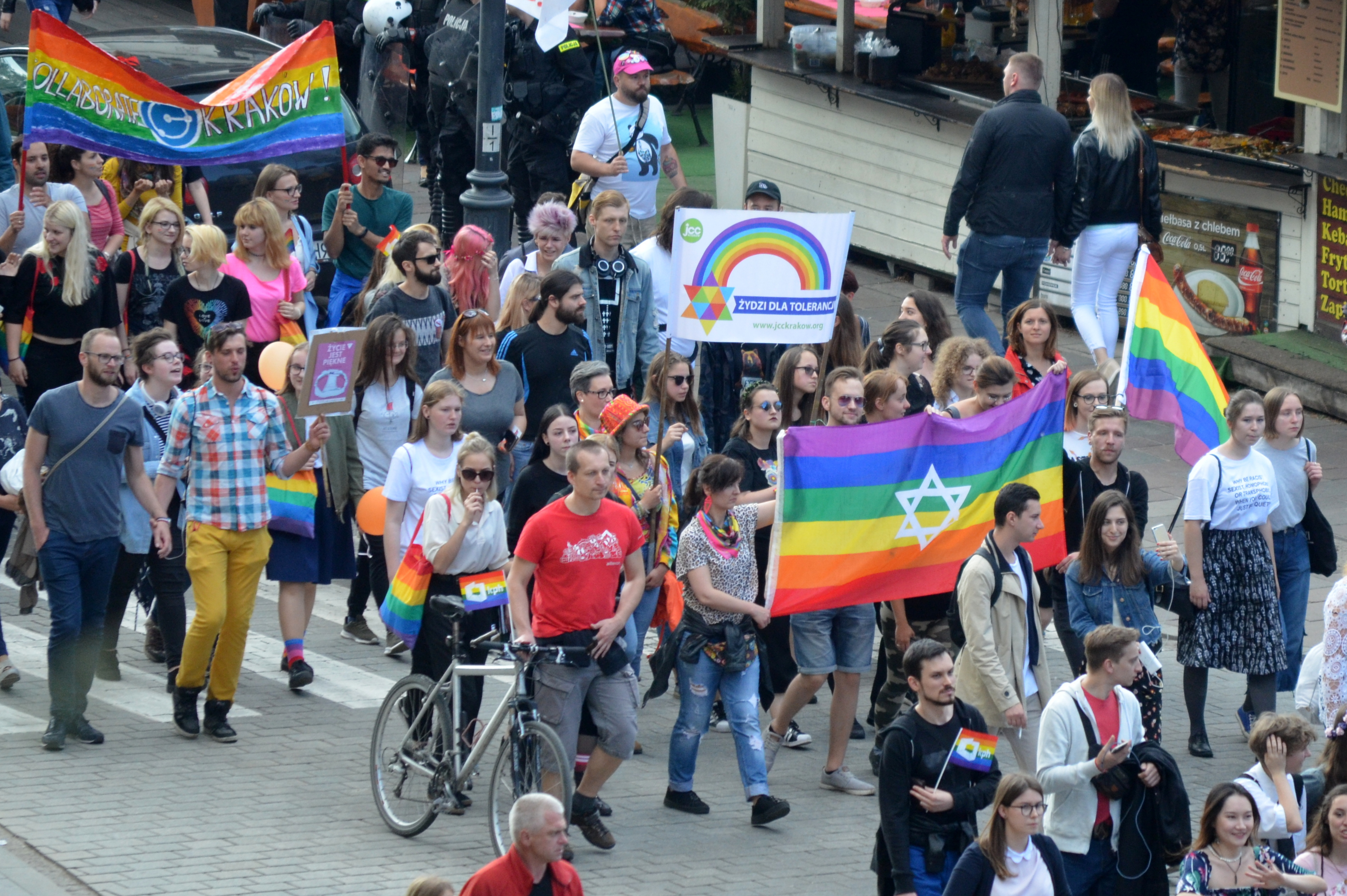
The 2018 Kraków Pride parade

=== Equality marches ===
The largest aspect of the LGBT movement in Poland is the equality parade held in Warsaw every year since 2001.

In 2004 and 2005, Warsaw officials denied permission to organize it, because of various reasons including the likelihood of counter-demonstrations, interference with religious or national holidays, and the lack of a permit. Despite this, about 2,500 people marched illegally on 11 June 2005. Ten people were arrested. The ban has been declared illegal by the Bączkowski v Poland ruling of the European Court of Human Rights in 2007.

The parade was condemned by the Mayor of Warsaw Lech Kaczyński, who said that allowing an official pride event in Warsaw would promote a "homosexual lifestyle".

The Parada Równości events have continued regularly since 2006, attracting crowds of less than 10,000 every year, until 2015 when the parade attracted 18 thousand attendees. Since then, attendance has increased dramatically, culminating in the 2018 parade which attracted 45,000 attendees. On 8 June 2019, around 50,000 people marched in the event. Mayor Rafał Trzaskowski participated in the event for the first time and said that he wanted Warsaw to remain "open" and "tolerant."

On 20 July 2019, a violent counter-protest took place during the first Equality March in Białystok. Police estimated that about 800 peaceful marchers were confronted by more than 4,000 counter-protesters, heavily outnumbering the attendees. Eyewitnesses, journalists, and human rights monitors documented that counter-protesters indiscriminately threw stones, bricks, firecrackers, flash bombs, rotten eggs, and bottles filled with urine at marchers, including children and teenagers, requiring heavy riot police intervention to prevent mass casualties.

In 2005, 33% of the Warsaw population were for the organisation of the Parada Równości. In 2008, that figure fell to 25%.

A 2010 opinion poll, conducted by PBS for Gazeta Wyborcza, showed that 45% of Warsaw residents supported the parade.

In recent years, the parade has attracted widespread support from corporations and regional governments. The main partner of the 2018 parade was the regional Government of the Masovian Voivodeship, of which Warsaw is a part.

=== Public opinion ===
In a 2014 survey, conducted by CBOS for Dr. Natalia Zimniewicz, 30% of Poles wanted a ban on public promotion of gay content, and 17.3% would not support that ban, but would want another form of limiting the freedom of promotion of such information.

52.5% thought that the current scale of promotion of gay content is excessive, 27.9% thought that pictures of gay parades or practices disgust them, 22.3% thought that the media blur the true image of homosexuality and 29.3% thought that gay content is not a private matter of the homosexual community, but affect children and other citizens.

== Summary table ==
	Yes/No	Notes
Same-sex sexual activity
Same-sex sexual activity legal	Yes	Since 1932
Equal age of consent (15)	Yes	Since 1932
Discrimination laws
Anti-discrimination laws in employment	Yes	Since 2003, but not consistently enforced
Anti-discrimination laws in the provision of goods and services	No	
Anti-discrimination laws in education	No	
Anti-discrimination laws in all other areas (incl. indirect discrimination, hate speech)	No	Proposed
Anti-discrimination laws concerning gender identity	No	Proposed
Hate crime laws concerning sexual orientation and gender identity	No	Proposed
Same-sex unions
Same-sex marriages	No / Yes (Same-sex marriages from EU member states recognised since 2026)	
Civil partnerships	No	Proposed.
Recognition of same-sex couples	No	.
Adoption and parenting
Adoption by individuals	Yes	Yes
Stepchild adoption by same-sex couples	No	
Joint adoption by same-sex couples	No	
Commercial surrogacy for gay male couples	Yes	Surrogacy completely unregulated
Access to IVF for lesbians	No	Available only for women in heterosexual relationships
Other
Conversion therapy banned	No	
Lesbians, gays and bisexuals allowed to serve openly in the military	Yes	
Right to change legal gender	Yes	Since 1995. Birth certificates are immutable under the law. Instead, an addendum is appended in the birth certificate with the sex change court order and legal name change.
MSMs allowed to donate blood	Yes	Since 2005

== See also ==
- Homofonia
- Human rights in Poland
- LGBTQ history in Poland
- LGBTQ rights in Europe
- LGBTQ rights in the European Union
- List of LGBTQ politicians in Poland
