= Navalnyy v. Russia =

Human rights law case

Navalnyy v Russia
- Court: European Court of Human Rights
- Citation: [2018] ECHR 1062, (2018) 29580/12, (2019) 68 EHRR 25

Keywords
- Freedom of association, liberty and the right to a fair trial

Navalnyy v Russia [2018] ECHR 1062 is a human rights law case, concerning freedom of association, liberty and the right to a fair trial. It centered around Alexei Navalny, a Russian opposition activist.

== Facts ==
Alexei Navalny, an activist against corruption and a blogger, was arrested seven times between 2012 and 2014 for a rally, three 'walkabout' gatherings, two demonstrations, and a courthouse gathering, and held liable for administrative offences, or disobeying police orders. The Code of Administrative Offences art 20(2) made it an offence to breach procedures for conduct of public gatherings. He was fined and got short custodial sentences. He argued this breached the European Convention on Human Rights articles 5, 6, 11 and 18. He argued the Russian authorities had an ulterior purpose of stopping his political engagement and influence.

== Judgment ==
The European Court of Human Rights held there were breaches of articles 5, 6 and 11. The Russian courts acted unfairly by basing their judgments only on police accounts, and in all seven cases there was a breach of the right to assembly. Article 18 was breached because there was a pattern of arrest, on progressively more implausible grounds. Response was increasingly severe. It was aimed to suppress political pluralism, which formed part of 'effective political democracy' governed by 'the rule of law'.

== See also ==
- International human rights law
- UK constitutional law
