= Trans-Fuzja =

Polish LGBT organization

The organization's logo

Fundacja Trans-Fuzja is a Polish LGBT rights organization. It was founded in February 2008 and acquired the status of a public interest organisation (OPP), working to better the wellbeing of transgender people in Poland.

== Fields of activity ==
Trans-Fuzja works to improve the living conditions of transgender people in Poland and support them and their relatives through the transition process. The foundation offers psychological support and provides legal advice for judicial gender reassignment and other legal aspects of transition. It also conducts trainings and workshops for schools and companies that want to educate their employees on inclusivity and encourages local establishments to be vocal about being safe places for transgender people.

Trans-Fuzja promotes education in the field of gender studies, funding publications and creating pamphlets that help people navigate the early stages of their transitions. In 2014 Trans-Fuzja conducted a study on the experiences of transgender people in Poland in accessing health care services, and in 2015 a study of the situation of transitioning youth at schools.

In 2009 Trans-Fuzja and the Campaign Against Homophobia organised a Festival of Rainbow Families to show the diversity of families and relationships that exist in Poland.

It also organises campaigns aimed at counteracting transphobia and abolishing discriminatory laws. In 2012, Trans-Fuzja, together with member of parliament Anna Grodzka, prepared a draft of a Gender Recognition act, which was passed in Sejm on the 10th of September 2015. However, the act was vetoed by President Andrzej Duda on 2 October 2015 and ultimately did not come into being.

In November 2013, the Office of the Polish Ombudsman hosted a conference titled "European standards and good practices in gender reassignment", co-organised by Trans-Fuzja, the RPO Adam Bodnar and the Council of Europe.

== Chairpersons ==
Terms in office of the management last three years, and, as chairpersons, there have been:

- Anna Grodzka – from July 2008 till December 2011
- Lalka Podobińska – from December 2011 till June 2014
- Wiktor Dynarski – from June 2014 till January 2017
- Edyta Baker – from January 2017 till March 2021
- Emilia Wiśniewska – from March 2021 till March 2023
- Grzegorz Żak – from March 2023

== See also ==
- Transgender rights movement
