= Vogt v. Germany =

Vogt v. Germany (1996) 21 EHRR 205, (17851/91) was a case decided by the European Court of Human Rights (ECHR) in 1995. The case concerned a Mrs. Vogt who was suspended from her teaching job at a public secondary school because of her past membership in the German Communist Party. The ECHR ruled that this application of Berufsverbot violated provisions in the European Convention on Human Rights relating to freedom of expression and freedom of association.

== Facts ==
Mrs. D. Vogt joined the German Communist Party in 1972 (Para. 18). In 1977, she became a language teacher at a public secondary school and, correspondingly, a probationary civil servant. In 1979, she was appointed a permanent public servant (Para. 9). In 1986, Mrs. Vogt was suspended based on Berufsverbot (Para. 16). The German courts considered her dismissal to be legal, considering GCP's aims anti-constitutional and active membership in GCP incompatible with a civil servant's duty of loyalty (Para. 18–23).

In 1990, Lower Saxony cancelled its decree on employment of extremists in the civil service (Para. 32.), and, in 1991, Mrs. Vogt was reinstated (Para. 24). In 1991, an application was lodged before the European Commission of Human Rights (Para. 1.). In 1992, it was declared admissible. In 1993, the Commission held in its report, by 13 votes to 1, that Articles 10 (freedom of expression) and 11 (freedom of association) of the European Convention on Human Rights were violated, but the complaints under Article 14 (ban of discrimination in enjoying Convention rights) were not necessary to examine (Para. 95–97 of the Report).

== Judgment ==
The Grand Chamber of the ECtHR held in 1995, by 10 votes to 9, that Articles 10 and 11 of the ECHR were violated, considering the dismissal disproportionate to the legitimate aim pursued (Para. 68). The court underlined that

Mrs Vogt was a teacher of German and French in a secondary school, a post which did not intrinsically involve any security risks. [...] [T]here is no evidence that Mrs Vogt herself, even outside her work at school, actually made anti-constitutional statements or personally adopted an anti-constitutional stance. [...] [T]he DKP had not been banned by the Federal Constitutional Court and [...], consequently, the applicant's activities on its behalf were entirely lawful.

— Vogt v. Germany, Grand Chamber Judgment, Para. 60

It also held unanimously that it was not necessary to examine the case under Article 14 of the convention taken in conjunction with Article 10, since this complaint was not raised by Mrs Vogt at court.

Judges Bernhardt, Gölcüklü, Matscher, Loizou, Mifsud Bonnici, Gotchev, Jungwiert, Kūris and Jambrek filed dissenting opinions, finding no violation in the case. Judge Mifsud Bonnici also annexed a statement to the judgment.

The Court reserved the question of awarding just satisfaction and struck the case out of the list in 1996, after a settlement between the applicant and the government.

== See also ==
- European labour law
- German labour law
