= Lutsenko =

Lutsenko (Ukrainian: Луценко) is a Ukrainian surname. It derives from the personal name Luts' (Ukrainian: Луць; diminutive form of Luka). The surname, Lutsenko, was created by adding the Ukrainian patronimic suffix, -enko, meaning someone of Luts, usually the son of Luts. Notable people with the surname include:

- Alexey Lutsenko, Kazakhstani road race cyclist
- Ihor Lutsenko (politician), Ukrainian politician and journalist
- Taras Lutsenko, Ukrainian football goalkeeper
- Yevgeni Lutsenko (born 1987), Russian football striker
- Yevhen Lutsenko (born 1980), Ukrainian football midfielder
- Yuriy Lutsenko (born 1964), Ukrainian politician and statesman
