= Anna Grodzka =

Polish politician (born 1954)

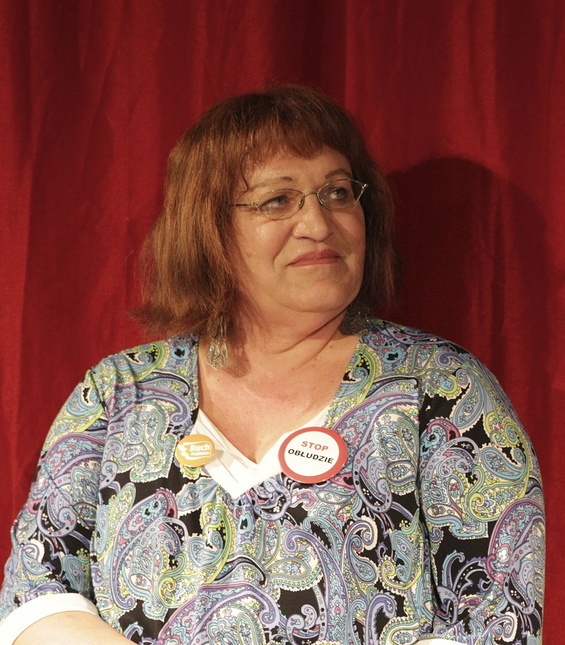
- Grodzka in 2011

Member of the Sejm
- In office November 2011 – 12 November 2015
- Constituency: 13 – Kraków

Personal details
- Born: 16 March 1954 (age 72) Otwock, Poland
- Party: Democratic Left Alliance (1998–2011); Your Movement (2011–2014); The Greens (2014–2016); Left Together (2017–2019); Polish Socialist Party (2019–2021)
- Children: 1
- Website: annagrodzka.info

Anna Grodzka (born 16 March 1954) is a Polish politician. A trans woman, she was elected to the Sejm in the 2011 Polish parliamentary elections as a candidate for the left-liberal Palikot's Movement, and was the first openly transgender Member of Parliament in Poland, and the third openly transgender member of a national parliament worldwide, after Georgina Beyer (in office 1999–2005) in New Zealand and Vladimir Luxuria (2006–2008) in Italy. She was believed to be the only remaining transgender member of parliament until Nikki Sinclaire (in office 2009–2015) outed herself in November 2013.

In June 2014, Grodzka joined Poland's Green Party but left a year later. In 2019, she became a member of PPS, which she also left soon after criticizing the party's chairman.

== Biography ==
Grodzka was born in 1954 at Otwock, near Warsaw. Before openly transitioning, she was married to a woman named Grażyna with whom she had a son. She transitioned in 2009 after divorcing in 2007.

Grodzka was a member of the Polish United Workers' Party at Warsaw University and a political instructor in the Polish Union of Students. Later on she was an entrepreneur and worked in publishing, print industry, and filmmaking.

In 2008, she co-founded and became the first president of the Trans-Fuzja Foundation, which works to improve the living conditions of transgender people in Poland and support them and their relatives through the transition process. The foundation offers psychological support and legal advice for judicial gender reassignment and other legal aspects of transition.
