= Article 11 of the European Convention on Human Rights =

Freedom of assembly and association

Article 11 of the European Convention on Human Rights (ECHR) protects the right to freedom of peaceful assembly and to freedom of association with others, including the right to form and join trade unions. It is regarded by the European Court of Human Rights (ECtHR) as a fundamental right and one of the foundations of a democratic society. The right is not absolute: Article 11(2) permits restrictions that are prescribed by law, pursue a legitimate aim, and are necessary in a democratic society.

== Text ==
Article 11 – Freedom of assembly and association

1. Everyone has the right to freedom of peaceful assembly and to freedom of association with others, including the right to form and to join trade unions for the protection of his interests.
2. No restrictions shall be placed on the exercise of these rights other than such as are prescribed by law and are necessary in a democratic society in the interests of national security or public safety, for the prevention of disorder or crime, for the protection of health or morals or for the protection of the rights and freedoms of others. This article shall not prevent the imposition of lawful restrictions on the exercise of these rights by members of the armed forces, of the police or of the administration of the State.

== Peaceful assembly ==
The right to freedom of assembly is only protected by Article 11 if the assembly is peaceful. Organisers or participants of assemblies who have violent intentions, incite violence, or otherwise reject the foundations of a democratic society are excluded. Since freedom of peaceful assembly is a fundamental right and a foundation of democratic society, the ECtHR adopts a wide interpretation.

Unlawful or disruptive yet nonetheless peaceful assemblies do not automatically lose protection from Article 11. Disruption intentionally planned by assembly leaders cannot enjoy the same protection.

In Kudrevičius and Others v Lithuania (2015), a blockade of three major highways with tractors, as part of a wider agricultural protest, led to the criminal conviction of five Lithuanian nationals. The Grand Chamber held that obstructing traffic as part of a demonstration is, by itself, peaceful conduct, but not at the core of the freedom protected by Article 11.

Peaceful participants do not lose their right to assembly based on another or a group of others inciting violence. In Ezelin v France (1991), the ECtHR held that the freedom to take part in a peaceful assembly is of such importance that it cannot be restricted in any way, so long as the person concerned does not commit any reprehensible act on that occasion, even if others at the demonstration engage in violence.

The ECtHR interprets Article 11 in light of Article 10, which protects the right to freedom of expression, since one objective of freedom of assembly and association is the protection of opinions and the freedom to express them.

== Positive obligation ==
Article 11 requires states to take positive measures to secure the effective enjoyment of the right to assemble peacefully, rather than merely refraining from unreasonable interference. Whether a state has discharged its positive obligations is assessed by the same standard as its negative ones: the ECtHR considers whether a fair balance has been struck between the public interest and the individual's right.

In Bączkowski and Others v Poland (2007), the ECtHR stressed that the positive obligation to facilitate peaceful assembly is particularly important for those holding unpopular views or belonging to minorities, as they are more vulnerable to victimisation.

States must also take appropriate measures to ensure the peaceful conduct of lawful demonstrations and the safety of all involved. This includes preventive security measures, such as the presence of first-aid services on the site of demonstrations. The duty to communicate with assembly leaders is equally essential.

=== Counter-demonstrations ===
A central aspect of the positive obligation is the state's duty to protect demonstrators from violent disruption by counter-demonstration.

Plattform "Ärzte für das Leben" v Austria (1988) established that the right to counter-demonstrate does not extend to inhibiting the exercise of the right to demonstrate, and assemblies must be able to exercise their right without fear of physical violence from their opponents, as this would deter the open expression of opinions on controversial matters of importance. States must therefore take reasonable and appropriate measures to enable lawful demonstrations to proceed peacefully.

Both demonstrations and counter-demonstrations are protected by Article 11, so states bear a positive obligation to both groups simultaneously. In cases with a serious threat of violent counter-demonstration, the state must find the least restrictive means enabling both assemblies to take place.

The obligation is one as to measures taken, rather than results achieved, and states have a wide discretion to choose the means used to fulfil this duty and are not expected to guarantee peaceful conduct of assemblies absolutely.

== Restrictions ==
The right to freedom of assembly and association is not absolute. Article 11(2) outlines conditions in which restrictions on the exercise of the right are justified: the restriction must be prescribed by law, pursue a legitimate aim, and be necessary in a democratic society.

=== Prescribed by law ===
Restrictions must have a basis in domestic law, that law must be accessible to those affected and its effects must be foreseeable. A norm cannot be regarded as law unless it is formulated with sufficient precision to enable a person to reasonably foresee the consequences which a given action may entail.

In Navalnyy v Russia (2018), the Grand Chamber of the ECtHR recognised that the law must indicate with sufficient clarity the scope of any discretion conferred on the executive and the manner of its exercise, so as to afford adequate protection against arbitrary interference with fundamental rights.

=== Legitimate aim ===
Restrictions must pursue one of the aims listed in Article 11(2): the interests of national security or public safety, the prevention of disorder or crime, the protection of health or morals, or the protection of the rights and freedoms of others. These exceptions are interpreted narrowly.

The ECtHR guidance on Article 11 identifies prevention of disorder and the protection of the rights of others as the most commonly cited permissible grounds for restriction. These grounds will be rejected if the cited aim is clearly irrelevant in the specific circumstances.

=== Necessary in a democratic society ===
A restriction must answer a "pressing social need" and be proportionate to the legitimate aim pursued. States must give relevant and sufficient reasons for interference, and the authorities must have applied standards that conform to the principles of the Convention. The ECtHR conducts a proportionality analysis, weighing the requirement of the aims listed in Article 11(2) against the free expression of opinions by persons assembled in public places.

During this assessment, states enjoy a margin of appreciation of varied scope, depending on the specific circumstances. Public events related to political life must enjoy strong protection, so the ECtHR applies the most serious scrutiny to restrictions on the basis of an assembly's content, such as suppressing the expression of perceivably objectionable views. A government must not have the power to ban a demonstration because it considers the demonstrators’ message to be wrong. Conversely, where demonstrators intentionally cause disruption to ordinary life, exceeding that which is inevitable in the circumstances, the ECtHR grants states a wider margin of appreciation in assessing the necessity of the restrictive measures.

In Kudrevičius, the Grand Chamber held that the obstruction of three major highways constituted reprehensible conduct justifying criminal penalties, although it also examined the conduct of the authorities and the precise nature of the penalties imposed to ensure proportionality with the legitimate aims of preventing disorder and protecting the rights and freedoms of others.

== Enforcement ==
States may require prior notification or authorisation of public assemblies provided the purpose of such procedures is to allow authorities to take reasonable measures to guarantee the smooth conduct of the event. The failure to comply with domestic legal requirements does not automatically justify dispersal or the imposition of sanctions, nor does it mean the assembly is not protected by Article 11. The ECtHR has held that where irregular demonstrators do not engage in acts of violence, authorities must show a certain degree of tolerance towards peaceful gatherings so that their freedom of assembly is not deprived of all substance.

The ECtHR has consistently held that enforcement measures such as arrests, dispersal, and subsequent penalties may have a chilling effect, discouraging both the individuals concerned and others from participating in similar assemblies in the future. The chilling effect of such measures has been recognised as a significant factor in the proportionality assessment, particularly where the measures target well-known public figures or attract wide media coverage.

In assessing the proportionality of any response to an unlawful assembly, the nature and severity of the sanctions imposed are relevant factors. A peaceful demonstration should not, in principle, be rendered subject to the threat of a criminal sanction, and prison sentences for participation in peaceful assemblies require particular justification.

In Ziliberberg v Moldova (2004), the ECtHR rejected a complaint concerning a modest administrative fine of approximately €3 for participation in an unauthorised but peaceful student demonstration because the penalty was proportional to the aim of preventing the disorder. Conversely, in Navalnyy, the Grand Chamber found that the repeated arrest, detention, and conviction of the applicant for participation in peaceful gatherings disclosed a persistent failure by the authorities to show tolerance towards unauthorised but peaceful assemblies.

== Case law ==
- Communist Party of Germany v. the Federal Republic of Germany (1957) – proscription of the Communist Party upheld as Article 17 prohibits using Convention rights to seek the abolition or restriction of the rights of others
- Plattform "Ärzte für das Leben" v. Austria (1988) – neither police failure to ensure counter-protesters did not infiltrate and disrupt a protest, nor dispersal of protesters in order to allow another group to exercise its religion, breached article 11
- Vogt v Germany (1995) – Berufsverbot on grounds of membership in a lawful party, applied to someone who was not shown to be a threat to constitutional order, was found to be a breach of Articles 10 and 11
- Wilson and Palmer v United Kingdom [2002] ECHR 552 – lawfulness in UK law of using financial incentives to induce employees to surrender union rights was a breach of Article 11
- Yazar, Karatas, Aksoy and Hep v Turkey (2002) 36 EHRR 59 – the peaceful and democratic aims and methods of the People's Labour Party, which advocated increased political rights for Kurds, did not justify its dissolution as necessary in a democratic society, which was therefore a breach of Article 11
- Church of Scientology Moscow v Russia (2007) – rejection of registration in bad faith, with the consequent restriction of its lawful activities despite not being dissolved, was a breach of Articles 9 and 11
- ASLEF v United Kingdom (2007) – UK law prohibiting a trade union from expelling a member belonging to a political party with opinions that contradicted the purpose of the union was a breach of its freedom of association under Article 11
- Bączkowski v Poland (2007) – discriminatory ban on an LGBT pride parade was a breach of Articles 11, 13 and 14
- Demir and Baykara v Turkey [2008] ECHR 1345 – domestic courts' quashing of a collective bargaining agreement (despite recognising the right to join a union) was a breach of Article 11 as freedom of association implies a right to collective bargaining

== See also ==
- European Convention on Human Rights
- European labour law
- UK labour law
- German labour law
