= Tricity Equality March =

Equality march held annually in Gdańsk

Tricity Equality March Trójmiejski Marsz Równości
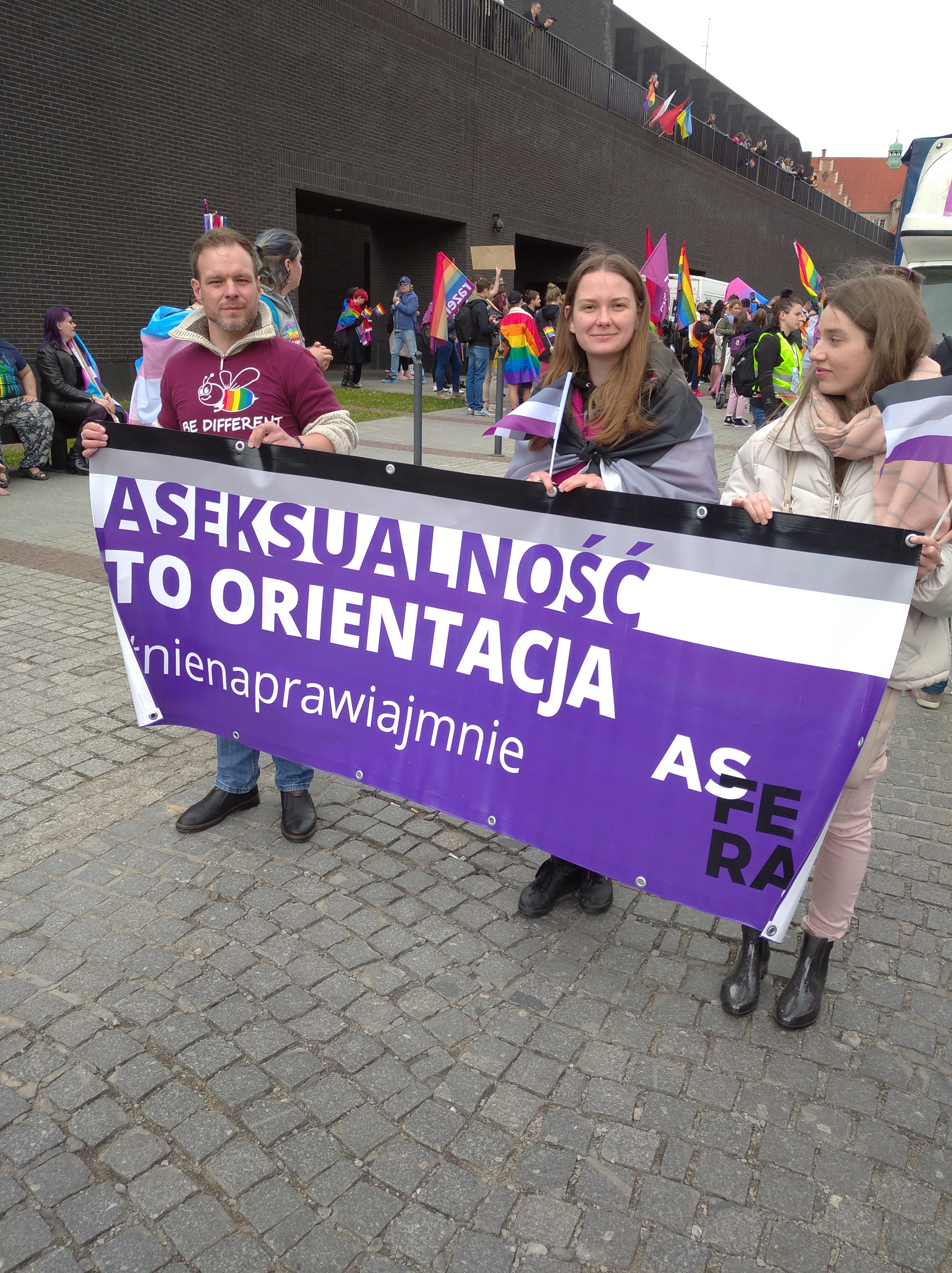
- Asexual participants of the 2022 Equality March
- Genre: Equality march
- Frequency: Annual
- Location: Gdańsk
- Country: Poland
- Years active: 11
- Inaugurated: May 30, 2015
- Most recent: 7 June 2025
- Attendance: 7,500 (2024)
- Website: tolerado.org/marsze/

The Tricity Equality March (Polish: Trójmiejski Marsz Równości) is an annual equality march—equality marches being the Polish counterpart to pride parades—taking place in Gdańsk since 2015. It is organized by the Tolerado Association for LGBT People and, in 2017, became the first such march in Poland to be endorsed by government of the city it was in.

== History ==
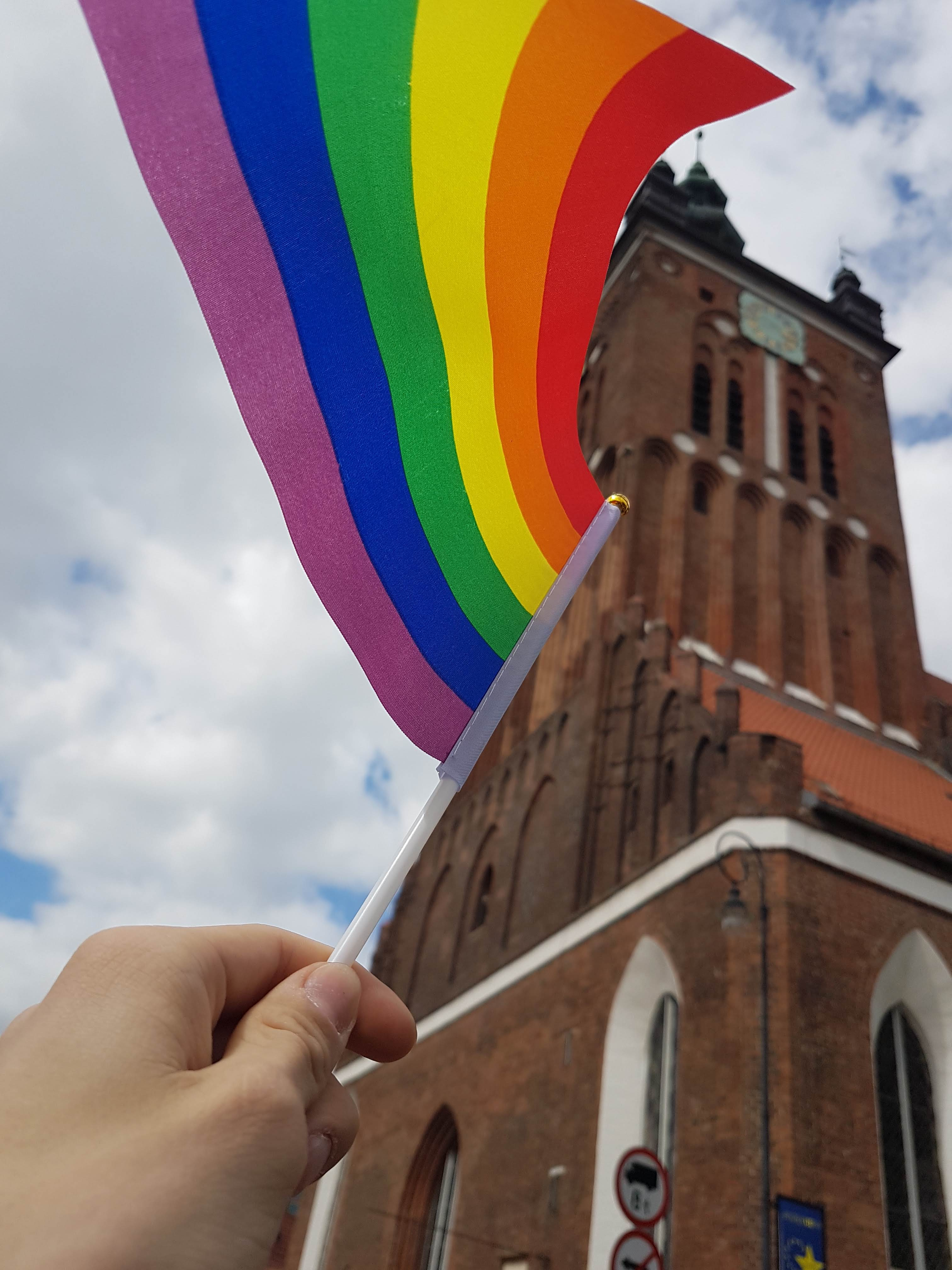
A photo from the 2019 march

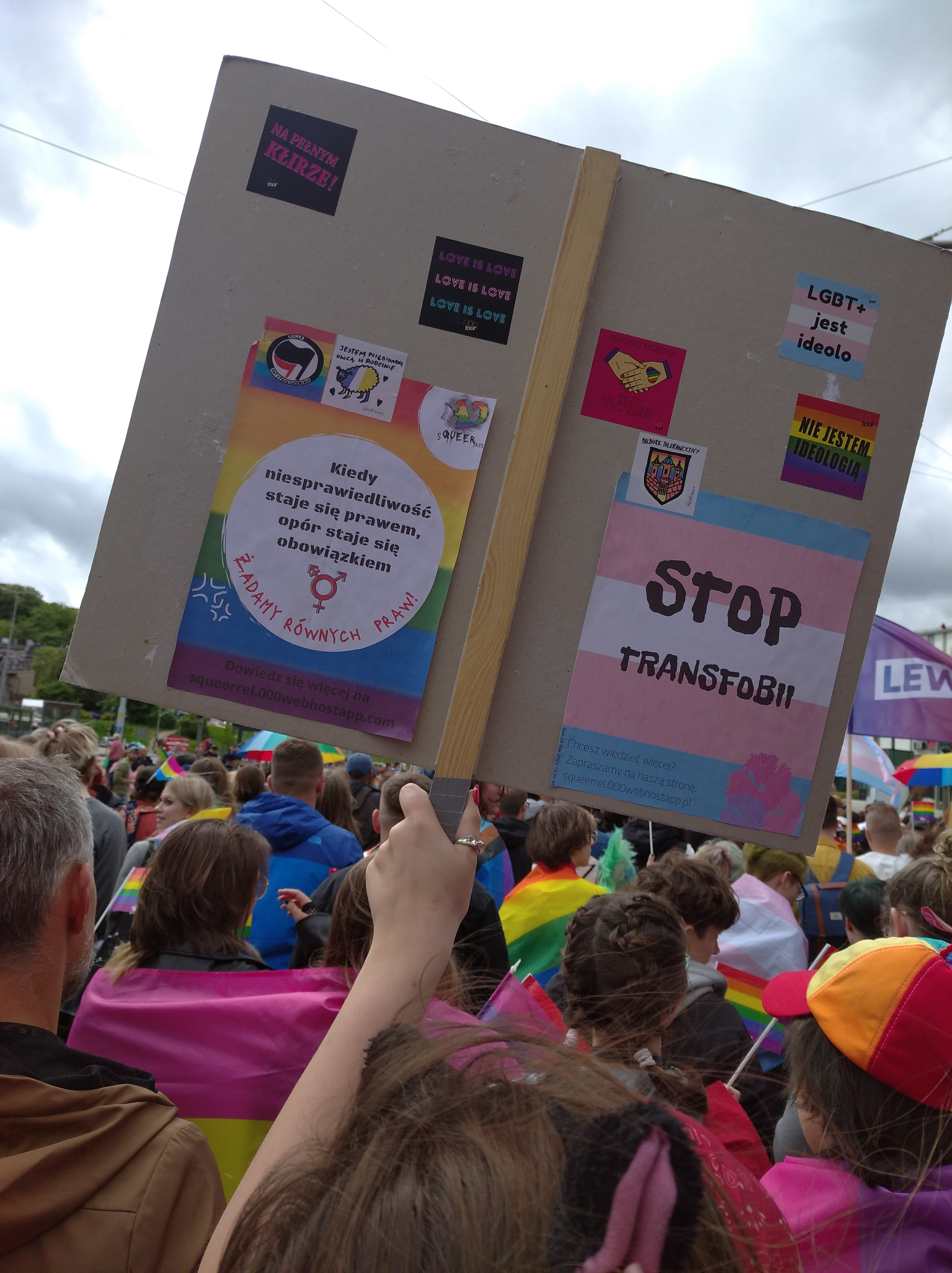
An anti-transphobia sign from the 2022 march

=== First march (2015) ===
The first Tricity Equality March occurred in 2015, as part of a broader event, the Tricity Days of Equality (Polish: Trójmiejskie Dni Równości). Its slogan was "We are a family!" (Polish: Jesteśmy rodziną!) and its attendance surprised the organizers of the march, with between 1,000 and 1,500 people taking part. Attendants included Wanda Nowicka, the Deputy Marshal of the Sejm; Robert Biedroń, the mayor of Słupsk; and Staffan Herrström, the ambassador of Sweden to Poland.

=== Second march (2016) ===
The 2016 march had the same slogan as the 2015 march; between 800 and 2,000 people participated. The route of the march was changed after nationalist counter-protesters blocked the route; the nationalists later clashed with police multiple times, resulting in five arrests.

=== Third march (2017) ===
In 2017, between 2,000 and 5,000 people took part in the march. It was formally opened by the mayor of Gdańsk, Paweł Adamowicz. Its slogan was "Love! Not war" (Polish: Miłość! Nie wojna), referencing the Constitutional Tribunal crisis. Participants included Ewa Lieder, a Sejm member belonging to the .Nowoczesna party, and Civic Platform Sejm member Agnieszka Pomaska.

=== Fourth march (2018) ===
In 2018, around 7,000 people took part in the march. The honorary patron was Adamowicz, who once again partook in the march's opening. The city government also announced the Model for Equal Treatment (Polish: Model na Rzecz Równego Traktowania), a programme aimed at combating discrimination of all varieties, but especially sexual orientation discrimination.

=== Fifth march (2019) ===
According to the organizers of the 2019 march, it had more participants than that of 2018 and had upwards of 10,000 people participating in it. Its patrons included the mayors of both Gdańsk and Sopot. It was described by news media as "peaceful", "happy", and "safe". Those participating in the march also paid homage to Adamowicz, who had been assassinated in January of that year, and its main slogan was one of his quotes: "Love can only unite us" (Polish: Miłość może nas tylko łączyć). The march was opened by the new mayor, Aleksandra Dulkiewicz. Participants included Magdalena Adamowicz, Paweł's widow, as well as Joanna Senyszyn, a Sejm member and candidate in the 2025 presidential election. It ended with a picnic near the Gdańsk Shipyard.

=== 2020 march (cancelled) ===
Because of the COVID-19 pandemic in Poland, the next event, originally scheduled for 30 May 2020, was cancelled. In its stead, an online choir sang the words "Love unites us" (Polish: Miłość nas łączy) to the tune of "We Are the Champions" by Queen.

=== Sixth march (2021) ===
In 2021, the march took place again, though it was delayed to 21 August instead of its usual May date. It had the slogan "We only have one life" (Polish: Mamy tylko jedno życie). Once again, the mayors of Sopot and Gdańsk endorsed the march, with Dulkiewicz opening it. Gazeta Wyborcza stated that "a few thousand" people attended the march.

=== Seventh march (2022) ===
7,500 people participated in the seventh march, which took place on 28 May 2022 under the slogan "We Have The Power" (Polish: Mamy Tę Moc). Alongside the mayors of Gdańsk and Sopot, Pomeranian voivodeship marshal Mieczysław Struk was a patron of the event. Among others, the ambassadors to Poland from Ireland and Denmark participated.

=== Eighth march (2023) ===
The 2023 march took place on 27 May with the slogan "Diversity is freedom" (Polish: Różnorodność jest wolnością). Approximately 10,000 people participated. Its patrons were the same as those in 2022. It was opened by Dulkiewicz, with speeches given by deputy mayor of Sopot Magdalena Czarzyńska-Jachim and MEP Magdalena Adamowicz. Those marching included Piotr Borawski, Piotr Grzelak, and Monika Chabior, who were the three deputy mayors of Gdańsk, as well as Sejm members Barbara Nowacka and Agnieszka Pomaska, the latter of whom had also participated in the 2017 march.

=== Ninth march (2024) ===
In 2024, 7,500 people took part in the Equality March. Its slogan was: "Open the door for... love, equality, diversity – for us!" (Polish: Otwórz drzwi na... miłość, równość, różnorodność, - na nas!). It occurred under the patronage of Pomeranian voivode Beata Rutkiewicz and Minister for Equality Katarzyna Kotula. All three city mayors of the Tricity took part in the march for the first time: mayor of Gdańsk Aleksandra Dulkiewicz, mayor of Sopot Magdalena Czarzyńska-Jachim, and mayor of Gdynia Aleksandra Kosiorek.

=== Tenth march (2025) ===
The tenth and most recent Tricity Equality March took place on 7 June 2025. Its slogan was "Equality is here and now" (Polish: Równość jest tu i teraz). Gazeta Wyborcza wrote that "thousands" participated in that year's rendition of the event. Magda Magott, the chairwoman of Tolerado, stated the march's purpose was to campaign against hate speech and for the rights of children of same-sex couples.

== See also ==
- Equality Parade (Warsaw)
- Kraków Equality March
- Szczecin Equality March
