= Rainbow flag (LGBTQ) =

Common symbol of the LGBTQ community

- The most popular version of the flag, with six stripes, first introduced in 1979
- LGBTQ Pride flag
- Use: Association with the LGBTQ community
- Adopted: June 25, 1978
- Design: Striped flag, typically six colors (from top to bottom): red, orange, yellow, green, blue, and violet.
- Designed by: Gilbert Baker

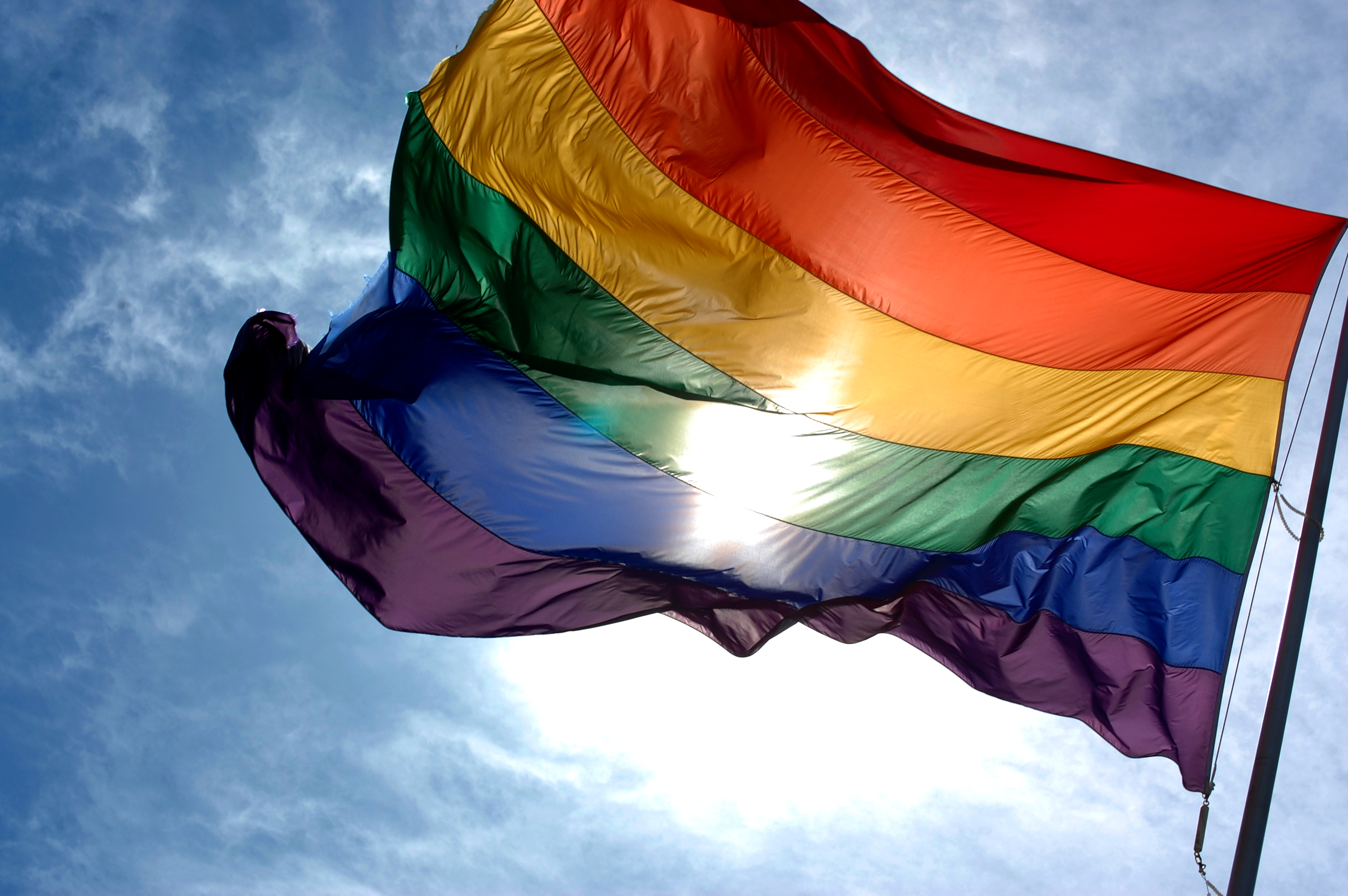
The rainbow flag is a symbol of lesbian, gay, bisexual, transgender, and queer (LGBTQ) pride and LGBTQ movements in use since the 1970s.

The rainbow flag or pride flag (formerly gay pride flag) is a symbol of LGBTQ pride and LGBTQ social movements, as well as a peace symbol. The colors reflect the diversity of the LGBTQ community and the spectrum of human sexuality and gender. Using a rainbow flag as a symbol of LGBTQ pride began in San Francisco, California, and subsequently became common at LGBTQ rights events worldwide.

Originally devised by the artists Gilbert Baker, Lynn Segerblom, James McNamara and other activists, the design underwent several revisions after its debut in 1978, and continues to inspire variations. Although Baker's original rainbow flag had eight colors, from 1979 to the present day the most common variant consists of six stripes: red, orange, yellow, green, blue, and violet. The flag is typically displayed horizontally, with the red stripe on top, as it would be in a natural rainbow.

LGBTQ people and allies currently use rainbow flags and many rainbow-themed items and color schemes as an outward symbol of their identity or support. There are derivations of the rainbow flag that are used to focus attention on specific causes or groups within the community (e.g. transgender people, fighting the AIDS epidemic, inclusion of LGBTQ people of color). In addition to the rainbow, many other flags and symbols are used to communicate specific identities within the LGBTQ community.

== History ==
=== Origin ===
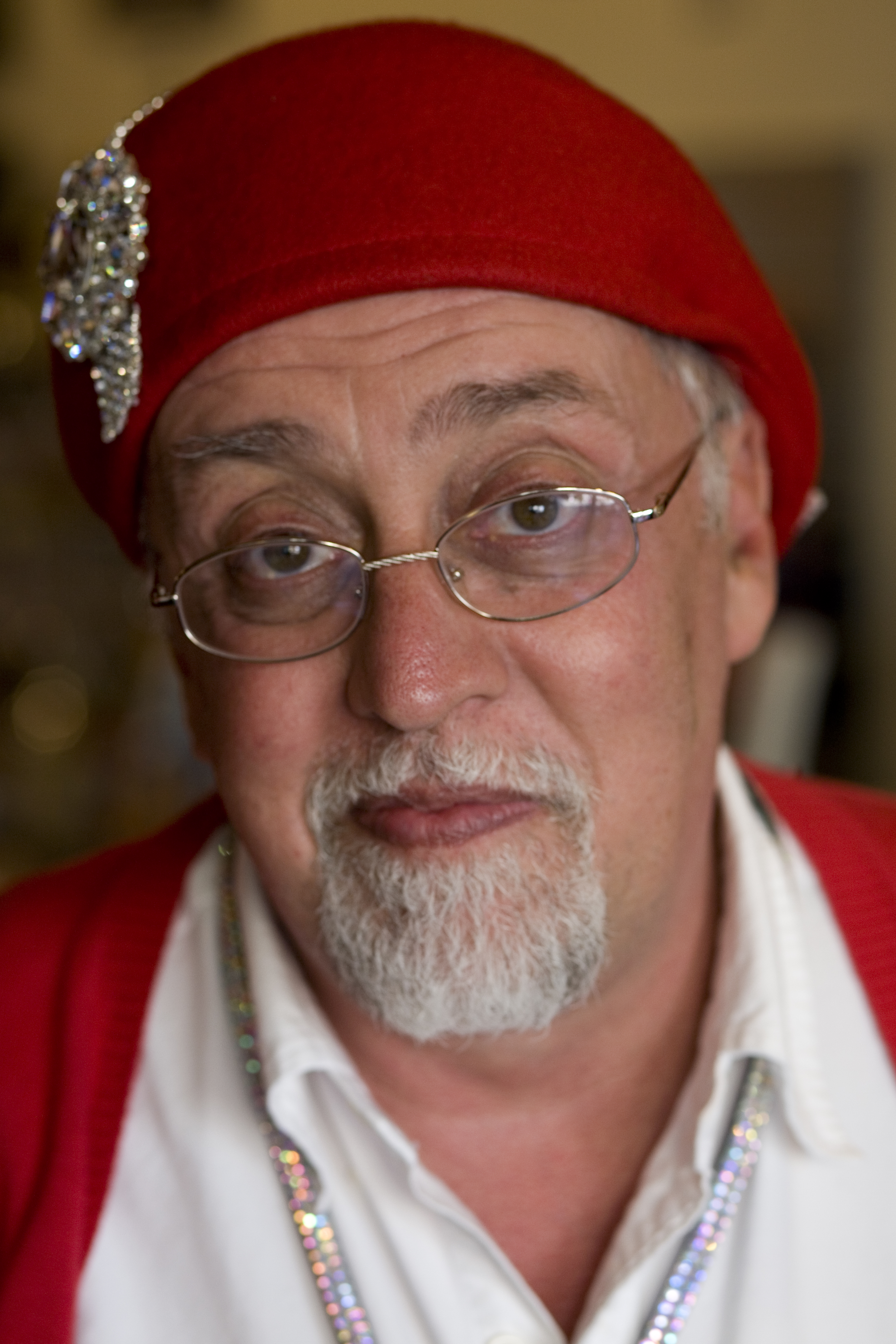
Gilbert Baker designed the rainbow flag in 1978

Gilbert Baker was an American artist and activist known for designing the rainbow flag. Born in 1951 in Parsons, Kansas, Baker served in the United States Army from 1970 to 1972. After his discharge, he learned to sew and became involved in the gay rights movement in San Francisco.

Influenced by his friend and gay rights activist, Harvey Milk, Baker adopted Milk's call for openness and truth among gay people. He saw the flag as a direct way to express presence and identity. At the urging of filmmaker Arthur J. Bressan Jr., Baker created the rainbow flag to serve as a symbol for the movement.

The first flags appeared on June 25, 1978, during the San Francisco Gay Freedom Day Parade celebration.

According to a profile published in the Bay Area Reporter in 1985, Baker "chose the rainbow motif because of its associations with the hippie movement of the Sixties but he notes that the use of the design dates all the way back to ancient Egypt". People have speculated that Baker was inspired by the Judy Garland song "Over the Rainbow" (Garland being among the first gay icons), but when asked, Baker said that it was "more about the Rolling Stones and their song 'She's a Rainbow'". Baker was likely influenced by the "Brotherhood Flag" (with five horizontal stripes to represent different races: red, white, brown, yellow, and black) popular among the world peace movement and hippie movement of the 1960s.

The first rainbow flags commissioned by the fledgling pride committee were produced by a team that included artist Lynn Segerblom. Segerblom was then known as Faerie Argyle Rainbow; according to her, she created the original dyeing process for the flags. Thirty volunteers hand-dyed and stitched the first two flags for the parade. The original flag design had eight stripes, with a specific meaning assigned to each of the colors:

Hot pink	Sex
Red	Life
Orange	Healing
Yellow	Sunlight
Green	Nature
Turquoise	Magic/Art
Indigo	Serenity
Violet	Spirit

The two flags originally created for the 1978 parade were believed lost for over four decades, until a remnant of one was discovered among Baker's belongings in 2020.

=== 1978 to 1979 ===
Original eight-stripe version designed by Baker in 1978

Seven-color version due to unavailability of pink fabric (1978–1979)

Six-color version popular since 1979, with turquoise and indigo replaced with blue

After the assassination of gay San Francisco City Supervisor Harvey Milk on November 27, 1978, demand for the rainbow flag greatly increased. In response, the San Francisco-based Paramount Flag Company began selling a version using stock rainbow fabric with seven stripes: red, orange, yellow, green, turquoise, blue, and violet. As Baker ramped up production of his version of the flag, he too dropped the hot pink stripe because fabric in that color was not readily available. The Paramount Flag Company also began selling a surplus stock of Rainbow Girls flags from its retail store on the southwest corner of Polk and Post, at which Gilbert Baker was an employee.

In 1979, the flag was modified again. Aiming to decorate the street lamps along the parade route with hundreds of rainbow banners, Baker decided to split the motif in two with an even number of stripes flanking each lamp pole. To achieve this effect, he dropped the turquoise stripe that had been used in the seven-stripe flag. The result was the six-stripe version of the flag that would become the standard for future production—red, orange, yellow, green, blue, and violet.

=== 1980s to 2000s ===
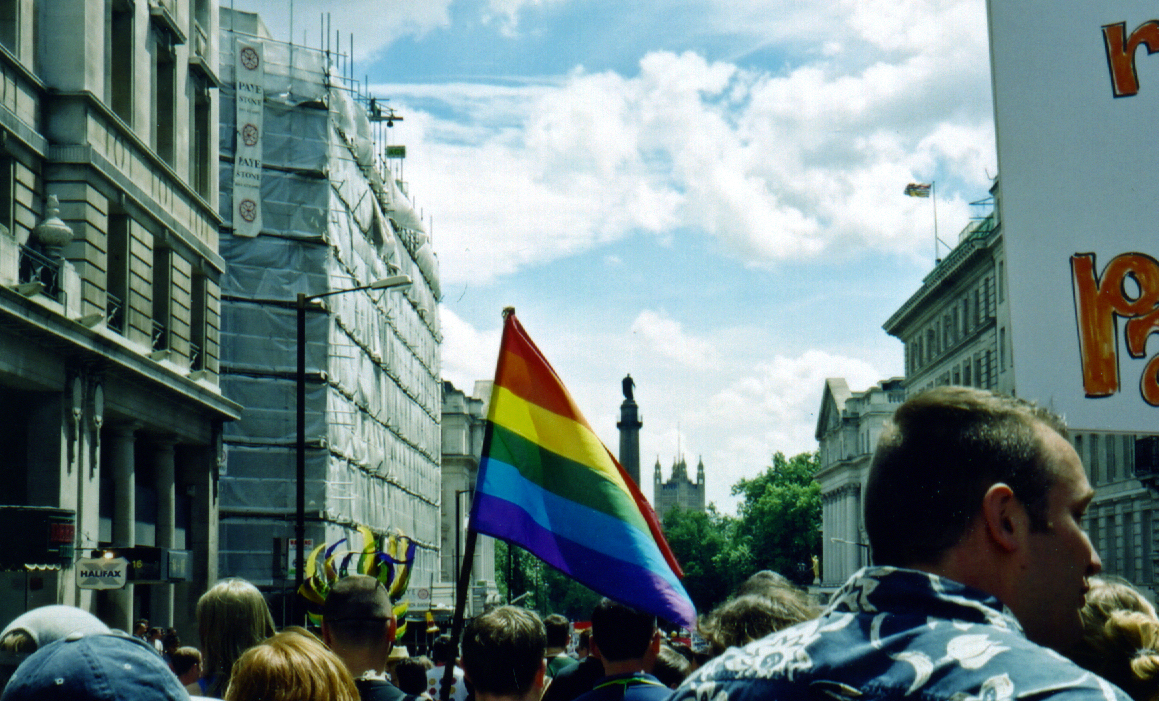
Rainbow flag at Pride London, 1999

In 1989, the rainbow flag came to further nationwide attention in the U.S. after John Stout sued his landlords and won when they attempted to prohibit him from displaying the flag from his West Hollywood, California, apartment balcony.

In 2000, the University of Hawaii at Manoa changed its sports teams' name from "Rainbow Warriors" to "Warriors" and redesigned its logo to eliminate a rainbow from it. Athletic director Hugh Yoshida initially said that the change was to distance the school's athletic program from homosexuality. When this drew criticism, Yoshida then said the change was merely to avoid brand confusion. The school then allowed each team to select its own name, leading to a mix including "Rainbow Warriors", "Warriors", "Rainbows" and "Rainbow Wahine". This decision was reversed in February 2013, by athletic director Ben Jay, dictating that all men's athletic teams be nicknamed "Warriors" and all women's teams "Rainbow Warriors". In May 2013, all teams were once again called "Rainbow Warriors" regardless of sex.

In 2004 several gay businesses in London were ordered by Westminster City Council to remove the rainbow flag from their premises, as its display required planning permission. When one shop applied for permission, the Planning sub-committee refused the application on the chair's casting vote (May 19, 2005), a decision condemned by gay councilors in Westminster and the then-Mayor of London, Ken Livingstone. In November the council announced a reversal of policy, stating that most shops and bars would be allowed to fly the rainbow flag without planning permission.

In June 2004 LGBTQ activists sailed to Australia's uninhabited Coral Sea Islands Territory and raised the rainbow flag, proclaiming the territory independent of Australia, calling it the Gay and Lesbian Kingdom of the Coral Sea Islands in protest to the Australian government's refusal to recognize same-sex marriages. The rainbow flag was the official flag of the claimed kingdom until its dissolution in 2017 following the legalization of same sex marriage in Australia.

=== 2010s to present ===
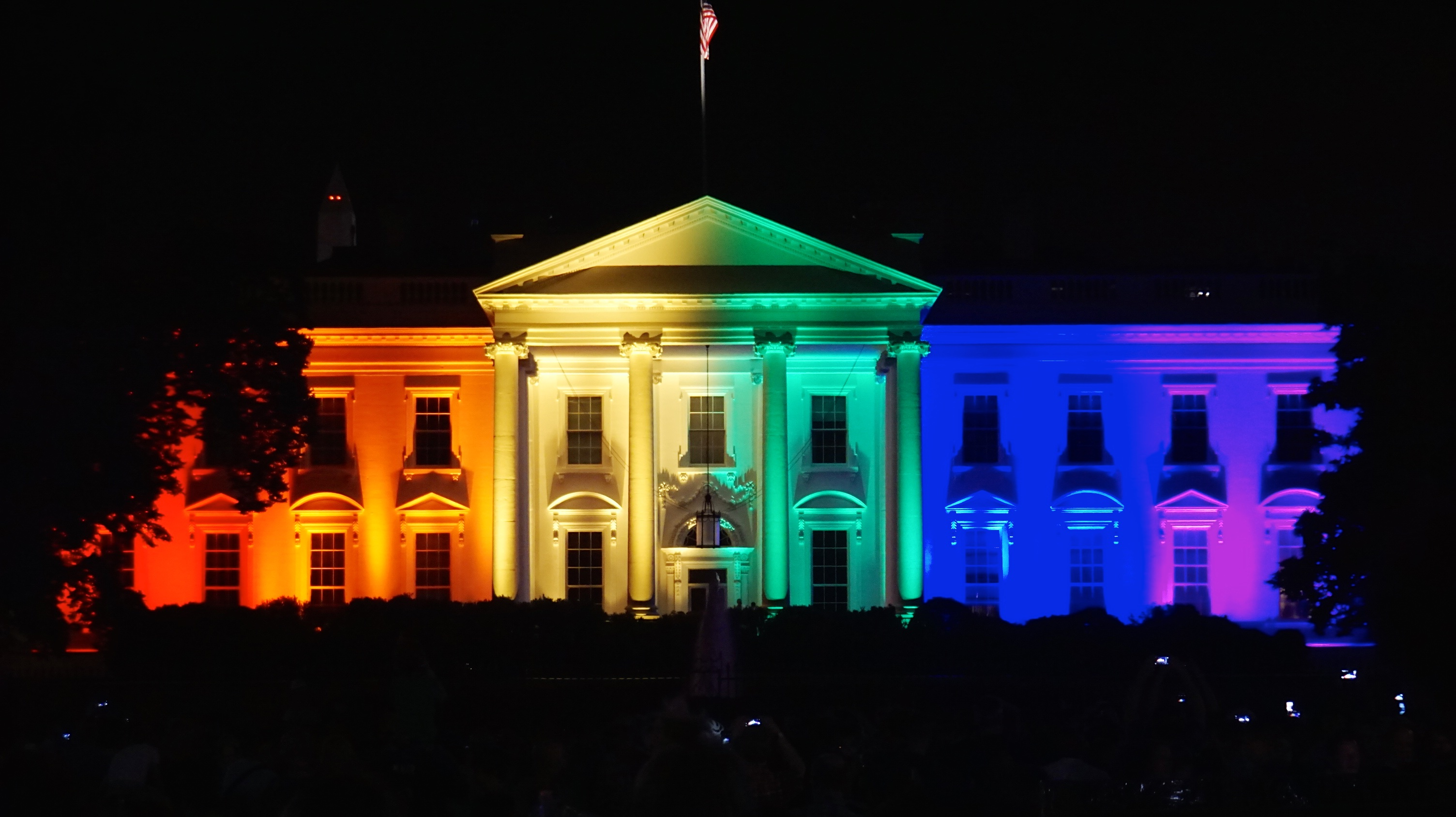
The White House illuminated in the rainbow flag colors in June 2015

In June 2015, The Museum of Modern Art in Manhattan added the rainbow flag symbol to its design collection. The flag was also included in MoMA's Pirouette: Turning Points in Design, a 2025 exhibition which featured "widely recognized design icons [...] highlighting pivotal moments in design history."

On June 26, 2015, the White House was illuminated in the rainbow flag colors to commemorate the legalization of same-sex marriages in all 50 U.S. states, following the Obergefell v. Hodges Supreme Court decision.

An emoji version of the flag (🏳️‍🌈) was formally proposed in July 2016, and released that November.

A portion of one of the original 1978 rainbow flags was donated to the GLBT Historical Society Museum and Archives in San Francisco in April 2021; the section is the only known surviving remnant of the two inaugural eight-color rainbow flags.

Polish nationalists trampled, spat on, and burned the rainbow flag during Independence Day marches in Warsaw in the 2020s. In one case a mob burned down a residential building because it was flying a rainbow flag and had a Women's Strike sign.

In Norway, the flag is reported to symbolize diversity, unity and inclusion, in addition to freedom to be whoever one wants to be and to love whoever one wants to love.

== Transnationalism ==
The rainbow flag has been repurposed to manifest a multitude of transnational and globalized ways of being queer. In a few scholarly articles, the rainbow flag is described as a "floating signifier". A floating signifier refers to the person giving the object its interpreted meaning and significance. Flags are ambivalent symbols that hold different ideologies, meanings, and agendas depending on the beholder. Therefore, the rainbow flag is a boundary object that not only brings together queer communities locally and transnationally, but can also create debates and conflicts.

In March 2016, rainbow stamps were created by a postal service common to Sweden and Denmark celebrating pride traversing borders internationally. It has become common to display a rainbow in store fronts or on websites to indicate that the space is queer-friendly. Many government official buildings in countries in Europe and America display the rainbow flag.

In some countries, such as Saudi Arabia, it is illegal to sell (or wear) "rainbow-coloured" items, as it "indirectly promotes homosexuality" and claims to "contradict normal common sense". The motives have aroused international criticism.

=== Coded flags ===
Coded or hidden flags have been made using colors of the rainbow to support LGBTQ rights and express political views. In 2018, Russia hosted the FIFA World Cup, which partially coincided with Pride Month. Because Russian legislation bans the display of LGBTQ symbols, Spanish LGBTQ rights group FELGTB and Spanish creative agency LOLA Mullenlowe conceived a plan for six activists from six countries to wear a team jersey from their country during the tournament. The colors of the six jerseys corresponded with the colors of the rainbow flag (Spain, red; The Netherlands, orange; Brazil, yellow; Mexico, green; Argentina, blue; Colombia, purple). They traveled around Russia together, positioned so that their jerseys formed a rainbow that was visible to the public but seemingly inconspicuous to authorities. Pictures of the group standing together in front of famous Russian buildings and next to police officers circulated online. This action was intended, in part, to raise awareness about Russia's anti-LGBTQ laws.

In Poland on August 6, 2020, President Andrzej Duda was sworn in for a second term supporting an anti-LGBTQ campaign and the opposing politicians planned to coordinate and wear a colored outfit to each represent a color of the rainbow to stand in protest.

=== Critiques ===
Concern has been expressed among some of the rainbow symbol being white-washed and regressed to maintain a Eurocentric and colonial influence. There is also a critique made about how the pride flag has deviated too much from its purpose as a radical symbol for queer rights specifically.

== Notable variations ==
Notable variations

Gilbert Baker nine-stripe flag

Intersex Inclusive Progress Pride Flag

New Pride Flag

Philadelphia eight-stripe flag

Progress Pride Flag

Social Justice Pride Flag

=== Gilbert Baker's nine-stripe flag ===
Gilbert Baker created a nine-stripe version of the flag in March 2017, adding a lavender stripe to symbolize diversity. Baker created the flag in response to the 2016 election of Donald Trump.

=== New Pride Flag ===
This rainbow flag design is diagonal black, brown, light blue, pink, and white stripes overlaid on a traditional six-color rainbow flag. The design is intended to represent transgender and queer people of color. Puerto Rican author and vegan activist Julia Feliz conceived the idea, and Hayley Brown designed the flag to focus on transgender and queer people of color.

This design resembles a flag proposed earlier by Daniel Quasar, which used a chevron of similar colors on a rainbow background. Quasar's design aimed to represent the same identity groups. The new design's creators, Julia Feliz and Hayley Brown, do not acknowledge Quasar's design. Some critics allege that the Quasar design appropriates aspects of the Puerto Rico Pride flag, while Quasar maintains their design was unintentional and supports the new campaign.

=== Philadelphia eight-stripe flag ===
In June 2017, the city of Philadelphia adopted a revised version of the flag designed by the marketing firm Tierney that adds black and brown stripes to the top of the standard six-color flag, to draw attention to issues of people of color within the LGBTQ community.

On February 12, 2018, during the street carnival of São Paulo, thousands of people attended a parade called Love Fest, which celebrated human diversity, sexual and gender equality. A version of the flag, created by Estêvão Romane, co-founder of the festival, was unveiled which presented the original eight stripe flag with a white stripe in the middle, representing all colors (human diversity in terms of religion, gender, sex preferences, ethnicities), and peace and union among all.

=== Progress Pride Flag ===
In June 2018, designer Daniel Quasar released a redesign incorporating elements from both the Philadelphia flag and trans pride flag to bring focus on inclusion and progress within the community. The flag design spread quickly as the Progress Pride Flag on social media, prompting worldwide coverage in news outlets. While retaining the common six-stripe rainbow design as a base, the "Progress" variation adds a chevron along the hoist that features black, brown, light blue, pink, and white stripes to bring those communities (marginalized people of color, trans people, and those living with HIV/AIDS and those who have been lost) to the forefront; "the arrow points to the right to show forward movement, while being along the left edge shows that progress still needs to be made".

=== Intersex Inclusive Progress Pride Flag ===
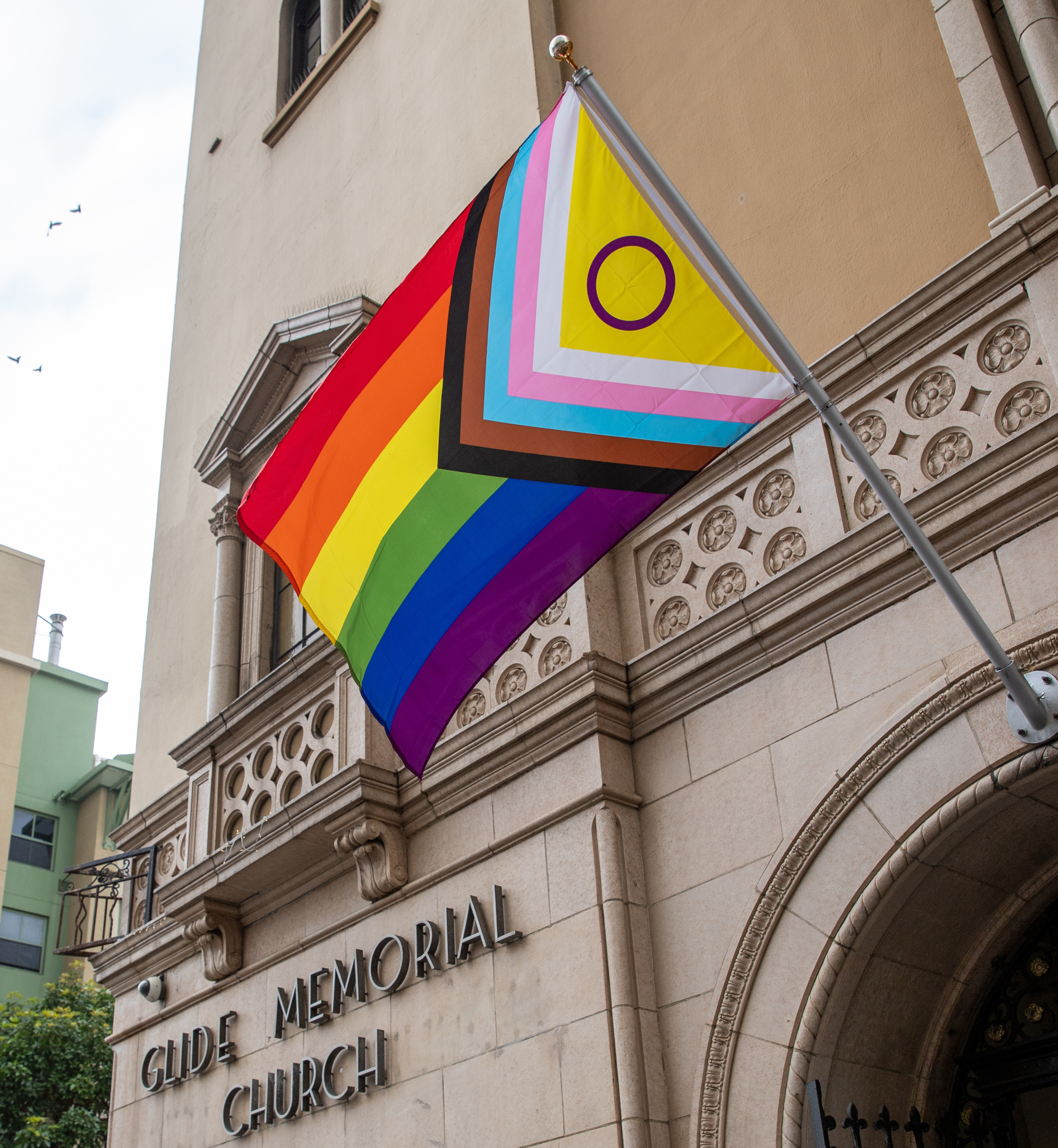
Intersex Inclusive Progress Pride flag at Glide Memorial Church, San Francisco

In 2021, Valentino Vecchietti of Intersex Equality Rights UK redesigned the Progress Pride Flag to incorporate the intersex flag. This design added a yellow triangle with a purple circle in it to the chevron of the Progress Pride flag. It also changed the color of green to a lighter shade without adding new symbolism. Intersex Equality Rights UK posted the new flag on Instagram and Twitter.

=== Social Justice Pride Flag ===
In July 2018 the Social Justice Pride Flag was released in Chennai, India at the Chennai Queer LitFest, inspired by the other variations of the Pride flag around the world. The flag was designed by Chennai-based gay activist Moulee. The design incorporated elements representing Self-Respect Movement, anti-caste movement and leftist ideology in its design. While retaining the original six stripes of the rainbow flag, the Social Justice Pride Flag incorporates black representing the Self-Respect Movement, blue representing Ambedkarite movement and red representing left values.

=== Reception ===
The reception to new variations and iterations of the Pride Flag have been mixed. Supporters have praised the focus on inclusion, and the highlighting the role and discrimination of people of color in the LGBTQ community. At the same time, some have expressed concern that the changes only act as a "performance, creating the impression of inclusion without real commitment", or that they have been "for the sake of branding", while not reflecting any actual "material steps towards real equality". Others have remained critical, arguing that the original design already acts as a symbol of diversity, and emphasized that the original flag was designed without any racial dimension in mind. Other critics have called the variations "patronizing" and that they have taken away some "universality". Both the Philadelphia Pride Flag and the Progress Pride Flag were met with some controversy and backlash for these reasons, but also praise and widespread adoption.

Quasar's iteration of the progress pride flag is licensed under a Creative Commons license which excludes commercial use; this has been criticized as not being in keeping with Baker's original intent for the first iteration of the flag. Quasar has stated openly that small organizations can use the flag commercially and the license was chosen to put restrictions on large corporations. Quasar stated that: "A changing point for me was when I started to see it getting used in a way that I didn't personally agree with. Companies were snatching it up, making stuff out of it, and selling it without my attribution attached. It was purely rainbow capitalism based marketing… If you're going to make money off of something that I created within my community it's only fair that you give back not just to me as the artist, but the community itself, too." Criticism of the flag has also been made by LGBTQ people of color, who felt that the flag, despite its inclusive intent, was created without community consultation.

=== Other variations ===
Many variations of the rainbow flag have been used. Some of the more common ones include the Greek letter lambda (lower case) in white in the middle of the flag and a pink triangle or black triangle in the upper left corner. Other colors have been added, such as a black stripe symbolizing those community members lost to AIDS. The rainbow colors have also often been used in gay alterations of national and regional flags, replacing for example the red and white stripes of the flag of the United States. In 2007, the Pride Family Flag was unveiled at the Houston, Texas pride parade.

The "Victory over AIDS" flag includes a black stripe

In the early years of the AIDS pandemic, activists designed a "Victory over AIDS" flag consisting of the standard six-stripe rainbow flag with a black stripe across the bottom. Leonard Matlovich, himself dying of AIDS-related illness, suggested that upon a cure for AIDS being discovered, the black stripes be removed from the flags and burned.

In 2002, another LGBTQ activist, Eddie Reynoso, recreated Gilbert Baker's original 1978 tie-dye flag, incorporating a blue canton, with white stars that were painted to a pink color, as residents in states across the nation gained the right to same-gender marriage. The flag, named the Pride Constellation, was first painted on a canvas as a protest symbol during Nevada's constitutional amendment to define marriage as that between a man and a woman. In 2009, the flag was featured prominently on local and national news outlets as they reported on the California Supreme Court's ruling to uphold the state's marriage equality ban.

Reynoso later rearranged the stars by order of admission into the Union, retaining part of Gilbert Baker's tie-dye flag and the Pride New Glory Flag.

In 2015, Reynoso's flag once again made national news after it was featured across various news outlets reporting on the Obergefell v. Hodges oral arguments at the Supreme Court.

Following the 2016 Orlando nightclub shooting, posters containing a rainbow Gadsden flag inscribed with "#ShootBack" were placed around West Hollywood.

=== Government flags ===
While the rainbow flag has not been officially incorporated into the flags in any countries, some states and municipalities have flown the pride flag alongside the state flag to demonstrate inclusivity and support for LGBTQ communities. Some countries, like Germany, allow the rainbow flag to be flown on government buildings on specific occasions. Some states, provinces and municipalities allow the rainbow flag to be flown on government buildings. Embassies and consulates of LGBTQ-friendly countries may fly the rainbow flag alongside their national flag to show solidarity with the LGBTQ community.

Gay pride flag of South Africa

A South African gay pride flag which is a hybrid of the rainbow flag and the national flag of South Africa was launched in Cape Town in 2010. Flag designer Eugene Brockman said: "I truly believe we (the LGBT community) put the dazzle into our rainbow nation and this flag is a symbol of just that."

In 2018, marchers at the Equality March in Częstochowa carried a modified version of the flag of Poland in rainbow colors. They were reported to prosecutors for desecration of national symbols of Poland, but the prosecutors determined that no crime had been committed.

A US spending bill passed in 2024 restricts flying any flag other than the US flag over US embassies. This means Pride flags cannot be flown on flagpoles at the top of embassies. However, this does not ban displaying Pride flags elsewhere on embassy grounds, like inside offices or on lower flagpoles.

In 2025, multiple U.S. cities adopted resolutions to name Pride flags as "official flags" of their municipalities, as loopholes around state laws banning their display by governmental buildings, including the cities of Missoula, Montana (which did not have an official city flag before then), and Boise, Idaho. Salt Lake City similarly granted official flag status to customized versions of the Progress flag, transgender flag, and Juneteenth flag incorporating the Sego lily symbol from the city's main flag.

Other unofficial proposals and designs incorporating the rainbow flag into state, province, and municipal flags exist but have not gained widespread adoption.

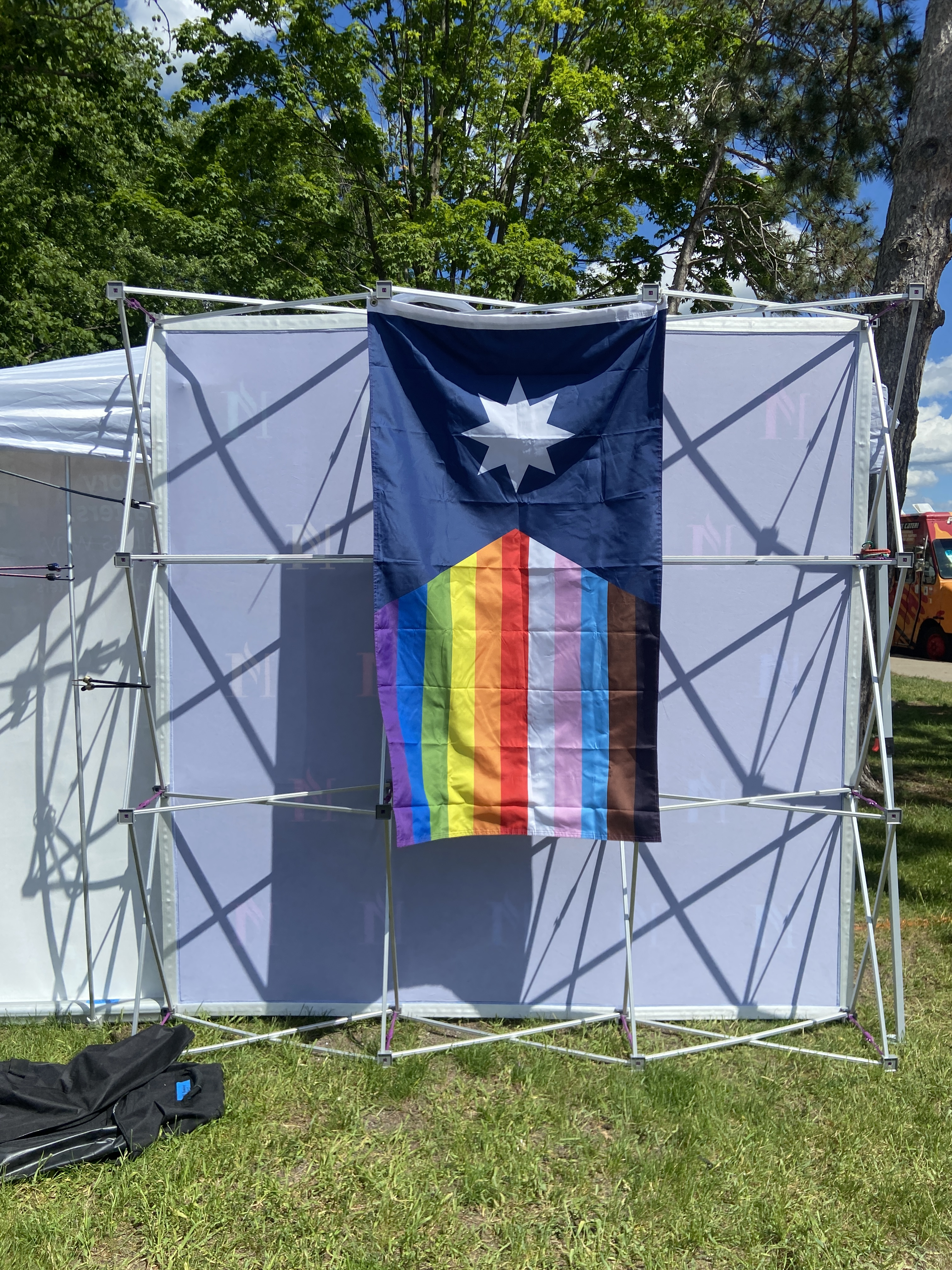
A Minnesota State Flag with a rainbow flag design on the field.

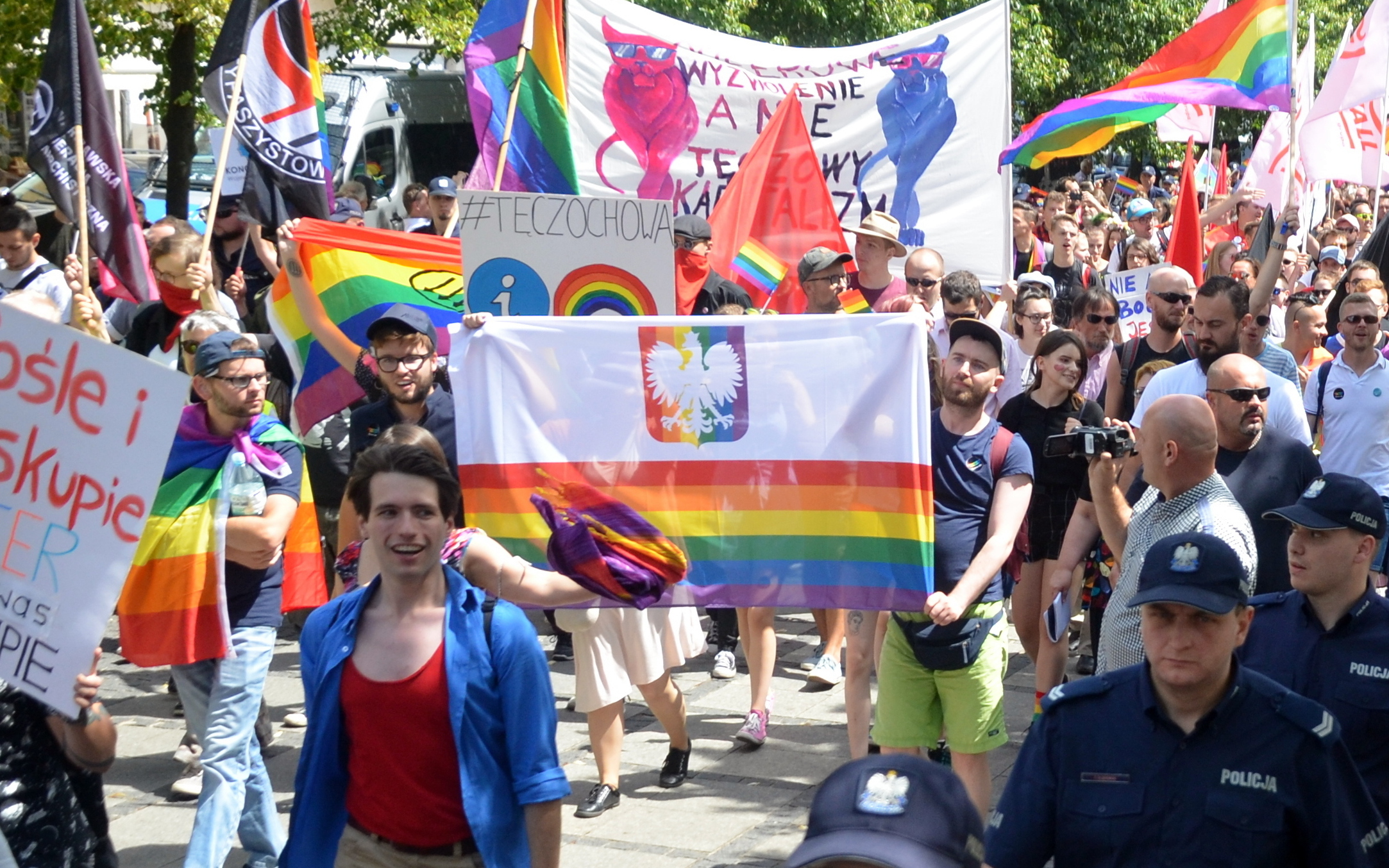
Bartosz Staszewski (left) carries a rainbow version of the flag of Poland at the 2018 Equality March in Częstochowa.

The Sego Belonging Flag, adopted in 2025 as an official flag of Salt Lake City, Utah; it is based on the Progress Pride flag.

== Notable flag creations ==
=== Mile-long flags ===
The mile-and-a-quarter-long flag (2 km) stretching across Key West in 2003

For the 25th anniversary of the June 1969 Stonewall riots in 1994, flag creator Baker, a.k.a. Sister Chanel 2001 of the Sisters of Perpetual Indulgence, was commissioned to create the world's largest rainbow flag. The mile-long flag, dubbed "Raise the Rainbow", took months of planning and teams of volunteers to coordinate every aspect. The flag utilized the basic six colors and measured 30 feet (9.1 m) wide. After the march, foot-wide (0.30 m) sections of the flag were given to individual sponsors after the event had ended. Additional large sections of the flag were sent with activists and used in pride parades and LGBTQ marches worldwide. One large section was later taken to Shanghai Pride in 2014 by a small contingent of San Francisco Sisters of Perpetual Indulgence, and documented in the film Stilettos for Shanghai. The Guinness Book of World Records confirmed it as the world's largest flag.

In 2003, Baker was again commissioned to produce a giant flag marking the 25th anniversary of the flag itself. Dubbed "25 Rainbow Sea to Sea", the project entailed Baker again working with teams of volunteers but this flag utilized the original eight colors and measured one and a quarter miles (2 km) across Key West, Florida, from the Atlantic Ocean to the Gulf of Mexico. The flag was again divided afterwards and sections were sent to over a hundred cities worldwide.

=== Other large flags ===
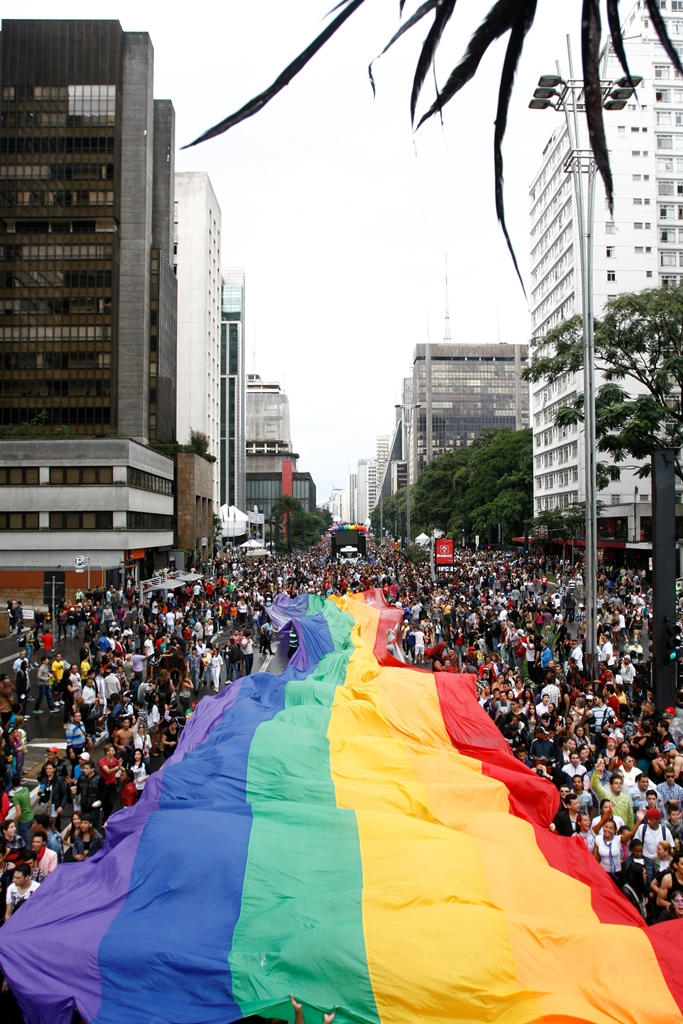
Large rainbow flag being carried in the São Paulo LGBTQ Pride

The largest rainbow flag in the Southern Hemisphere is a six-stripe one first flown to mark the fourth Nelson Mandela Bay (NMB) Pride in 2014, held in the city of Port Elizabeth, Eastern Cape province, South Africa. It measures twelve by eight metres (39 by 26 ft), and flies on the country's tallest flag pole, which is sixty metres (200 ft) high, and is in Donkin Reserve, in Port Elizabeth's central business district. NMB Pride had the flag manufactured, in part, as a symbol for LGBTQ youth to feel empowered even if they were not able to come out. On the decision to fly the flag, a spokesperson for the municipality said, NMB "officially adds its voice to governments committing, firstly, to recognizing the LGBT community, and most importantly, to uphold the rights of the LGBT community". It is regularly flown for NMB Pride as well as March 21 which is Human Rights Day in South Africa, and International Day for the Elimination of Racial Discrimination, both commemorating the 1960 Sharpeville massacre.

On June 1, 2018, Venice Pride in California flew the world's largest free-flying flag to launch United We Pride. After its debut for Venice Pride, the flag traveled to San Francisco at the end of the month for SF Pride and the fortieth anniversary of the rainbow flag's adoption. United We Pride then had the flag sent to Paris, London, Berlin, Vancouver, Sydney, Miami, and Tokyo, ending in New York City for Stonewall 50 – WorldPride NYC 2019. The giant flag was produced by the flag originator Gilbert Baker, and measures 131 square metres (1,410 sq ft).

In June 2019, to coincide with the fifty-year anniversary of the Stonewall Riots, steps at the Franklin D. Roosevelt Four Freedoms Park were turned into the largest LGBTQ pride flag. The rainbow-decorated 12-by-100-foot (3.7 m × 30.5 m) staircase Ascend With Pride was installed June 14–30.

== Influence ==
=== Additional pride flags ===
The popularity of the rainbow flag has influenced the creation and adoption of a wide variety of multi-color multi-striped flags used to communicate specific identities within the LGBTQ community, including but not limited to the bisexual pride flag, pansexual pride flag, and transgender pride flags.

=== Spirit Day ===
Spirit Day, an annual LGBTQ awareness day since 2010, takes its name from the violet stripe representing "spirit" on the rainbow flag. Participants wear purple to show support for LGBTQ youth who are victims of bullying.

=== Notable incorporations of the rainbow flag ===
==== Freedom Rings ====
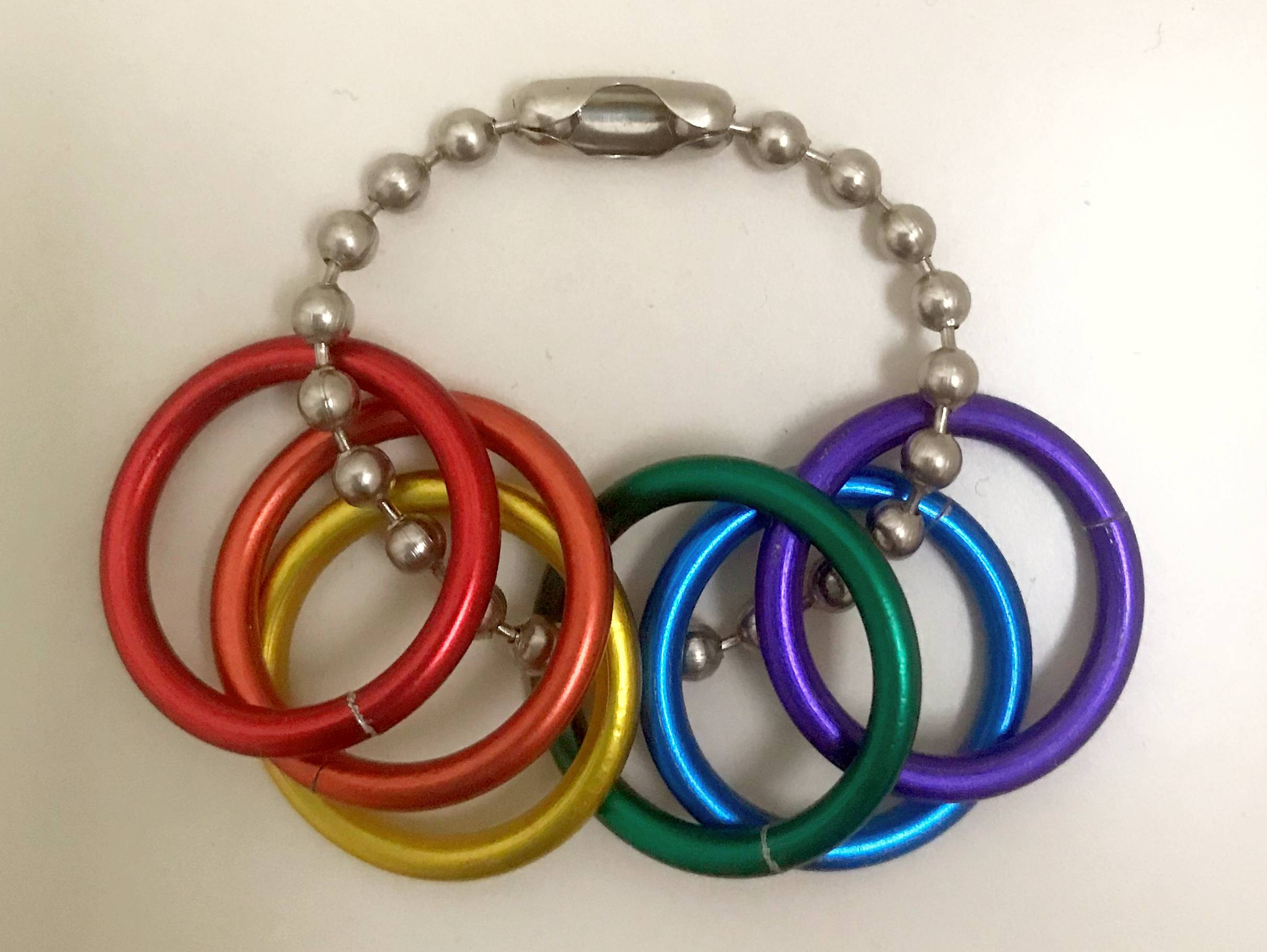
Freedom Rings on a keychain

Freedom Rings, designed by David Spada in 1991, are six aluminum rings, each in one of the colors of the rainbow flag. These rings are worn by themselves or as part of necklaces, bracelets, and keychains. They are a symbol of gay pride, and were originally sold as a fundraiser for the 1991 San Francisco Gay Freedom Day Parade and quickly became a national trend. In June 1992, several of MTV's on-air hosts wore Freedom Rings in recognition of Pride Month, elevating their visibility. They are sometimes referred to as "Fruit Loops".

==== Gaysper ====
Gaysper is an LGBTQ symbol based on the ghost emoji "👻" with a rainbow flag background. It gained popularity in Spain from April 2019 after a tweet from the official account of the far-right party Vox, after which a multitude of users belonging to the LGBTQ movement began to use it as a symbol. The icon has established itself as an example of the phenomenon of reappropriation of elements of the anti-LGBTQ discourse in contemporary society through social networks.

==== Rainbow crossings ====
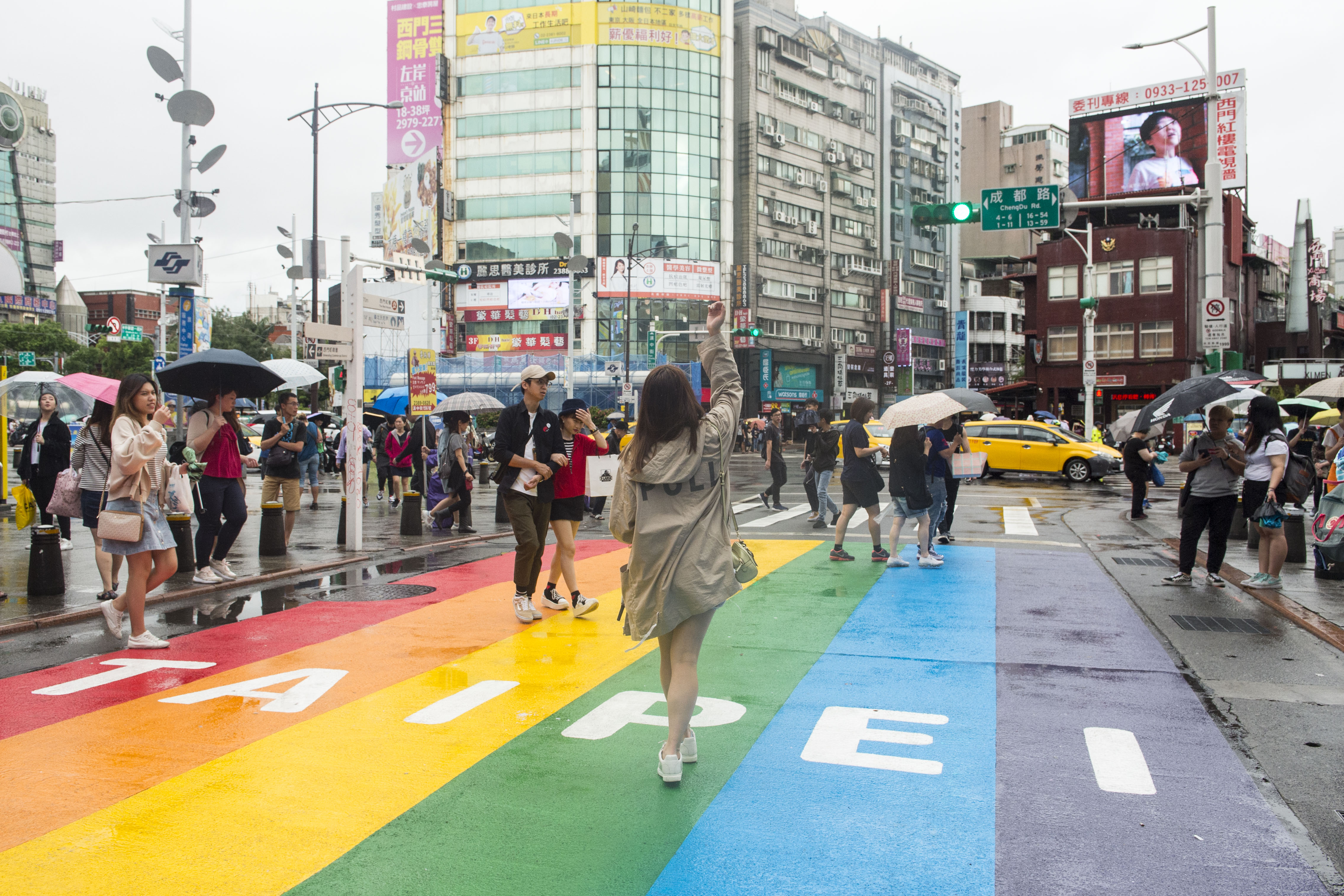
The first temporary Rainbow crossing in the world appeared in 2008 in Taiwan. This photo shows a Rainbow crossing in Taiwan in 2019.

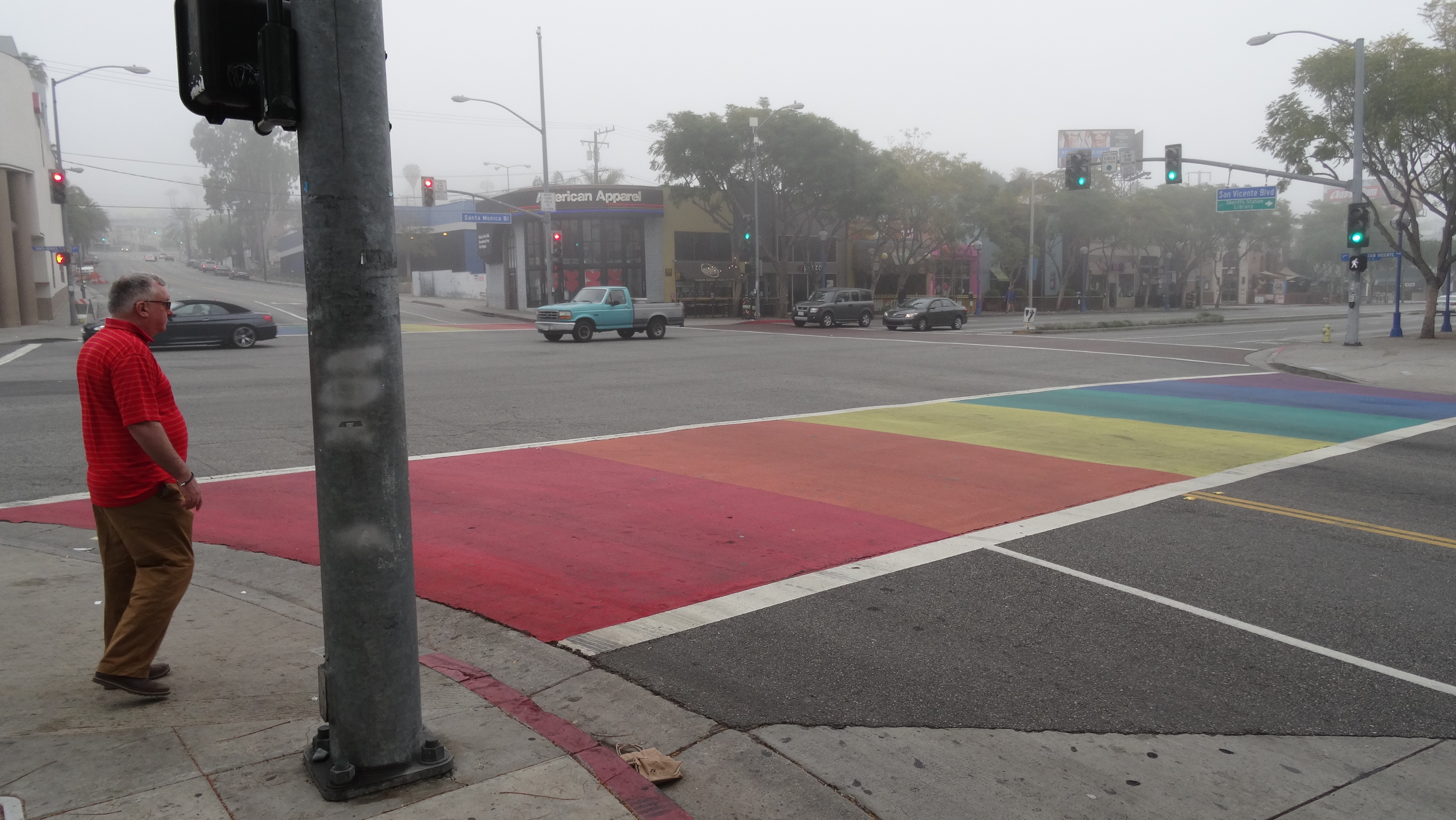
The first permanent rainbow crossing in the world was installed in time for the LA Pride Parade in June 2012. The crossing sits alongside the LA Pride Parade route on Santa Monica Boulevard, West Hollywood. Photo taken in 2016.

The first temporary rainbow crossing appeared in 2008 in Taipei, Taiwan, and then the first permanent crossing was installed on Santa Monica Boulevard in West Hollywood in time for the 2012 LA Pride parade. The idea spread to other cities as symbols of support for the LGBTQ community. Early installations inspired movements such as Sydney's DIY Rainbow campaign in 2013, where residents used chalk to recreate a removed rainbow crossing. This action grew through social media as people worldwide shared similar chalk designs to promote inclusion. Permanent crossings were later installed in Sydney and other cities, though they also faced opposition and vandalism.

Governments and organizations have debated rainbow crossing safety and accessibility. The U.S. Federal Highway Administration discouraged nonstandard markings, while later studies suggested crossings with color art reduced traffic accidents. Disability advocates raised safety concerns for people with visual or cognitive impairments. Some regions, including parts of Canada and Florida, have banned them, claiming neutrality, which critics say limits community expression.

== Backlash ==
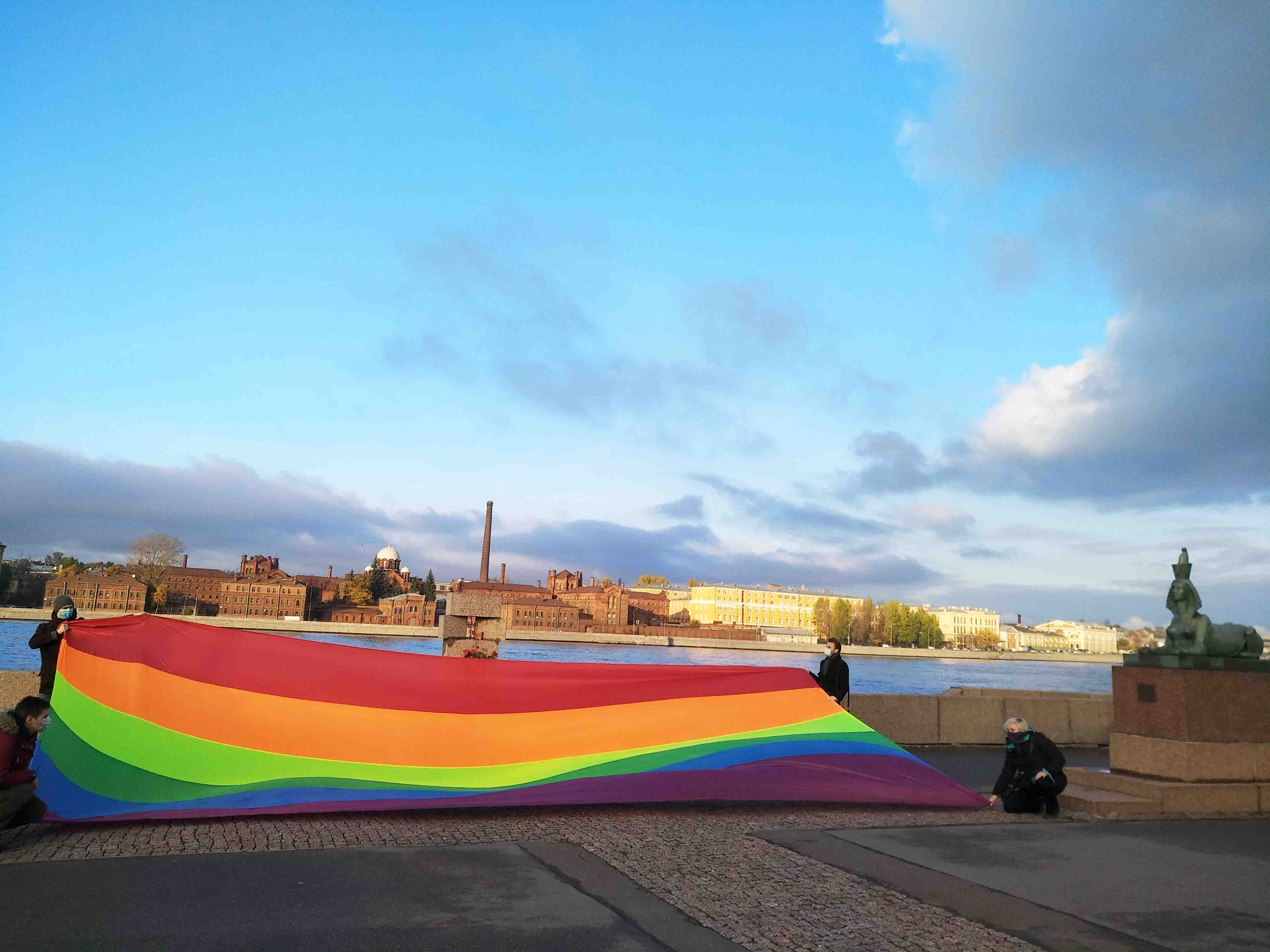
A rainbow flag being displayed in St. Petersburg as a monument to people facing political repression in Russia. In June 2012 a hundred-year ban on pride parades was enacted in Moscow. In 2023 a new law criminalized any expression of support for the LGBTQIA+ movement in Russia and designated the "international LGBT movement" an "extremist" group. Photo taken in 2020.

Companies have often used the rainbow flag and similar imagery as part of efforts to promote solidarity with the LGBTQ+ community (including the use of rainbows on social media profile pictures during Pride observances, and the sale of rainbow-themed products marketed as being inspired by Pride). Some companies have faced criticism for doing so as performative, short-term cause marketing to capitalize and profit from the LGBTQ+ community without making sustained efforts to engage and support it, often while simultaneously engaging in business practices considered harmful to the LGBTQ+ community. This practice is often referred to as "pinkwashing" or "rainbow-washing", in reference to similar practices of cause marketing surrounding breast cancer. Multinational corporations have usually avoided utilizing Pride-themed marketing campaigns in regions where LGBTQ+ rights are restricted (such as the Middle East) or are considered controversial (such as the United States, where many companies downplayed Pride promotions in 2025 due to the second Trump administration and its scrutiny of diversity, equity, and inclusion [DEI] initiatives).

Some jurisdictions have banned the display of Pride flags and related products as part of anti-LGBTQ sentiment. Russia prohibits the distribution of "propaganda of non-traditional sexual relationships", and designated the "international LGBT movement" as an "extremist" group in 2023—criminalizing any expression of support of the LGBTQ movement; the ruling classified the rainbow flag as a symbol of the "international LGBT movement". Multiple jurisdictions in Canada (particularly in the province of Alberta) and the United States have banned the display of non-governmental flags and symbols on public property to promote political "neutrality"; these bans are usually intended to prohibit the official display of Pride flags. Efforts to similarly ban the display of Pride flags and symbols at schools have focused on allegations that these displays "indoctrinate" children.

As a loophole, the U.S. cities of Missoula, Montana, Boise, Idaho, and Salt Lake City, Utah all passed resolutions declaring the Pride flag or versions of it to be official municipal flags (with Missoula being a unique case of this loophole, as the city never had an official flag at all), theoretically allowing their display under these laws. In March 2026, Boise was forced to remove its Pride flag display, after state law was amended to remove this loophole by prohibiting the display of municipal flags that were adopted after 2023. The city responded by instead placing a banner on its city hall with the stripes of the Progress flag and the slogan "Creating a city for everyone", and putting a design of the Progress flag on the flag poles themselves.

== See also ==
- GLBT Historical Society: archival collection includes the only known surviving remnant of the original 1978 rainbow flags, along with a sewing machine used in their creation
- Rainbows in culture
- Sexuality and gender identity-based cultures
