= Szczecin Equality March =

Equality march taking place in Szczecin

The Szczecin Equality March (Polish: Szczeciński Marsz Równości) is an annual demonstration in Szczecin for the LGBT rights in Poland, as part of the equality marches in Poland. The first event took place in 2018, and was also organised in 2019, 2021 and 2023.
