= Equality marches in Poland =

Pride parades in Poland

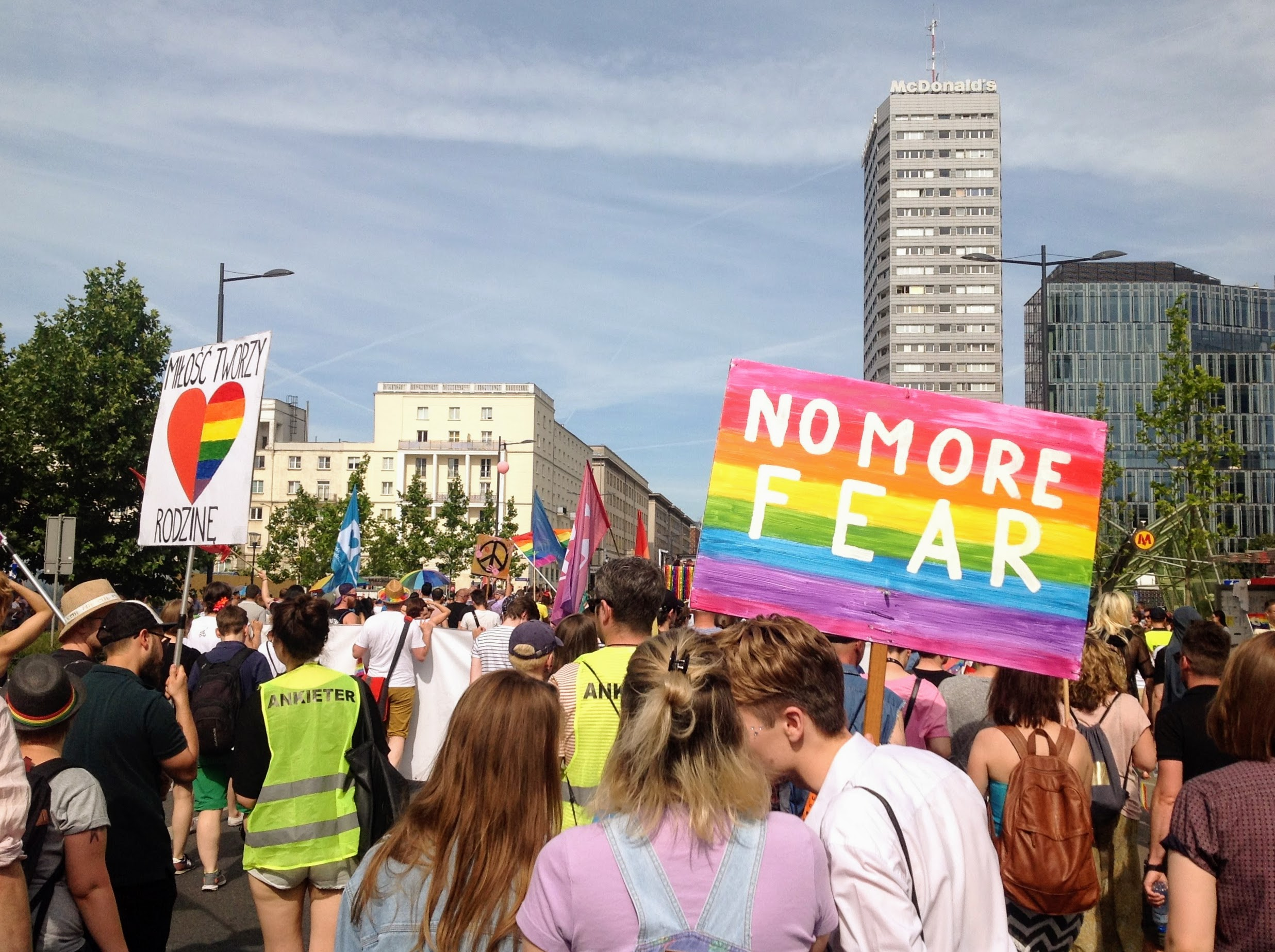
Warsaw Equality Parade in 2018

Equality marches or equality parades (Polish: marsze równości; parady równości) are the Polish equivalent of pride parades, which aim to improve LGBTQ rights in Poland. They have been held in various Polish cities and towns since 2001.

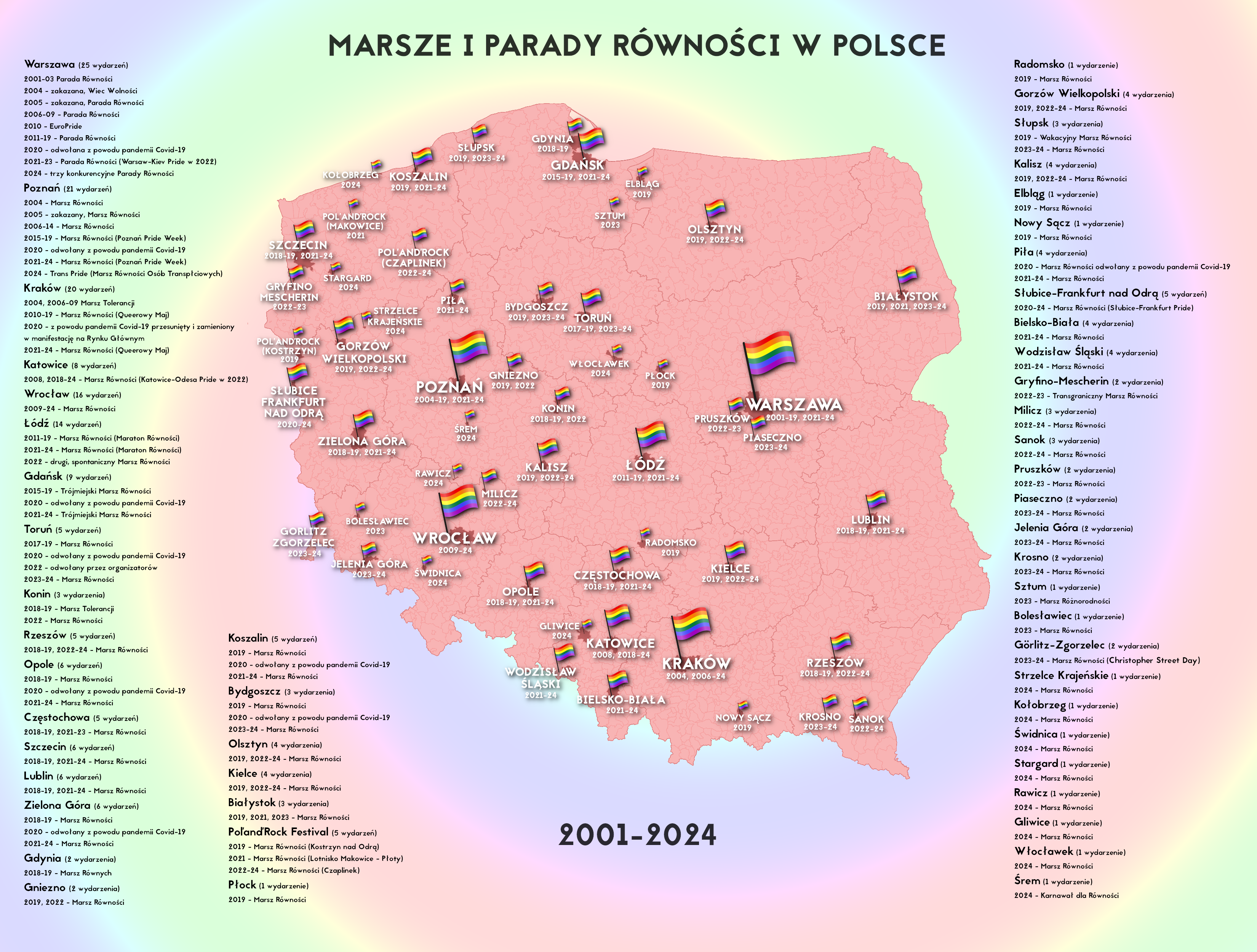
Equality marches in Poland 2001–2023

== Overview ==
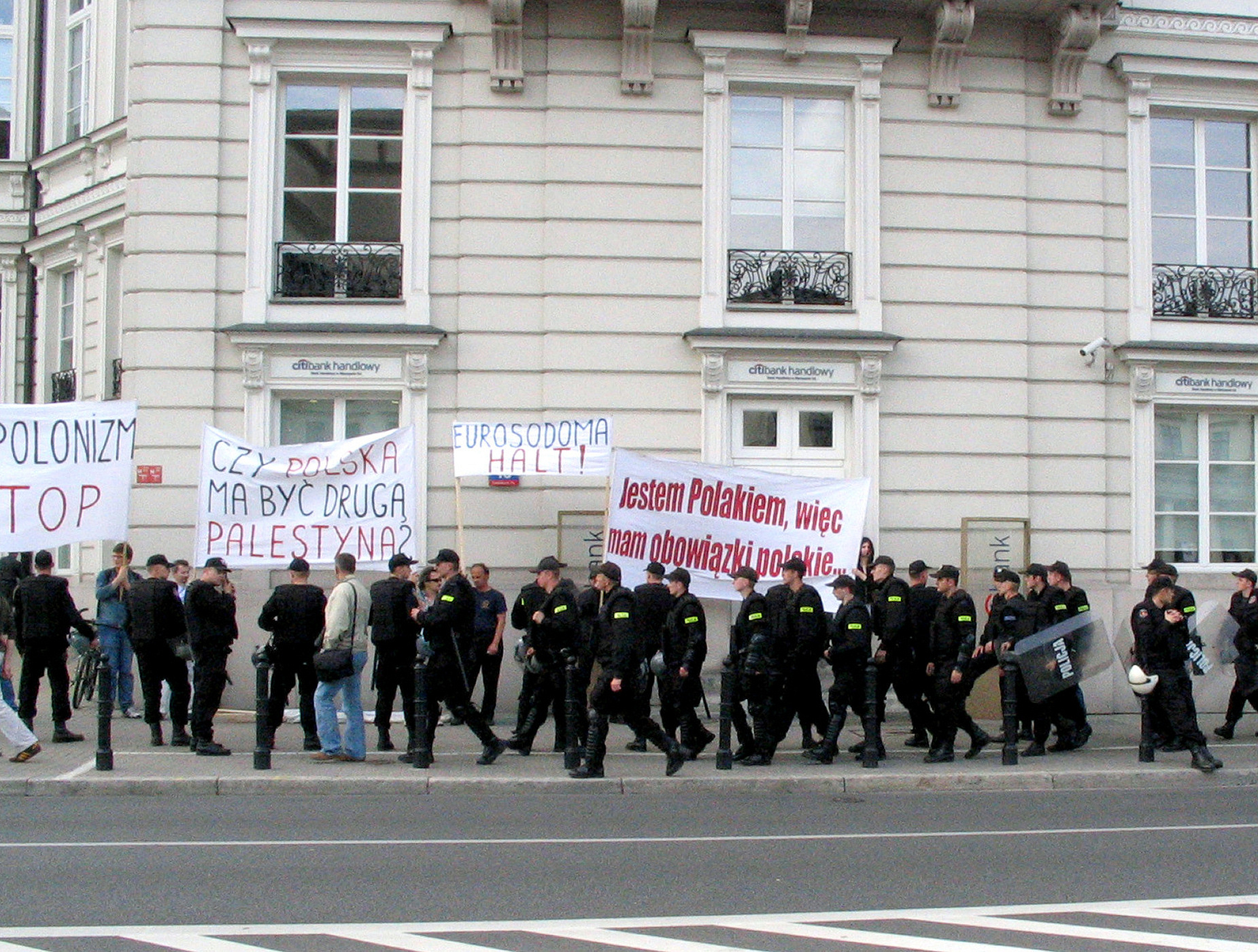
Counter-protesters against the 2006 Equality Parade in Warsaw

In 2007 (Bączkowski v Poland), the 2005 ban on holding equality marches in Warsaw was overturned by the European Court of Human Rights. The court judged that bans undermined the prohibition on discrimination and freedom of assembly guaranteed by the European Convention on Human Rights.

Only a few marches were held until the late 2010s when the ruling Law and Justice party campaigned against LGBTQ rights. Since then, the rallies have spread to more conservative municipalities in Poland. In 2019, at least 25 marches were held, up from seven in 2017 and fifteen in 2018.

Many right-wing politicians oppose the equality marches as a "threat to public morality" and an effort to "promote homosexuality". They often reference obscene scenes that have occurred at Berlin's Love Parades. Former president Lech Kaczyński stated, "Gay people may protest as citizens but not as homosexuals". Adviser to the Polish prime minister Jarosław Kaczyński stated that equality marches are "a real threat to ... the Polish state". Neo-Nazi activists have held signs stating "Europa=Sodoma". Left-wing supporters of the marchers argue that they are a part of Europeanization and that freedom of assembly is a human right. Media reports on the marches often feature "ordinary people" who are disgusted by public displays and claim to have no issue with LGBTQ people as long as they remain hidden. One form of opposition is to organize "March for Life and Family"; 130 of these were held in 2019.

== By city ==
=== Warsaw ===
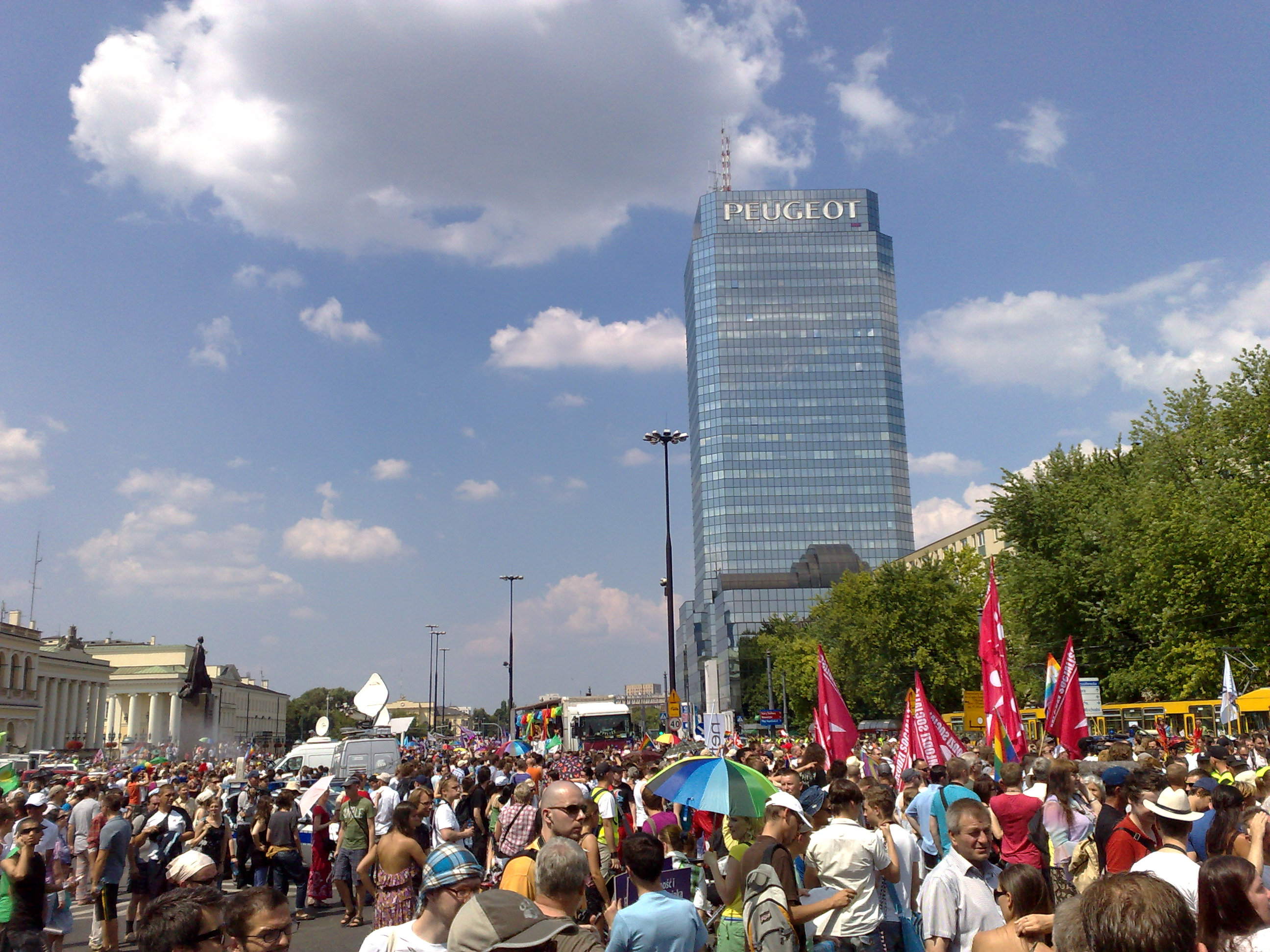
EuroPride 2010, held in Warsaw

An equality march has been held in Warsaw since 2001, the first gay march in the former Communist bloc. In 2005, All-Polish Youth planned to hold a countermarch called "Normality Parade" (Polish: Parada Normalności); instead, the equality march was cancelled by then-mayor Lech Kaczyński, who argued that the event promoted a "homosexual lifestyle". In 2010, EuroPride was held in Warsaw for the first time in a formerly Communist country. Several thousand people attended, and anti-gay groups collected 50,000 signatures that the event should be cancelled. In 2019, around 47,000 people participated, including (for the first time) the mayor of Warsaw, Rafał Trzaskowski. It was the largest pride parade in central and Eastern Europe.

=== Kraków ===
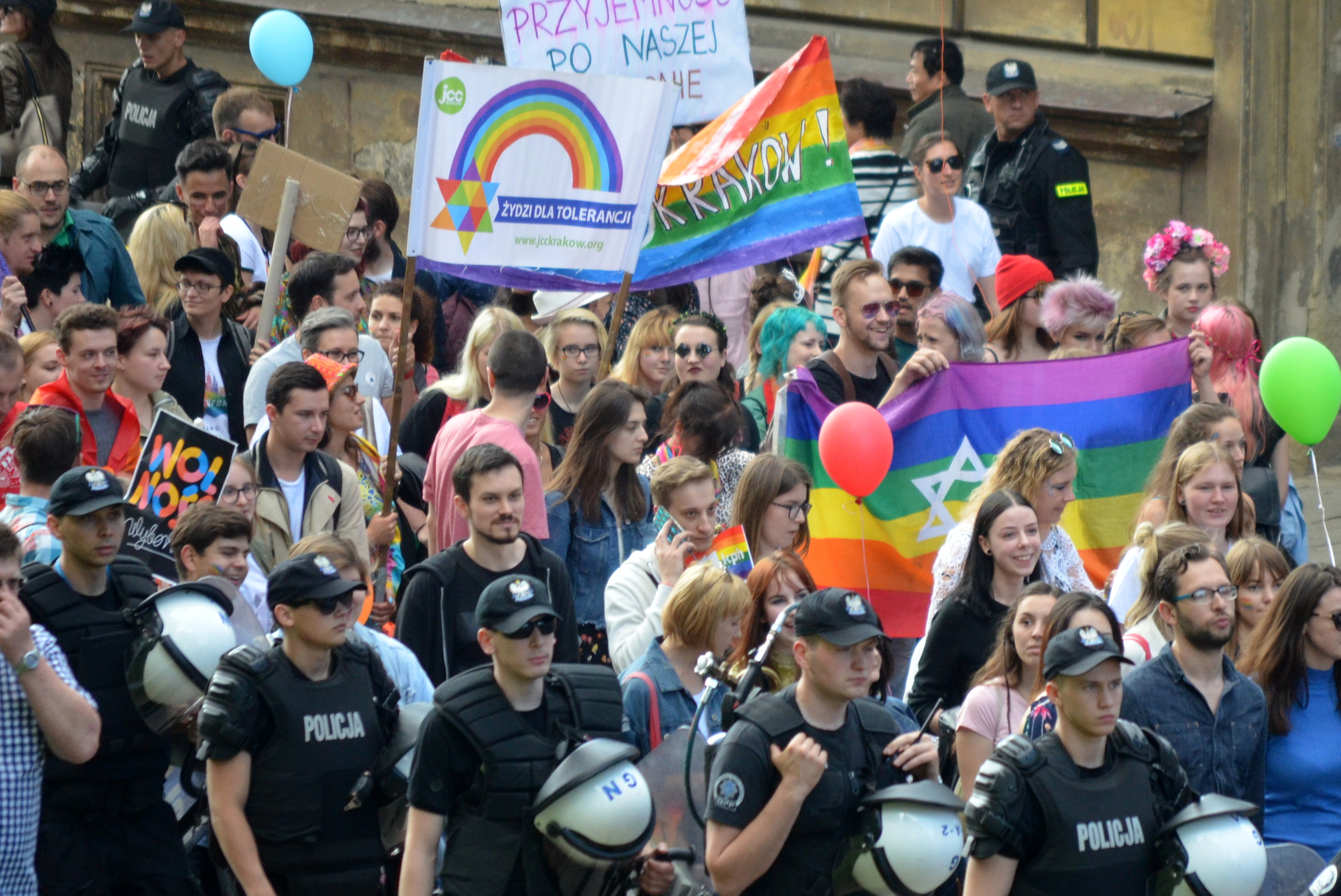
Kraków Equality March, 19 May 2018

The equality march has been held in Kraków since 2004. Before 2010, it was called a "tolerance march". In 2017, counter-demonstrators from All-Polish Youth directed participants towards a nearby psychiatric hospital, as if homosexuality is a disease.

=== Poznań ===
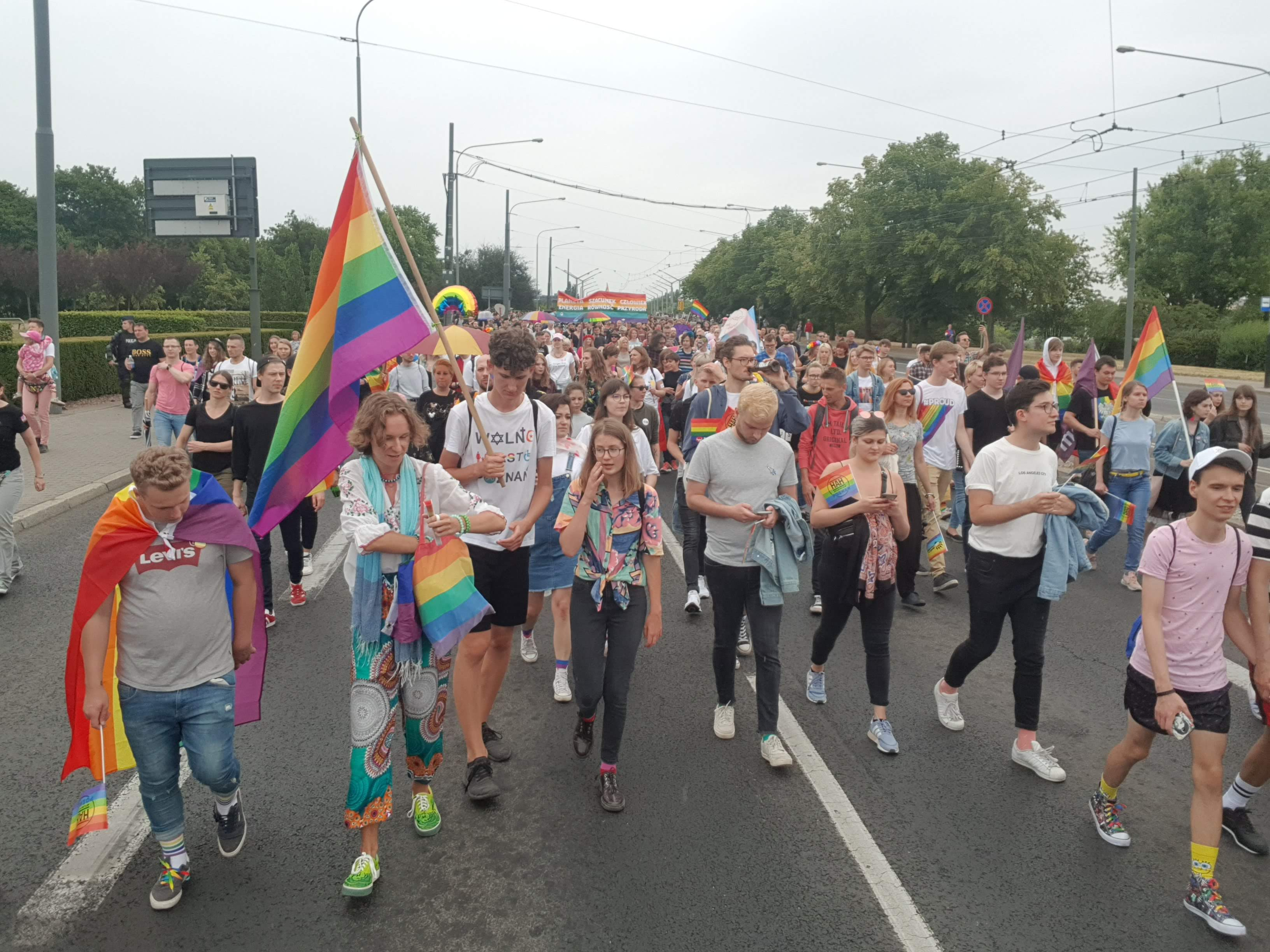
Equality march in Poznań, 6 July 2019

In Poznań, an equality march was held on 19 November 2005. The mayor attempted to ban it but was unsuccessful.

=== Katowice ===
The first Katowice Equality March took place in 2008. After a 10-year old hiatus, new equality marches took place in 2018 and 2019.

=== Łódź ===
The equality march in Łódź was first held in 2011. In 2015, vice-mayor Tomasz Trela was present. In 2019, the march was sponsored for the first time by the city authorities, although the mayor, Hanna Zdanowska, was not present, the head of the city council Marcin Gołaszewski, did attend. About 200 people participated and the marchers had to alter their route due to non-existent counter-demonstrations announced in advance by nationalist groups.

=== Gdańsk ===
The Tricity Equality March (for Gdańsk-Gdynia-Sopot) has been held in Gdańsk since 2015. Notably, the assassinated mayor Paweł Adamowicz opened the 2017 march and his successor, Aleksandra Dulkiewicz, opened the 2019 march.

=== Toruń ===
The equality march in Toruń was first held in October 2017.

=== Rzeszów ===
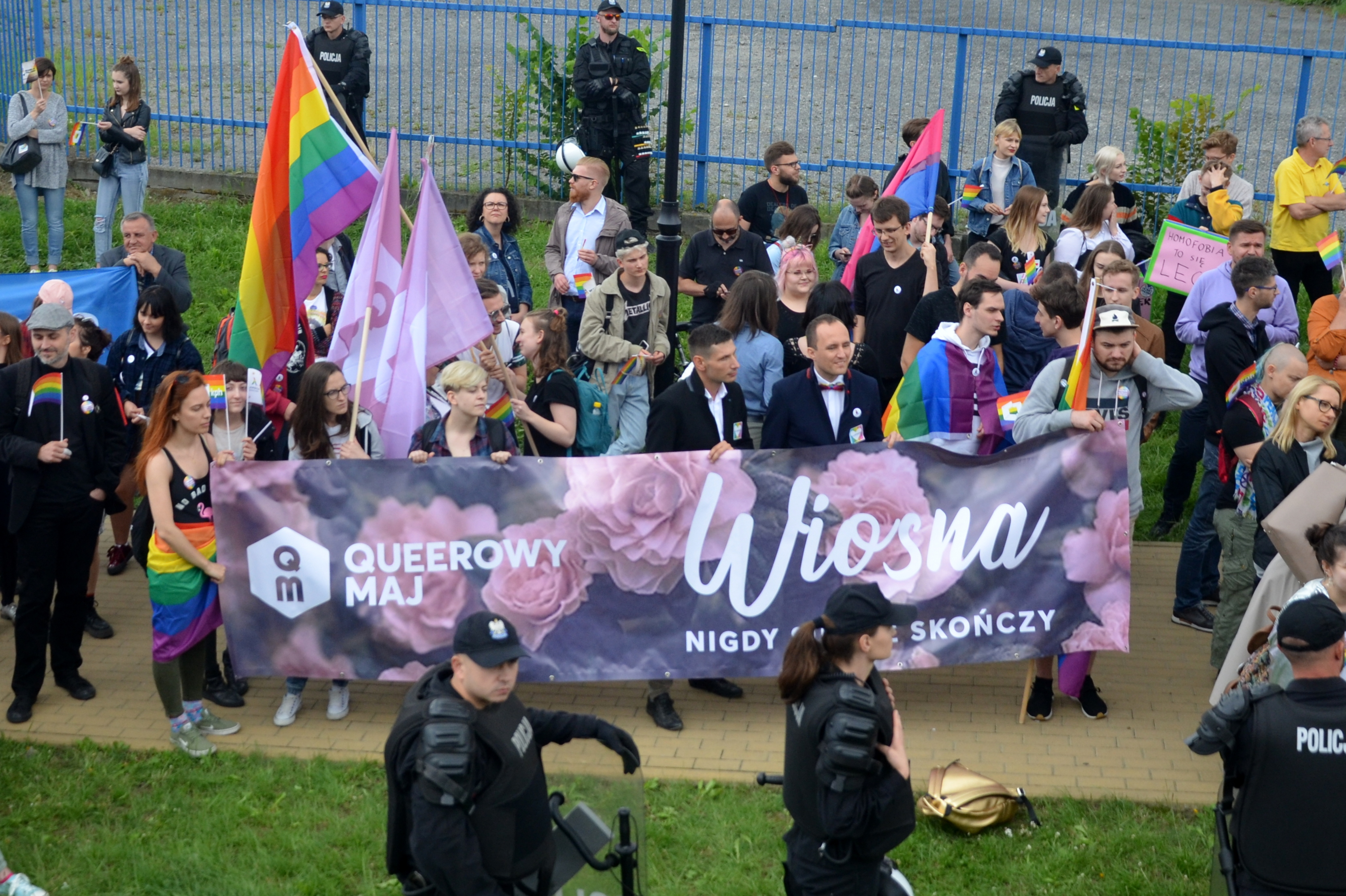
Marchers participating in the 2018 Rzeszów equality march

The equality march in Rzeszów was the first to be held in Podkarpacie Voivodeship, on 30 June 2018. About 1,000 to 1,500 people participated, including the MP Joanna Scheuring-Wielgus and the actor Omar Sangare. Clashes with nationalist counter-demonstrators from All-Polish Youth occurred during the first march, but the police intervened to separate them. There were also anti-abortion counter-demonstrators. After activists announced plans to hold the rally again in 2019, Law and Justice councillors drafted a resolution to make Rzeszów an "LGBT-free zone" and ban the event. Some 29 requests for counter-demonstrations reached city hall, which led mayor Tadeusz Ferenc, the opposition Democratic Left Alliance, to halt the march due to security concerns. The ban was overturned by a court ruling and proposed a resolution against "LGBT ideology" failed by two votes.

=== Częstochowa ===
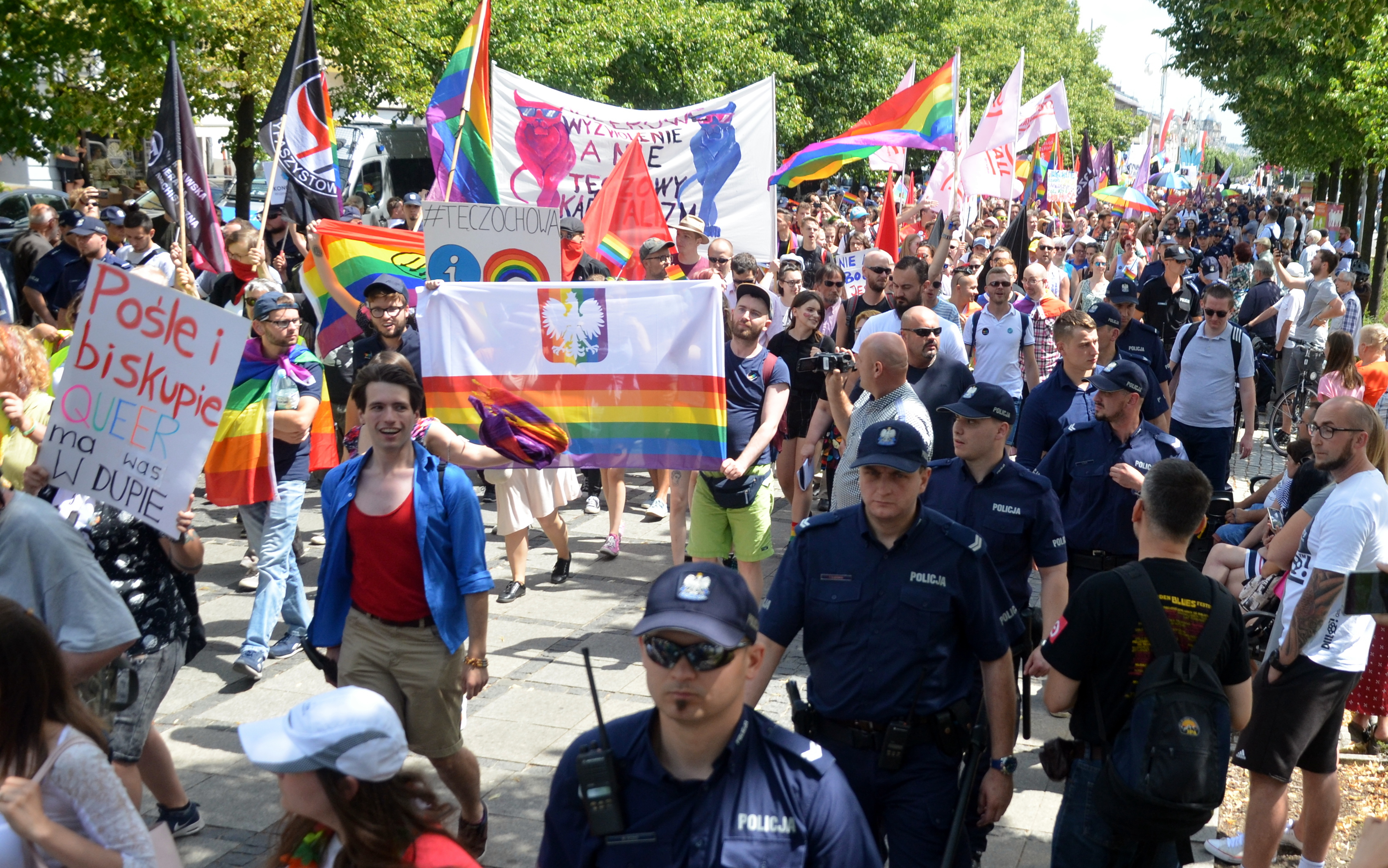
2018 equality march in Częstochowa, showing rainbow version of the Polish flag

Equality march in Częstochowa was first held in July 2018; the police intervened to prevent counter-demonstrators from blocking the route. Following the demonstration, prosecutors were notified that participants had displayed a version of the Polish flag in rainbow colors. However, they determined that no crime had been committed. Another march was held on 16 June 2019, attracting controversy due to the proximity of the Jasna Góra Monastery.

=== Lublin ===
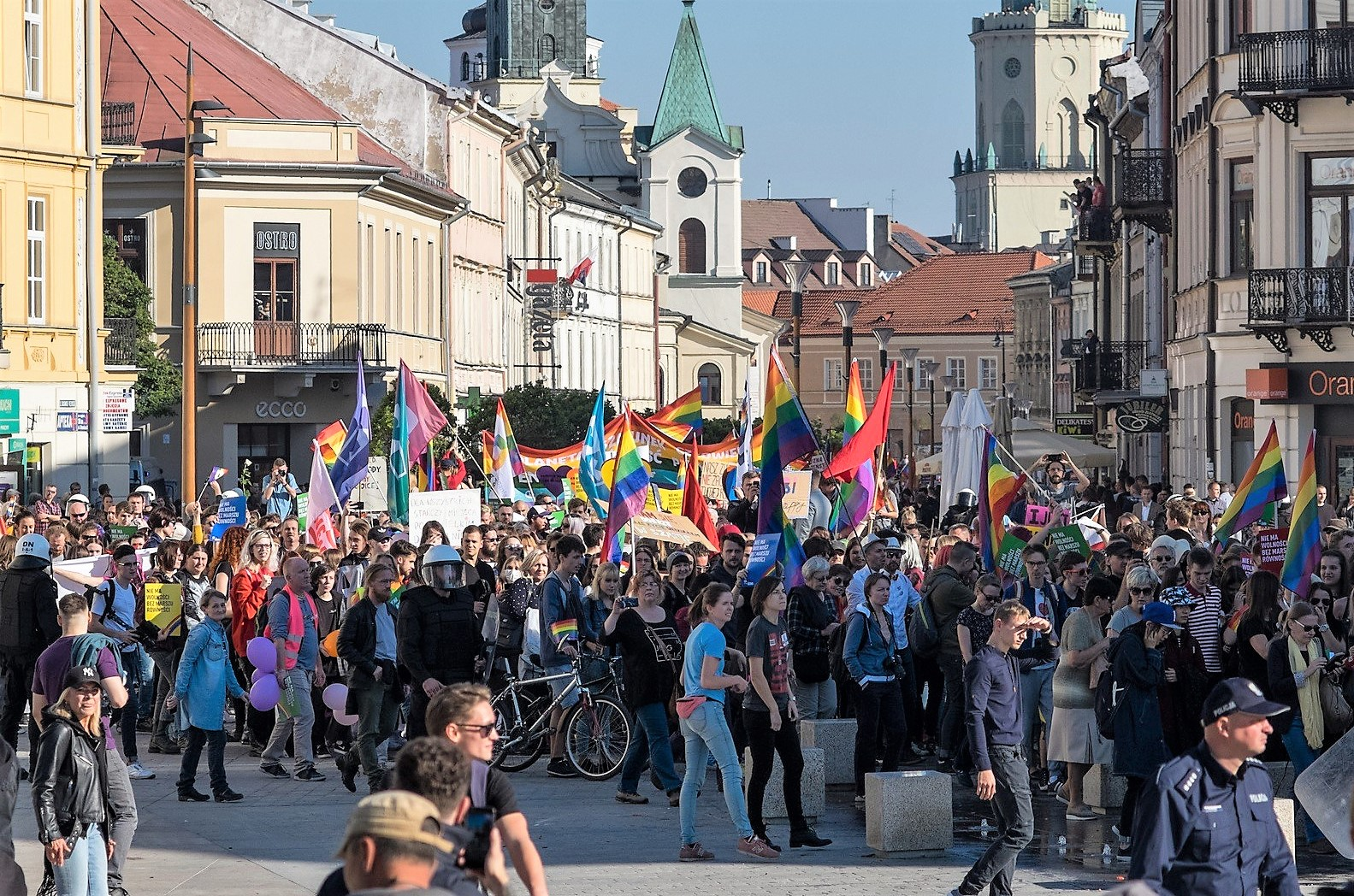
2018 Equality March in Lublin

An equality march was first held in Lublin in 2018. During the 2019 march, riot police used tear gas to disperse counter-demonstrators, some of whom attempted to throw eggs at pro-equality marchers; 25 people were arrested for attacking participants. No one was seriously harmed during the march, although organizers received death threats. A married couple arrested while protesting the march was sentenced to a year in jail each for bringing home-made explosives in their backpacks.

=== Szczecin ===
The equality march in Szczecin so far has been held in 2018 and 2019.

=== Białystok ===
Białystok Equality March was first held in 2019. More than 30 people were arrested in connection with a violent counter-demonstration.
