= Kraków Equality March =

Annual street march to oppose homophobia and sexual discrimination in Poland

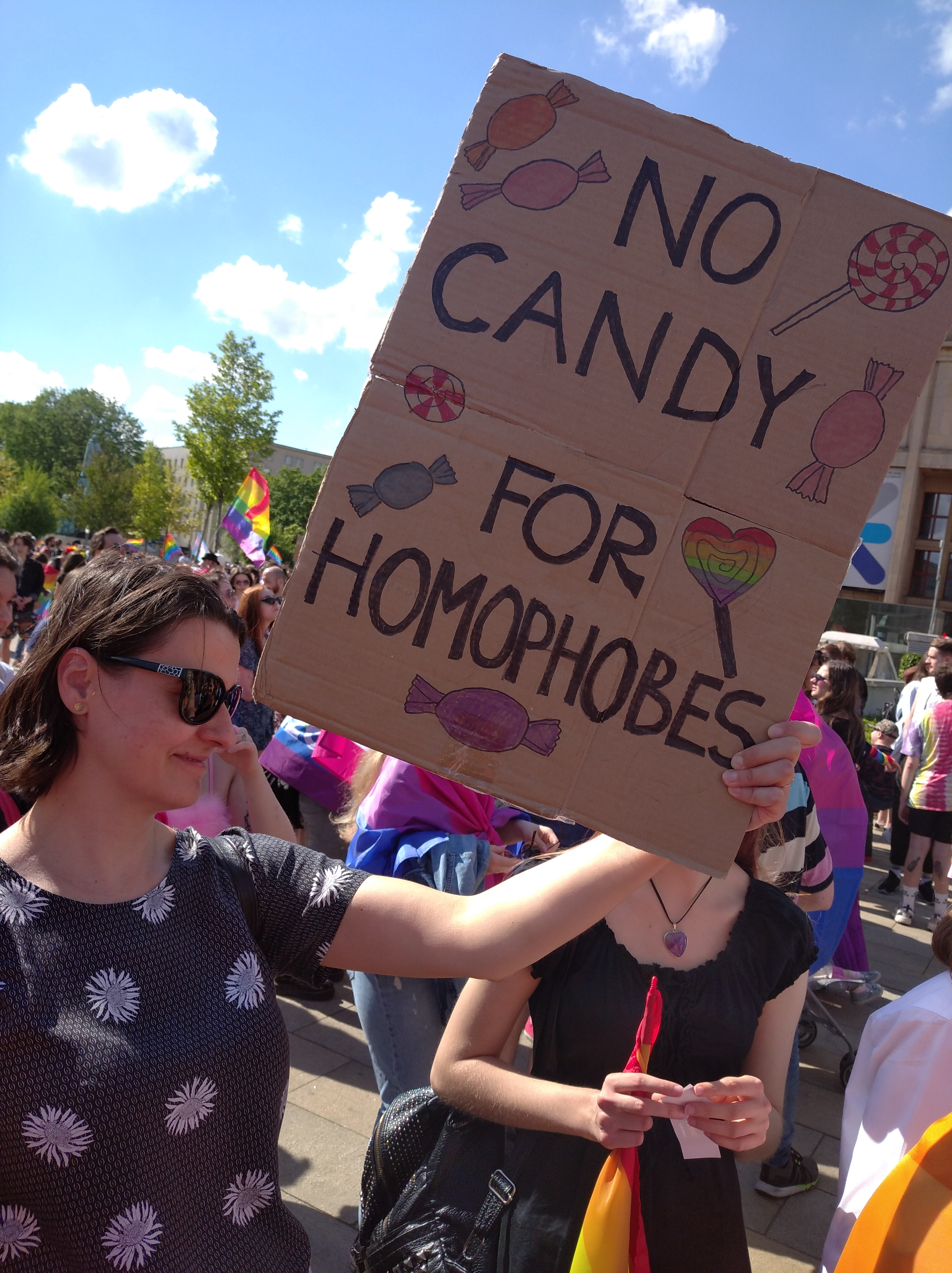
2022 Kraków Equality March

Equality March in Kraków (Polish: Marsz Równości w Krakówie), known as the Tolerance March before 2010, is an annual demonstration in Kraków, Poland, in the form of a street march of people opposed to homophobia and discrimination against sexual minorities in Poland.

Until 2009, the March of Tolerance was organized by the Culture for Tolerance Foundation (Fundacja Kultura dla Tolerancji) together with other LGBT organizations, as part of the annual Kraków Gay and Lesbian Culture Festival "Culture for Tolerance" (Kultura dla Tolerancji). The first parade took place in May 2004. About 1200 people took part in it. Since 2009, an informal organizing committee for the May Queer Festival has been organized by the LGBTQ organizations in Kraków and private individuals. Since 2010 it has been held under the Equality March in Krakow name (Marsz Równości w Krakowie).

The March of Tolerance arouses opposition from conservative circles, especially from the far-right and ultranationalist groups. It was always accompanied by a counter-meeting organized by All-Polish Youth on the same day.

== History ==
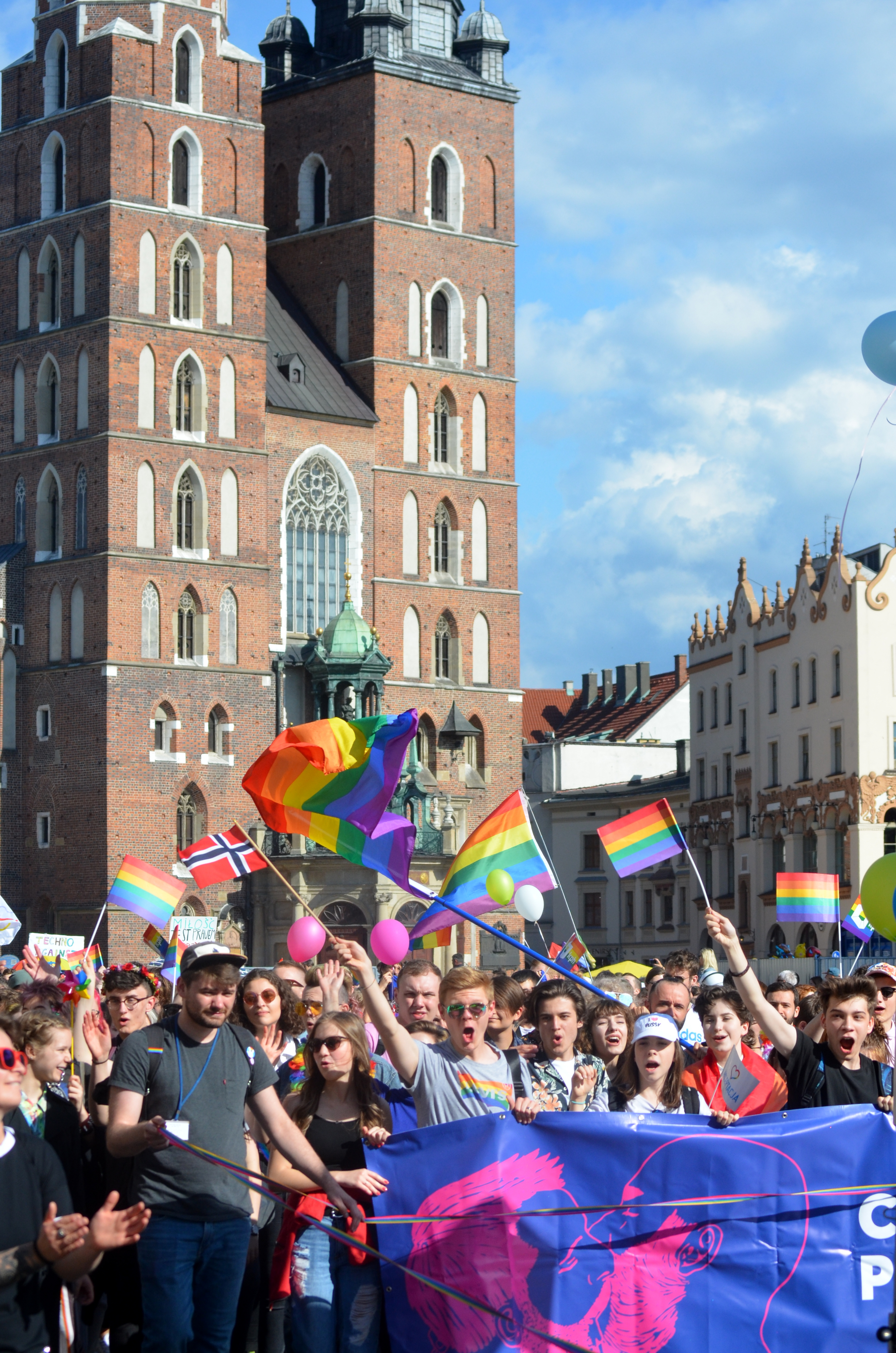
2018 Kraków Equality March

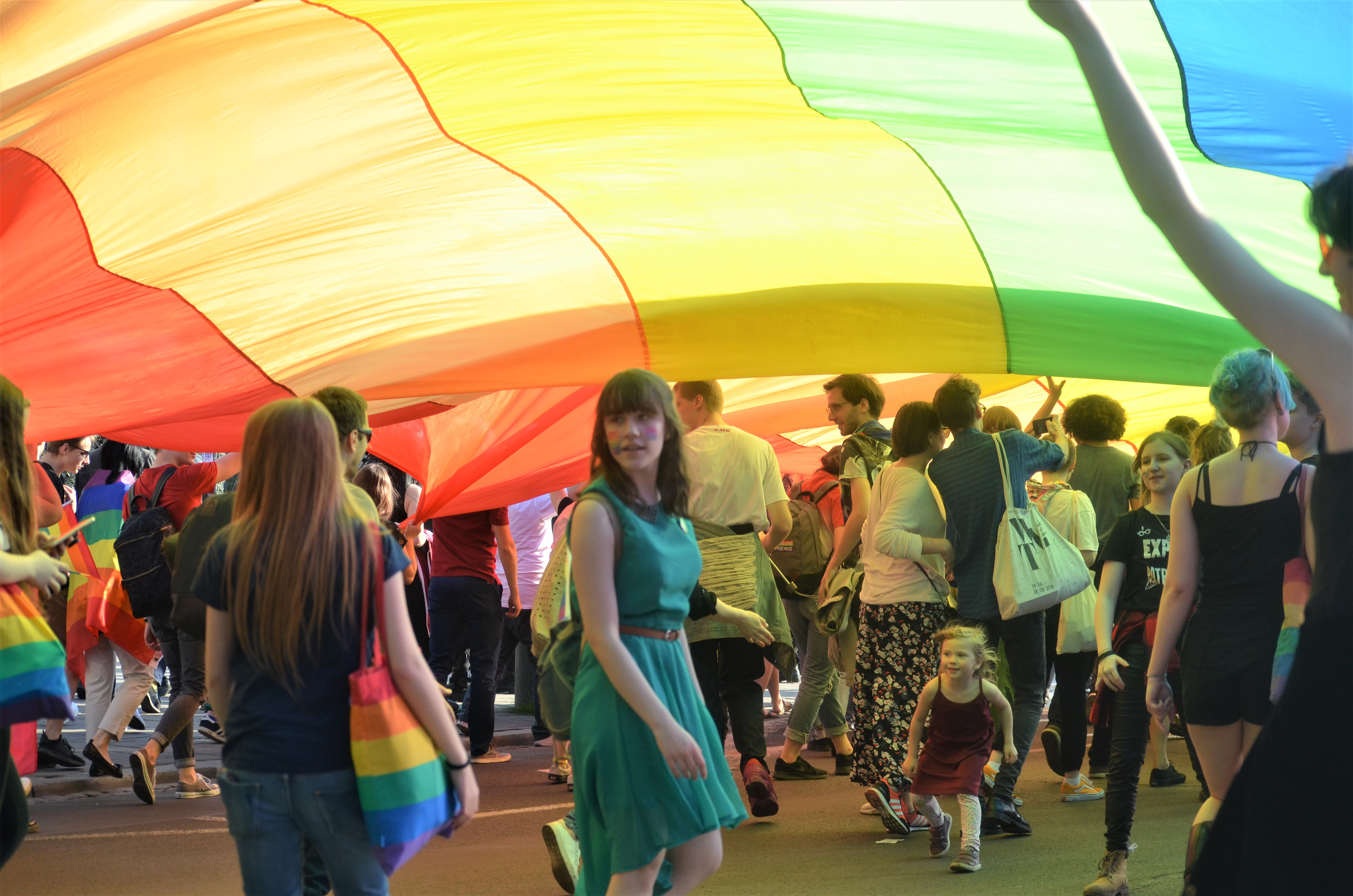
2019 Equality March

The first March of Tolerance took place on 7 May 2004. In addition to the march itself, a scientific conference organized in cooperation with the Institute of Sociology of the Jagiellonian University, a visit to the Auschwitz-Birkenau State Museum and paying tribute to homosexuals-victims of Nazism, as well as screenings of LGBT films, took place during the festival. Some right-wing and ultra-conservative organizations tried to put pressure on the rector of the University as well as on the city authorities to prevent the planned events, especially the March of Tolerance. About 1,200 people took part in the event.

In 2005, due to the death of Pope John Paul II, the organizers decided to cancel the March of Tolerance.

In 2006 the March of Tolerance took place on April 28. About 2000 people took part in the demonstration. At the same time, the All-Polish Youth organized a counter-meeting of the March of Tradition and Culture. Under the Philharmonic, the March of Tolerance was attacked by several hundred hooligans. At Wawel Castle they tried to block the march. The police detained 11 of the most aggressive hooligans, several dozen people were punished with fines. One participant of the March of Tolerance was injured by a stone hit on the head.

The Third March of Tolerance took place on 21 April 2007. According to police estimates, about 2000 people took part in it. The participants of the counter-meeting tried to disrupt the course of the March of Tolerance many times, throwing eggs at the demonstrators and erecting homophobic shouts and banners and blocking the route of the march. They also tried to tear up the rainbow flags. A total of 13 of the most aggressive participants of the counter-meeting were detained. Among them were five minors, including two 16-year-olds, who were found with pyrotechnic materials.

The Fourth March of Tolerance took place on 26 April 2008. When the March of Tolerance reached the Market Square, its participants released several hundred colorful balloons. Then eggs and bottles thrown by the counter-enthusiasts flew towards the march participants and the police. At the same time, groups of opponents chanted offensive slogans. According to police estimates, the March of Tolerance was attended by about 1,000 people (from 600 to 1,000 according to various sources), with about 400 opponents. Six people were detained (including one man for an active assault on an officer). None of the participants of the March of Tolerance was harmed. The march was condemned by the Krakow Metropolitan Curia of the Catholic Church.

The fifth March of Tolerance, for the first time separated from the Culture for Tolerance Festival, took place on May 16, 2009, as part of the newly established Queer May Festival. The next manifestation took place on Saturday 15 May 2010 under a changed name. About 400 people took part in it. In 2011, the March took place on 21 May. Other LGBT marches have progressed more peacefully.

== See also ==
- LGBT rights in Poland
