= Second Tusk cabinet =

Second Cabinet of Donald Tusk
- 16th Cabinet of Poland
- 2011–2014
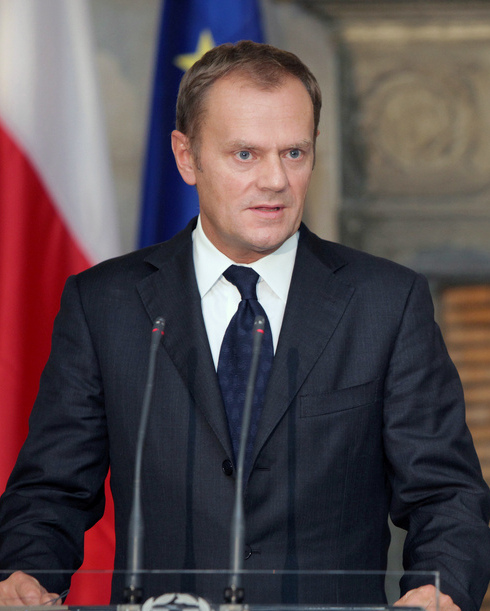
- Donald Tusk (2009)
- Date formed: 18 November 2011
- Date dissolved: 22 September 2014

People and organisations
- President: Bronisław Komorowski
- Prime Minister: Donald Tusk
- Prime Minister's history: 2007–2014, 2023–present
- Deputy Prime Minister: Waldemar Pawlak (2011-12); Jacek Rostowski (2013); Elżbieta Bieńkowska (2013-14); Janusz Piechociński (2012-14)
- Member parties: Civic Platform Polish People's Party
- Status in legislature: Majority (coalition)
- Opposition party: Law and Justice Your Movement Democratic Left Alliance
- Opposition leader: Jaroslaw Kaczyński

History
- Election: 2011 Polish parliamentary election
- Legislature term: 7th Sejm & 8th Senate
- Predecessor: Tusk I
- Successor: Kopacz

The Second Cabinet of Donald Tusk was the government of Poland from 18 November 2011 to 22 September 2014, sitting in the Council of Ministers during the 7th legislature of the Sejm and the 8th legislature of the Senate. It was appointed by President Bronisław Komorowski on 18 November 2011, and passed the vote of confidence in Sejm on 19 November 2011. Led by Donald Tusk, it is a centre-right coalition of two parties: Tusk's liberal conservative Civic Platform (PO) and the agrarian Polish People's Party (PSL). By law, all vacant ministries will be led by a Deputy Prime Minister in an acting position.

== The Cabinet ==
Office	Image	Incumbent	Party	In office
Prime Minister		Donald Tusk	PO	18 November 2011 – 22 September 2014
Deputy Prime Minister		Elżbieta Bieńkowska	PO	27 November 2013 – 22 September 2014
Deputy Prime Minister		Janusz Piechociński	PSL	6 December 2012 - 22 September 2014
Deputy Prime Minister		Jan Vincent-Rostowski	PO	25 February 2013 - 27 November 2013
Deputy Prime Minister		Waldemar Pawlak	PSL	18 November 2011 - 27 November 2012
Minister of Foreign Affairs		Radek Sikorski	PO	18 November 2011 – 22 September 2014
Minister of Interior		Jacek Cichocki	Independent	18 November 2011 – 25 February 2013
Minister of Interior		Bartłomiej Sienkiewicz	Independent	25 February 2013 – 22 September 2014
Minister of Justice		Jarosław Gowin	PO	18 November 2011 – 6 May 2013
Minister of Justice		Marek Biernacki	PO	6 May 2013 – 22 September 2014
Minister of Administration and Digitalization		Michał Boni	Independent	18 November 2011 – 27 November 2013
Minister of Administration and Digitalization		Rafał Trzaskowski	PO	3 December 2013 – 22 September 2014
Minister of Agriculture and Rural Development		Marek Sawicki	PSL	18 November 2011 – 26 July 2012; 17 March 2014 – 22 September 2014
Minister of Agriculture and Rural Development		Stanisław Kalemba	PSL	31 July 2012 – 17 March 2014
Minister of Culture and National Heritage		Bogdan Zdrojewski	PO	18 November 2011 – 17 June 2014
Minister of Culture and National Heritage		Małgorzata Omilanowska	Independent	17 June 2014 – 22 September 2014
Minister of Economy		Waldemar Pawlak	PSL	18 November 2011 – 27 November 2012
Minister of Economy		Janusz Piechociński	PSL	6 December 2012 – 22 September 2014
Minister of Environment		Marcin Korolec	Independent	18 November 2011 – 27 November 2013
Minister of Environment		Maciej Grabowski	Independent	27 November 2013 – 22 September 2014
Minister of Finance		Jan-Vincent Rostowski	PO	18 November 2011 – 27 November 2013
Minister of Finance		Mateusz Szczurek	Independent	27 November 2013 – 22 September 2014
Minister of Health		Bartosz Arłukowicz	PO	18 November 2011 – 22 September 2014
Minister of Infrastructure and Development (new office)		Elżbieta Bieńkowska	PO	27 November 2013 – 22 September 2014
Minister of Labour and Social Policy		Władysław Kosiniak-Kamysz	PSL	18 November 2011 – 22 September 2014
Minister of Defence		Tomasz Siemoniak	PO	18 November 2011 – 22 September 2014
Minister of Education		Krystyna Szumilas	PO	18 November 2011 – 27 November 2013
Minister of Education		Joanna Kluzik-Rostkowska	PO	27 November 2013 – 22 September 2014
Minister of Regional Development (abolished office)		Elżbieta Bieńkowska	PO	18 November 2011 – 27 November 2013
Minister of Science and Higher Education		Barbara Kudrycka	PO	18 November 2011 – 27 November 2013
Minister of Science and Higher Education		Lena Kolarska-Bobińska	PO	3 December 2013 – 22 September 2014
Minister of Sport and Tourism		Joanna Mucha	PO	18 November 2011 – 27 November 2013
Minister of Sport and Tourism		Andrzej Biernat	PO	27 November 2013 – 22 September 2014
Minister of the State Treasury		Mikołaj Budzanowski	Independent	18 November 2011 – 24 April 2013
Minister of the State Treasury		Włodzimierz Karpiński	PO	24 April 2013 - 22 September 2014
Minister of Transport, Construction and Marine Economy (abolished office)		Sławomir Nowak	PO	18 November 2011 – 27 November 2013
Minister without Portfolio		Tomasz Arabski	Independent	18 November 2011 – 25 February 2013
Minister without Portfolio		Jacek Cichocki	Independent	25 February 2013 – 22 September 2014

== Votes of confidence ==
Vote of confidence in the Second Cabinet of Donald Tusk
Ballot →	19 November 2011
Required majority →	224 out of 447
Votes in favour: • PO (206); • PSL (27); • Independent (1)	234 / 447
Votes against: • PiS (129); • RP (38); • SLD (25); • SP (17); • Independent (2)	211 / 447
Abstentions: • PiS (1); • RP (1)	2 / 447
Absent: • PiS (7); • RP (2); • PO (1); • PSL (1); • SLD (1); • SP (1)	13 / 460

Vote of confidence in the Second Cabinet of Donald Tusk
Ballot →	12 October 2012
Required majority →	227 out of 452
Votes in favour: • PO (205); • PSL (27); • Independent (1)	233 / 452
Votes against: • PiS (133); • RP (42); • SLD (24); • SP (19); • Independent (1)	219 / 452
Absent: • PiS (3); • RP (1); • PO (1); • PSL (1); • SLD (1); • Independent (1)	8 / 460

Vote of confidence in the Second Cabinet of Donald Tusk
Ballot →	25 June 2014
Required majority →	221 out of 440
Votes in favour: • PO (201); • PSL (31); • Independent (4); • RP (1)	237 / 440
Votes against: • PiS (127); • RP (32); • SLD (23); • SP (11); • Independent (10)	203 / 440
Absent: • PiS (10); • RP (3); • SLD (3); • PO (2); • PSL (1); • SP (1)	20 / 460
