= Sławomir Nitras =

Polish politician, political scientist (born 1973)

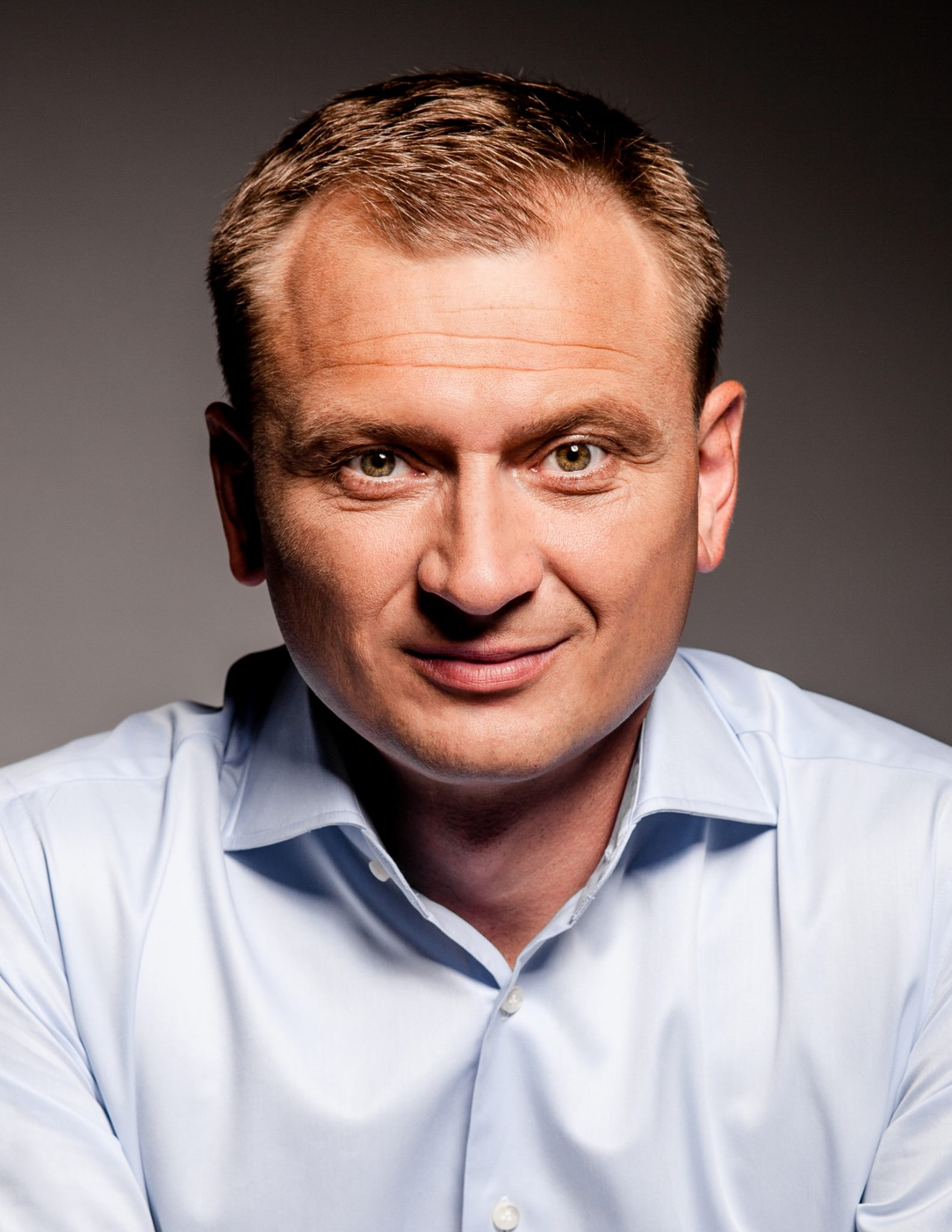
- Nitras in 2015

Minister of Sport and Tourism
- In office 13 December 2023 – 24 July 2025
- Prime Minister: Donald Tusk
- Preceded by: Danuta Dmowska-Andrzejuk
- Succeeded by: Jakub Rutnicki

Member of the Sejm
- Incumbent
- Assumed office 12 November 2015
- In office 26 October 2005 – 13 July 2009

Member of the European Parliament
- In office 14 July 2009 – 1 July 2014

Personal details
- Born: 26 April 1973 (age 52) Połczyn-Zdrój, Poland
- Party: Civic Platform (2001–present)
- Other political affiliations: Real Politics Union (1991–1995); Conservative People's Party (1997–2001)

Sławomir Witold Nitras (Polish pronunciation: [swaˈvɔmir ˈvitɔlt ˈɲitras]; born 26 April 1973) is a Polish politician, political scientist, member of Civic Platform (PO) and a member of the Sejm since 2015. He served as Minister of Sport and Tourism from 2023 to 2025.

== Biography ==
He was educated at the University of Szczecin, graduating in 1998 in Political Science from the Faculty of Humanities. From 1997 to 1998 he was employed as a lecturer at the Institute of Philosophy and Political Science at the University of Szczecin.

From 1998 to 1999 he was manager of the Koszalin voivodeship Governor's office, and in 1999 - 2002 sat on the Board of the Kruszywa Koszalin PLC mines. He spent the following three years running his own business.

From 1998 to 2002 he was a Solidarity Election Action (AWS) councillor in the Western Pomeranian voivodeship sejmik. He was elected a Civic Platform (PO) MP for Szczecin in the 2005 elections getting 14238 votes in 41 Szczecin district and 2007 parliamentary elections, gaining 65,993 votes (the highest individual number of votes in the constituency since 1989). During both terms in office he was a member of the Treasury Committee and in his second term he was also a member of the Economy Committee and the Accessible Government Extraordinary Committee.

He was elected to the European Parliament in 2009 for the Gorzów constituency, with 107,413 votes. He sits with the Group of the European People's Party (Christian Democrats) and is also a member of the Committee on Economic and Monetary Affairs and of the delegation to the EU-Russia Parliamentary Cooperation Committee. In 2014 he didn't seek re-election. On the 2 December in the same year he became the main adviser in political cabinet of Prime Minister Ewa Kopacz. In the 2015 parliamentary election he became Member of Polish Parliament by 20 930 votes. He is the chairman of the delegation of the Sejm and Senate of Poland to the Parliamentary Assembly of the OSCE. In 2019 parliamentary election he was reelected as a member of the Sejm with 78 513 votes. He ran for reelection once again in the 2023 parliamentary election and was subsequently reelected, receiving 90,720 votes. On July 23, 2025 he was dismissed from his post as Minister of Sport and Tourism by Prime Minister Donald Tusk in a reshuffle of the cabinet. From 1991 to 1993 he was a member of the Real Politics Union, and from 1996 to 2001 belonged to the Conservative People's Party. Since 2001 he has been a member of Civic Platform (PO) and is a member of the National Executive. Since 2003 he has been the leader of PO in Szczecin, and since 2006 vice-chairman of the PO Regional Executive in Western Pomerania.

== Personal life ==
He is married to Irmina and has two daughters, Natalia and Kornelia.

== See also ==
- List of Sejm members (2005–2007)
- List of Sejm members (2007–2011)
- Third Cabinet of Donald Tusk
