= Kopacz cabinet =

Government of Poland, 2014–2015

Cabinet of Ewa Kopacz
- 17th Cabinet of Poland
- 2014–2015
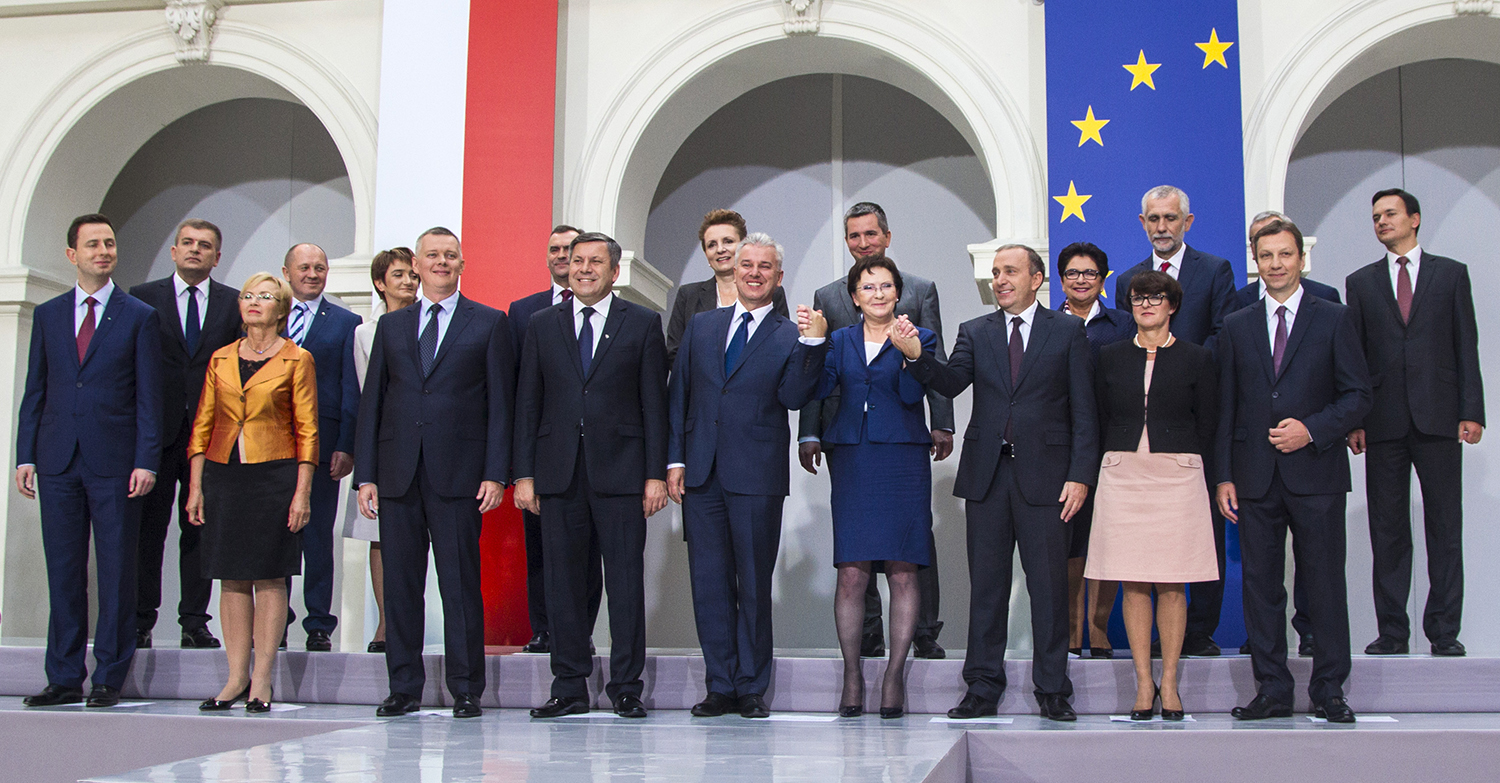
- Presentation of candidates for ministers in Ewa Kopacz's government (2014)
- Date formed: 22 September 2014
- Date dissolved: 16 November 2015

People and organisations
- Head of state: Bronisław Komorowski; Andrzej Duda
- Head of government: Ewa Kopacz
- Deputy head of government: Tomasz Siemoniak; Janusz Piechociński
- Member parties: Civic Platform Polish People's Party
- Status in legislature: Majority (coalition)
- Opposition party: Law and Justice Your Movement (confidence in 2014) Democratic Left Alliance
- Opposition leader: Jaroslaw Kaczyński

History
- Election: 2011 Polish parliamentary election
- Predecessor: Tusk II
- Successor: Szydło

Cabinet of Ewa Kopacz was the government of Poland from 22 September 2014 to 16 November 2015. It was appointed by President Bronisław Komorowski on 22 September 2014, and passed a vote of confidence in Sejm on 1 October 2014. Led by Ewa Kopacz, it is a centre-right coalition of two parties: liberal conservative Civic Platform (PO) and the agrarian Polish People's Party (PSL). Ewa Kopacz succeeded Donald Tusk, who was nominated as President of the European Council.

== Cabinet ==
Office	Image	Name	Party	from	to
Prime Minister		Ewa Kopacz	Civic Platform	22 September 2014	16 November 2015
Deputy Prime Minister, Minister of Economy		Janusz Piechociński	Polish People's Party	22 September 2014	16 November 2015
Deputy Prime Minister, Minister of National Defence		Tomasz Siemoniak	Civic Platform	22 September 2014	16 November 2015
Minister of Administration and Digitization		Andrzej Halicki	Civic Platform	22 September 2014	16 November 2015
Minister of Agriculture and Rural Development		Marek Sawicki	Polish People's Party	22 September 2014	16 November 2015
Minister of Culture and National Heritage		Małgorzata Omilanowska	Independent	22 September 2014	16 November 2015
Minister of Environment		Maciej Grabowski	Independent	22 September 2014	16 November 2015
Minister of Finance		Mateusz Szczurek	Independent	22 September 2014	16 November 2015
Minister of Foreign Affairs		Grzegorz Schetyna	Civic Platform	22 September 2014	16 November 2015
Minister of Health		Bartosz Arłukowicz	Civic Platform	22 September 2014	16 June 2015
Minister of Health		Marian Zembala	Independent	16 June 2015	16 November 2015
Minister of Infrastructure and Development		Maria Wasiak	Independent	22 September 2014	16 November 2015
Minister of Interior		Teresa Piotrowska	Civic Platform	22 September 2014	16 November 2015
Minister of Justice		Cezary Grabarczyk	Civic Platform	22 September 2014	4 May 2015
Minister of Justice		Borys Budka	Civic Platform	4 May 2015	16 November 2015
Minister of Labour and Social Policy		Władysław Kosiniak-Kamysz	Polish People's Party	22 September 2014	16 November 2015
Minister of National Education		Joanna Kluzik-Rostkowska	Civic Platform	22 September 2014	16 November 2015
Minister of Science and Higher Education		Lena Kolarska-Bobińska	Civic Platform	22 September 2014	16 November 2015
Minister of Sport and Tourism		Andrzej Biernat	Civic Platform	22 September 2014	16 June 2015
Minister of Sport and Tourism		Adam Korol	Independent	16 June 2015	16 November 2015
Minister of State Treasury		Włodzimierz Karpiński	Civic Platform	22 September 2014	16 June 2015
Minister of State Treasury		Andrzej Czerwiński	Civic Platform	16 June 2015	16 November 2015
Chief of the Chancellery		Jacek Cichocki	Independent	22 September 2014	16 November 2015

== Vote of confidence ==
Vote of confidence in the Cabinet of Ewa Kopacz
Ballot →	1 October 2014
Required majority →	225 out of 442
Votes in favour: • PO (200); • PSL (32); • Independent (14); • RP (13)	259 / 442
Votes against: • PiS (133); • SLD (29); • SP (14); • Independents (7)	183 / 442
Abstentions: • Independents (7)	7 / 442
Absent: • SLD (2); • PiS (2); • PO (2); • RP (2); • SP (1); • Independents (2)	11 / 442
