= Teresa Piotrowska =

Polish politician (born 1955)

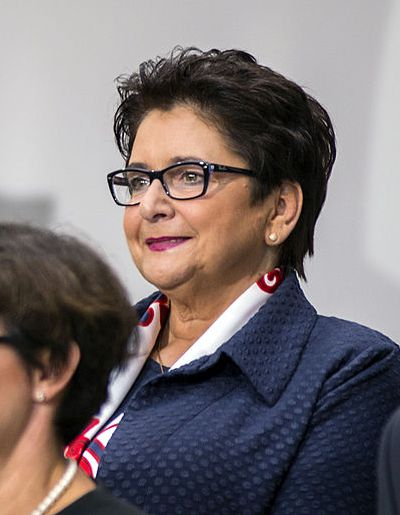

Minister of the Interior
- In office 22 September 2014 – 16 November 2015
- Prime Minister: Ewa Kopacz
- Preceded by: Bartłomiej Sienkiewicz
- Succeeded by: Mariusz Błaszczak (as Minister of Interior and Administration)

Member of the Sejm
- In office 19 October 2001 – 11 November 2019
- Constituency: 4 Bydgoszcz

Personal details
- Born: 5 February 1955 (age 71) Tczew, Polish People's Republic
- Party: Civic Platform
- Education: Cardinal Stefan Wyszyński University

Teresa Piotrowska (born 5 February 1955) is a Polish politician. She was elected to the Sejm on 25 September 2005, getting 16,716 votes in 4 Bydgoszcz district, as a candidate from the Civic Platform list.

== Early life ==
Piotrowska was born in Tczew on 5 February 1955. During her youth she attended the Maria Skłodowska-Curie High School in Tczew and later in 1980 attended the Cardinal Stefan Wyszyński University in Warsaw graduating with a master's degree in history.

She was then later a member of the PAX Association which was a Catholic pro-communist group in Poland and became an instructor in this group, later in the 1990s she worked as a primary school teacher.

== Political career ==
She became a member of the city council of Bydgoszcz in 1994 and later from 1995 to 1998 as a member of the city board where she was tasked with overseeing social welfare and education.

She then served as the last Voiovode of Bydgoszcz from March 1998 to December 1998 after which the voivodeship was integrated into the Kuyavian–Pomeranian Voivodeship.

Piotrowska was also a Member of the Sejm being first elected in the 2001 election. She was elected in Sejm Constituency no. 4 with 12,196 votes totalling 3.54% of the total votes in the constituency.

Piotrowska became the Minister of the Interior of Poland on 22 September 2014 in the Ewa Kopacz Cabinet. She held on to this position of Minister of the Interior for 1 year and 1 month until she lost her position as minister due to the government losing the 2015 Polish parliamentary election, she was succeeded by Mariusz Błaszczak.

== See also ==
- Members of Polish Sejm 2005-2007
- Cabinet of Ewa Kopacz
