= Parties in the European Council during 2015 =

This article describes the party affiliations of leaders of each member state represented in the European Council during the year 2015. The list below gives the political party that each head of government, or head of state, belongs to at the national level, as well as the European political alliance to which that national party belongs. The states are listed from most to least populous. More populous states have greater influence in the council, in accordance with the qualified majority system.

== Summary ==
| Party | 1 January 2015 | | 26 January | | 16 November | | 26 November | |
| Party | # | Pop.% | # | Pop.% | # | Pop.% | # | Pop.% |
|---|---|---|---|---|---|---|---|---|
| European People's Party | 12 | 46.58% | 11 | 44.45% | 10 | 36.97% | 9 | 34.93% |
| Party of European Socialists | 9 | 33.79% | 9 | 33.79% | 9 | 33.79% | 10 | 35.83% |
| Alliance of Liberals and Democrats for Europe Party | 5 | 6.33% | 5 | 6.33% | 5 | 6.33% | 5 | 6.33% |
| Alliance of European Conservatives and Reformists | 1 | 12.74% | 1 | 12.74% | 2 | 20.22% | 2 | 20.22% |
| Party of the European Left | 0 | 0.00% | 1 | 2.13% | 1 | 2.13% | 1 | 2.13% |
| Independent | 1 | 0.57% | 1 | 0.57% | 1 | 0.57% | 1 | 0.57% |

== List of leaders (1 January 2015) ==
| Member state | Pop.% | Leader | Party |
|---|---|---|---|
| Germany | 15.97% | Angela Merkel | CDU-EPP |
| France | 13.06% | François Hollande | PS-PES |
| United Kingdom | 12.74% | David Cameron | Con-AECR |
| Italy | 11.96% | Matteo Renzi | PD-PES |
| Spain | 9.14% | Mariano Rajoy | PP-EPP |
| Poland | 7.48% | Ewa Kopacz | PO-EPP |
| Romania | 3.91% | Klaus Iohannis | Ind. (Note: Supported by PNL)-EPP |
| Netherlands | 3.33% | Mark Rutte | VVD-ALDE |
| Belgium | 2.22% | Charles Michel | MR-ALDE |
| Greece | 2.13% | Antonis Samaras | ND-EPP |
| Czech Republic | 2.07% | Bohuslav Sobotka | ČSSD-PES |
| Portugal | 2.04% | Pedro Passos Coelho | PPD/PSD-EPP |
| Hungary | 1.94% | Viktor Orbán | Fidesz-EPP |
| Sweden | 1.92% | Stefan Löfven | S-PES |
| Austria | 1.69% | Werner Faymann | SPÖ-PES |
| Bulgaria | 1.42% | Boyko Borisov | GERB-EPP |
| Denmark | 1.11% | Helle Thorning-Schmidt | A-PES |
| Finland | 1.08% | Alexander Stubb | Kok.-EPP |
| Slovakia | 1.07% | Robert Fico | SMER-SD-PES |
| Ireland | 0.91% | Enda Kenny | FG-EPP |
| Croatia | 0.83% | Zoran Milanović | SDP-PES |
| Lithuania | 0.57% | Dalia Grybauskaitė | Ind. |
| Slovenia | 0.41% | Miro Cerar | SMC-ALDE |
| Latvia | 0.39% | Laimdota Straujuma | V-EPP |
| Estonia | 0.26% | Taavi Rõivas | RE-ALDE |
| Cyprus | 0.17% | Nicos Anastasiades | DISY-EPP |
| Luxembourg | 0.11% | Xavier Bettel | DP-ALDE |
| Malta | 0.08% | Joseph Muscat | PL-EPP |

== Changes ==
| Date | State | Former | | Newer | |
| Date | State | Leader | Party | Leader | Party |
|---|---|---|---|---|---|
| 26 January | Greece | Antonis Samaras | ND-EPP | Alexis Tsipras | SYRIZA-PEL |
| 16 November | Poland | Ewa Kopacz | PO-EPP | Beata Szydło | PiS-EACR |
| 26 November | Portugal | Pedro Passos Coelho | PSD-EPP | António Costa | PS-PES |

== See also ==
- Presidency of the Council of the European Union
