= Polish Karate Federation =

Association of karate clubs

- Abbreviation: PZK
- Formation: January 20, 1980
- Type: Federation
- Legal status: A public organization, approved by the Cabinet of Poland
- Purpose: Bringing unified order to Karate and development of karate as a sport in Poland
- Headquarters: al. Jerozolimskie 30, 00-024, Warsaw, Poland
- Region served: Poland
- Official language: Polish
- Leader: Maciej Sokolowski, Chairman
- Website: Official Website

Polish Karate Federation (PZK, pol. Polski Związek Karate) is a Polish organization associating among others shōtōkan karate clubs. It belongs to the World Karate Federation committee.

== Olympic Karate ==
In 2016, the International Olympic Committee adopted a resolution on karate as the thirtieth Olympic discipline to perform at the 2020 Summer Olympics in Tokyo. The Polish Olympic Committee granted legal membership for the Polish Karate Association. According to the decision of the Ministry of Sport and Tourism in Poland, PZK is the only organization that can represent and use Polish national symbols when participating in foreign competitions.

== Operation ==
PZK issues competition, coaching and referee licenses. The union is subject to five committees: technical-qualified sport, judges, children and youth, mass sports events and sport of disabled people. Commissions are subject to regulations and are appointed by PZK management. The organization's goal is to promote and educate karate in Poland.

== Structure ==
The association, as of March 2014, associates 197 kyokushin clubs, shōtōkan clubs and 11 district associations. The Federation's governing bodies are:

- General Meeting
- Committee
- Revision Committee

In accordance with the status, §18 1: The term of office of the Federation's authorities lasts 4 years, and their election takes place in an open or secret voting, depending on the resolution of the General Meeting.

Management Polish Karate Federation The term of office 2018-2022
President	Maciej Sokołowski
Vice president	Wacław Antoniak
Vice president	Andrzej Drewniak
Vice president	Janusz Piepiora
Secretary-General	Jacek Czerniec
Committee member	Dariusz Bajkowski
Committee member	Eugeniusz Dadzibug
Committee member	Piotr Pobłocki
Committee member	Remingiusz Powroźnik
Committee member	Mariusz SIebert
Committee member	Edward Urbańczyk
Committee member	Grzegorz Żendzian

The audit committee
Chairman	Jerzy Urban
Vice-chairman	Witold Stolarczyk
Committee member	Waldemar Kozioł
Committee member	Krzysztof Minoga
Committee member	Jacek Rusek

== See also ==
- Official Website for members
- Official Website for public
- Website of PZK Kyokushin (a group cooperating with PZK)
- Polish Organistation of Kyokushinkai
- World Karate Federation
