= Witold Bańka =

Polish sprinter and politician

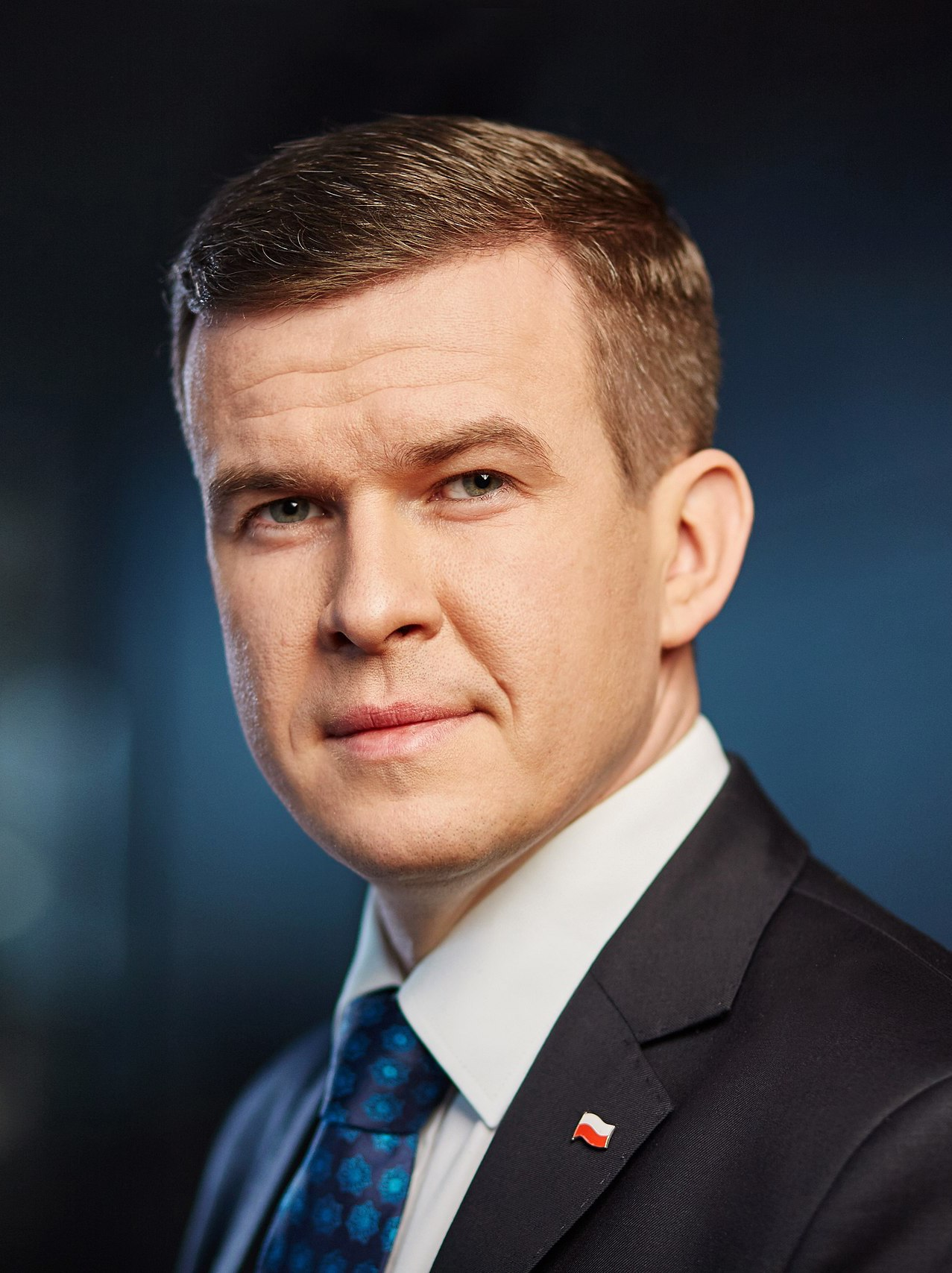
- Bańka in 2018

4th President of WADA
- Incumbent
- Assumed office 1 January 2020
- Vice President: Yang Yang
- Preceded by: Craig Reedie

Minister of Sport and Tourism
- In office 16 November 2015 – 15 November 2019
- Prime Minister: Beata Szydło; Mateusz Morawiecki
- Preceded by: Adam Korol
- Succeeded by: Mateusz Morawiecki

Personal details
- Born: 3 October 1984 (age 41) Tychy, Poland
- Party: Law and Justice
- Education: University of Silesia in Katowice
- Profession: Sprinter; Political scientist

Witold Bańka (Polish pronunciation: [ˈvitɔld ˈbaj̃ka]; born 3 October 1984) is a Polish former 400 metres sprinter turned politician. Since 2015, he served as Minister of Sport and Tourism in the cabinet of Beata Szydło and cabinet of Mateusz Morawiecki. In May 2019, he was elected President of the World Anti-Doping Agency (WADA).

== Athletic career ==
Bańka's biggest achievement as an athlete was the bronze medal in the 4 × 400 metres relay at the 2007 World Championships although he only competed in the heats. He also won several relay medals at lower level competitions. He retired from professional sport in 2012 having failed to qualify for the 2012 Summer Olympics.

=== Personal bests ===
Outdoor

- 200 metres – 21.83 (+1.5 m/s, Bielsko-Biała 2006)
- 400 metres – 46.11 (Osaka 2007)

Indoor

- 400 metres – 48.87 (Spała 2009)

=== Competition record ===
Year	Competition	Venue	Position	Event	Notes
Representing Poland
2005	European U23 Championships	Erfurt, Germany	1st	4 × 400 m relay	3:04.41
2007	Universiade	Bangkok, Thailand	1st	4 × 400 m relay	3:02.05
2007	World Championships	Osaka, Japan	3rd (heats)	4 × 400 m relay	3:02.39^{1}
2009	Universiade	Belgrade, Serbia	2nd	4 × 400 m relay	3:05.69

^{1}He was not selected for the final where the Polish team finished third but also received a bronze medal.

== Political career ==
In 2018 he became a candidate for the chair of the World Anti-Doping Agency. In May 2019 Bańka was elected as WADA's fourth president, commencing his four-year term on 1 January 2020. He was re-elected in 2022 for another three year term.

=== Activities as President of WADA ===
During Witold Bańka’s presidency of the World Anti-Doping Agency (WADA), the organisation placed increased emphasis on long-term financial sustainability and diversification of funding sources. Between 2019 and 2025, WADA’s annual budget increased from approximately USD 37 million to over USD 57 million, representing a rise of more than 50%.

The development of cooperation with the private sector was one of the key elements of Witold Bańka’s programme presented prior to his election as President of WADA. Under his tenure, WADA introduced a framework for structured partnerships with private-sector entities, a model that had not previously formed part of the agency’s funding approach. Within this framework, in 2024, WADA signed a five-year partnership agreement with Sword Group, making the technology company the agency’s first global private partner. As part of the same initiative, WADA also concluded a sponsorship agreement with the Africa-based broadcaster SuperSport, under which SuperSport became the agency’s first continental sponsor, providing financial and in-kind support to promote clean sport awareness and values-based education programmes across Africa.

=== Governance Reforms ===
Under Witold Bańka’s presidency, governance reforms were advanced within the World Anti-Doping Agency, including the adoption of a Code of Ethics, the establishment of an Independent Ethics Board, and the restructuring and renaming of the WADA Athletes’ Council. These reforms also resulted in changes to the composition of the WADA Board and Executive Committee, aimed at enhancing the representation of athletes and National Anti-Doping Organizations (NADOs) within the agency’s key decision-making bodies, an objective that Bańka repeatedly highlighted as a priority in his public statements and speeches.

=== Athlete representation and rights ===
As part of efforts to orient the World Anti-Doping Agency toward a more athlete-centred approach, Witold Bańka supported the establishment of an independent Athletes’ Anti-Doping Ombuds, a role created to advocate for athletes’ rights and address concerns related to the anti-doping system. The concept of appointing an Athletes’ Anti-Doping Ombuds had already been outlined in Bańka’s programme during his candidacy for the presidency of WADA, where he emphasised the need to strengthen independent mechanisms for athlete representation and protection.

=== Education related activities ===
Under Witold Bańka’s presidency, the role of education within the World Anti-Doping Agency was strengthened through a series of structural and strategic initiatives. In his public statements and speeches, Bańka repeatedly emphasised that the development of education should serve as a central pillar of the anti-doping system. A stand-alone Education Department was established, and the Social Science Research Strategy (2020–2024) was adopted, with the stated objective of investing in social science research to improve understanding of behaviours related to clean sport and doping. During the same period, the agency also developed the Global Learning and Development Framework (GLDF) to support WADA’s commitment to professionalising the anti-doping workforce.

=== Global Anti-Doping Intelligence and Investigations Network (GAIIN) ===
Witold Bańka was actively involved in securing the World Anti-Doping Agency’s first-ever grant from the European Union, for a pilot project aimed at strengthening the intelligence and investigative capabilities of Anti-Doping Organizations across Europe.

The European phase of the project contributed to the development of intelligence and investigative capacity in 48 countries and led to the initiation of more than 100 coordinated operations involving law-enforcement authorities and National Anti-Doping Organizations. These operations resulted in the dismantling of 25 illicit laboratories and the seizure of approximately 25 tonnes of performance-enhancing drugs, estimated at around 500 million doses. The outcomes of the European project informed subsequent efforts to establish a Global Anti-Doping Intelligence and Investigations Network (GAIIN).

=== World Anti-Doping Code update process ===
Under Witold Bańka’s presidency, the 2027 World Anti-Doping Code and International Standards Update Process was carried out and concluded with its approval at the World Conference on Doping in Sport, held in Busan, Republic of Korea, in December 2025.

=== Chinese swimmers doping allegations ===
On 20 April 2024, The New York Times revealed that 23 members of the Chinese swimming team tested positive for a performance-enhancing drug called Trimetazidine seven months prior to the start of the 2020 Summer Games and were allowed to participate in the games with some of the swimmers winning medals. Following the publication of the report, Travis Tygart, CEO of the United States Anti-Doping Agency, accused the World Anti-Doping Agency (WADA) and the China Anti-Doping Agency (CHINADA) of covering up doping by Chinese swimmers.

WADA argued the amount detected was too low to enhance performance. CHINADA, who had reported the results to WADA and FINA (now World Aquatics), blamed them on contamination from a hotel kitchen, a rationale that potentially exempts findings from being made public. WADA released a statement, explaining that "[it] was not possible for WADA scientists or investigators to conduct their enquiries on the ground in China given the extreme restrictions in place due to a COVID-related lockdown. WADA ultimately concluded that it was not in a position to disprove the possibility that contamination was the source of TMZ and it was compatible with the analytical data in the file." World Aquatics's investigation agreed with WADA.

After the story was leaked, WADA was criticised by the United States Anti-Doping Agency (USADA) and athletes. WADA's choice of a Swiss attorney to lead an investigation into the matter also drew criticism because he was hand-picked by the agency. Experts interviewed by The New York Times said trace amounts of TMZ can be detected near the end of a doping excretion period but could not rule out contamination either.

In a second statement, Tygart accused both WADA and the CHINADA of not being transparent about the findings and keeping "clean athletes in the dark". WADA was also accused of having a double-standard as Russian figure skater Kamila Valieva tested positive for TMZ and used the same excuse, but was subsequently banned for four years. WADA argued, based on non-published information and pharmacokinetics, that contamination would not have been possible in Valieva's case, but in the case of the Chinese swimmers, that no international competition was occurring around the time of the positive tests, only athletes who stayed at one of the hotels tested positive, and some individuals alternated between positive and negative results all point to contamination, not doping. In May 2024, WADA announced that it will hold an extraordinary meeting to discuss the doping case of the Chinese swimmers.

Eleven of the 23 swimmers involved in the controversy were named to the 2024 Chinese Olympic swimming team.

== See also ==
- Sport in Poland
- Politics of Poland
- List of Poles

Political offices
Preceded by Adam Korol	Minister of Sports and Tourism in Poland; 2015–2019	Succeeded by Mateusz Morawiecki
