= Witold Pahl =

Polish politician (born 1961)

Witold Pahl MEP
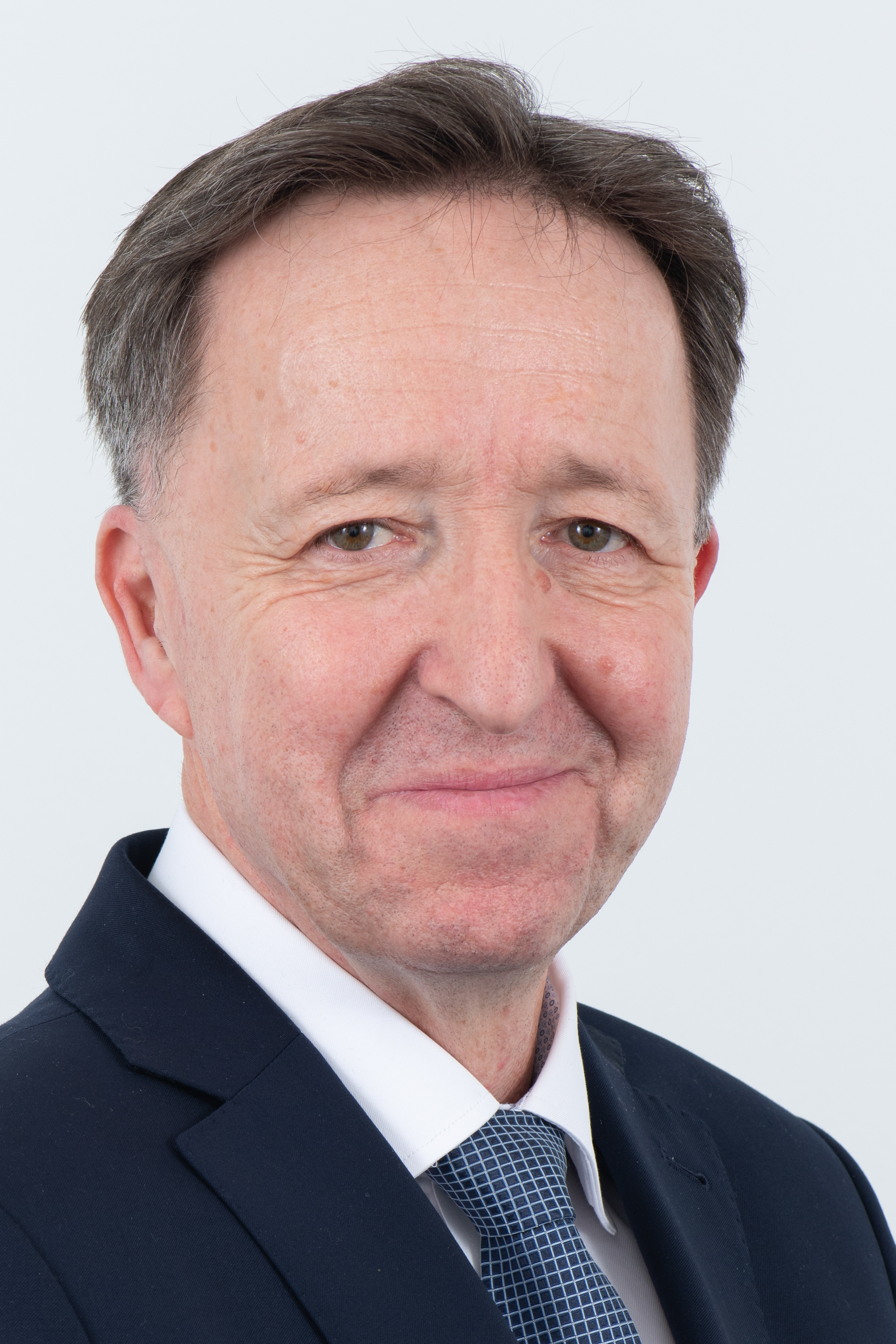

Member of the European Parliament for Lubusz and West Pomeranian
- Incumbent
- Assumed office 16 November 2023
- Preceded by: Bartosz Arłukowicz

Personal details
- Born: 7 December 1961 (age 64) Wrocław, Poland
- Party: Civic Platform (Poland)

Witold Pahl (born 7 December 1961) is a Polish politician from the Civic Platform.

== Career ==
Witold Pahl studied law at the Adam Mickiewicz University in Poznań. He worked at the district court in Słubice and Gorzów Wielkopolski. In 2006 he became a member of the Gorzów Wielkopolski City Council.

In the 2007 Polish parliamentary election, Pahl ran in the Zielona Góra constituency and was able to win a mandate for the Sejm with 14,135 votes. On November 16, 2023, he replaced Bartosz Arłukowicz in the European Parliament.

== Personal life ==
Witold Pahl is married and has a son.
