= Jakub Rutnicki =

Polish politician

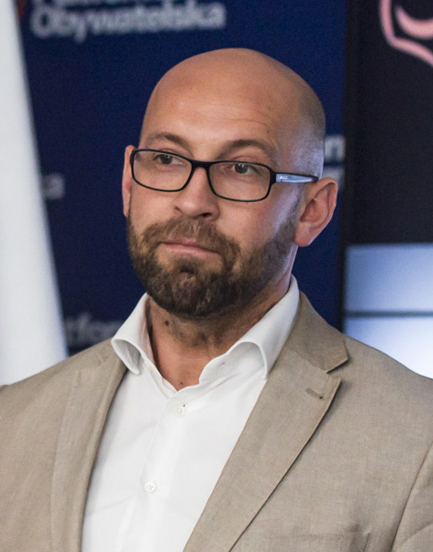
- Rutnicki in 2014

Minister of Sport and Tourism
- Incumbent
- Assumed office 24 July 2025
- Prime Minister: Donald Tusk
- Preceded by: Sławomir Nitras

Member of Sejm
- Incumbent
- Assumed office 18 October 2005

Personal details
- Born: 3 December 1978 (age 47) Szamotuły
- Party: Civic Platform
- Education: Adam Mickiewicz University

Jakub Adam Rutnicki (born 3 December 1978) is a Polish politician who has served as Minister of Sport and Tourism since 2025.

He was elected to the Sejm on 25 September 2005, getting 3,182 votes in 38 Piła district as a candidate from the Civic Platform list. Jakub was also a finalist from the first edition of Idol Poland, finishing ninth.

== See also ==
- Members of Polish Sejm 2005-2007
