= Maciej Grabowski (economist) =

Polish economist and politician (born 1959)

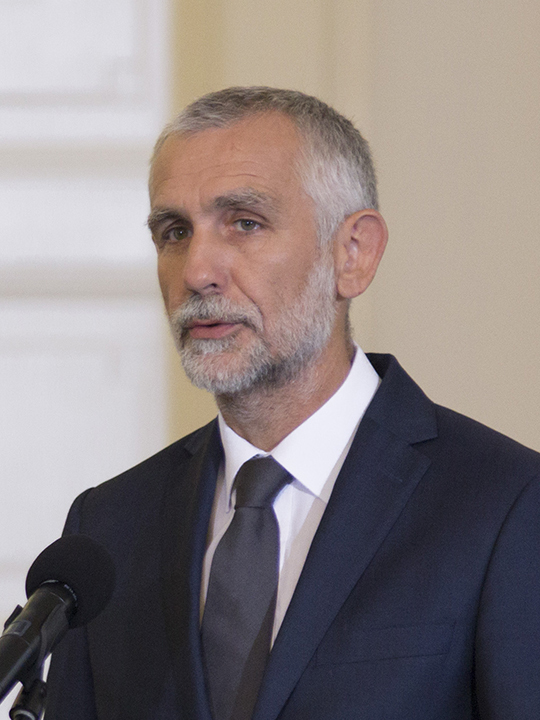
- Grabowski in 2014

Minister of Environment
- In office 27 November 2013 – 16 November 2015
- Prime Minister: Donald Tusk; Ewa Kopacz
- Preceded by: Marcin Korolec
- Succeeded by: Jan Szyszko

Personal details
- Born: Maciej Hipolit Grabowski; 13 August 1959 (age 67) Gdańsk, Poland
- Party: Civic Platform (2015–present); Independent (2007–2015)
- Education: University of Gdańsk; Gdynia Maritime University

Maciej Hipolit Grabowski (born 13 August 1959) is a Polish economist and politician. He served as the Undersecretary of State for the Ministry of Finance from 2008 to 2013, and the Minister of Environment from 27 November 2013 to 16 November 2015.

== Career ==
Grabowski graduated from the School of Transport Economics at the University of Gdańsk. In 1997, he obtained a doctorate from the University of Gdansk in economics based on a thesis entitled Transformation of the economy and the development of small and medium-sized enterprises in Poland compared to Hungary and Czechoslovakia. Additionally, he graduated from the School of Navigation at the Gdynia Maritime University. In the 1980s, he started working for Polish Ocean Lines as a deck officer.

Grabowski worked at the Gdansk Institute for Market Economics, where he served as the vice president. From 1994 to 2000, he worked as a lecturer at the University of Gdańsk. He actively participated in the Polish Lisbon Strategy Forum and the Polish Civic Forum. Grabowski also participated in the preparation of the National Development Strategy from 2007 to 2015.

In March 2008, he became a member of the Team of Strategic Advisors to the Prime Minister. On 13 November, he was appointed Undersecretary of State for the Ministry of Finance. In February 2013, he became the chief ombudsman for public finance discipline in government. Grabowski was dismissed from both positions following being appointed as the Minister of Environment.

On 20 November 2013, Prime Minister Donald Tusk announced the nomination of Grabowski as the Minister of Environment despite never having previous environmental experience. He was sworn on 27 November after being appointed by President Bronisław Komorowski. He held the same position in the Cabinet of Ewa Kopacz following the 2014 Polish local elections. In the 2015 Polish parliamentary election, Grabowski ran for the Gdańsk constituency as part of the Civic Platform party, but only got 1,917 votes, failing to win a seat. His term ended on 16 November 2015 and was succeeded by Jan Szyszko. In the 2020 Polish presidential election, Grabowski served as an environmental advisor to Independent candidate Szymon Hołownia.
