= Mirosław Drzewiecki =

Polish politician

Mirosław Michał Drzewiecki

Minister of Sport and Tourism
- In office 16 November 2007 – 13 October 2009

Member of the Sejm
- In office 25 November 1991 – 14 October 1993
- Constituency: 9 – Łódź
- In office 20 October 1997 – 7 November 2011

Personal details
- Born: 1956 (age 69–70)
- Party: Civic Platform

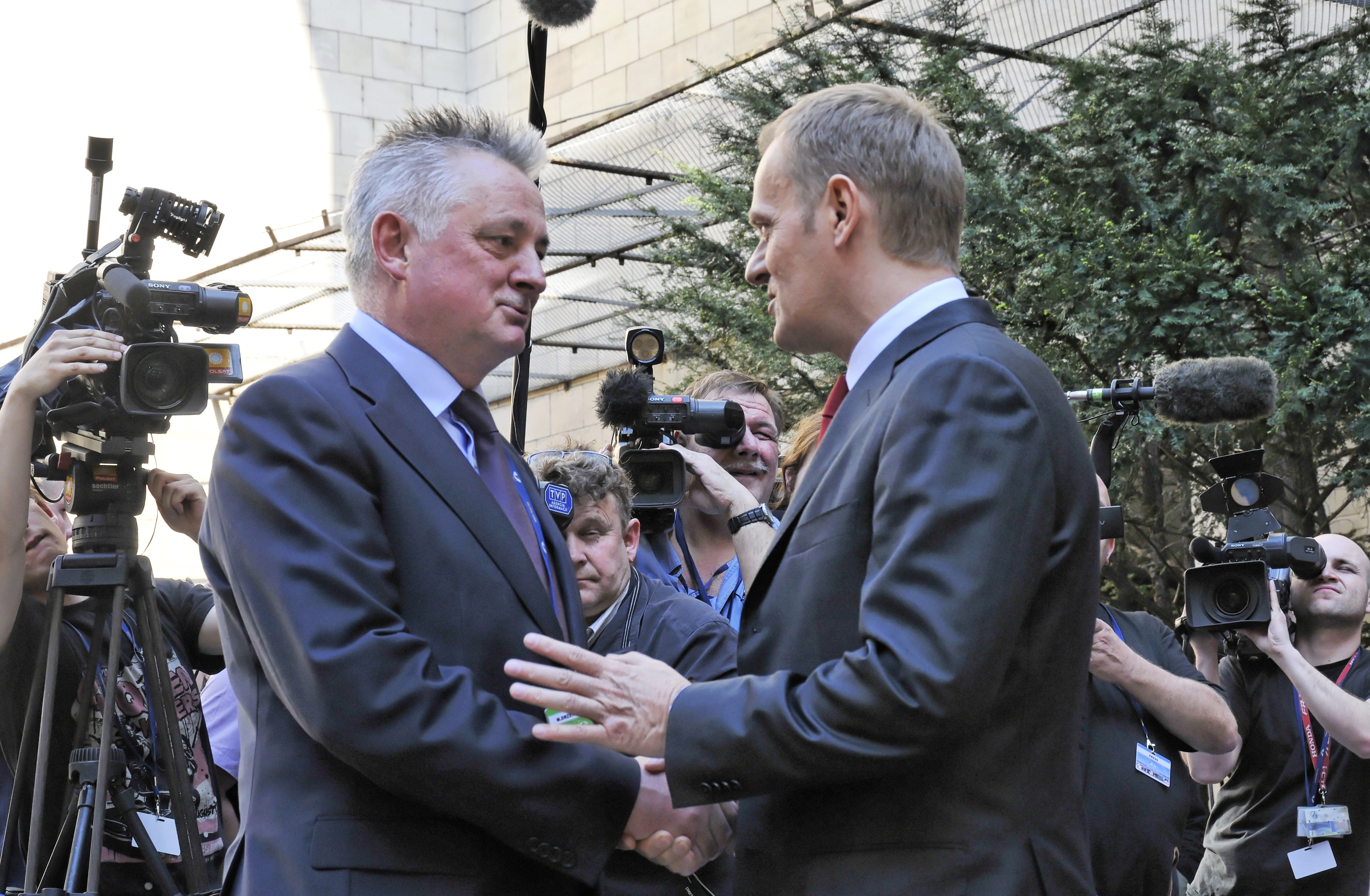
Flickr - europeanpeoplesparty - EPP Congress Warsaw (1011).jpg

Mirosław Michał Drzewiecki (Polish pronunciation: [miˈrɔswav dʐɛˈvʲɛtskʲi]) (born 8 July 1956 in Łódź) is a Polish politician, representing Civic Platform. He graduated from Emilia Sczaniecka High School in Łódź, followed by his 5-year stint at the University of Łódź Department of Law, where he obtained his M.A. title. In 1989 he established his own business, which dealt with upholstery and embroidery. Then he became the owner of several restaurants. Currently, he is one of the richest people in Poland, ranked by a weekly Wprost among the Top 100 richest Poles. He is the former Minister of Sport and Tourism. He took over the Ministry following the 2007 parliamentary election, and held the office from November 2007 to October 2009.

== Controversy ==
In 1996 his figure evoked many controversies because his embroidery firm had falsified trade marks of Adidas and Nike. But the most important controversy linked to Drzewiecki is the so-called Gambling Scandal. In result of this scandal he left the office of Minister of Sport and Tourism and several other prominent members of the Civic Platform were indicted or persecuted. Because of this scandal he was temporarily suspended from the Civic Platform membership and testified in front of the Parliamentary Investigative Commission.
