= Joanna Mucha =

Polish politician and economist

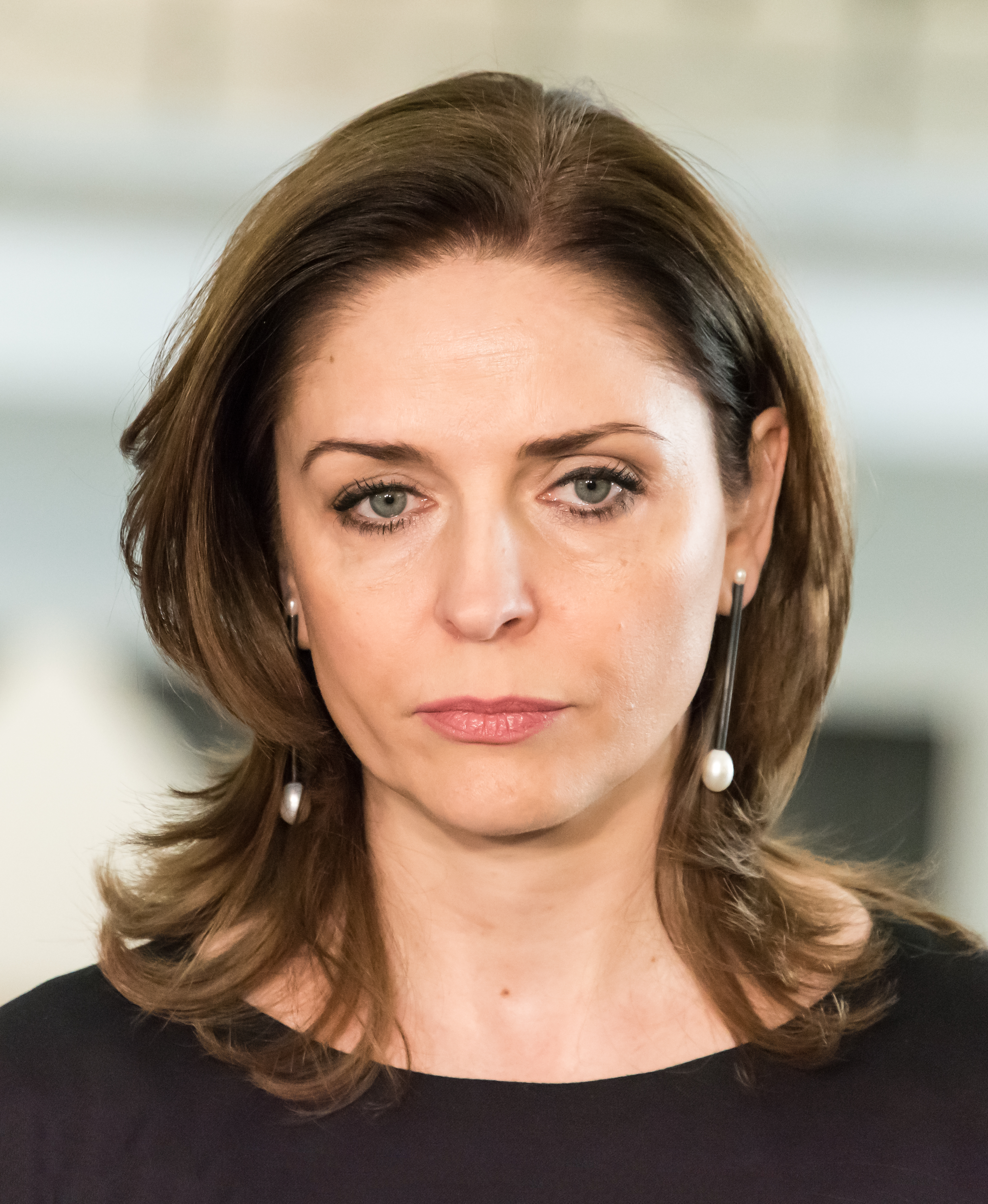
- Joanna Mucha in 2023

Minister of Sport and Tourism
- In office 17 November 2011 – 27 November 2013
- President: Bronisław Komorowski
- Prime Minister: Donald Tusk
- Preceded by: Adam Giersz
- Succeeded by: Andrzej Biernat

Deputy Minister of National Education
- In office 13 December 2023 – 23 June 2025

Member of the Sejm
- Incumbent
- Assumed office 21 October 2007
- Constituency: 6 – Lublin

Personal details
- Born: 12 April 1976 (age 49) Płońsk, Polish People's Republic
- Party: Poland 2050 (2021–2026)
- Other political affiliations: Civic Platform (2003–2021)

Joanna Mucha (born 12 April 1976) is a Polish liberal politician, economist, member of the Polish Sejm, academic teacher, doctor of economics She served as Minister of Sport and Tourism from 2011 to 2013 in the Second Cabinet of Donald Tusk. She also served as Deputy Minister of National Education from 2023 to 2025. in the Third Cabinet of Donald Tusk. In 2001 she graduated from the University of Warsaw.
