= Danuta Dmowska =

Polish fencer and politician (born 1982)

Danuta Dmowska-Andrzejuk
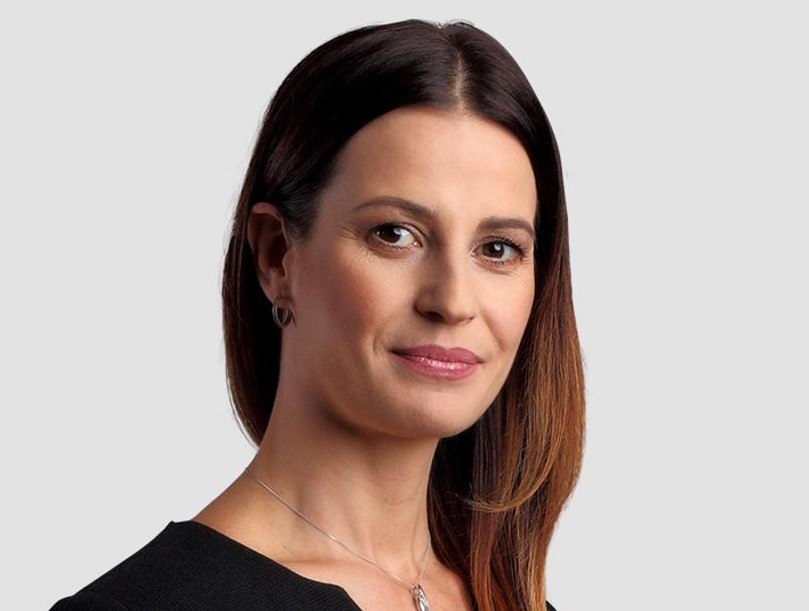

Minister of Sport and Tourism
- In office 27 November 2023 – 13 December 2023
- Prime Minister: Mateusz Morawiecki
- Preceded by: Kamil Bortniczuk
- In office 5 December 2019 – 6 October 2020
- President: Andrzej Duda
- Prime Minister: Mateusz Morawiecki
- Preceded by: Mateusz Morawiecki
- Succeeded by: Piotr Gliński

Personal details
- Born: 1 March 1982 (age 44) Warsaw, Poland
- Education: Józef Piłsudski University of Physical Education in Warsaw
- Profession: Épée, Fencing

Danuta Dmowska
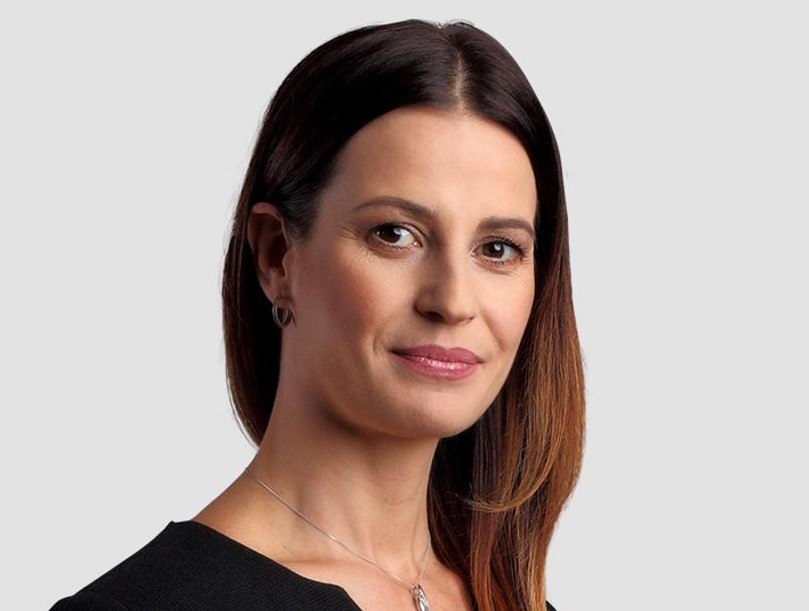
Medal record
Women's Fencing
Representing Poland
World Championships
Gold medal – first place	2005 Leipzig	Women's épée

Danuta Małgorzata Dmowska-Andrzejuk (born 1 March 1982) is a Polish politician, former fencer and World Épée Champion 2005. In the years 2019–2020, she served as the Minister of Sport in the Second Cabinet of Mateusz Morawiecki.

== Early life and education ==
In 2001, she graduated from the XLV Romuald Traugutt's Lyceum in Warsaw, Poland. She studied at the Józef Piłsudski University of Physical Education.

== Sports career ==
Dmowska started fencing when she was ten years old. At first, she fought with foil but at the age of twelve she started training with épée. In January 2005 she was second in the World Cup Competition in Prague. In June 2005, she was third in the World Cup Competition in Barcelona. In October 2005 she achieved her greatest success in her career so far, at the World Championship in Leipzig, she won the individual Gold Medal. In the final, she beat the Estonia fencer, Maarika Võsu. In November 2005 she came second in the Fencing Masters Tournament in Levallois, Paris, losing to the 2004 Olympic silver medalist, the French fencer, Laura Flessel-Colovic. The world's top eight women fencers took part in the tournament. She took 28th place in the European Championship 2005 in Zalaegerszeg.

Dmowska was a member of the Legia Warsaw sports club. She represented Poland as a junior and as a senior. In national competitions, she has won the Polish Junior Individual National Championship, the Polish Senior Individual National Championship, the Polish Senior Team Championship, the Polish Youth Cup and the Polish Senior Cup. She has won the Polish Championship in Épée in 2004 and 2006.

=== Competition record ===
Year	Championship	Result
2005	World Championship, Leipzig	Gold Medal, Individual
2005	Polish Championship, Wrocław	Gold Medal, Team
2005	European Championship, Zalaegerszeg	2nd Place, Team
2005	World Cup, Barcelona	3rd Place, Individual
2005	World Cup, Prague	2nd Place, Individual
2005	Polish Cup, Warsaw	2nd Place, Individual
2005	Polish Cup, Warsaw	3rd Place, Individual
2004	Polish Cup, Warsaw	3rd Place, Individual
2004	Polish Cup, Gliwice	2nd Place, Individual
2004	Polish Championship, Kraków	Gold Medal, Individual
2004	Polish Championship, Kraków	Silver Medal, Team
2003	Polish Cup, Gliwice	2nd Place, Individual
2003	Polish Cup, Warsaw	2nd Place, Individual
2003	Polish Cup, Warsaw	3rd Place, Individual
2003	Polish Championship, Wrocław	Gold Medal, Team
2003	European Championship, Bourges	5th Place, Team
2003	Winner of the Polish Cup	
2002	Polish Cup, Warsaw	2nd Place, Individual
2002	Polish Cup, Warsaw	2nd Place, Individual
2002	Polish Cup, Katowice	Silver Medal, Individual
2002	Polish Championship, Katowice	Bronze Medal, Individual
2001	Polish Cup, Katowice	3rd Place, Individual
2001	Polish Championship, Warsaw	Gold Medal, Team
2000	Polish Championship, Gdańsk	Gold Medal, Team

== Political career ==
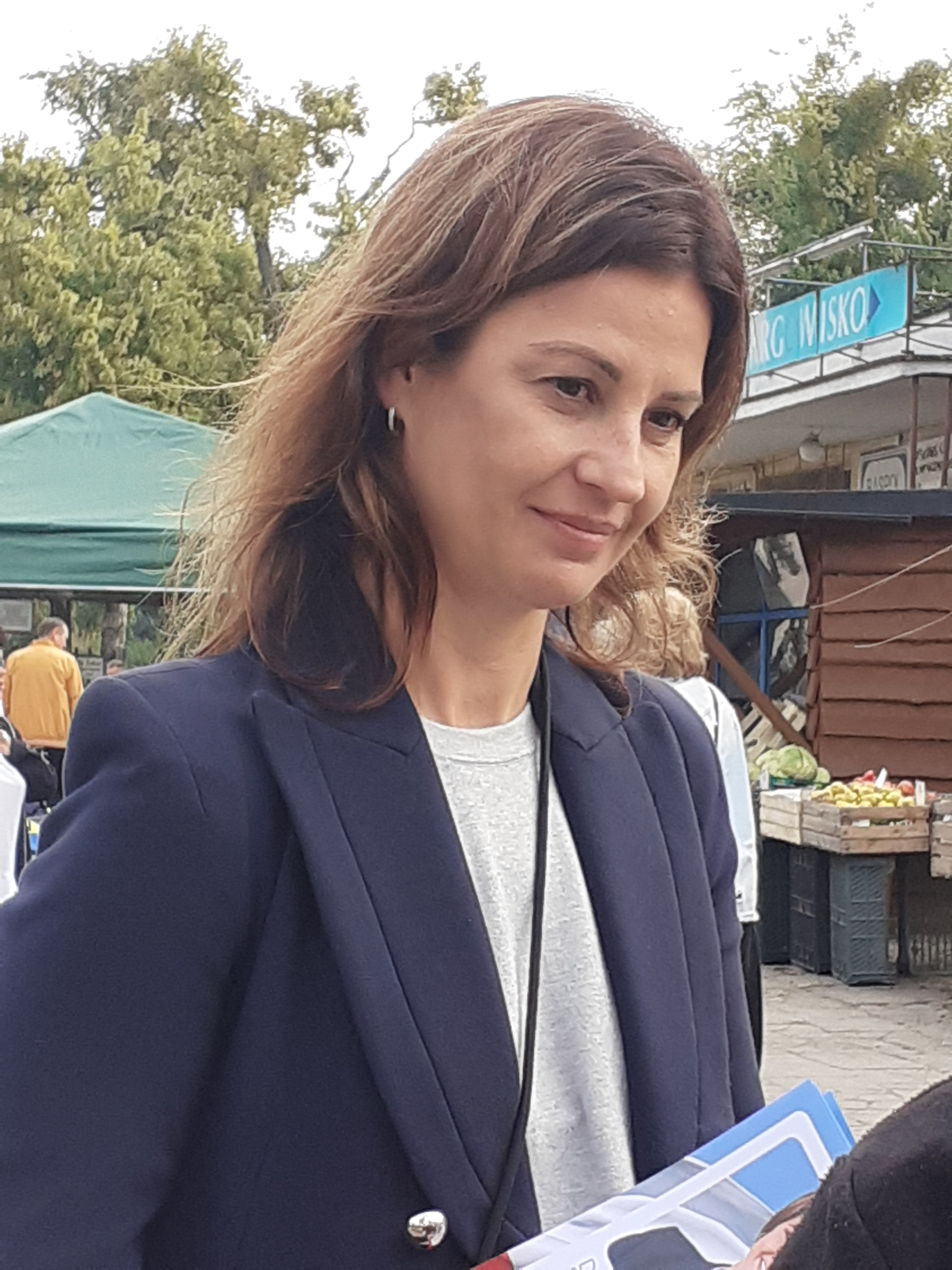
Danuta Dmowska (2023)

On 5 December 2019 she was appointed Minister of Sport by the President of Poland. She was dismissed from office on 6 October 2020, due to the liquidation of a separate ministry. In the same month, she became the Prime Minister's plenipotentiary for the creation of the National Sports Center (Narodowe Centrum Sportu). In April 2021, the Minister of State Assets, Jacek Sasin, appointed her as a social advisor and chairman of the team for sports sponsorship by State Treasury companies.

== Personal life ==
In 2007, she married a fencer Robert Andrzejuk.

Political offices
Preceded by Mateusz Morawiecki	Minister of Sports and Tourism in Poland; 2019 - 2020	Succeeded by Piotr Gliński
