= Marian Zembala =

Polish cardiac surgeon, politician, and deputy (1950–2022)

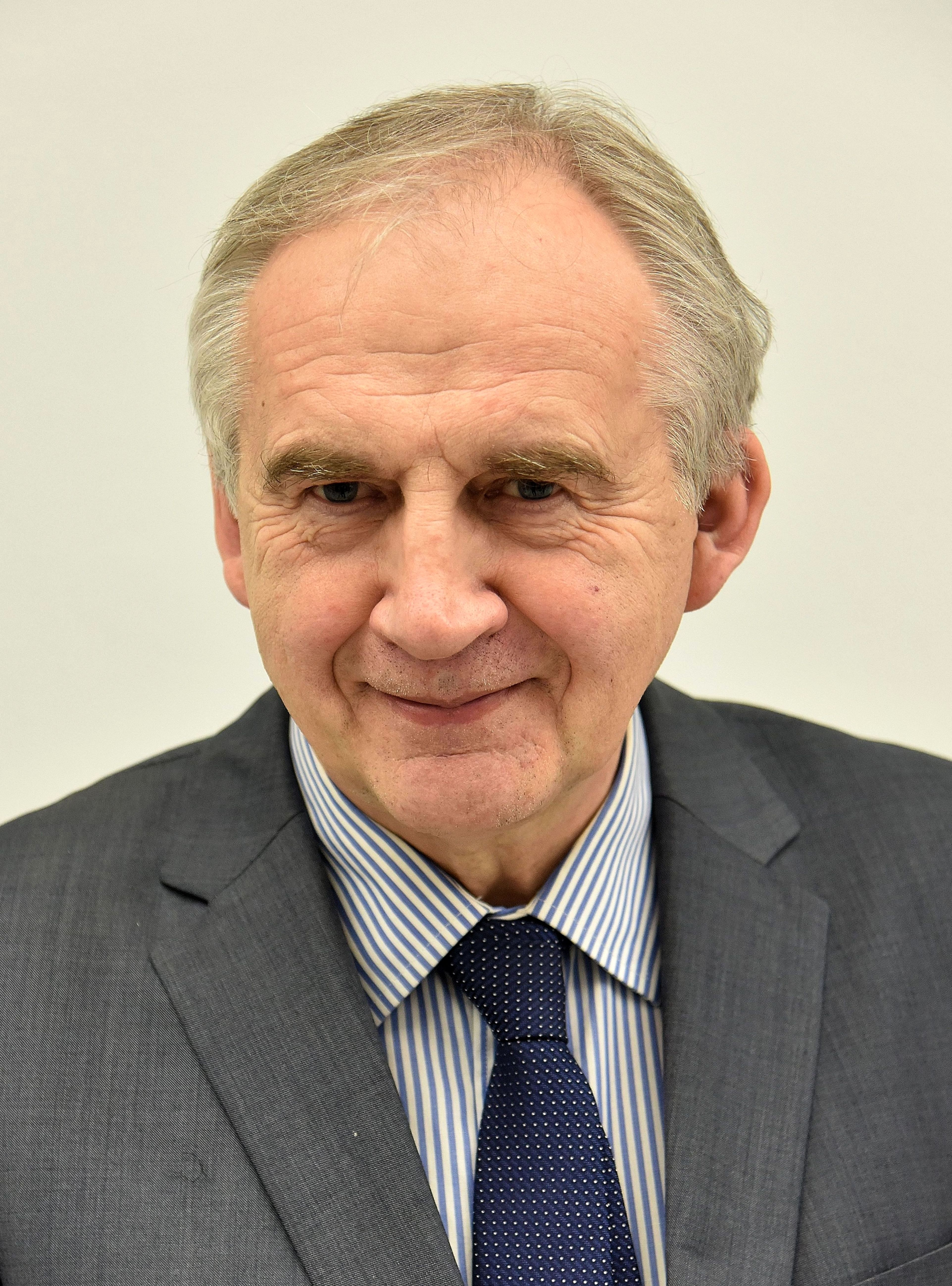
- Zembala in 2016

Minister of Health
- In office 16 June 2015 – 16 November 2015
- President: Bronisław Komorowski; Andrzej Duda
- Prime Minister: Ewa Kopacz
- Preceded by: Bartosz Arłukowicz
- Succeeded by: Konstanty Radziwiłł

Member of the Sejm
- In office 12 November 2015 – 12 November 2019
- Constituency: 31 – Katowice II

Personal details
- Born: 11 February 1950 Krzepice, Poland
- Died: 19 March 2022 (aged 72) Zbrosławice, Poland
- Party: Civic Platform
- Spouse: Hanna Zembala
- Children: 4
- Profession: Cardiac surgeon and Transplantologist
- Known for: Performing the first single-lung transplant in Poland
- Awards: Knight's Cross of the Order of Polonia Restituta (2004); Order of the Smile (2005); Pro Ecclesia et Pontifice (2008); Commander's Cross of the Order of Polonia Restituta (2011); 3rd Class of the Order of Merit of Ukraine (2012)
- Medical career
- Institutions: Medical University of Silesia

Marian Zembala (11 February 1950 – 19 March 2022) was a Polish cardiac surgeon, full professor of medicine who served as Health Minister in 2015 and as a deputy to the Sejm (2015–2019). He was a member of Zbigniew Religa's team who performed the first successful heart transplant in Poland in 1985.

== Political career ==
=== Minister for Health: 2015 ===
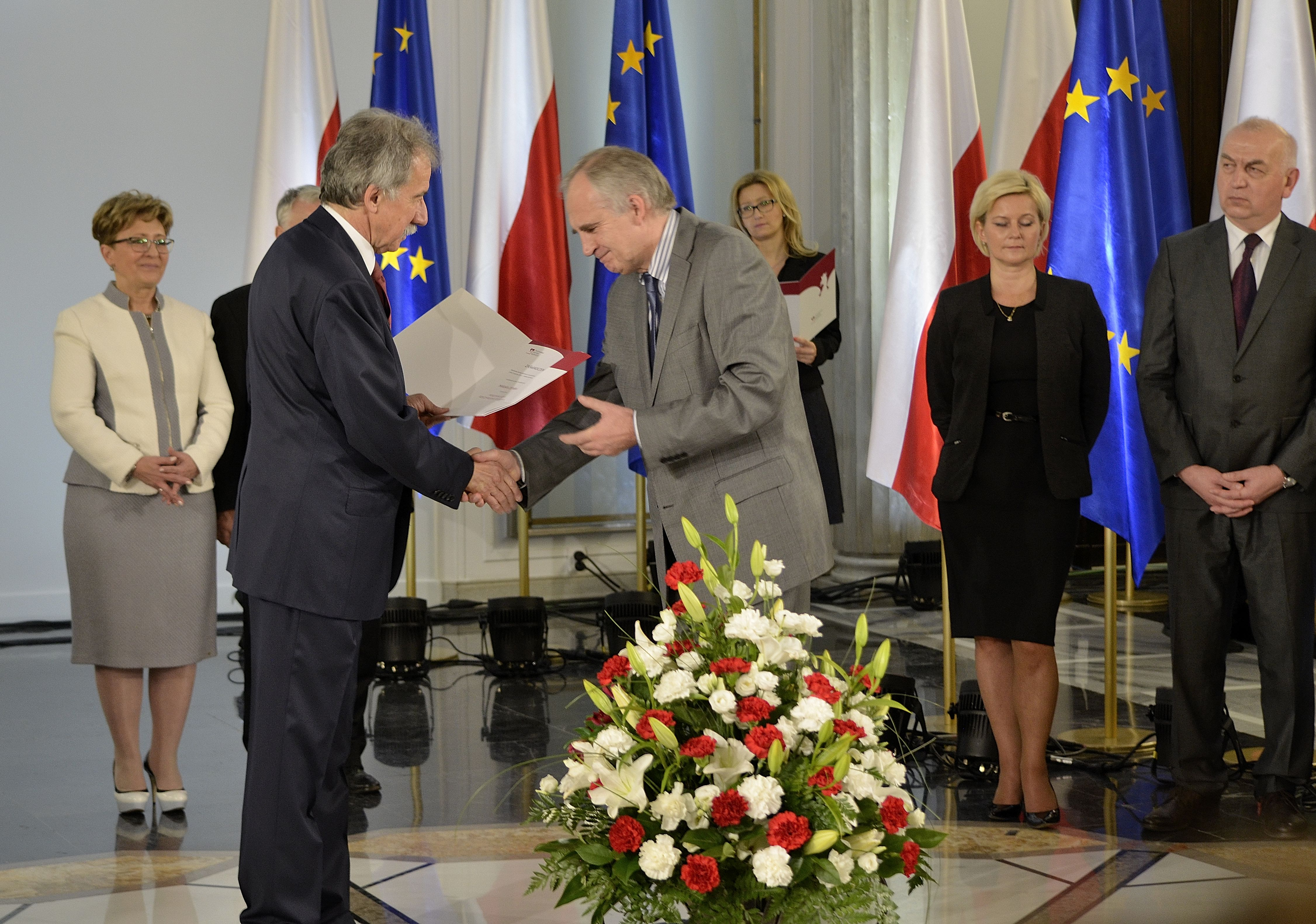
Marian Zembala receiving his certificate of election to the Sejm, 2015.

In October, he improved the availability of specialist treatment for seniors - geriatric and cardiological teleconsilium: implementation of a nationwide pilot based on the Zabrze teleconsultation model, in cooperation with the Ministry of Administration and Digitization. In the same month, teleconsultations in rural areas with limited access to a specialist project prepared in cooperation with the Institute of Rural Medicine in Lublin and the Ministry of Agriculture and Rural Development. Zembala increased the number of specialists in the field of geriatrics by launching new, shortened specialization paths for internists with proven experience in internal medicine and geriatrics, and for independent scientists with experience in geriatrics in cooperation with the Ministry of Family, Labour and Social Policy and the Medical Center of Postgraduate Education.

Zembala introduced a health policy program in the field of geriatrics named "National Program for Prevention and Treatment of Age-related Conditions in Poland for 2016-2020" to develop, under the supervision of the Minister of Health, the Minister of Labor and Social Welfare, the leaders of Polish geriatrics and the assumptions of coordinated geriatric care. He also introduced a pilot project of Day Care Homes and new forms of care for the elderly. A competition for the pilot creation and operation of 40 Day Care Homes for dependent people, in particular for elderly people, which was announced on 23 July 2015, and the application deadline until 30 October 2015. The project value was PLN 40 million

In the national elections, Zembala received 53,610 votes in the Katowice constituency for the Civic Platform list and he received a mandate deputy of parliament VIII term. However, his party lost the elections to the national conservative Law and Justice party. In accordance with the constitution, Kopacz resigned along with Zembala and all other members of her cabinet at the first sitting of the newly elected Sejm. Zembala remained in office until his successor Konstanty Radziwiłł was sworn in on 16 November 2015.
