= Marcin Korolec =

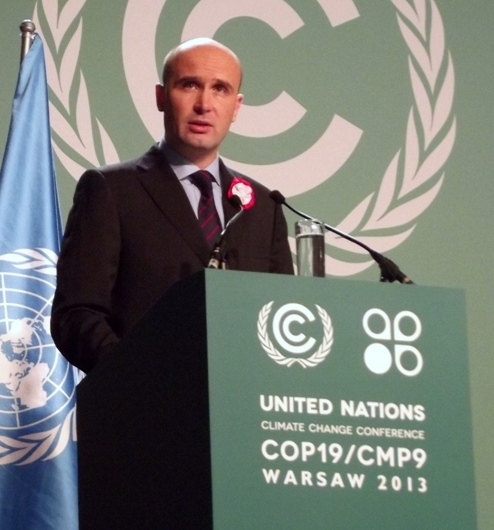

Minister of Environment
- In office 18 November 2011 – 27 November 2013
- Prime Minister: Donald Tusk
- Preceded by: Andrzej Kraszewski
- Succeeded by: Maciej Grabowski

Personal details
- Born: 24 December 1968 (age 57)
- Party: Independent
- Education: University of Warsaw, École nationale d'administration

Marcin Korolec (born 24 December 1968) is a Polish civil servant and lawyer. He was the minister of environment in Donald Tusk's cabinet from 2011 to 2013 and secretary of state responsible for climate negotiations from 2013 to October 2015. He also served as deputy minister of economy responsible for trade policy in the cabinets of Kazimierz Marcinkiewicz, Jarosław Kaczyński and Donald Tusk between 2005 and 2011.

== Early life and education ==
Korolec was born on 24 December 1968 in Warsaw. He is a son of Jerzy Bartłomiej Korolec (died 2000) – historian, diplomat and liberal-minded Catholic intellectual who serve as Polish ambassador to Slovakia in the early 1990s.

After obtaining MA in law and history at the Warsaw University (1994) he graduated from the French École nationale d'administration (1996).

== Early career ==
In the years 1993-1995 and 1997-1998 he worked as a lawyer in various national and international law firms and in the department of law and treaties at the Polish ministry of foreign affairs.

From 1999 to 2001, Korolec was an advisor to Jan Kułakowski, the Government’s Plenipotentiary for Poland’s EU Accession Negotiations, responsible for the fields of competition policy, free movement of goods and persons, agriculture and consumers protection. In 2001-2004, he was the Minister’s Counsellor at the Office of the Committee for European Integration, in Minister Danuta Hübner’s private office. He held a number of lecturing positions at the Polish National School of Public Administration, the Warsaw University, Collegium Civitas in Warsaw, J. Tischner European University in Cracow. His lectures covered i.a. structural funds and coordination of Poland’s European policy.

From 2004 to 2005 Korolec worked as a partner at Euroidea consulting company.

== Political career ==
On 23 November 2005, Korolec was appointed by the Prime Minister Kazimierz Marcinkiewicz as the Undersecretary of State in Ministry of Economy. For two governmental terms of Office (2005-2011) he was primarily responsible for horizontal European issues (energy, competitiveness, trade and climate policy). He was also in charge of Poland’s relations with WTO, OECD and UNIDO. From 2010, he was a member of the Supervisory Board of the National Fund for Environmental Protection and Water Management.

On 18 November 2011, Korolec was appointed by the President Bronisław Komorowski as the minister of environment in the Second Cabinet of Donald Tusk. In this capacity, he represented Poland in the Council of the International Renewable Energy Agency (IRENA) and EU-Russia Gas Advisory Council. From November 2012, he was also a member of the UNIDO Green Industry Platform Advisory Board.

During his time in office, Korolec co-led (along with EU Commissioner Connie Hedegaard) the European Union’s delegation at the 2011 UNFCCC UN Conference in Durban. He also hosted the first meeting of the Weimar Triangle’s Ministers of the Environment in 2013.

In early 2013, Korolec was the Polish government’s candidate to succeed Kandeh Yumkella as Director General of UNIDO; the position went to Li Yong.

== Later career ==
Amid a cabinet reshuffle in November 2013, Korolec was removed from office, but was named as the government climate envoy for the 2013 United Nations Climate Change Conference. He served as a representative of Poland on the Board of the Green Climate Fund (GCF) where he was also appointed the Chair of the GCF Ethics and Audit Committee.

== Other activities ==
- European Investment Bank (EIB), Member of the Climate and Environment Advisory Council (since 2021)
- Meva Energy, Member of the Board of Directors (since 2020)

== Personal life ==
Korolec is married to Olga Korolec and a father of four (sons Jan, Bartłomiej, Krzysztof and daughter Teresa). He is a member of the Club of Catholic Intellectuals.

== Decorations ==
- Order of the Crown, Belgium
