= Bogdan Zdrojewski =

Polish politician (born 1957)

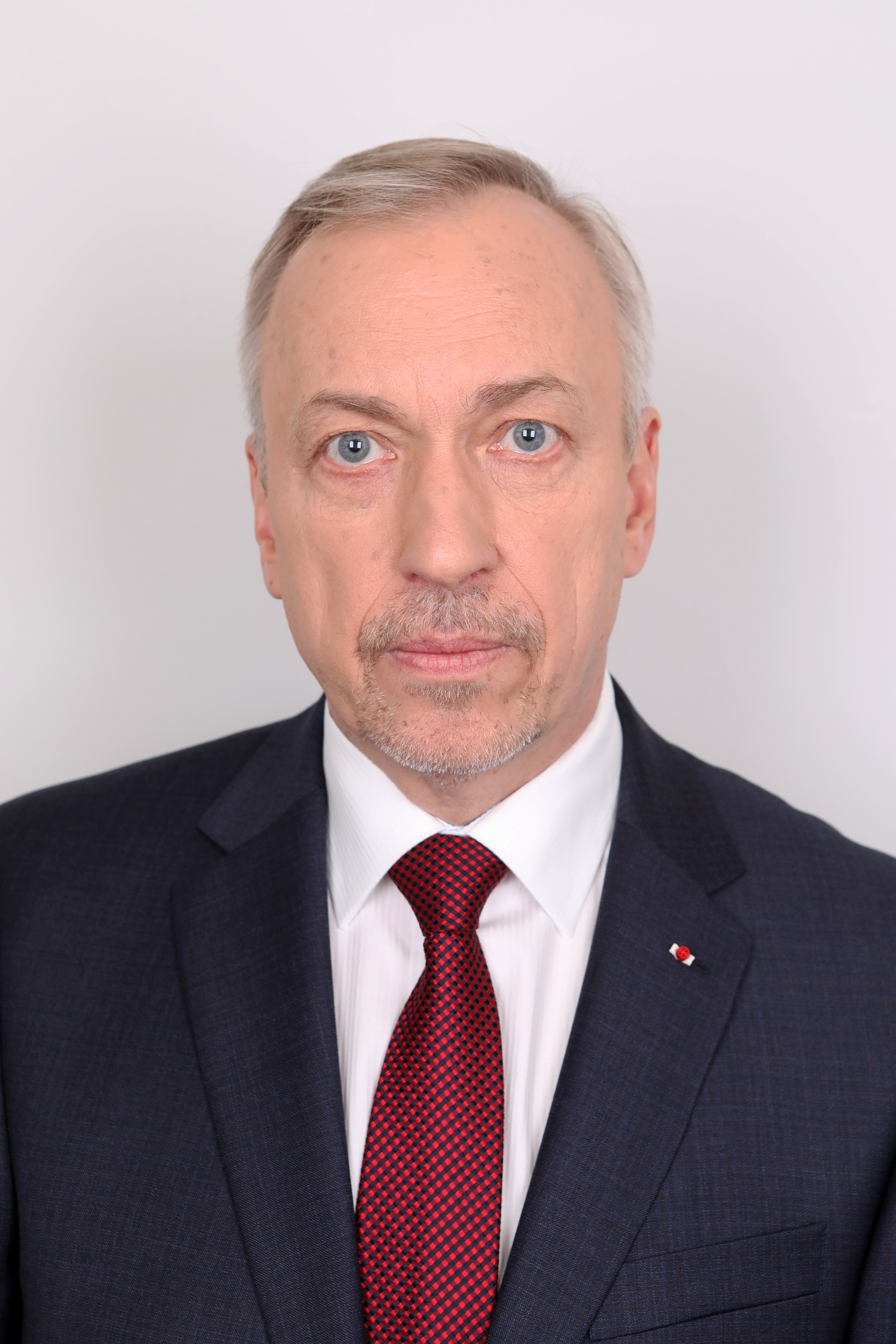

Minister of Culture and National Heritage
- In office 16 November 2007 – 17 June 2014
- President: Lech Kaczyński; Bronisław Komorowski (Acting); Bogdan Borusewicz (Acting); Grzegorz Schetyna (Acting); Bronisław Komorowski
- Prime Minister: Donald Tusk
- Preceded by: Kazimierz Michał Ujazdowski
- Succeeded by: Małgorzata Omilanowska

Parliamentary Leader of the Civic Platform 5th Leader of the Civic Platform in the Sejm
- In office 5 December 2006 – 5 November 2007
- Leader: Donald Tusk
- Preceded by: Donald Tusk
- Succeeded by: Zbigniew Chlebowski

Member of the Senate
- Incumbent
- Assumed office 12 November 2019
- Constituency: 6 – Wrocław

Member of the Sejm
- In office 25 September 2005 – 27 May 2014
- Constituency: 3 – Wrocław

Member of the European Parliament for Lower Silesian and Opole
- In office 1 July 2014 – 1 July 2019

City mayor of Wrocław
- In office 5 June 1990 – 8 May 2001
- Preceded by: Stefan Skąpski
- Succeeded by: Stanisław Huskowski

Personal details
- Born: 18 May 1957 (age 68) Kłodzko, Poland
- Party: Civic Platform
- Spouse: Barbara Zdrojewska

Bogdan Andrzej Zdrojewski [ˈbɔɡdan zdrɔˈjɛfskʲi] (born 18 May 1957) is a Polish politician, mayor of Wrocław from 1990 to 2001, and Minister of Culture and National Heritage from 2007 till 2014. He has also been member of the Polish and of the European Parliament.

== Biography ==
Zdrojewski was born in Klodzko.

From 1976 to 1977, Zdrojewski worked as a junior machinist of electric traction at the Polish National Railways, and then until 1979 as a specialist in the National Grain and Milling Factory in Wrocław.

Zdrojewski enrolled at the University of Wrocław's Department of Philosophy and History in 1980; there he founded and chaired the History of Philosophy Scientific Circle. The same year he joined the Independent Students' Union (ISU), becoming head of its department branch. From 1982 till 1984, during the martial law in Poland, Zdrojewski led ISU at the University of Wrocław. He graduated in philosophy in 1983, and in cultural studies in 1985.

In 1984, Zdrojewski became a faculty member at the Wrocław University of Economics, and a member of the founding committee of NSZZ Solidarność. From 1989 to 1990, he worked for the Institute of Sociology at the University of Wrocław. At the same time, he was a secretary of the Wrocław Solidarity Citizens' Committee as well as a founder and director of the Centre for Social Research of the regional executive committee of NSZZ Solidarność in Lower Silesia.

Zdrojewski served three terms as a city councillor of Wrocław (1990–1994, 1994–1998, and 1998–2001). He was the first freely-elected mayor of the City of Wrocław, and Poland's youngest mayor (33 when he took office). He served as mayor for 11 years (from 4 June 1990 to 1 September 2001). During the 1997 flood in Lower Silesia, Zdrojewski, coordinated the city's response to the threat, including by leading efforts to deliver assistance to residents in need.

At the 1997 elections Zdrojewski was elected to the Senate of Poland, receiving 241,179 votes as an independent candidate. He resigned on 11 January 2000, after the Constitutional Court's decision that a mayor's position cannot be combined with a senator's mandate. He resigned from the mayor's position in May 2001, as he decided to stand as a candidate in the 2001 parliamentary elections. He was elected for the 4th parliamentary term of Sejm from Platforma Obywatelska (47,297 votes).

In 2005, Zdrojewski was reelected to Sejm of the 5th legislature from Platforma Obywatelska list in Wrocław (73,959 votes). The following year, he took the position of Minister of Defence in Donald Tusk's shadow cabinet. On 5 December 2006, he became head of the parliamentary group of Platforma Obywatelska. Standing in Wrocław at the 2007 elections, he received the third-highest result in Poland, which amounted to 213,883 votes.

On 16 November 2007, Zdrojewski was appointed Minister of Culture and National Heritage in Donald Tusk's first government. At the 2011 elections, he was re-elected to the Sejm gaining the support of 149,962 voters, and confirmed by Prime Minister Tusk in the same ministerial position.

At the 2014 European elections, Zdrojewski received a mandate of a Member of the European Parliament of the 8th legislature. He took over the mandate on 1 July 2014. He did not contested the 2019 European elections.

Married to Barbara Zdrojewska (also a senator), they have a son and a daughter.

== Selected awards ==
- 2015 r. Gloria Artis Gold – Medal for Merit to Culture
- 2014 r. Grand Cross of the First Class of the Kingdom of the Netherlands – for civil merit
- 2014 r. Officer's Cross of the Order of Polonia Restituta – awarded by President Bronisław Komorowski
- 2014 r. Order of the Coss of the First Class of Terra Maarjamaa – awarded by the President of the Republic of Estonia, Toomas Hendrik IIves
- 2013 r. Cross of Recognition of the Second Class of the Latvian Republic – for extraordinary, lasting efforts to enrich deep and dynamic cooperation in the area of culture
- 2012 r. Order of Saint-Charles of the Second Class, Commander – awarded by Prince Albert of Monaco
- 2012 r. Commander, Légion d'honneur – awarded by the President of France, François Hollande
- 2012 r. Maltese Cross–awarded by the Grand Master of the Sovereign Military Order of Malta, Matthew Festing
- 2012 r. Order of Merit of the Free State of Saxony – for contributions to the growth of Polish-German relations in the area of culture, enhancing cooperation, preserving cultural heritage and its promotion outside the borders of the Free State
- 2012 r. Royal Norwegian Order of Merit – Commander with Cross–awarded by His Majesty King of Norway Harald V
- 2008 r. Grand Cross of the Order of Merit –awarded by the President of Portugal
- 2002 r. Gold Cross of Merit–awarded by the President of the Republic of Poland, Aleksander Kwaśniewski
- 2001 r. Cross First Class of the Order of Merit of the Federal Republic of Germany (Das Verdienstkreuz 1 Klasse) – awarded by the President of Germany
- 1998 r. Order Sancti Silvestri –awarded by Pope John Paul II (by a decision of 9 January 1998)
- "Gran de Gra-Cruz da Ordem do Merito" Cross of Merit awarded by the President of Portugal.
