= Małgorzata Omilanowska =

Polish art historian and politician

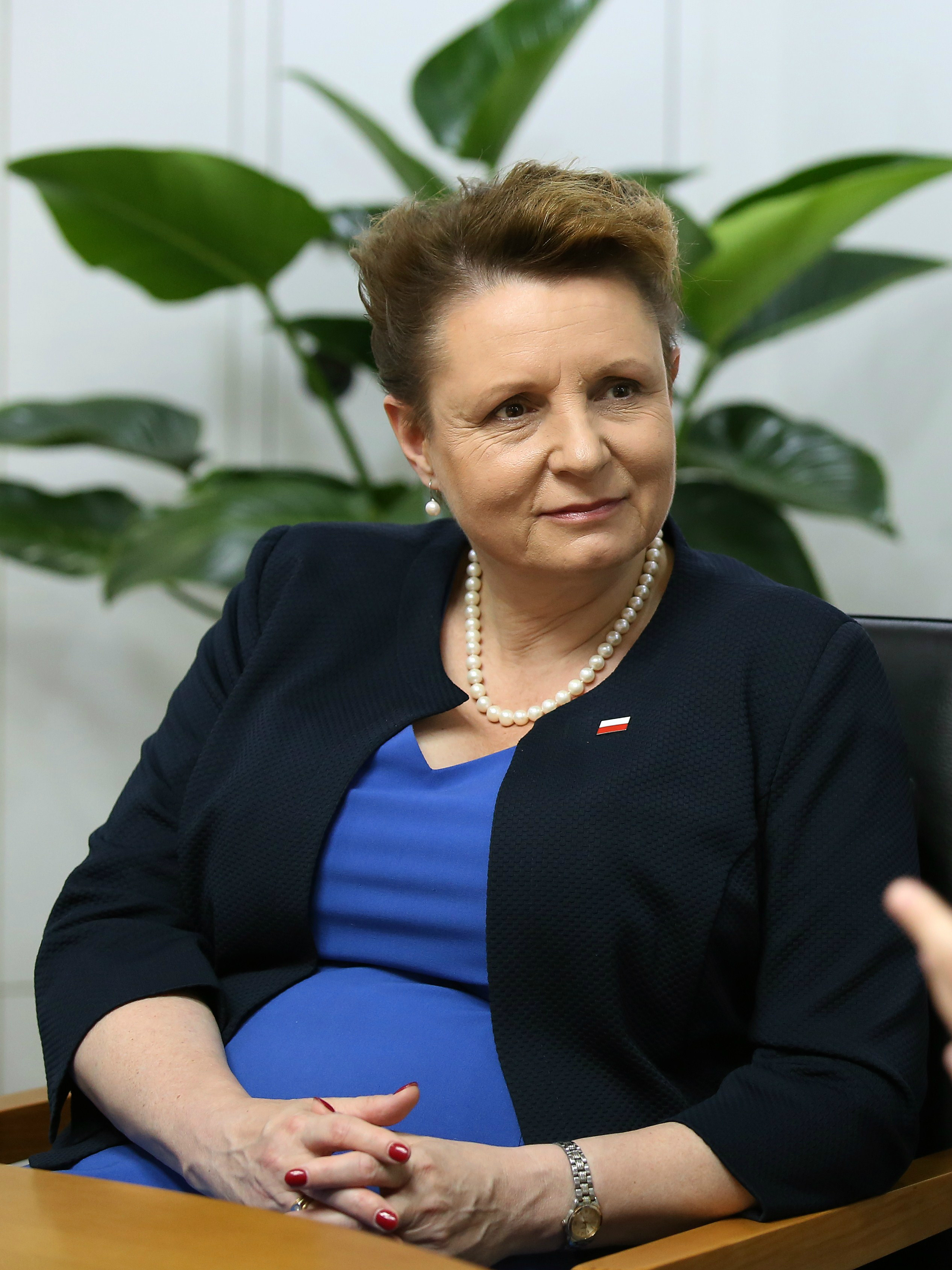

Minister of Culture and National Heritage
- In office 17 June 2014 – 16 November 2015
- Prime Minister: Donald Tusk; Ewa Kopacz
- Preceded by: Bogdan Zdrojewski
- Succeeded by: Piotr Gliński

Personal details
- Born: 10 April 1960 (age 66) Warsaw, Poland
- Party: Independent
- Education: University of Warsaw; Technische Universität Berlin

Małgorzata Omilanowska (born 10 April 1960 in Warsaw) is a Polish art historian and politician. She served as Poland's Minister of Culture and National Heritage from July 2014 to November 2015.

== Education and academic career ==
Omilanowska completed her undergraduate and postgraduate studies at the University of Warsaw before moving to Technische Universität Berlin, where she concluded her doctorate in architecture in 1994. She taught at the Institute of Art within the Polish Academy of Sciences from 1995 to 2007, serving as a deputy director of the institute from 1999. From 2006 she has been a professor at the University of Gdansk's department of art history.

== Political career ==
Omilanowska was named as a Deputy Culture Minister in 2012. She was promoted to Minister of Culture and National Heritage on 17 June 2014 after her predecessor, Bogdan Zdrojewski, stood down following his election to the European Parliament.
