= Ministry of Sport and Tourism (Poland) =

Polish ministry

- Ministerstwo Sportu i Turystyki
- Ministerial logotype

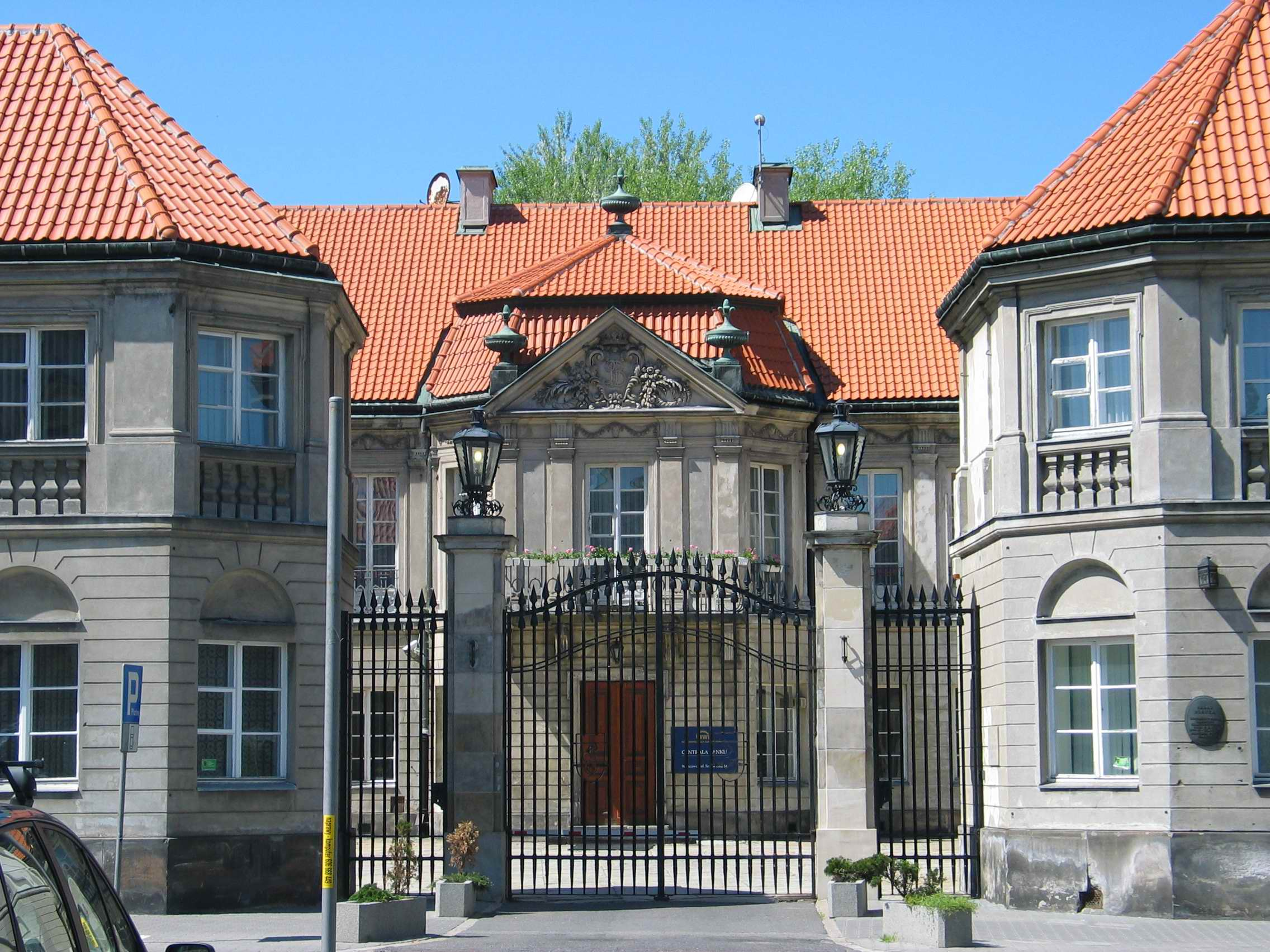
- Seat of the ministry in the Blanka Palace

Agency overview
- Formed: 1 September 2005 (Note: Originally as the Ministry of Sport. Called the Ministry of Sport and Tourism from 23 July 2007 to 15 November 2019, the Ministry of Sport from 15 November 2019 to 1 March 2021, and the Ministry of Sport and Tourism from 26 October 2021.)
- Preceding agency: Ministry of National Education and Sport
- Headquarters: ul. Senatorska 14, Warsaw
- Minister responsible: Jakub Rutnicki, Minister of Sport and Tourism
- Parent agency: Council of Ministers
- Website: www.gov.pl/web/ministry-of-sports-and-tourism

Ministry of Sport and Tourism of the Republic of Poland was created on August 23, 2005 by decision of the Council of Ministers under then - Prime Minister Marek Belka.

It was renamed on July 23, 2007 when tourism was placed under ministry authority.

Ministry goals:

- Overseeing sport clubs
- Matters related to sport
- Matters related to tourism

State-controlled Polska Konfederacja Sportu (Polish Sport Union) became integral part of the ministry.

== List of ministers ==
Portrait	Name	Party	Term of office		Prime Minister (Cabinet)
Ministers of Sport (2005–2007)					
	Marek Belka	Nonpartisan	1 September 2005	31 October 2005	Marek Belka(Belka I, II)
	Tomasz Lipiec	Nonpartisan	31 October 2005	9 July 2007	Kazimierz Marcinkiewicz (Marcinkiewicz), Jarosław Kaczyński ( Kaczyński)
	Jarosław Kaczyński (acting)	Law and Justice	9 July 2007	23 July 2007	Jarosław Kaczyński (Kaczyński)
Ministers of Sport and Tourism (2007–2019)					
	Elżbieta Jakubiak	Law and Justice	23 July 2007	16 November 2007	Jarosław Kaczyński ( Kaczyński)
	Mirosław Drzewiecki	Civic Platform	16 November 2007	13 October 2009	Donald Tusk (Tusk I)
	Adam Giersz	Nonpartisan	13 October 2009	18 November 2011	Donald Tusk (Tusk I)
	Joanna Mucha	Civic Platform	18 November 2011	27 November 2013	Donald Tusk (Tusk II)
	Andrzej Biernat	Civic Platform	27 November 2013	15 June 2015	Donald Tusk (Tusk II), Ewa Kopacz (Kopacz)
	Adam Korol	Nonpartisan	15 June 2015	16 November 2015	Ewa Kopacz (Kopacz)
	Witold Bańka	Law and Justice	16 November 2015	15 November 2019	Beata Szydło (Szydło), Mateusz Morawiecki (Morawiecki)
Ministers of Sport (2019–2020)					
	Mateusz Morawiecki	Law and Justice	15 November 2019	5 December 2019	Mateusz Morawiecki (Morawiecki II)
	Danuta Dmowska	Nonpartisan	5 December 2019	6 October 2020	Mateusz Morawiecki (Morawiecki II)
Ministers of Culture, National Heritage and Sport (2020–2021)
	Piotr Gliński	Law and Justice	6 October 2020	26 October 2021	Mateusz Morawiecki (Morawiecki II)
Ministers of Sport and Tourism (2021–Present)
	Kamil Bortniczuk	The Republicans	26 October 2021	27 November 2023	Mateusz Morawiecki (Morawiecki II)
	Danuta Dmowska	Nonpartisan	27 November 2023	13 December 2023	Mateusz Morawiecki (Morawiecki III)
	Sławomir Nitras	Civic Platform	13 December 2023	24 July 2025	Donald Tusk (Tusk III)
	Jakub Rutnicki	Civic Platform	24 July 2025	Present	Donald Tusk (Tusk III)
