= Paweł Graś =

Polish politician (born 1964)

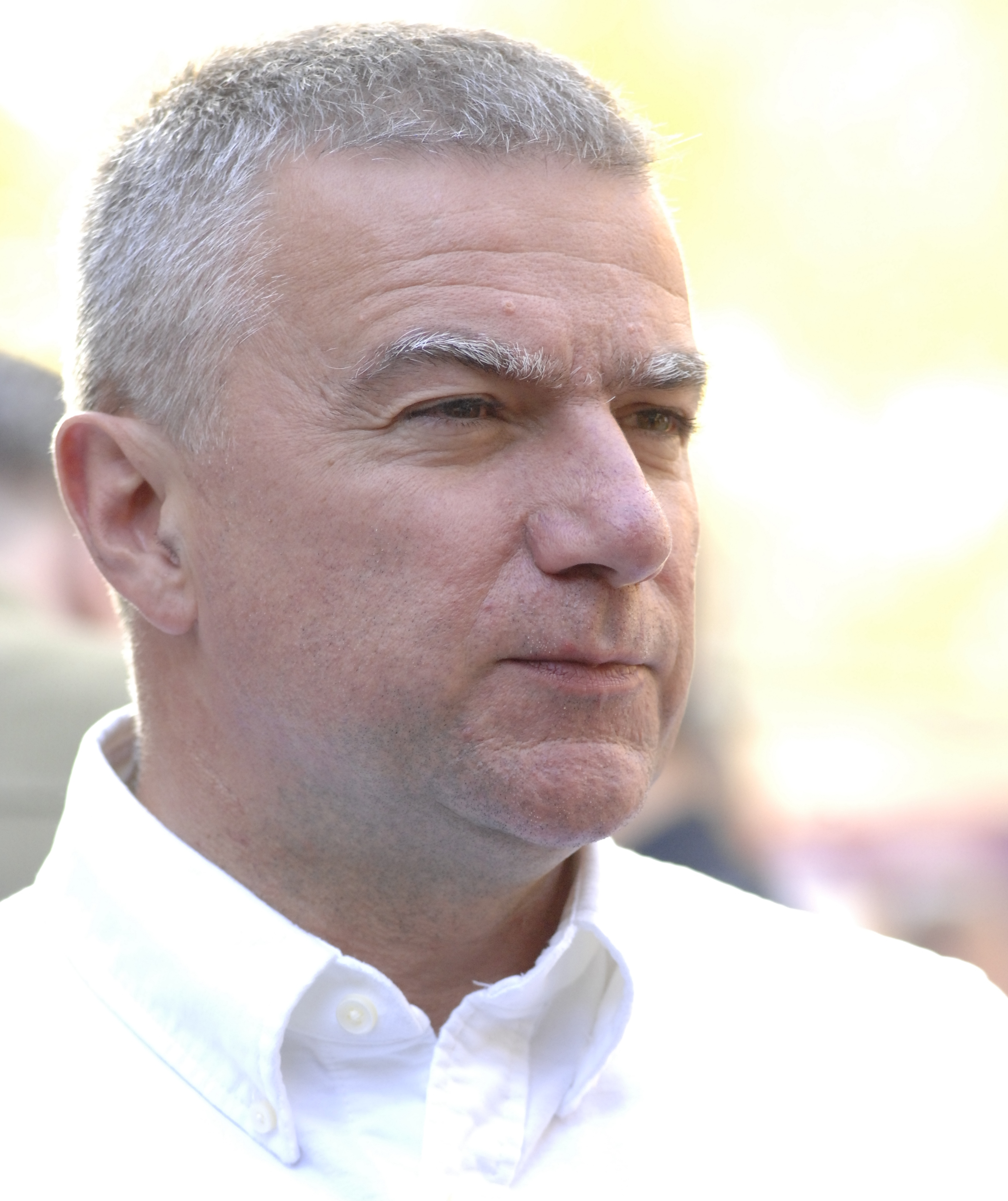

Member of the Sejm
- Incumbent
- Assumed office 25 September 2005
- Constituency: 12 – Chrzanów

Personal details
- Born: 23 February 1964 (age 62)
- Party: Civic Platform

Paweł Bolesław Graś (born 23 February 1964 in Kęty) is a Polish politician. He was elected to the Sejm on 21 October 2007, getting 35,779 votes in 12 Chrzanów district as a candidate from the Civic Platform list.

He was also a member of Sejm 1997-2001 and Sejm 2001-2005 and Sejm 2005-2007.

== See also ==
- Members of Polish Sejm 2005-2007
