= Bartosz Arłukowicz =

Polish politician

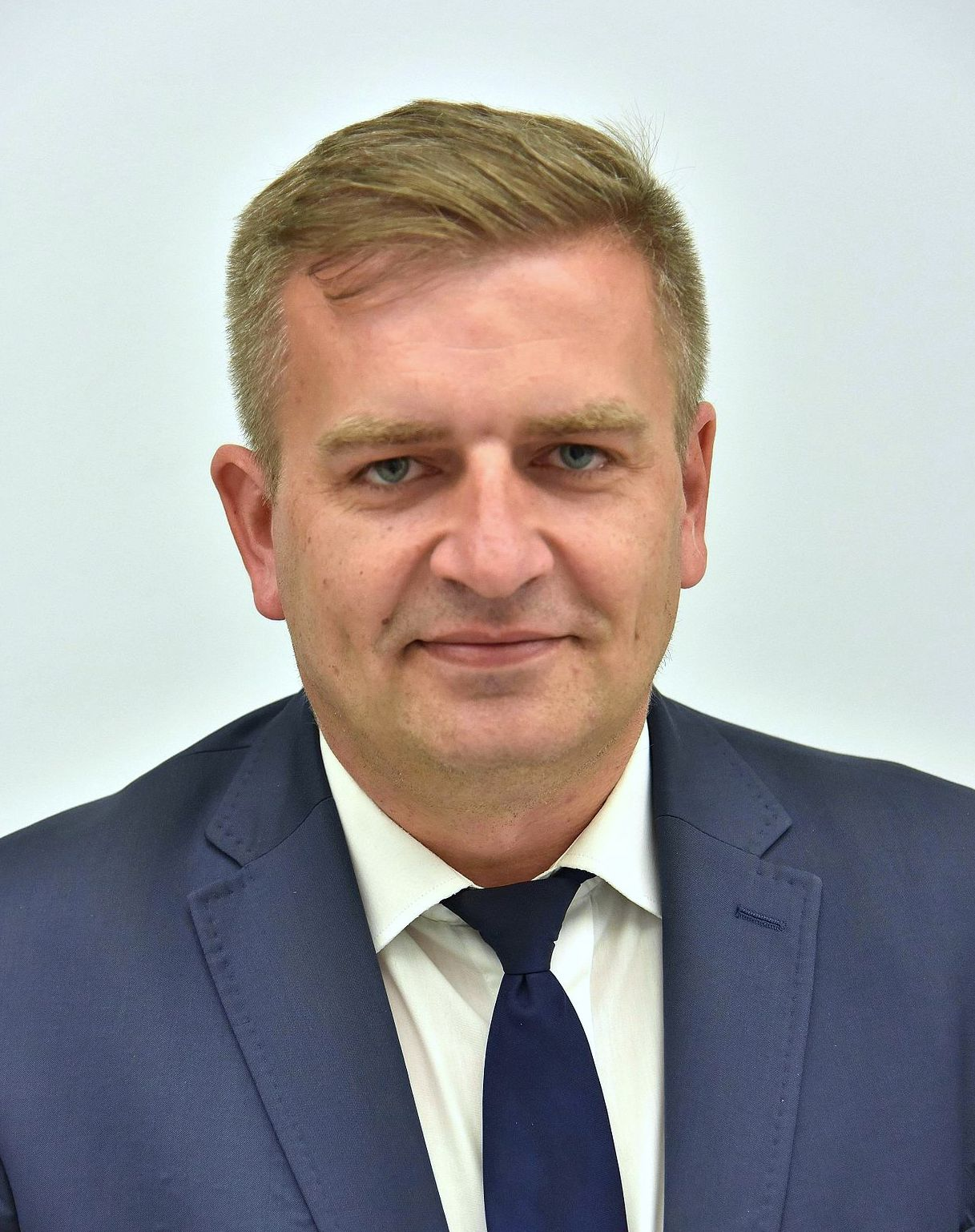

Minister of Health
- In office 18 November 2011 – 10 June 2015
- Prime Minister: Donald Tusk; Ewa Kopacz
- Preceded by: Ewa Kopacz
- Succeeded by: Marian Zembala

Member of the European Parliament
- Incumbent
- Assumed office 16 July 2024
- In office 2 July 2019 – 13 November 2023
- Constituency: Lubusz and West Pomeranian

Member of the Sejm
- In office 13 November 2023 – 16 July 2024
- Constituency: 40 – Koszalin
- In office 5 November 2007 – 2 July 2019
- Constituency: 41 – Szczecin

Personal details
- Born: 30 December 1971 (age 54) Resko, Poland
- Party: Democratic Left Alliance (2001-2004); Social Democracy of Poland (2004-2009); Civic Platform (since 2011)
- Other political affiliations: Left and Democrats (2007-2009); Civic Coalition (since 2019)
- Profession: Pediatrician

Bartosz Adam Arłukowicz (born 30 December 1971 in Resko) is a Polish politician and pediatrician. He served as a Minister of Health from 18 October 2011 to 10 June 2015 under Donald Tusk and then Ewa Kopacz and was a member of Sejm from 2007.

He served as a Member of the European Parliament from 2019 to 2023.

== Political career ==
=== Career in national politics ===
From 2004 Arłukowicz was a member of Social Democracy of Poland, then parliamentary group Social Democracy of Poland - New Left from April to December 2008, then Left Wing from 2009 to 2011 and then Labour United (its leader claims he became a member in 2009, Arłukowicz says he finally did not fill in the declaration). From 2009 till 2010 he was a vice-chairman of special parliamentary commission meant to investigate so-called gambling afera. After resigning he was installed on newly created chair Prime Minister's plenipotentiary responsible for encountering social exclusion.

In October 2011 Arłukowicz started his governmental career after previous minister Ewa Kopacz was chosen Marshal of the Sejm and his seat was liquidated. In 2013 he became a member of Civic Platform. In June 2015, he announced his resignation from ministerial function following the tape crisis (due to it three ministers and Marshall of the Sejm were forced to resign even though Arłukowicz was not personally involved or recorded). He was replaced by cardiac surgeon Marian Zembala.

=== Member of the European Parliament, 2019–present ===
In parliament, Arłukowicz serves on the Committee on the Environment, Public Health and Food Safety. From 2020 to 2021 he also chaired the Special Committee on Beating Cancer.

In addition to his committee assignments, Arłukowicz is part of the parliament's delegations for relations with the countries of Central America and to the Euro-Latin American Parliamentary Assembly.

In 2023, he resigned from parliament and was replaced by Witold Pahl.

== Bibliography ==
- Bartosz Arłukowicz's page on Sejm website
