= Adam Korol =

Polish rower

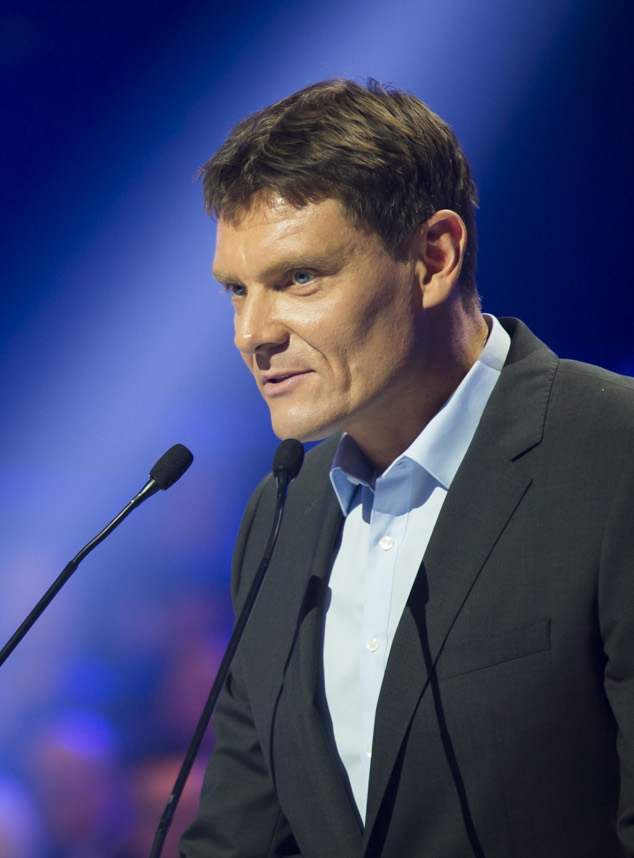

Personal information
- Full name: Adam Marek Korol
- Born: 20 August 1974 (age 51) Gdańsk, Poland
Medal record
Men's rowing
Representing Poland
Olympic Games
Gold medal – first place	2008 Beijing	Quadruple sculls
World Rowing Championships
Gold medal – first place	2005 Gifu	Quadruple sculls
Gold medal – first place	2006 Eton	Quadruple sculls
Gold medal – first place	2007 Munich	Quadruple sculls
Gold medal – first place	2009 Poznan	Quadruple sculls
Silver medal – second place	2002 Seville	Quadruple sculls
Bronze medal – third place	1998 Cologne	Double sculls
Bronze medal – third place	2003 Milan	Quadruple sculls
European Championships
Gold medal – first place	2010 Montemor-o-Velho	Quadruple sculls

Adam Marek Korol (born 20 August 1974) is a Polish rower and Civic Platform politician. He won a gold medal in quadruple sculls at the 2008 Summer Olympics. He was the Minister of Sport and Tourism from June 2015 to November 2015 and serves in the Sejm as of November 2015.

For his sport achievements, he received:
Knight's Cross of the Order of Polonia Restituta (5th Class) in 2008.
