= Ewa Kopacz =

Prime Minister of Poland from 2014 to 2015

Ewa Kopacz MEP
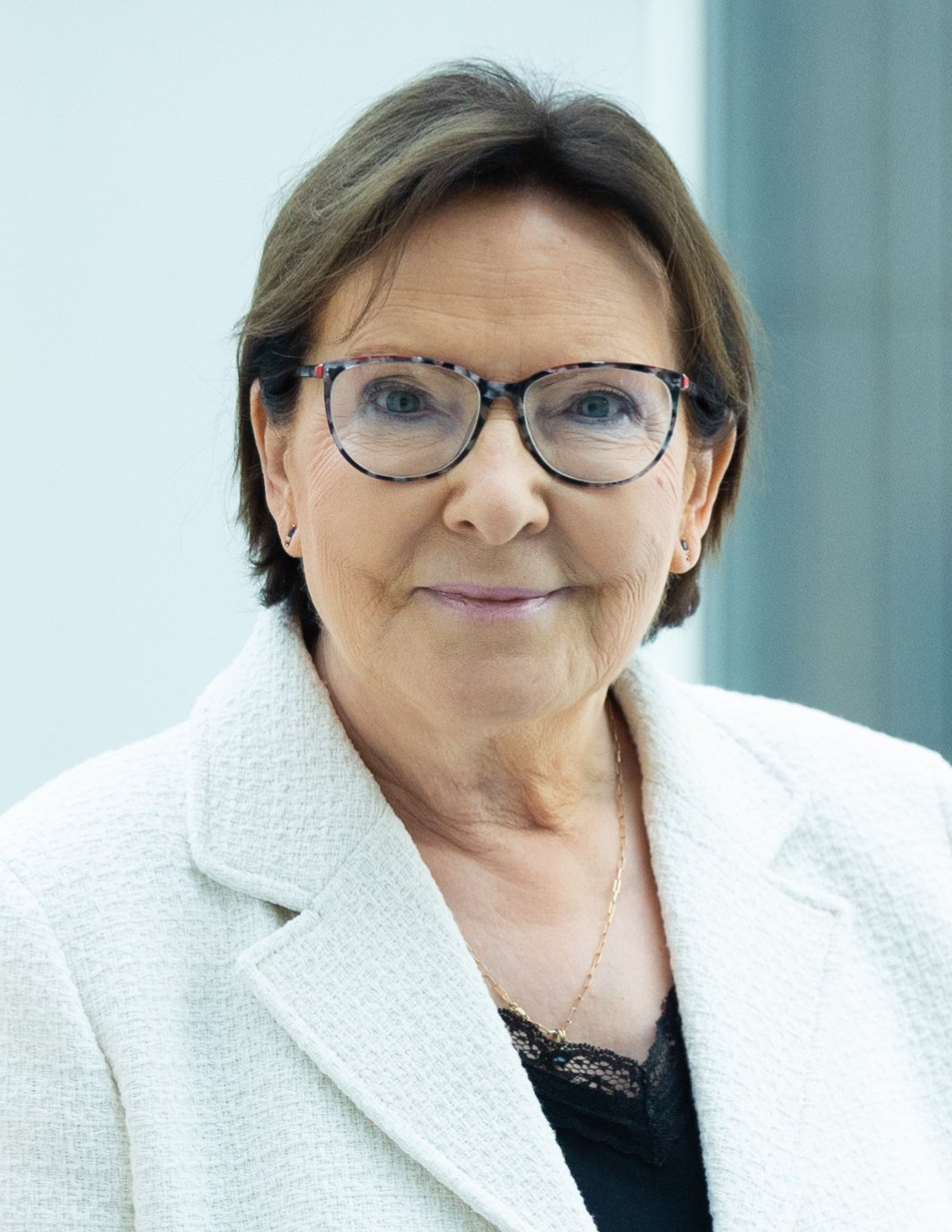
- Kopacz in 2024

Prime Minister of Poland
- In office 22 September 2014 – 16 November 2015
- President: Bronisław Komorowski; Andrzej Duda
- Deputy: Tomasz Siemoniak; Janusz Piechociński
- Preceded by: Donald Tusk
- Succeeded by: Beata Szydło

Vice-President of the European Parliament
- Incumbent
- Assumed office 3 July 2019 Serving with see list
- President: David Sassoli; Roberta Metsola
- Preceded by: Zdzisław Krasnodębski

Member of the European Parliament
- Incumbent
- Assumed office 2 July 2019
- Constituency: Greater Poland

Leader of the Civic Platform
- In office 8 November 2014 – 26 January 2016
- Secretary General: Paweł Graś; Andrzej Biernat
- Preceded by: Donald Tusk
- Succeeded by: Grzegorz Schetyna

Marshal of the Sejm
- In office 8 November 2011 – 22 September 2014
- Preceded by: Grzegorz Schetyna
- Succeeded by: Radosław Sikorski

Minister of Health
- In office 16 November 2007 – 8 November 2011
- Prime Minister: Donald Tusk
- Preceded by: Zbigniew Religa
- Succeeded by: Bartosz Arłukowicz

Member of Sejm
- In office 19 October 2001 – 4 June 2019

Personal details
- Born: Ewa Bożena Lis; 3 December 1956 (age 69) Skaryszew, Poland
- Party: United People's Party (before 1989); Freedom Union (1994–2001); Civic Platform (2001–2025); Civic Coalition (since 2025)
- Other political affiliations: European People's Party
- Spouse: Marek Kopacz (div. 2008)
- Children: 1
- Education: Medical University of Lublin
- Awards: Royal Norwegian Order of Merit Order of Saint-Charles Order of the Cross of Terra Mariana

Ewa Bożena Kopacz (Note: Polish pronunciation: [ˈɛva ˈkɔpat͡ʂ]) (née Lis; born 3 December 1956) is a Polish politician who has served as a Vice-President of the European Parliament since 2019. She previously was Marshal of the Sejm from 2011 to 2014, the first woman to hold the office, as well as Prime Minister of Poland from 2014 to 2015. In addition, Kopacz was Minister of Health from 2007 until 2011. Since 2001, she has been a member of Civic Platform, which she chaired from 2014 to 2016. Kopacz succeeded Donald Tusk as prime minister, becoming the second woman to hold the office after Hanna Suchocka (1992–1993). Her term as prime minister ended on 16 November 2015, when she was succeeded by Beata Szydło.

Prior to entering politics, Kopacz was a pediatrician and general practitioner. She was described as one of the leaders of the European Union during her tenure as prime minister. She was ranked as the world's 40th most powerful woman by Forbes magazine in 2015, placing her ahead of Queen Elizabeth II of the United Kingdom and American television personality Ellen DeGeneres.

== Early life ==
Ewa Kopacz was born in Skaryszew. She is the daughter of Mieczysław and Krystyna Lis. Her father was employed as a mechanic and her mother worked as a tailor. She was raised in the city of Radom, where she graduated from high school. In 1981 she graduated from the Medical University of Lublin. She did a residency in family medicine ("second-degree specialisation") with a focus on pediatrics ("first degree"). She worked at the clinics in the villages of Orońsko and Chlewiska, then town of Szydłowiec, where until 2001 she headed the local health care facility.

== Political career ==
In the 1980s, Kopacz joined the United People's Party. She entered active politics after her late husband, Marek Kopacz, a prosecutor, stood unsuccessfully for parliament.

In the 1990s, Kopacz joined the Freedom Union and chaired the party's structures in the province of Radom. In the local elections in 1998, the regional council elected her as the councilor for the Masovian Voivodship.

In 2001, Kopacz left the Freedom Union to join the newly established Civic Platform political party. She was then elected to the Parliament in 2005, where she became head of the Health Committee. She worked as the chairperson of the Civic Platform structures of Masovia.

=== Member of the Sejm ===
Kopacz was first elected as a deputy to the Sejm in 2001. She was subsequently re-elected in 2005, 2007 and 2011. In November 2011 she was elected the Marshal of the Sejm.

=== Minister of Health ===
In 2009 Kopacz gained some degree of international fame by requesting pharmaceutical companies to present the advantages of swine flu vaccines, and demanding they take full responsibility for the side effects. She advised the Polish government to wait until proper testing had been done on the vaccine before investing in it, citing the fact that seasonal flu exceeds the current WHO criteria for pandemic every year but there has been no declaration of a pandemic of this much more dangerous seasonal flu. The Polish government refused to purchase the vaccine in question.

=== Prime Minister of Poland ===
On 22 September 2014 Ewa Kopacz was sworn in as prime minister, after Donald Tusk resigned to take office as President of the European Council, and formed a cabinet. On 8 November 2014 she was sworn in as leader of the Civic Platform.

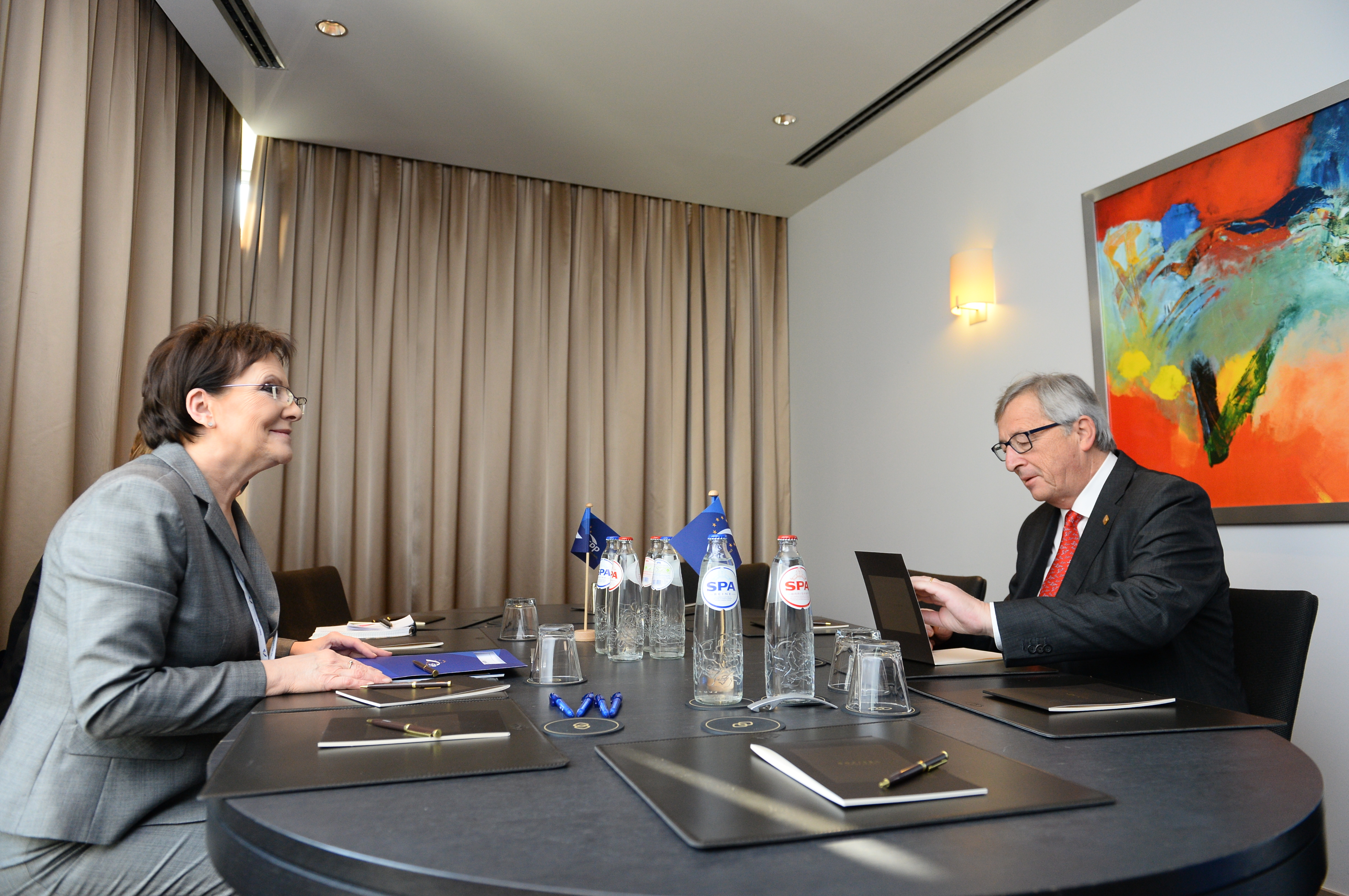
Ewa Kopacz with President of the European Commission Jean-Claude Juncker

In her first major policy speech as prime minister, Kopacz promised more continuity in Poland's foreign policy. She said her government would not stand for a break-up of neighboring Ukraine and would push for a greater U.S. military presence in Poland as a deterrent to possible Russian aggression. For domestic political reasons she decided to replace Foreign Minister Radosław Sikorski with her party rival Grzegorz Schetyna. Instead, Sikorski was elected Marshal of the Sejm.

At her first EU summit in October 2014, Kopacz managed to persuade the other Member States that Poland deserved lucrative concessions as part of a deal to cut European carbon emissions. After the European Commission opened infringement proceedings against Poland for violating particle pollution levels and was investigating reports that it has also exceeded limits on nitrogen oxides, Kopacz's government declared 2015 to be the Year of Improving Air Quality and backed a proposal to empower regional authorities to clamp down on pollution from vehicles and from the burning of coal and wood in homes.

Poland's 2014 local elections, a ballot expected to provide a solid show of support for Kopacz, saw her party instead attract fewer votes than the opposition for the first time in almost a decade.

As part of a cabinet reshuffle in June 2015, Kopacz purged three ministers from her government after the surprise defeat of President Bronislaw Komorowski, a party ally of Kopacz, in the presidential elections. She also demoted the official who oversees Poland's intelligence services. Instead, she appointed a group of relative political unknowns to her government in an effort to regain voters' trust and avoid defeat in the upcoming elections. The appointments included a former Olympic rower, Adam Korol, who was named sports and tourism minister, and Marian Zembala, a celebrated heart surgeon, who became the new minister for health.

In the national elections, Kopacz received 230 894 votes, which was the highest individual score in the country, and she received a mandate deputy of parliament VIII term. However, her party lost the elections. In accordance with the constitution, she resigned along with all other members of her cabinet at the first sitting of the newly elected Sejm. She remained in office until her successor Beata Szydło was sworn in on 16 November 2015.

=== Member of the European Parliament ===
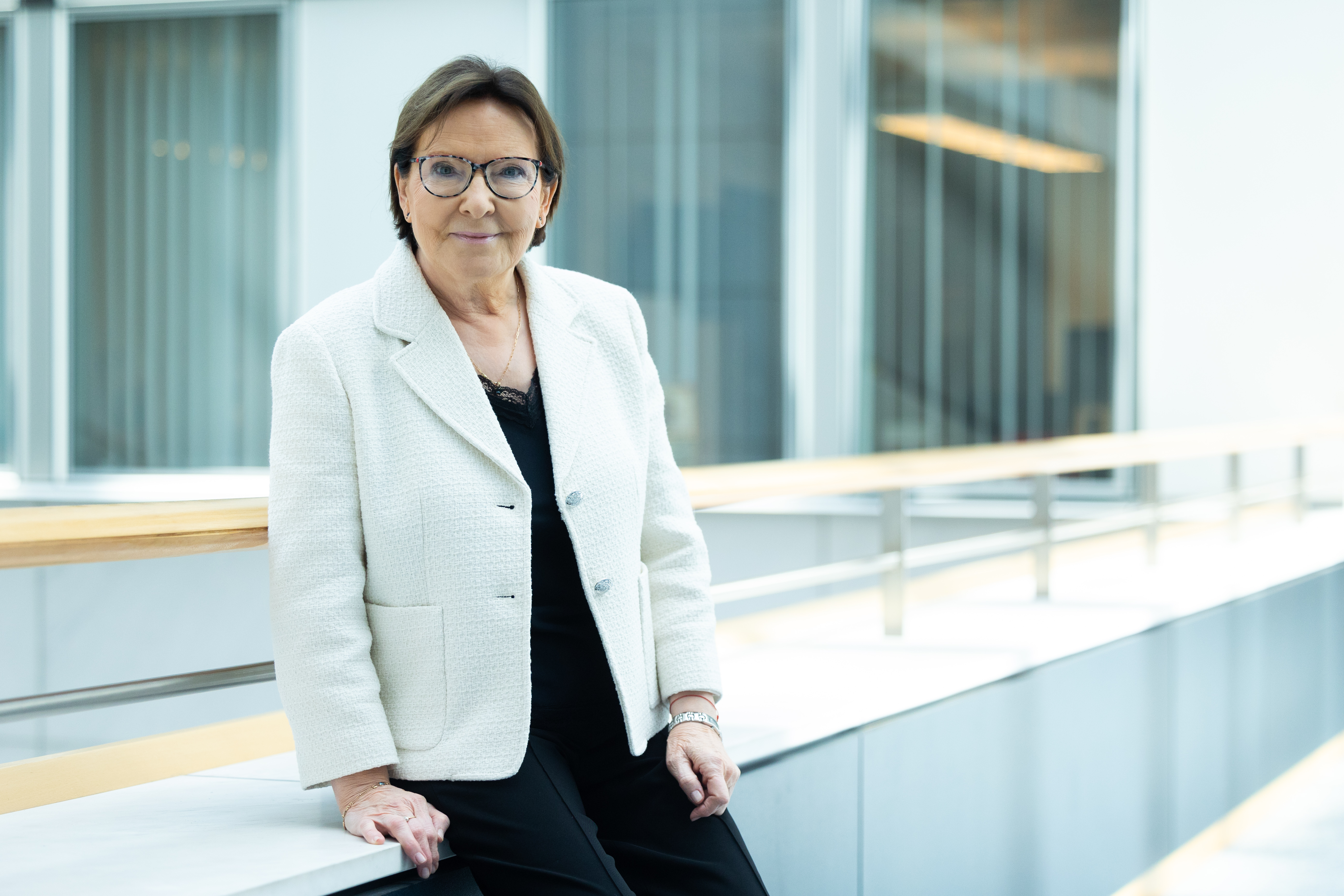
Kopacz in 2024

Since becoming a Member of the European Parliament following the 2019 European elections, Kopacz has been serving as one of its Vice-Presidents; in this capacity, she has been part of the Parliament's leadership under Presidents David Sassoli (2019–2022) and Roberta Metsola (since 2022). Within the centre-right European People's Party Group (EPP), she is part of the leadership team around chairman Manfred Weber. She later also joined the Special Committee on Beating Cancer (2020) and the Special Committee on the COVID-19 pandemic (2022).

In addition to her committee assignments, Kopacz is a member of the MEPs Against Cancer group.

== Personal life ==
When Tusk's sister Sonia suffered a stroke in 2005, Kopacz became involved in her treatment, travelling to hospitals around Poland with her.

She was married to Marek Kopacz until 2008. and has a daughter, Katarzyna from her marriage.

== Honours and awards ==
Norway

- Grand Cross of the Royal Norwegian Order of Merit (2012)

Monaco

- Commander of the Order of Saint Charles (2012)

Estonia

- 1st Class of the Order of the Cross of Terra Mariana (2014)

== See also ==
- Cabinet of Ewa Kopacz
- History of Poland (1989–present)
- List of political parties in Poland
- List of politicians in Poland
- Politics of Poland

Political offices
Preceded by Zbigniew Religa	Minister of Health; 2007–2011	Succeeded by Bartosz Arłukowicz
Preceded by Grzegorz Schetyna	Marshal of the Sejm; 2011–2014	Succeeded by Radosław Sikorski
Preceded by Donald Tusk	Prime Minister of Poland; 2014–2015	Succeeded by Beata Szydło
Party political offices
Preceded by Donald Tusk	Leader of the Civic Platform; 2014–2016	Succeeded by Grzegorz Schetyna
