= Andrzej Biernat =

Polish politician (born 1960)

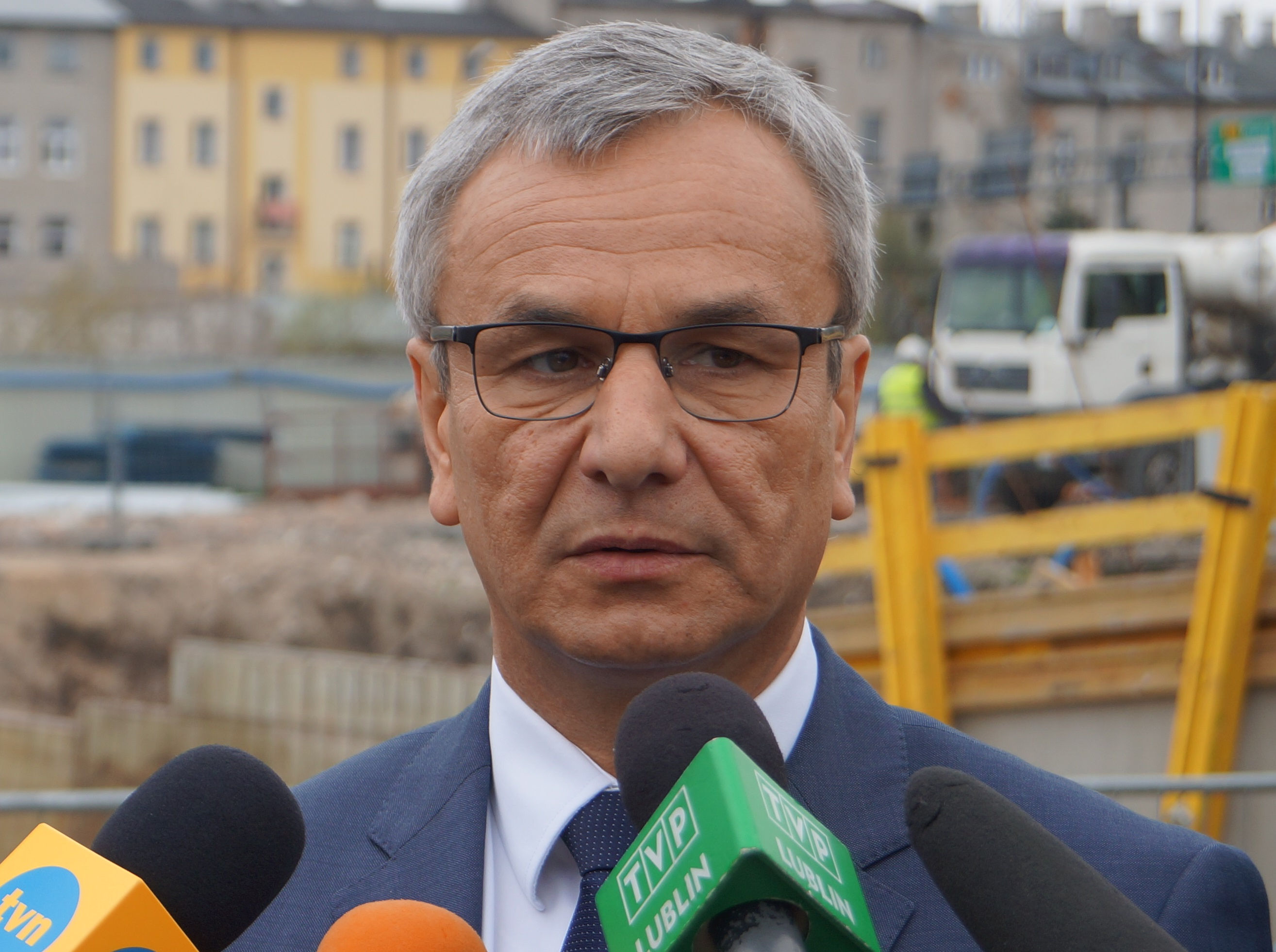

Minister of Sport and Tourism
- In office 27 November 2013 – 15 June 2015

Member of Sejm
- In office 18 October 2005 – 11 November 2015

Personal details
- Born: 11 August 1960 (age 65) Urzędów
- Party: Civic Platform

Andrzej Zbigniew Biernat (born 11 August 1960) is a Polish politician and a member of the Civic Platform party. He served as Minister of Sport and Tourism from November 2013 to June 2015, and he has been a member of the Sejm since September 2005. Prior to his involvement in politics, he worked as teacher in an elementary school and the director of a sports centre in Konstantynów Łódzki.

He was first elected to the Sejm on 25 September 2005, getting 6244 votes in 11 Sieradz district, from the Civic Platform list.

== See also ==
- Members of Polish Sejm 2005-2007
