= 2008 Polish People's Party leadership election =

- 8 November 2008
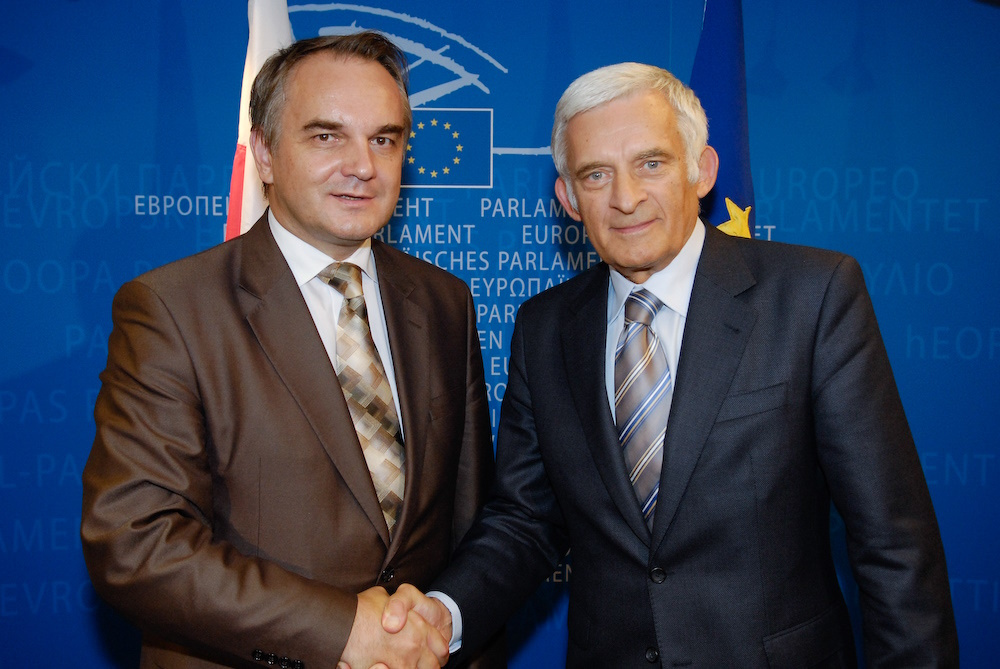

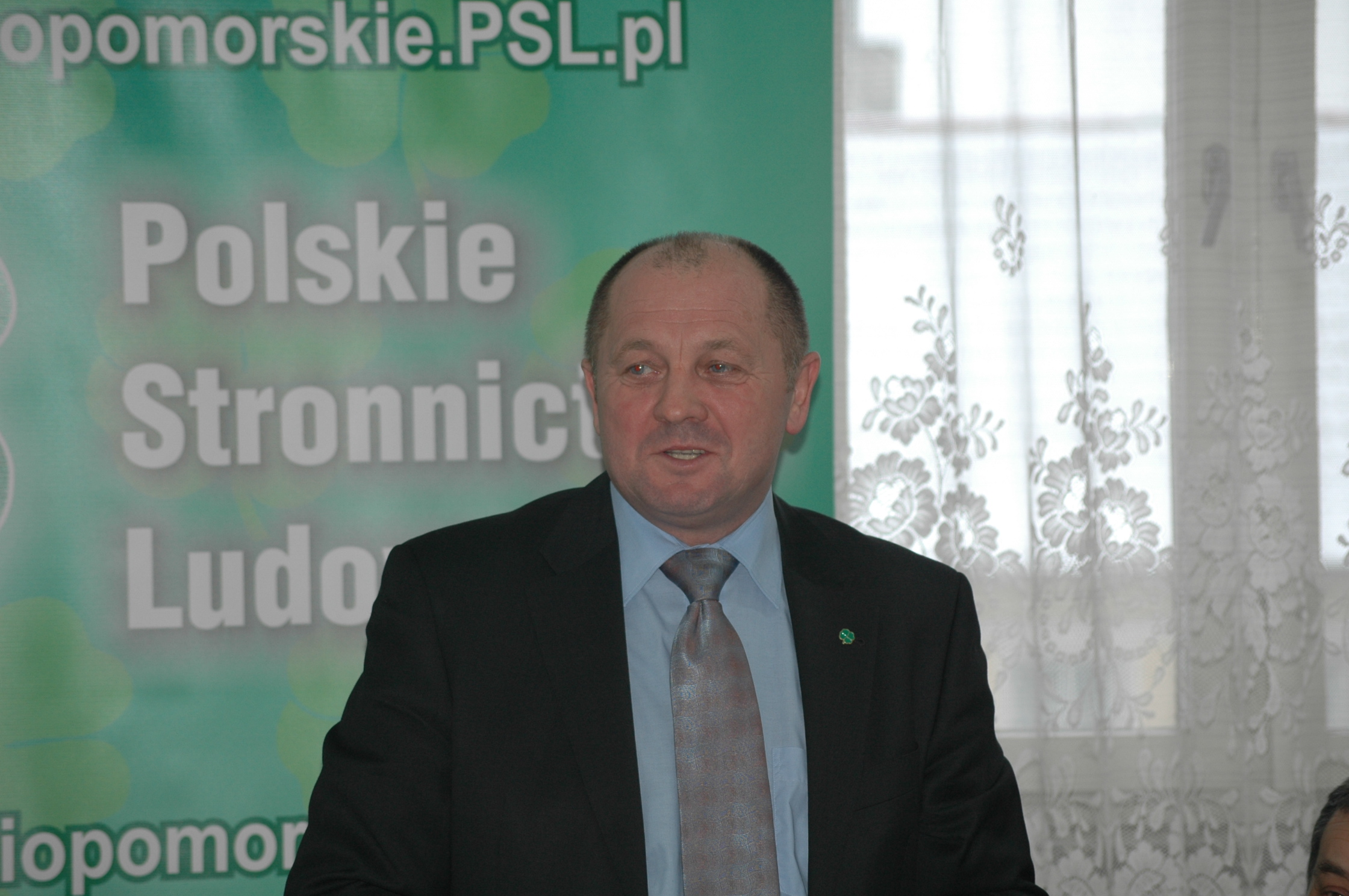
Candidate	Waldemar Pawlak	Marek Sawicki
Popular vote	677	135
Percentage	83.37%	16.63%
Chairman before election
Waldemar Pawlak
Elected Chairman
Waldemar Pawlak

The 2008 Polish People's Party leadership election was held on 8 November 2008 at the 10th Polish People's Party Congress in Warsaw. Waldemar Pawlak was re-elected as the party chairman, defeating Marek Sawicki.

== Election ==
The election was held on 8 November 2008 at the 10th Polish People's Party Congress in Warsaw. Despite speculation that a younger party member, such as Jolanta Fedak, would challenge incumbent chairman Waldemar Pawlak, Pawlak instead came to face Marek Sawicki. Sawicki contested the election due to the party's by-law requiring two candidates in a leadership election. He did not seriously campaign for the position, and outright endorsed Pawlak before the vote. Pawlak received the vote of 83% of voting delegates, decisively defeating Sawicki.

== Results ==
=== Party chairman ===
Candidate	Vote	%
Waldemar Pawlak ✓	677	83.37
Marek Sawicki	135	16.63
Total	812	97.25
Abstain	23	2.75
Blank/Invalid	23	2.75
Total votes	835	100.00
Source: TVN 24

== Aftermath ==
The strong result for Waldemar Pawlak was considered an indicator of his strong position in the party in 2008. However, in the 2012 leadership election, Pawlak was narrowly defeated by challenger Janusz Piechociński.
