= 2021 Polish People's Party leadership election =

Polish election 2021

- 4 December 2021
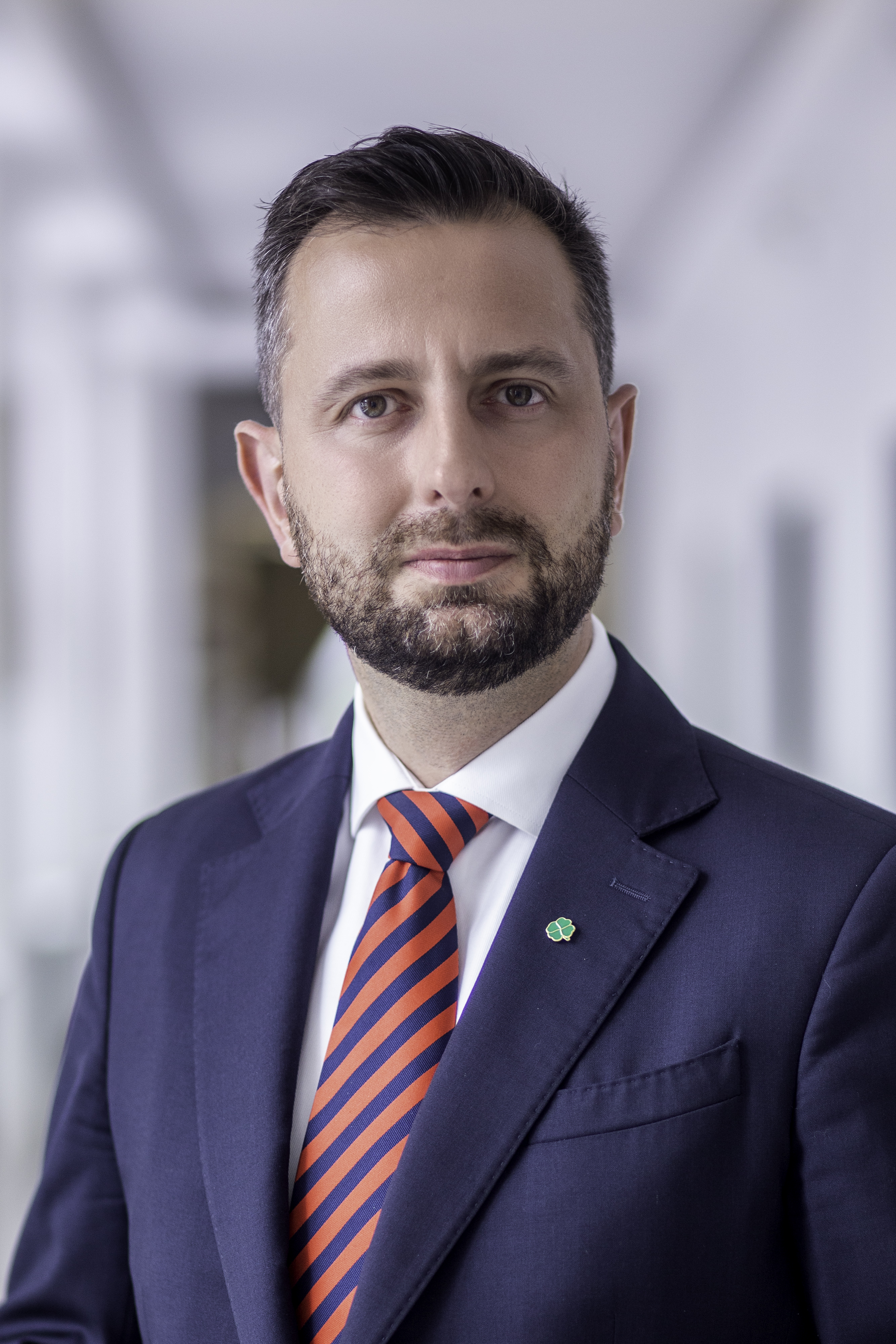

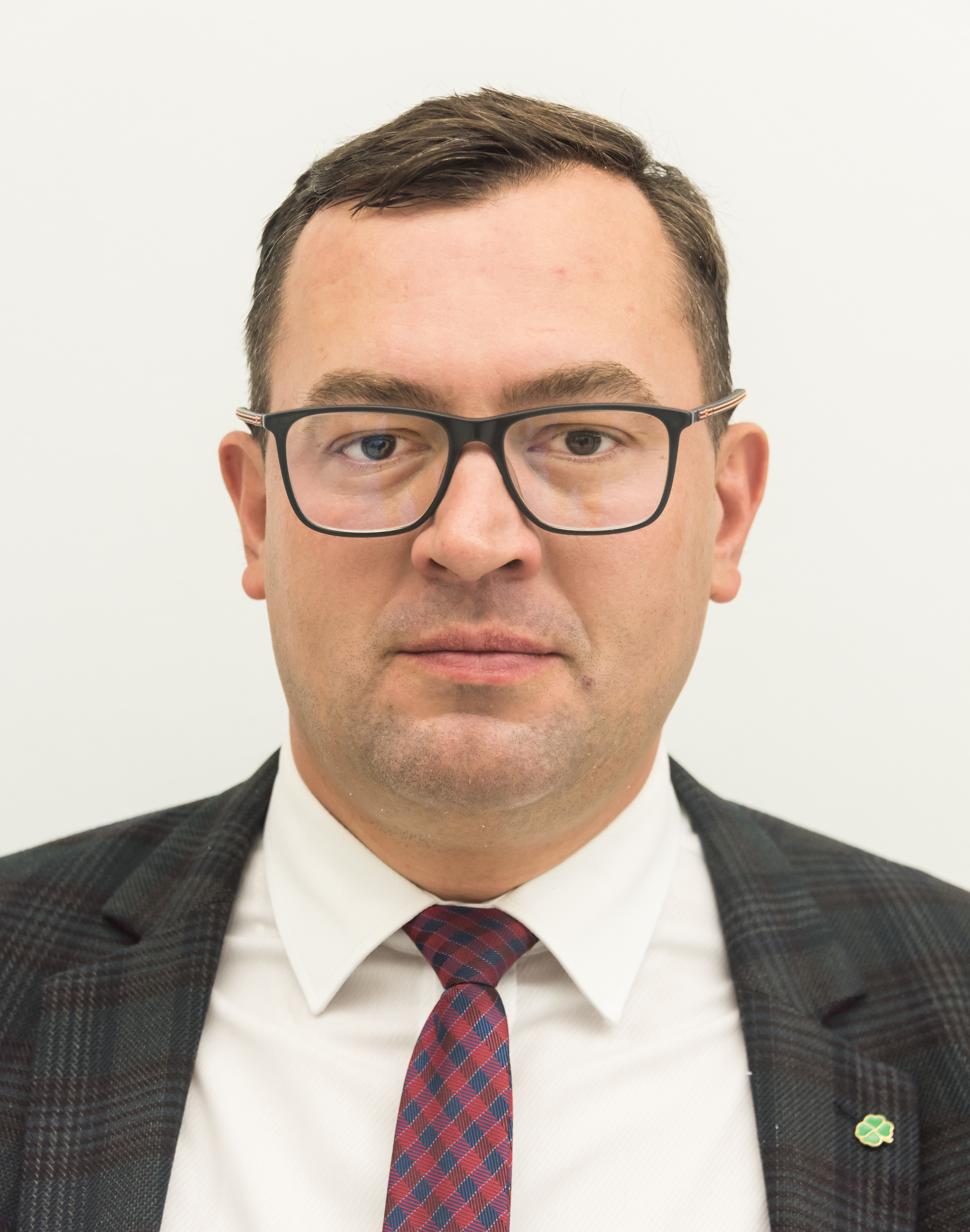
Candidate	Władysław Kosiniak-Kamysz	Stefan Krajewski
Popular vote	742	87
Percentage	89.09%	10.44%
Chairman before election
Władysław Kosiniak-Kamysz
Elected Chairman
Władysław Kosiniak-Kamysz

The 2021 Polish People's Party leadership election was held on 4 December 2021 at the 13th Polish People's Party Congress in Warsaw. Incumbent leader Władysław Kosiniak-Kamysz was re-elected to the position in a landslide victory. He defeated Stefan Krajewski for the position.

== Election ==
The election was held on 4 December 2021 at the 13th Polish People's Party Congress in Warsaw. The congress was originally planned for Autumn 2020, but was delayed due to the COVID-19 pandemic in Poland. Incumbent chairman Władysław Kosiniak-Kamysz was re-elected with 89% of the vote, defeating Stefan Krajewski. Waldemar Pawlak was elected Head of the Supreme Council in a runoff against Dariusz Klimczak, defeating him narrowly with 52% of the votes.

== Results ==
=== Party chairman ===
Candidate	Vote	%
Władysław Kosiniak-Kamysz ✓	742	89.08
Stefan Krajewski	87	10.44
Total	829	99.52
Abstain	0	—
Blank/Invalid	4	0.48
Total votes	833	100.00
Source: Dziennik Gazeta Prawna

=== Head of the Supreme Council ===
Candidate	1st round		2nd round	
Candidate	Vote	%	Vote	%
Waldemar Pawlak ✓	251	31.30	408	51.97
Dariusz Klimczak	235	29.30	373	47.52
Piotr Zgorzelski	224	27.93	Eliminated	
Andrzej Grzyb	92	11.47	Eliminated	
Total	802	100.00	781	99.49
Abstain	0	—	0	—
Blank/Invalid	0	—	4	0.51
Total votes	802	100.00	785	100.00
Source: Polish Press Agency

== Aftermath ==
After his election, Kosiniak-Kamysz declared the intention to create a centrist bloc, postulating cooperation within the opposition against the Law and Justice government. The party later successfully formed the centrist Third Way electoral alliance with Poland 2050 for the 2023 parliamentary election, although it disbanded shortly after the 2025 presidential election.
