= 2004 Polish People's Party leadership election =

Polish election 2004

- 16 March 2004
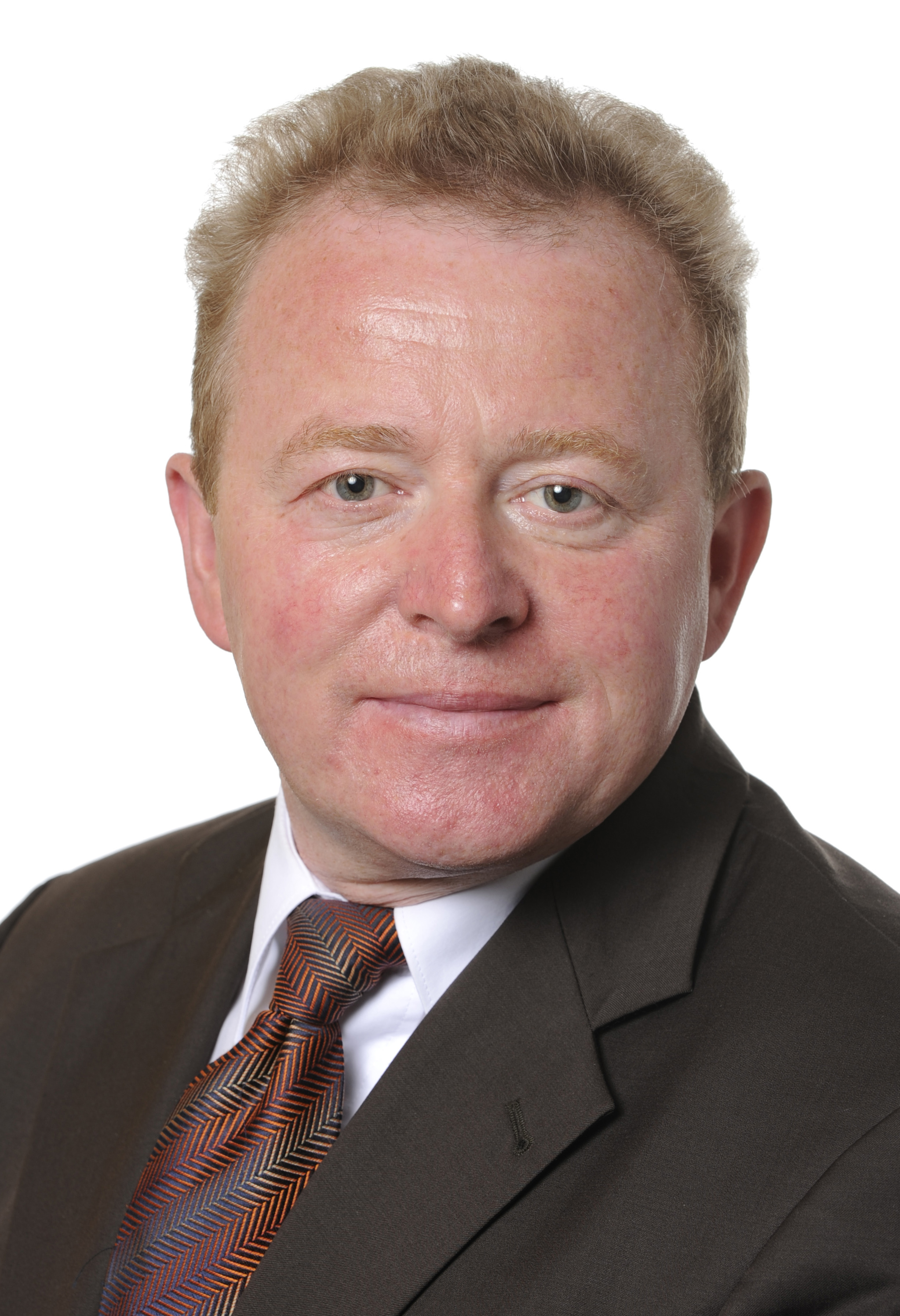

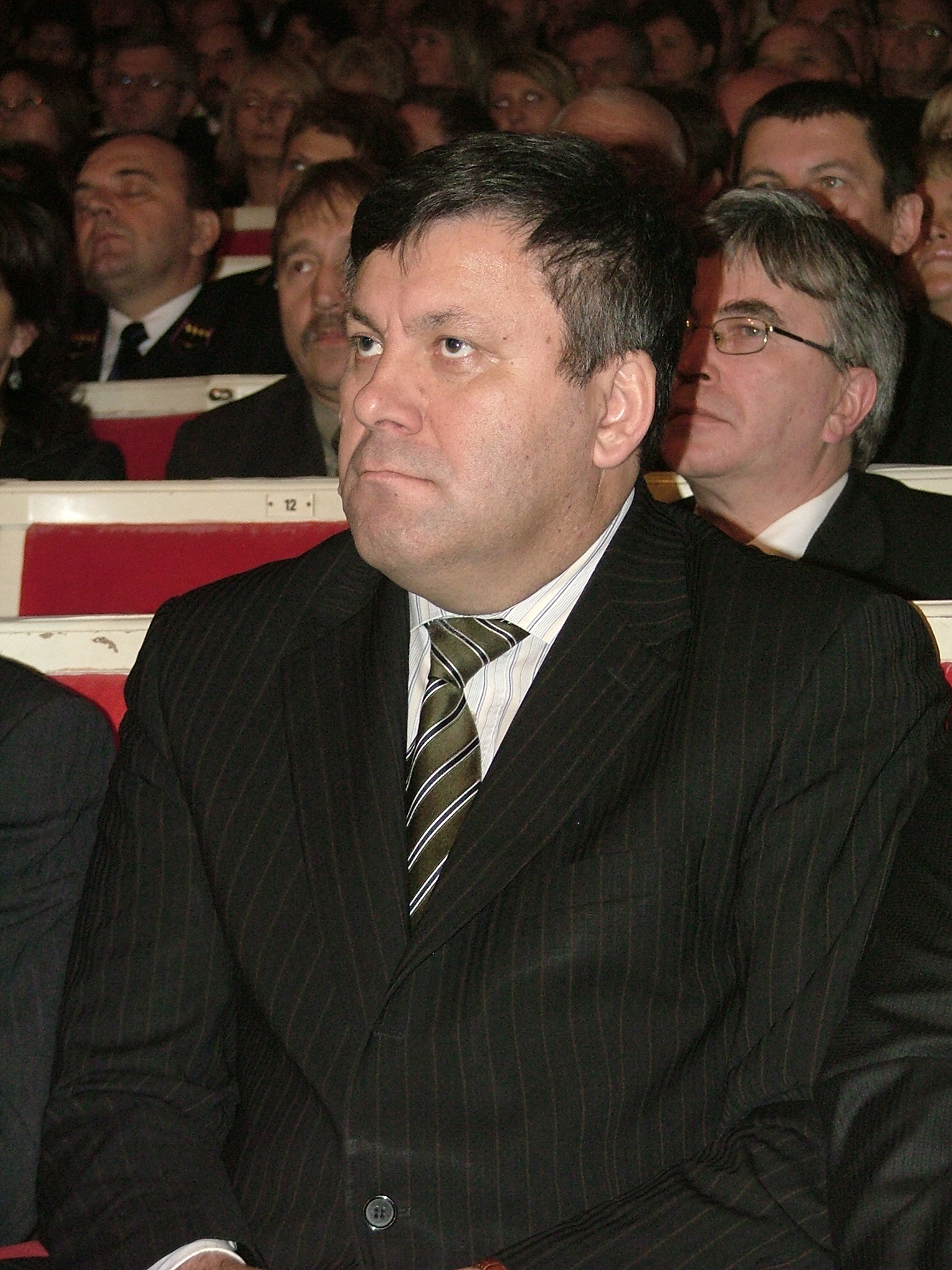
Candidate	Janusz Wojciechowski	Janusz Piechociński
Popular vote	412	329
Percentage	54.35%	43.40%
Chairman before election
Jarosław Kalinowski
Elected Chairman
Janusz Wojciechowski

The 2004 Polish People's Party leadership election was held on 16 March 2004 at the 8th Polish People's Party Congress in Warsaw. Janusz Wojciechowski was elected as the party chairman, defeating Janusz Piechociński.

== Election ==
The election was held on 16 March 2004 at the 8th Polish People's Party Congress in Warsaw. Janusz Wojciechowski defeated Janusz Piechociński with 54% of the vote.

== Results ==
=== Party chairman ===
Candidate	Vote	%
Janusz Wojciechowski ✓	412	54.35
Janusz Piechociński	329	43.40
Total	741	97.76
Abstain	17	2.24
Blank/Invalid	17	2.24
Total votes	758	100.00
Source: Wirtualna Polska
