= Stanisław Kalemba =

Polish politician

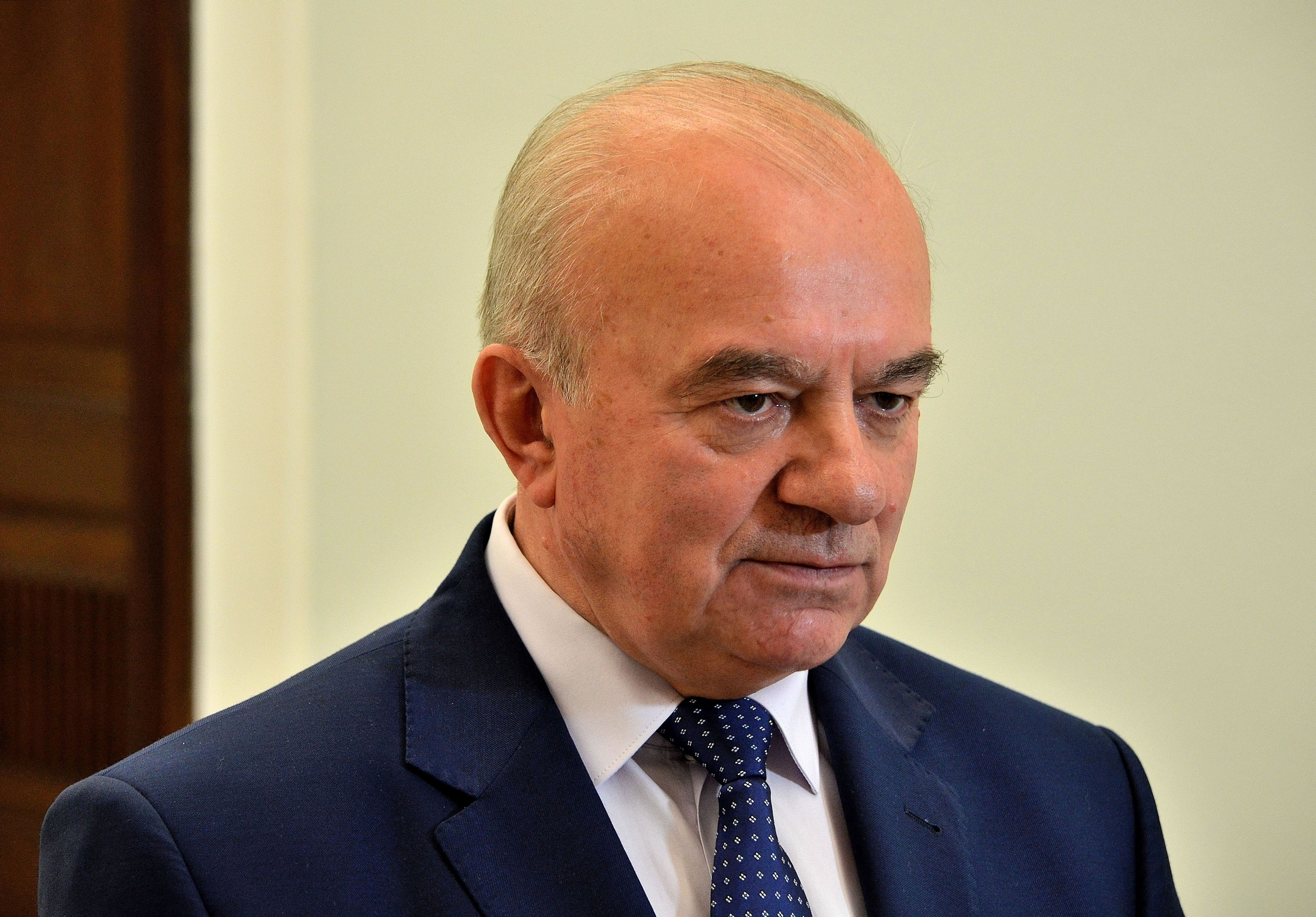

Minister of Agriculture and Rural Development
- In office 31 July 2012 – 17 March 2014
- President: Bronisław Komorowski
- Prime Minister: Donald Tusk
- Preceded by: Marek Sawicki
- Succeeded by: Marek Sawicki

Member of the Sejm
- In office 25 November 1991 – 11 November 2015

Personal details
- Born: 25 October 1947 (age 78) Piekary, Poland
- Party: Polish People's Party

Stanisław Kalemba (born 25 October 1947), is a Polish politician. He was elected to Sejm on 25 September 2005, getting 7,830 votes in 38 Piła district as a candidate from the Polish People's Party list.

He was also a member of Sejm 1991–1993, Sejm 1993–1997, Sejm 1997–2001, and Sejm 2001–2005.

== See also ==
- Members of Polish Sejm 2005–2007
