= Władysław Kosiniak-Kamysz =

Polish physician and politician (born 1981)

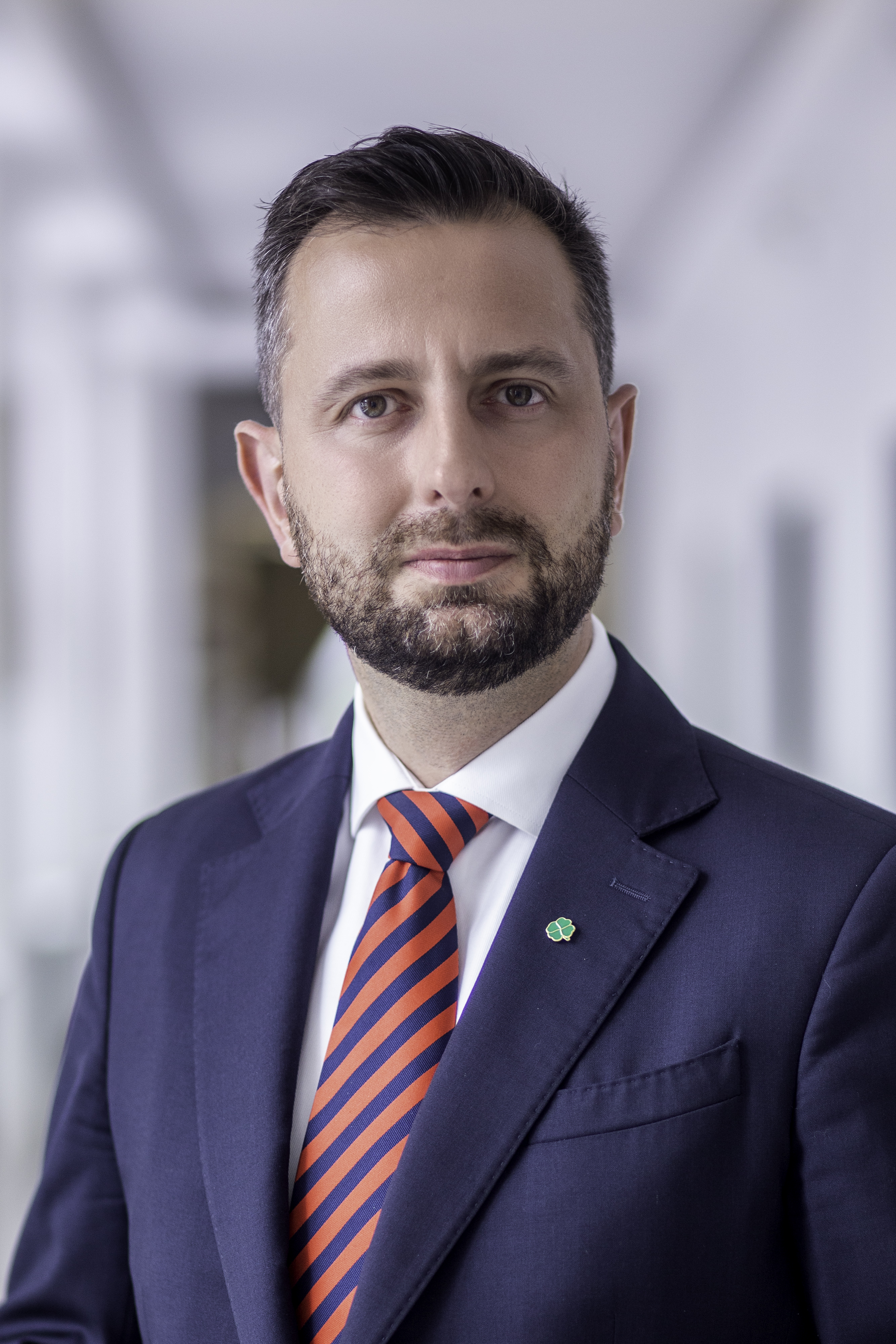
- Kosiniak-Kamysz in 2022

Deputy Prime Minister of Poland
- Incumbent
- Assumed office 13 December 2023 Serving with Krzysztof Gawkowski and Radosław Sikorski
- Prime Minister: Donald Tusk
- Preceded by: Jarosław Kaczyński

Minister of National Defence
- Incumbent
- Assumed office 13 December 2023
- Prime Minister: Donald Tusk
- Preceded by: Mariusz Błaszczak

Leader of the Polish People's Party
- Incumbent
- Assumed office 7 November 2015
- Deputy: Krzysztof Hetman; Adam Jarubas; Dariusz Klimczak; Urszula Pasławska; Adam Struzik
- Secretary: Andrzej Grzyb; Piotr Zgorzelski
- Parliamentary Leader: Jan Bury; Himself
- Preceded by: Janusz Piechociński

Parliamentary Leader of Polish Coalition
- Incumbent
- Assumed office 8 February 2018
- Deputy: Marek Sawicki (PSL); Jarosław Sachajko (K'15); Jacek Tomczak (UED); Jacek Protasiewicz (UED)
- Preceded by: Himself (As Parliamentary Leader of Polish People's Party)

Parliamentary Leader of Polish People's Party
- In office 12 November 2015 – 8 February 2018
- Leader: Himself
- Preceded by: Jan Bury
- Succeeded by: Himself (As Parliamentary Leader of Polish Coalition)

Member of the Sejm
- Incumbent
- Assumed office 12 November 2015
- Constituency: 15 - Tarnów

Minister of Labour and Social Policy
- In office 18 November 2011 – 16 November 2015
- Prime Minister: Donald Tusk; Ewa Kopacz
- Preceded by: Jolanta Fedak
- Succeeded by: Elżbieta Rafalska

Personal details
- Born: 10 August 1981 (age 45) Kraków, Poland
- Party: Polish People's Party; Polish Coalition
- Spouse(s): Agnieszka Kosiniak-Kamysz (m. 2009; div. 2016) Paulina Wojas (m. 2019)
- Children: 3
- Education: Jagiellonian University
- Website: kosiniakkamysz.pl

Władysław Marcin Kosiniak-Kamysz (Note: Polish pronunciation: [vwaˈdɘ.swaf ˈmar.t͡ɕin kɔ.ɕi.ɲakˈka.mɘʂ]) (born 10 August 1981) is a Polish physician and politician, who has served as the Deputy Prime Minister of Poland, and Minister of National Defence since 2023. He has also served as the chairman of the Polish People's Party (PSL) since 2015. From 2011 to 2015, he was Minister of Labour and Social Affairs in the governments of Donald Tusk and Ewa Kopacz. He was a candidate for president in 2020.

== Early life ==
=== Family ===
Kosiniak-Kamysz was born in Kraków in 1981, with his family originating from Siedliszowice, a village in Lesser Poland. He was brought up in the tradition of the folk movement. His father, Andrzej Kosiniak-Kamysz, a doctor and politician, served as Minister of Health and Social Welfare under the first non-communist government of Tadeusz Mazowiecki where he waged a constant struggle to ensure that in a situation of a constant lack of resources, health care at a technological level began to catch up with the West. His uncle is Zenon Kosiniak-Kamysz, politician and diplomat. His paternal grandfather and namesake, Władysław, born at the beginning of the First World War, served as a soldier in the 13th Wilno Uhlan Regiment and Farmers' Battalions during the Second World War. After the war, he returned to his hometown of Bieniaszowice, where he ran his farm next to the mouth of the Dunajec to the Vistula, with his grandmother.

=== Education ===
He studied in Kraków, where his parents moved. Kosiniak-Kamysz attended the Jan III Sobieski High School, Kraków. He subsequently studied medical studies at the Jagiellonian University Medical College until 2006. He became an assistant at the Department of Internal Medicine and Rural Medicine of the Jagiellonian University. In 2010, Kosiniak-Kamysz obtained his doctorate in medical science along with Tomasz Guzik. He received his doctorate based on the thesis labelled "The relationship of gene variation encoding GTP cyclohydrolase with the function of vascular endothelium in patients with type 2 diabetes", in which he studied the genetic determinants of diabetes. Kosiniak-Kamysz conducted scientific research, amongst others at the Emory University School of Medicine in Atlanta.

He started his first job at the Department of Internal Diseases and Rural Medicine of the Collegium Medicum of the Jagiellonian University, which he held a medical internship there. Throughout his studies, Kosiniak-Kamysz was a volunteer of the Volunteer Association of Saint Elijah operated at the Church of the Visitation of the Blessed Virgin Mary, Kraków.

== Political career ==
Kosiniak-Kamysz has always been associated with the Polish People's Party. He co-founded the PSL youth wing - Young People's Forum. Together they represented the people in TVP "Młodzież Kontra", in which they interviewed politicians. In this way, they gained their first skills in politics. Kosiniak-Kamysz took part in 12 electoral campaigns of the Polish People's Party. This was the first time during the 2000 presidential election when he supported Jarosław Kalinowski's organisation by issuing leaflets, hanging posters and collecting signatures for electoral lists.

In the 2010 local elections, Władysław Kosiniak-Kamysz received 763 votes. Since Jacek Majchrowski was the mayor of Kraków, he was able to take his seat in the city council of Krakow.

On 18 August 2011 he was appointed as Minister of Labor and Social Affairs in Donald Tusk's second cabinet. He served in this post until 16 November 2015.

In the 2015 parliamentary elections, the PSL and Civic Platform lost their parliamentary majority, and since then have been in the opposition. Due to the poor election result and because he did not get a mandate, Janusz Piechociński resigned as party chairman, and Kosiniak-Kamysz succeeded him on 7 November 2015. In 2019, the PSL jointed to the Polish Coalition with political movement Kukiz'15 and political party Union of European Democrats. In 2019 parliamentary election, he received 33 784 votes.

He was a candidate in the 2020 presidential election; in some opinion polls, he was ranked in second place for the first round of the election, which would have qualified him for the second round of the election; though the incumbent president at the time, Andrzej Duda, had much more (about 30%) support in the polls. Kosiniak-Kamysz received 2.36% of the first-round vote, thus being disqualified for the second-round vote.

Following the 2023 parliamentary election and the subsequent formation of Donald Tusk's third government, Kosiniak-Kamysz was appointed minister of national defence and deputy prime minister on 13 December.

In May 2024, Kosiniak-Kamysz attracted some criticism after revealing that he has had an emergency backpack at the ready since Russia's invasion of Ukraine in February 2022, with some saying this did not send a reassuring message about Poland's security. Kosiniak-Kamysz claimed his comments were taken out of context, posting on X that "Preparedness for crisis situations is not only an obligation, but also our responsibility."

In August 2024, he stated in an interview that Ukraine would not enter the European Union until the issue of the exhumation of the Polish victims of the Volhynian Genocide and their proper remembrance is resolved. His words came as a reaction to Ukrainian Foreign Minister Dmytro Kuleba who suggested that this issue should be left for historians.

In March 2026, Kosiniak-Kamysz held a personal meeting with U.S President Donald Trump. The information about the meeting was revealed in October the same year by Gazeta Wyborcza amid allegations that President Trump wanted to persuade Kosiniak-Kamysz to leave the ruling coalition government in Poland and form a new government with the right-wing opposition. The statement from Polish government officials rejected these allegations adding that the meeting concerned internal national issues with the details of the meeting remaining confidential.

== Personal life ==
He divorced his first wife in 2016. He married Paulina Kosiniak-Kamysz in 2019, with whom he has two daughters and a son.

He is Catholic.

== Notes ==
Political offices
Preceded by Jolanta Fedak	Minister of Labour and Social Policy; 2011–2015	Succeeded by Elżbieta Rafalska
Preceded by Jarosław Kaczyński	Deputy Prime Minister of Poland; 2023–present With: Krzysztof Gawkowski	Incumbent
Preceded by Mariusz Błaszczak	Minister of National Defence; 2023–present	Incumbent
Party political offices
Preceded by Janusz Piechociński	Chairman of the Polish People's Party; 2015–present	Incumbent
