= 2012 Polish People's Party leadership election =

Polish election 2012

- 17 November 2012
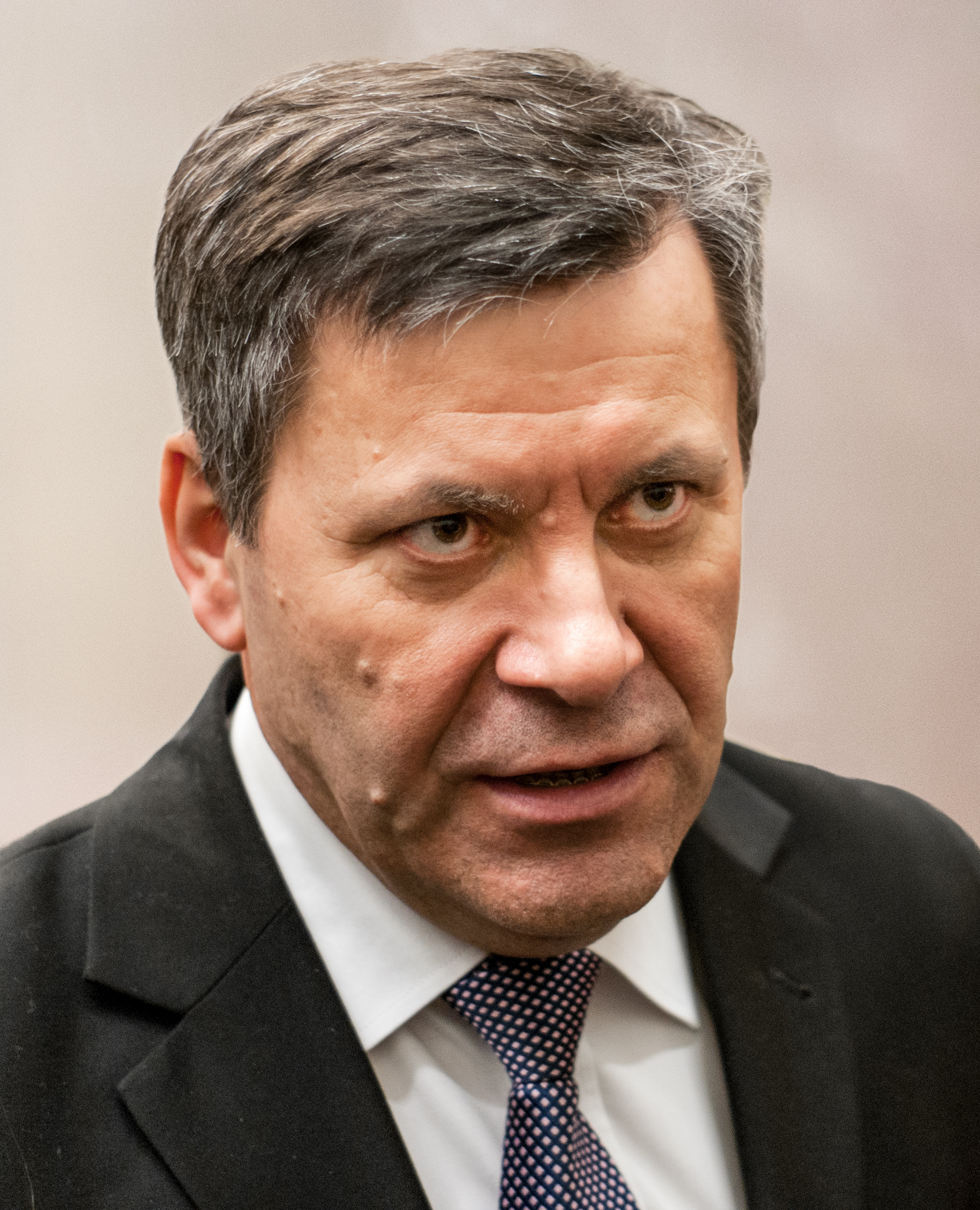

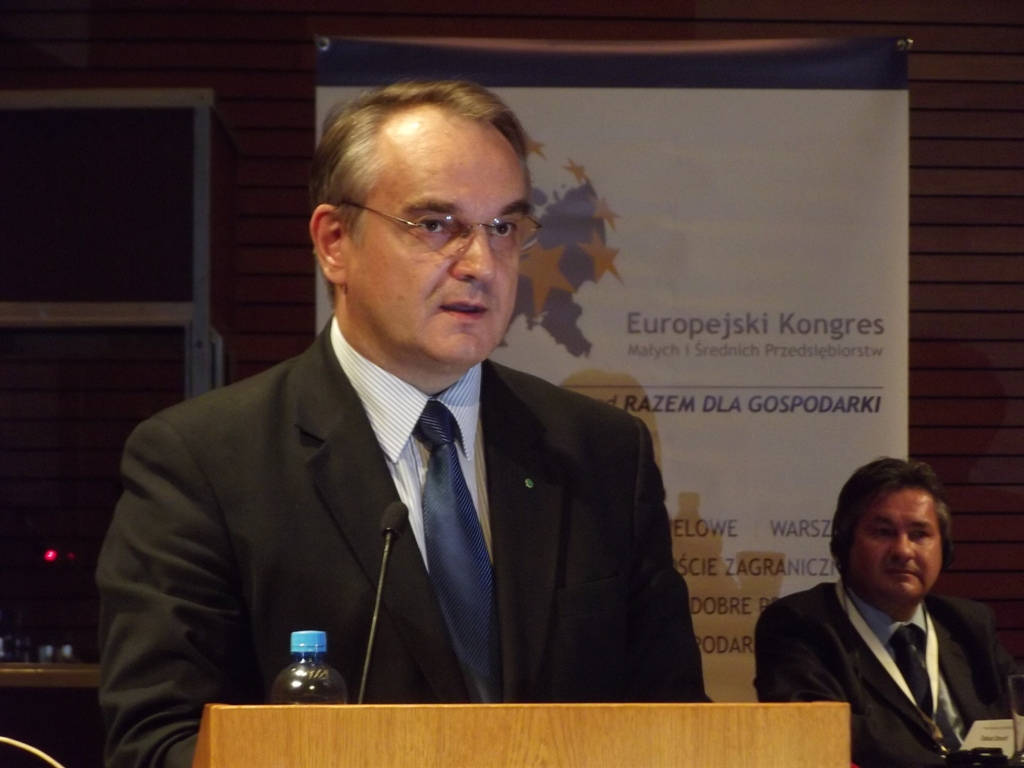
Candidate	Janusz Piechociński	Waldemar Pawlak
Popular vote	547	530
Percentage	50.79%	49.21%
Chairman before election
Waldemar Pawlak
Elected Chairman
Janusz Piechociński

The 2012 Polish People's Party leadership election was held on 17 November 2012 at the 11th Polish People's Party Congress in Pruszków. Janusz Piechociński was elected as the party chairman, narrowly defeating incumbent Waldemar Pawlak by a margin of 17 votes.

== Election ==
The election was held on 17 November 2012 at the 11th Polish People's Party Congress in Pruszków. Incumbent chairman Waldemar Pawlak was defeated by challenger Janusz Piechociński, with Piechociński receiving the votes of 51% of delegates. In the election for Head of the Supreme Council, incumbent Jarosław Kalinowski maintained his position by a margin of 3 votes, defeating Adam Jarubas, who received the endorsement of Piechociński.

== Results ==
=== Party chairman ===
Candidate	Vote	%
Janusz Piechociński ✓	547	50.79
Waldemar Pawlak	530	49.21
Total votes	1077	100.00
Source: Forbes

=== Head of the Supreme Council ===
Candidate	Vote	%
Jarosław Kalinowski ✓	486	50.15
Adam Jarubas	483	49.85
Total votes	969	100.00
Source: Polskie Radio Program I
