= Polish People's Party =

Political party in Poland

Polish People's Party Polskie Stronnictwo Ludowe
- Leader: Władysław Kosiniak-Kamysz
- Founded: 5 May 1990; 36 years ago
- Preceded by: United People's Party
- Headquarters: ul. Kopernika 36/40, 00-924 Warsaw
- Membership (2025): ~73,000
- Ideology: Conservatism; Christian democracy; Social conservatism; Pro-Europeanism; Economic liberalism Historical: Agrarianism Agrarian socialism
- Political position: Centre-right to right-wing Historical: Left-wing
- National affiliation: Polish Coalition; Senate Pact 2023 (for 2023 Senate election); Third Way (formerly) (Note: From 27 April 2023 to 17 June 2025)
- European affiliation: European People's Party
- European Parliament group: European People's Party Group
- Colours: Aquamarine (Note: since 2019); Green (Note: before 2019)
- Anthem: "Rota"
- Sejm: 28 / 460
- Senate: 4 / 100
- European Parliament: 2 / 53
- Regional assemblies: 58 / 552
- City presidents: 1 / 107
- Voivodes: 2 / 16
- Voivodeship Marshals: 2 / 16

Website
- psl.pl

The Polish People's Party (Polish: Polskie Stronnictwo Ludowe, PSL) is a conservative political party in Poland. It is currently led by Władysław Kosiniak-Kamysz.

Its history traces back to 1895, when it held the name People's Party, although its name was changed to the present one in 1903. During the Second Polish Republic, the Polish People's Party was represented by a number of parties that held its name. They were all supportive of agrarian policies, although they spanned from the left-wing to the centre-right on the political spectrum. It was reformed to the People's Party shortly after the Sanacja regime took power. It took part in the formation of the Polish government-in-exile during the World War II, and after the war it was again reformed into the Polish People's Party, and soon after into the United People's Party. During the existence of the Polish People's Republic, it was seen as a satellite party of the ruling Polish United Workers' Party that promoted rural interests. After the fall of communism, it participated in the governments led by the Democratic Left Alliance. In the mid-2000s, it began shifting more to the centre-right and it adopted more conservative policies. It entered in the government again following the 2007 parliamentary election, between 2015 and 2023, the party remained in opposition. During this period, it abandoned its agrarian roots and evolved toward a more economically liberal and largely non-ideological profile. At the end of 2023, it joined the coalition government together with Civic Platform, Poland 2050 and New Left.

Today, it is classified as right-wing; (Note: besides conservative views,) it is also Christian democratic, socially conservative, economically liberal, and supports Poland's membership in the European Union. It currently has 28 seats in the Sejm and four seats in the Senate. On national level, it heads the Polish Coalition; further, on European level, it is a part of the European People's Party. The party's symbol is the four-leafed clover.

== History ==
=== Before 1945 ===
The party's name traces its tradition to an agrarian party in Austrian-controlled Kingdom of Galicia, which sent MPs to the parliament in Vienna. The party was formed in 1895 in the Polish town of Rzeszów under the name Stronnictwo Ludowe (People's Party). The party changed its name in 1903 to what it's known as now. The party from July 15, 1897, was led by Henryk Rewakowicz and was quite successful, seating representatives in the Galician parliament before the turn of the 19th century. In the Second Polish Republic there were a few parties named PSL (Polish People's Party "Wyzwolenie", Polish People's Party "Piast", Polish People's Party "Left" and others) until they were removed by the Sanacja regime (see also People's Party).

During this time, there were two parties using the term "Polish People's Party", namely Polish People's Party "Piast" and Polish People's Party "Wyzwolenie" (which were merged into People's Party with Stronnictwo Chłopskie). During World War II, PSL took part in forming the Polish government in exile.

=== Under the communist regime ===
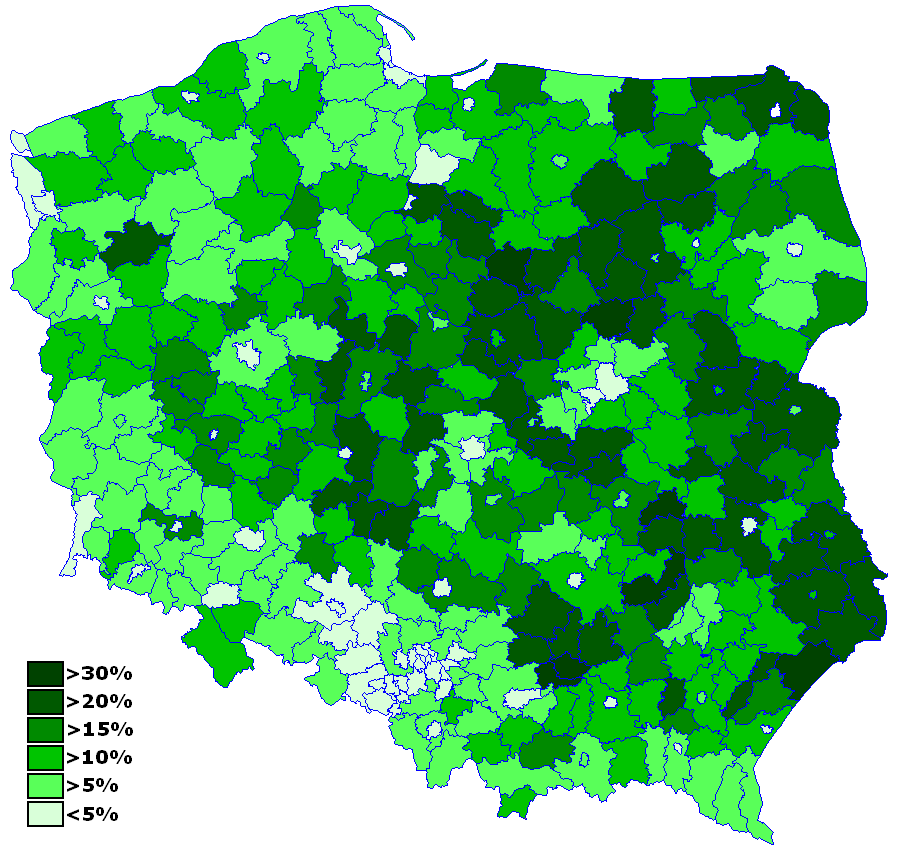
Support for the PSL by region in 2007 Polish parliamentary election

In June 1945 after the war Stanisław Mikołajczyk, a PSL leader who had been Prime Minister of the Polish government in exile, returned to communist-dominated Poland, where he joined the provisional government and rebuilt PSL. The party hoped to win the Yalta Conference-mandated elections and help establish a parliamentary system in Poland. However, the party soon found itself targeted with intimidation, arrests and violence by the communist secret police.

The communists also formed a rival ersatz 'Peasants' party' controlled by them, in order to confuse voters. The January 1947 parliamentary election was heavily rigged, with the communist-controlled bloc claiming to have won 80% of the vote. The PSL were said to have won just 10% of the vote, but many neutral observers believe the PSL would have won the election had it been conducted fairly.

Mikołajczyk was soon compelled to flee Poland for his life in October 1947. The communists then forced the remains of Mikołajczyk's PSL to unite with the pro-communist People's Party to form the United People's Party. The ZSL was a governing partner in the ruling coalition.

=== Post-communist period (1990–2003) ===
Around the time of the fall of communism, several PSLs were recreated, including Peasants' Agreement, Polskie Stronnictwo Ludowe-Odrodzenie, and Polskie Stronnictwo Ludowe (Wilanów faction). In 1989, most merged into one party and took part in forming the first postwar noncommunist government in Poland with the Solidarity grouping; in 1990, the party changed its name to PSL.

It remained on the left of Polish politics in the 1990s, entering into coalitions with the postcommunist Democratic Left Alliance. In the 2001 parliamentary elections, PSL received 9% of votes and formed a coalition with the Democratic Left Alliance, an alliance which later broke down. Since then, PSL has moved towards more centrist and conservative policies.

=== Opposition years (2003–2007) ===
The party ran in the 2004 European Parliament election as part of the European People's Party (EPP) and received 6% of the vote, giving it four of 54 Polish seats in the European Parliament. In the 2005 general election, the party received 7% of votes, giving it 25 seats in the Sejm and two in the Senate. In the 2007 parliamentary elections, the party placed fourth, with 8.93% of the vote and 31 out of 460 seats, and entered into a governing coalition with the victor, the centre-right Civic Platform. In European parliament elections PSL received 7.01% of votes in 2009. In the 2011 national parliamentary election, Polish People's Party received 8.36% votes which gave them 28 seats in the Sejm and two mandates in the Senate.

=== Coalition government (2007–2015) ===
After the parliamentary elections in 2007, PSL won 8.91% of the popular vote and 31 seats, it joined the government coalition led by Civic Platform. Waldemar Pawlak was appointed deputy prime minister, Marek Sawicki was appointed as agriculture minister, and Jolanta Fedak was appointed as labor minister. In the 2009 European Parliament election, it won 3 seats. After the Smolensk air disaster, presidential elections were held in which Pawlak placed fifth, winning 1.75% of the vote. In the second round they didn't state their support for anyone.

In the 2010 local government elections, PSL obtained 16.3% of the votes in the elections to voivodship assemblies, in which it received 93 seats. In the Świętokrzyskie sejmik, the party received the most seats. In all parliamentary assemblies, PSL found itself in ruling coalitions with the PO, in four voivodeships receiving the positions of marshals. In the elections to poviat councils, the PSL committee obtained 15.88%, and in the elections to municipal councils 11% of the votes. The PSL won the largest number of village leaders (428) and mayors in the country, and in Zgierz, the party's candidate won the presidential election. In 2011, a PiS senator defected to PSL.

In the parliamentary elections of 2011, PSL obtained 8.36% of votes on the list of candidates for the Sejm. The party also won two seats in the Senate. Eugeniusz Grzeszczak became the deputy speaker of the Sejm on behalf of the PSL. PSL again became a partner of the PO in the government coalition. On December 7, 2011, as a result of the entry into force of the Lisbon Treaty, Arkadiusz Bratkowski, a PSL politician, assumed a mandate in the European Parliament.

In July 2012, Stanisław Kalemba replaced Marek Sawicki as the minister of agriculture and rural development. Pawlak was defeated during the presidential election by Janusz Piechociński. Two days later, Waldemar Pawlak announced his resignation as deputy prime minister and minister of economy. He was dismissed from both functions on November 27. On December 6, both these offices were taken over by Janusz Piechociński.

In January 2014, PSL decided to establish cooperation with SKL and Samoobrona, but SKL already in February announced that Jarosław Gowin joined Poland Together, and the PSL talks about a joint election campaign with Samoobrona did not end with an agreement. In March, MP Andrzej Dąbrowski left PSL. The party's candidate in the 2015 presidential election was the marshal of the Świętokrzyskie Province, party vice president Adam Jarubas. He placed 6th, obtaining 238,761 votes. Before the second round, PSL was involved in the campaign of the then-incumbent President Bronisław Komorowski.

=== In opposition (2015–2023) ===
At the 2015 parliamentary election, the PSL dropped to 5.13% of the vote, just barely over the 5% threshold. With 16 seats, it was the smallest of the five factions in the Sejm.

Since then, PSL has lost even more support to PiS during the 2018 Polish local elections when they lost 87 seats and dropped to 12.07% unlike the 23.9% they got at the last local elections. After this, the party became a junior partner in coalition with the Civic Coalition and SLD.

In the 2019 European election, PSL won three seats as a part of the European Coalition.

For the parliamentary elections in the same year, PSL decided to create a centrist and Christian-democratic coalition called the Polish Coalition. The Polish Coalition, apart from PSL, consisted of Kukiz'15, Union of European Democrats and other liberal, catholic and regionalist organisations. The coalition managed to get 30 Sejm members elected, 20 of whom were members of PSL.

In November 2020, PSL decided to end coalition with Kukiz'15 due to differences on negotiations on EU budget.

Before the 2023 parliamentary elections Polish Coalition formed a broader alliance with centrist Poland 2050 of Szymon Hołownia.

=== Coalition government (2023–present) ===
After the parliamentary elections in 2023, Third Way block won 14.4% of the popular vote and 65 seats, it joined the government coalition with Civic Coalition and The Left. Władysław Kosiniak-Kamysz was appointed as the deputy prime minister and as a Minister of National Defense, Czesław Siekierski was appointed as Minister of Agriculture and Rural Development, Dariusz Klimczak was appointed as Minister of Infrastructure and Krzysztof Hetman as Minister of Development and Technology. Because of the electoral success (65 MPs) Third Way block has also participated in 2024 local getting 12.07% of the votes in the elections to voivodship assemblies, in which it received 80 seats. The Third Way maintained their alliance for the European parliamentary elections of 2024, and won three seats with 6.9% of the vote, a sharp decline from the national elections in 2023.

On 17 June 2025, the Executive Council of the Polish People's Party announced that it had decided to leave Third Way and run separately in the next parliamentary election. Poland 2050 stated that it accepts the decision of its partner and confirmed that it marks the end of the alliance. Political commentators noted that the decision was likely caused by poor performance in the polls - In June 2025, the Third Way was polling around 4%, way short of the 8% electoral threshold for coalitions running for the Sejm. Later, Kosiniak-Kamysz elaborated that the PSL would seek to contest the next parties alone, and not as part of any electoral bloc.

On 23 July 2025 in Tusk's cabinet reshuffle, Władysław Kosiniak-Kamysz remained as Minister of National Defense, and Dariusz Klimczak continued as Minister of Infrastructure. However, Czesław Siekierski was replaced by Stefan Krajewski as Minister of Agriculture and Rural Development, and Miłosz Motyka was appointed as the new Minister of Energy.

== Ideology ==
The Polish People's Party adhered to the principles of agrarian socialism and anti-neoliberalism in the 1990s and early 2000s, and had a post-communist character, highlighting the positive sides of the former communist system and rejecting the Polish transformation to capitalism because of its high social cost and inequality. It was positioned on the left-wing on the political spectrum during that period. As late as 2011, the party was still described as "a left-wing party, representing an agrarian socialist agenda, although it is also known for its social conservatism". Up to 2008, the party also opposed liberalism, denouncing it as "primitive social Darwinism" and warning against a liberal state where "people are subordinated to the market". After 2008, the Polish People's Party started drifting towards centrism, abandoning its criticism of economic liberalism as well as discarding its agrarian socialist vision for the Polish economy. It embraced an ideology of "neoagrarianism" that postulated a third way economic system based on Catholic social teaching, which rejected the downsides of both capitalism and communism. The party then switched to Christian democracy and supported a regulated free market - the social market economy. PSL has drifted once more in the late 2010s and early 2020s towards the political right, adopting a neoliberal economic program based on deregulation and privatization. The party retained its Christian democratic character on social issues, where it continues to adhere to social conservatism.

=== Ideology from 1990s to 2000s ===
The party, as it was reformed in 1990, was a direct and formal successor of the socialist United People's Party, and it inherited the party's members, political foundations as well as funds. The PSL was one of the two major Polish parties between from the 1990s to late 2000s with communist origins along with the Democratic Left Alliance; these two parties, along with Self-Defence of the Republic of Poland, formed the post-communist bloc. Thus the party had a left-wing economic program that promoted agrarian socialism and praised the fallen communist regime, appealing to the communist nostalgia of voters. The party made references to the peasant movement of the Second Polish Republic and the WW2-era PSL led by Stanisław Mikołajczyk, but these remained at a figurative level and did not affect the party's socialist alignment. This led to a split in the party; after the anti-communist Roman Bartoszcze was ousted as the party leader and PSL made its communist legacy more explicit, disaffected agrarians who returned to Poland from exile left the party and formed Peasants' Agreement.

In that period, the PSL condemned globalization and capitalist reforms as the driving factors behind the loss of national sovereignty and the growing inequality in the countryside. The party spoke against privatization and instead envisioned a decentralized socialist structure based on state-owned, communal as well as "social" (cooperative) ownership of the Polish economy. The party listed rural poverty, unemployment, lack of affordable housing and limited healthcare access as consequences of the economic liberalization pursued in the 1990s. The party also argued that the 'national interests' necessitates state ownership of most industries, especially that of the banks; the party also proposed a catalogue of protectionist measures that would stop the decline of the Polish agriculture and food industry.

In his 2001 analysis of the party, political scientist Aleks Szczerbiak wrote that the party combined "left-wing socio-economic policies and (broadly) right-wing approach to moral-cultural issues such as the role of the church and religion in public life". Szczerbiak noted that while it was speculated that PSL would abandon its socialist roots and turn towards the centre-right in order to align itself closer to the pre-WW2 Polish People's Party, this did not occur as of early 2000s. He stated that the party's economic program "was considerably more left-wing than that of any West European Christian democratic party", and that despite its social conservatism, the PSL was "reluctant to adopt an overtly proclerical stance and identify so unambiguously with the church hierarchy". At that time, the party mainly focused on appealing to socioeconomically left-wing segment of the electorate, and ran on a populist and anti-neoliberal appeal, denouncing the "neo-liberal vision of the party based mainly on a narrow circle of professional politicians and a bureaucratic apparatus, whose main tacks is obtaining power and narrow social groups" in Polish politics.

The PSL pointed to liberalism and authoritarian tendencies as its main ideological opponents. The party program from that time argued that "in the name of blind liberalism—the doctrine of the elimination of the state from any influence on the shaping of economic structures, it passively watches as more and more segments of our market are taken over by foreign entities and as domestic companies are eliminated from it, for which, in addition, worse economic conditions are created for economic activity". Liberalism was described an ideology in which the state passively observes the struggle on the market between foreign, powerful concerns and Polish enterprises, which, being weaker and deprived of state support, fail. The party argued that the consequence of this was a high rate of unemployment, giving rise to social problems. The party also noted the existence of social disparities and the lack of prospects for the young generation, which is forced to emigrate in search of work, which caused a weakening of Poland's international role, subject to the uncontrolled game played by global corporations.

=== Drift to the right ===
Until the early 2000s, the party appealed to defined socio-economic constituencies, especially the rural-agrarian electorate. However, it tried to broaden its appeal to the poor and the so-called "transition losers", namely social groups that became impoverished as a result of the capitalist transformation. This led the PSL to position itself "as an aggressively anti-liberal and pro-state intervention part". Szczerbiak argues that in 2003, the party represented the "left-wing, anti-liberal pole". To this end, the party shifted its message, gradually abandoning the focus on agrarian issues in order to campaign on broad policies such as slowing down privatisation, restricting foreign capital in the Polish economy, and protecting the poor from budget cuts. It was in the 2000s that the party would abandon rural aesthetics such as village bands, costumes, and disco polo music, replacing it with tailored suits and presenting itself as a modern party. The party went as far as claiming that it is no longer aimed at primarily farmers, stating it its 2001 program that "the PSL is a centre-left party for everyone—farmers, hired employees, businessmen, craftsmen, shopkeepers, the intelligentsia, students, retirees and pensioners, residents of rural areas, small towns as well as cities".

However, the party was eclipsed by the radical Self-Defence of the Republic of Poland, a far-left populist party that adopted the most left-wing and national protectionist stance on socio-economic issues out of all Polish parties. Campaigning on redistribution of wealth, state-guaranteed social minimum, maximum wage for the rich, imposing tariffs and calling for radical measures such as reversing privatization through nationalization and forced removal of foreign capital from Polish economy, Samoobrona gained recognition as the party of the poor, unemployed, farmers and "transition losers" in general. Samoobrona also undercut PSL's post-communist appeal by referring to communist Poland with nostalgia and targeting former State Agricultural Farms workers who lost their livehood as a result of privatization. Samoobrona was able to successfully win out the poor voters in both 2001 and 2005 parliamentary elections. Meanwhile, PSL's pivot failed to produce a breakthrough, as while it made minor inroads into almost every voting group, it was only barely enough to compensate party's losses amongst its hitherto core constituency, namely the farmers. This led the Polish People's Party to pivot rightwards.

The origin of the party's pivot was in the late 2000s, as the party's anti-liberal slogan was overshadowed by the one of right-wing populist Law and Justice, while agrarian socialism became the staple of the far-left Self-Defence of the Republic of Poland, which would form an anti-liberal government together with Law and Justice and League of Polish Families in 2005. PSL started cooperating with the Civic Platform at this time, a party based on liberal and conservative ideas; this forced PSL to tone down its rhetoric as to avoid attacking the anticipated future coalition partner. Political analysis of the party's rhetoric in 2006 found that the party would increasingly embrace liberalism in place of its hitherto economically left-wing program, which placed the party closer to the Civic Platform and other centre-right parties. This was in stark contrast to a fellow agrarian party Self-Defence of the Republic of Poland, which espoused conservatively socialist views.

From the late 2000s onwards, the party pivoted away from its once agrarian socialist program in favor of "neoagrarianism", which it defined as the "principle of class solidarity and peasant separatism postulating the necessity of an evolutionary path of social reconstruction on the principles of economic democracy, with particular attention to the interests of agriculture and under the political leadership of the peasant layer." Neoagrarianism of the party also included the concept of a "third way" of social development aiming at the creation of a state system between capitalism and communism. This new form of economic system was to be based on Catholic social teaching and eliminate both "the shortcomings of capitalism and the dangers posed by communism". The neoagrarian economy was also to be based on the principle of Catholic subsidiarity, " the primacy of labour over capital", as well as rejection of monetarism and neoliberalism. The party then gradually abandoned its criticism of liberalism, eventually embracing it as a result.

In the context of the 2005 election, the party was described as centre-left. In 2006, the Polish People's Party was described as "echoing the socialist rhetoric of its past", being left-wing on economic matters while leaning conservative on social issues. In 2007, the party was still referred to as left-leaning. By 2010, the party was described as centrist instead, with a note that in the previous years the party's program "was rather left–wing with a focus on agricultural issues". Analyzing the party's 2000s ideology, Beata Kosowska-Gąstoł argues that PSL combined right-wing worldview with left-wing economic postulates. In 2015, the party was described as centre-right. By 2020, it was referred to as right-wing. In 2024, PSL came to be considered "the most right-wing in its history since the May Coup" (from 1926). In the same year, it was also reported that PSL is turning further to the right, and that it is increasingly accentuating its right-wing identity.

It was also noted that the party started moving away from its agrarian tradition. In 2008, Piotr Borowiec wrote:

The most significant change during this period – although the process had begun before 2005 – was the way politics was conducted by the PSL, the smallest party in parliament between 2005 and 2007. This change mainly consisted of opening up to the world and revising its attitude towards the European Union and, consequently, towards basic economic mechanisms, the market, monetarism and innovation. As a result of these transformations and its political style, which can be described as ‘centrist moderation’, as well as its substantive programme discourse, the party gained many supporters among educated, urban and better-off people. It is therefore no longer a rural party, let alone a ‘peasant’ party.

Polish political scientist Aleksandra Bilewicz wrote that after the 2023 Polish parliamentary election, the party has completely abandoned agrarianism:

There is no reference to agrarianism in the party’s current programme. The current pre-election agreement between the PSL and Polska 2050, called the Third Way (which may be a reference to the peasant tradition), barely mentions its views on agrarian issues, although the coalition's pre-election programme does propose measures to protect small and medium-sized companies. It can therefore be concluded that the PSL today is not continuing the agrarian tradition and that these traditions are not alive within the party. The PSL has earned itself a reputation as a rather ideologically vacuous party.

=== Modern program ===
On social and ethical issues, PSL is attached to more social conservative values, as it opposes abortion (although it is against its criminalization, defending the current abortion law in Poland), legalisation of same-sex marriage, euthanasia, death penalty, and soft drug decriminalisation. It also opposes civil partnerships - both same-sex and different-sex ones. The party is in favour of maintaining religion lessons in public education. In 2019, the party adopted (as part of an agreement with Kukiz'15) in the party's platform direct democracy's postulates, including introducing single-member districts, electronic voting and obligatory referendums. The party rejected The Left's "Pact for Women" proposal which called for liberalization of abortion law. Apart from abortion, the party is conservative on gender issues, seeing women as mothers and upholding the model of traditional family.

Despite its formerly socialist alignment, the party embraced economic liberalism ever since it entered a coalition with the Civic Platform. The PSL supported economic policies such as increasing the retirement age, privatization of state-owned enterprises, as well as implementing deregulation in order to secure funds from the European Union. Nowadays, the party is considered economically liberal and oriented towards the free market, aligning with the parties such as Civic Platform, Poland 2050 and Modern. As part of the Third Way, PSL adopted a neoliberal-conservative program, promoting low taxes, market solutions to the housing crisis and climate change, as well as increased role of the private sector in Polish economy and public services.

Moreover, during the leadership of Władysław Kosiniak-Kamysz, who took over after 2015 elections, PSL has visibly started leaning towards economic liberalism in order to gain voters in bigger cities. Kosiniak-Kamysz himself has described party's ideology as "moderately centrist" and Christian democratic. After most of the party's MPs voted against a law softening abortion law in Poland in 2024, PSL began to visibly present itself as the conservative wing of a ruling coalition under the premiership of Donald Tusk, which caused criticism from left-wing politicians and activists, such as Marta Lempart. Polish political scientist Rafał Chwedoruk noted that by 2024, the party has become the most right-wing in its party history, even more than it was when it entered a government with right-wing nationalists in the 1920s. Similarly, Zuzanna Dąbrowska argues that the PSL has become increasingly supportive of cooperation with other right-wing parties.

Under the leadership of Kosiniak-Kamysz, the Polish People's Party abandoned its historical tradition of agrarianism; Kosiniak-Kamysz stressed that the Polish People's Party should be 'universal' rather than agrarian, and oversaw shifts in the party's program towards economic liberalism and positions that are attractive to urban voters. The party's historically left-wing stances were appropriated by a minor party AGROunia instead. After the creation of the Third Way together with Poland 2050, political scientists noted that the Polish People's Party no longer refers to agrarianism in its program, its economic postulates are pro-business and oriented towards small and middle-sized companies, and the party has abandoned the agrarian tradition in favor of a non-ideological, big tent appeal. In 2025, Kosiniak-Kamysz remarked that PSL "ceased to be an agrarian party a long time ago".

== Election results ==
=== Support ===
The Party's traditional support base consisted of farmers, peasants and rural voters. Voters are generally more social conservative than voters of Civic Platform. Its main competitor in rural areas is the national conservative Law and Justice (PiS).

In the 2010s, the party started to lose support between rural voters (especially in southeast of Poland, e.g. Subcarpathian Voivodeship). In 2019 election PSL gained surprisingly significant support in cities and won mandates (e. g. in Warsaw and Wrocław).

=== Presidential ===
Election year	Candidate	1st round		2nd round	
Election year	Candidate	# of overall votes	% of overall vote	# of overall votes	% of overall vote
1990	Roman Bartoszcze	1,176,175	7.15 (#5)		
1995	Waldemar Pawlak	770,419	4.31 (#5)		
2000	Jarosław Kalinowski	1,047,949	5.95 (#4)		
2005	Jarosław Kalinowski	269,316	1.80 (#5)		
2010	Waldemar Pawlak	294,273	1.75 (#5)	No endorsement	
2015	Adam Jarubas	238,761	1.60 (#6)		
2020	Władysław Kosiniak-Kamysz	459,365	2.36 (#5)		
2025	Supported Szymon Hołownia	978,901	4.99 (#5)	Endorsed Rafał Trzaskowski	

=== Sejm ===
Election	Leader	Votes	%	Seats	+/–	Government
1991	Waldemar Pawlak	972,952	8.7 (#5)	48 / 460	New	PC–ZChN–PSL-PL–SLCh minority (1991–1992)
1991	Waldemar Pawlak	972,952	8.7 (#5)	48 / 460	New	UD–ZChN–PChD–KLD–PSL-PL–SLCh–PPPP (1992–1993)
1993	Waldemar Pawlak	2,124,367	15.4 (#2)	132 / 460	▲84	SLD–PSL
1997	Waldemar Pawlak	956,184	7.3 (#4)	27 / 460	▼105	AWS–UW (1997–2000)
1997	Waldemar Pawlak	956,184	7.3 (#4)	27 / 460	▼105	AWS Minority (2000–2001)
2001	Jarosław Kalinowski	1,168,659	9.0 (#5)	42 / 460	▲15	SLD–UP–PSL (2001–2003)
2001	Jarosław Kalinowski	1,168,659	9.0 (#5)	42 / 460	▲15	SLD–UP Minority (2003–2004)
2001	Jarosław Kalinowski	1,168,659	9.0 (#5)	42 / 460	▲15	SLD-UP-SDPL Minority (2004–2005)
2005	Waldemar Pawlak	821,656	7.0 (#6)	25 / 460	▼17	PiS minority (2005–2006); PSL confidence and supply
2005	Waldemar Pawlak	821,656	7.0 (#6)	25 / 460	▼17	PiS–SRP–LPR (2006–2007)
2005	Waldemar Pawlak	821,656	7.0 (#6)	25 / 460	▼17	PiS Minority (2007)
2007	Waldemar Pawlak	1,437,638	8.9 (#4)	31 / 460	▲6	PO–PSL
2011	Waldemar Pawlak	1,201,628	8.4 (#4)	28 / 460	▼3	PO–PSL
2015	Janusz Piechociński	779,875	5.1 (#6)	16 / 460	▼12	PiS
2019	Władysław Kosiniak-Kamysz	972,339	5.3 (#4)	19 / 460	▲3	PiS
2019	Władysław Kosiniak-Kamysz	As part of the Polish Coalition, that won 30 seats in total				
2023	Władysław Kosiniak-Kamysz	1,189,629	5.5 (#3)	28 / 460	▲9	PiS Minority (2023)
2023	Władysław Kosiniak-Kamysz	1,189,629	5.5 (#3)	28 / 460	▲9	KO–PL2050–KP–NL (2023–2026)
2023	Władysław Kosiniak-Kamysz	1,189,629	5.5 (#3)	28 / 460	▲9	KO–KP–NL–PL2050–C (2026–present)
2023	Władysław Kosiniak-Kamysz	As part of the Third Way coalition, that won 65 seats in total				

=== Senate ===
Election	Seats	+/–
1991	7 / 100	New
1993	36 / 100	▲29
1997	3 / 100	▼33
2001	4 / 100	▲1
2005	2 / 100	▼2
2007	0 / 100	▼2
2011	2 / 100	▲2
2015	1 / 100	▼1
2019	2 / 100	▲1
2023	4 / 100	▲2

=== European Parliament ===
Election	Leader	Votes	%	Seats	+/–	EP Group
2004	Janusz Wojciechowski	386,340	6.34 (#7)	4 / 54	New	EPP-ED
2009	Waldemar Pawlak	516,146	7.01 (#4)	3 / 50	▼1	EPP
2014	Janusz Piechociński	480,846	7.18 (#5)	4 / 51	▲1	EPP
2019	Władysław Kosiniak-Kamysz	617,772	4.53 (#4)	3 / 52	▼1	EPP
2019	Władysław Kosiniak-Kamysz	As part of the European Coalition, that won 22 seats in total				
2024	Władysław Kosiniak-Kamysz	813,238	6.91 (#4)	2 / 53	▼1	EPP
2024	Władysław Kosiniak-Kamysz	As part of the Third Way coalition, that won 3 seats in total				

=== Regional assemblies ===
Election	%	Seats	+/–
1990	4.3 (#4)	160 / 2,468	▲160
1994	18.0 (#2)	444 / 2,468	▲284
1998	12.0 (#3)	89 / 855	▼355
1998	As part of the Social Alliance		
2002	10.8 (#5)	58 / 561	▼31
2006	13.2 (#4)	83 / 561	▲25
2010	16.3 (#3)	93 / 561	▲10
2014	23.9 (#3)	157 / 555	▲64
2018	12.1 (#3)	70 / 552	▼87
2024	14.25 (#3)	58 / 552	▼29
2024	As part of the Third Way		

== Leadership ==
No.	Image	Chairman	Tenure
1		Roman Bartoszcze	5 May 1990 – 29 June 1991
2		Waldemar Pawlak	29 June 1991 – 11 November 1997
3		Jarosław Kalinowski	11 November 1997 – 16 March 2004
4		Janusz Wojciechowski	16 March 2004 – 29 January 2005
5		Waldemar Pawlak	29 January 2005 – 17 November 2012
6		Janusz Piechociński	17 November 2012 – 7 November 2015
7		Władysław Kosiniak-Kamysz	7 November 2015 – Incumbent

=== Voivodeship Marshals ===
Name	Image	Voivodeship	Date Vocation
Adam Struzik		Masovian Voivodeship	10 December 2001
Paweł Gancarz		Lower Silesian Voivodeship	21 Maja 2024

== See also ==
- List of Polish People's Party politicians
