= Lucjan Malinowski =

Polish linguist (1839–1898)

Lucjan Feliks Malinowski
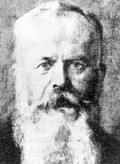
- Lucjan Malinowski
- Born: 27 May 1839; Jaroszewice, Congress Poland, Russian Empire
- Died: 15 January 1898 (aged 58); Kraków, Austrian Poland
- Education: Jagiellonian University
- Scientific career
- Fields: Linguistics

Lucjan Feliks Malinowski (Polish: [maliˈnɔfskʲi]; 27 May 1839 – 15 January 1898) was a Polish linguist, a researcher of regional dialects of Silesia, a traveller, a professor of Jagiellonian University, from the 1887 principal Seminar Slavic languages. Malinowski studied the history of the Polish language and etymology. He was the father of anthropologist Bronisław Malinowski.

He is recognized as the father of Polish dialectology.

== Biography ==
Born in 1839 in a territorial family in Jaroszewice. He was the son of Julian Malinowski (Pobóg coat of arms) and Ewa née Górski (granddaughter of Marcin Koźmian, who was the uncle of Kajetan Koźman, a literary critic and poet). His family lost its estate due to repression by partitioning powers, but also due to their own irresponsibility. He had to earn a living by education. He finished grammar-school with highest estimations from all objects. In 1861 he started Preparatory Courses in Warsaw, and the following year he joined the Warsaw University and in 1867 he graduated from the Faculty of History and Philology, receiving a master's degree in philological and historical sciences based on a historical dissertation: "On the conversion of Pomeranian Slavs by St. Otto ". After receiving the scholarship, he supplemented his studies in Berlin, Jena, St. Petersburg, Moscow and Leipzig, dealing with dialectology and conducting linguistic research in Silesia and Spis. In 1873 he published the first study of Polish regional dialects. In 1876 he obtained the title of associate professor, and in 1877 he became the Chair of Slavonic Philology at the Jagiellonian University. On 30 June 1877 he became a member of the Academy of Learning. In 1883 he obtained the title of full professor. On 4 April 1884 his only son Bronisław Malinowski was born. Lucjan Malinowski died on 15 January 1898 in Krakow of a heart attack. He was buried at the Rakowicki Cemetery in headquarters VIII.

== Publications ==
- Zarysy życia ludowego na Śląsku (1877)
- Powieści ludu polskiego na Śląsku (1900-1901)
- Powieści ludu na Śląsku Wydawnictwo Literackie, Kraków 1953.
- Bajki śląskie (1884)
- Przyczynek do dziejów polsko-czeskich kontaktów naukowo kulturalnych w drugiej połowie XIX wieku
- Projekt Słownika staropolskiego
- Sprawozdania Komisji Językowej Akademii Umiejętności
- Ueber die Oppelnsche Mundart in Oberschlesien, Bär & Hermann, Leipzig 1873
- Ueber die Endung des Genitiv sing. masc. - neutr. der Pronominalen und zusammengesetzten Declination im Russischen und Kaschubischen, 1874
- Listy z podrózy etnograficznej po Śląsku
- Powieści spiskie
