= Jolanta Fedak =

Polish politician (1960–2020)

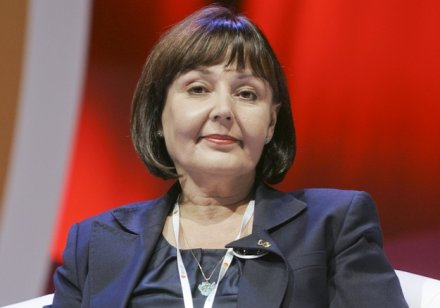
- Fedak in 2011

Minister of Labour and Social Policy
- In office 16 November 2007 – 18 November 2011
- Prime Minister: Donald Tusk
- Preceded by: Joanna Kluzik-Rostkowska
- Succeeded by: Władysław Kosiniak-Kamysz

Member of Sejm
- In office 12 November 2019 – 31 December 2020
- Prime Minister: Mateusz Morawiecki

Personal details
- Born: Jolanta Beata Fedak; 21 September 1960 Żary, Poland
- Died: 31 December 2020 (aged 60)
- Party: Polish People’s Party
- Children: 1
- Education: University of Wrocław
- Occupation: Politician

Jolanta Beata Fedak (21 September 1960 – 31 December 2020) was a Polish politician who served as Minister of Labour and Social Policy from 2007 to 2011.

== Early life and education ==
Born in Żary, Fedak graduated with a degree in political science from the University of Wrocław in 1984. She later completed postgraduate studies in administration at the University of Adam Mickiewicz in Poznań in 1999, and in education management at the University of Szczecin in 2003.

== Career ==
Fedak joined the Polish Peasants' Party (PSL) in the 1990s, and led the party's office in Zielona Góra. She later became Deputy Marshal of the western province of Lubusz Voivodeship with a focus on social issues, and became one of the four vice-chairs of the party's executive committee.

Fedak first ran for the Sejm in 2001, then ran for the Senate in 2005; both attempts were unsuccessful. She also ran for mayor of Zielona Góra in 2006 and the Polish Senate in 2007. In the latter race, she finished ninth out of 12 candidates with 45,719 votes. Despite losing the election, she was appointed Minister of Labour and Social Policy under Donald Tusk as a result of a coalition between the PSL and Tusk's Civic Platform; she served in that position until 2011.

After her term as Labour Minister ended, Fedak was an advisor to Deputy Prime Minister Waldemar Pawlak until his term ended in 2012. Shortly afterwards, Fedak was appointed as a councilor of Zakład Ubezpieczeń Społecznych. In 2014, she ran for a seat in the European parliament as a member of the PSL. While she finished first in her constituency out of 10 candidates with 6,906 votes, the party did not have enough votes as a whole; they received four seats for 13 constituencies. She was also unsuccessful in a bid for the Sejm during the 2015 parliamentary elections.

From 2015 to 2017 she managed the Provincial Fund for Water Management and Environmental Protection in Zielona Góra.

In the 2019 elections she won a seat in the Sejm and held the position until her death.

== Personal life ==
Fedak was married and had one daughter. She died from cancer on 31 December 2020. Władysław Kosiniak-Kamysz, the president of the PSL party who announced her death stated, "A year ago you won the coveted parliamentary seat, the next win was to be against cancer. You left too early. We will miss you."
