= Czesław Siekierski =

Polish politician

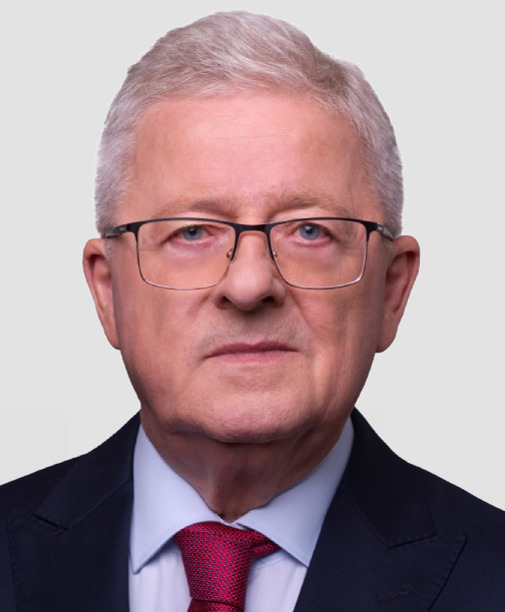
- Siekierski in 2023

Minister of Agriculture and Rural Development
- In office 13 December 2023 – 24 July 2025
- Prime Minister: Donald Tusk
- Preceded by: Anna Gembicka
- Succeeded by: Stefan Krajewski

Member of the Sejm
- Incumbent
- Assumed office 9 August 2019
- In office 20 October 1997 – 19 July 2004

Member of the European Parliament
- In office 20 July 2004 – 1 July 2019
- Constituency: Lesser Poland and Świętokrzyskie

Personal details
- Born: Czesław Adam Siekierski; 8 October 1952 (age 73) Stopnica, Poland
- Party: Polish People's Party

Czesław Adam Siekierski (born 8 October 1952) is a Polish politician who was a Member of the European Parliament (MEP), between 2004 and 2019, for the Lesser Poland Voivodship & Swietokrzyskie Voivodship with the Polish People's Party, part of the European People's Party. On 7 July 2014, Czesław Siekierski was elected Chair of the European Parliament's Committee on Agriculture and Rural Development.

Siekierski is a member of the Conference of Committee Chairs and Delegation for relations with Canada and a substitute for the Committee on Budgetary Control and Delegation for relations with the People's Republic of China.

== Education ==
- 1976: Master's in Engineering
- 1986: Doctor of Economic-Agricultural Studies

== Career ==
- since 1976: Lecturer at the Warsaw Agricultural University
- 1994-1998: Director of the Foundation of Assistance Programmes for Agriculture (FAPA)
- 1971-1977: Chairman of the Council of the University Union of Polish Students
- 1981-1982: Head of the Chief Organising Section of the United Peasants' Party (ZSL)
- 1999-2002: Secretary to the Chief Executive Committee of the Polish Peasants' Party (PSL)
- 1986-1990: Regional councillor on the National Warsaw-Mokotów Council
- 2001-2003: Secretary of State in the Ministry of Agriculture and Rural Development
- 1997-2004: Member of Parliament of the Polish Republic
- 1997-2001: Vice-Chairman of the Economic Committee
- 2003-2004: Observer to the EP
- since 1978: Active member of the Association of Engineers and Agricultural Technicians (since 1977) and of the Polish Economic Society

== Decorations ==
- 1997: Knight's Cross of the Order of Poland Reborn

== See also ==
- 2004 European Parliament election in Poland
