= Roman Bartoszcze =

Polish politician (1946–2015)

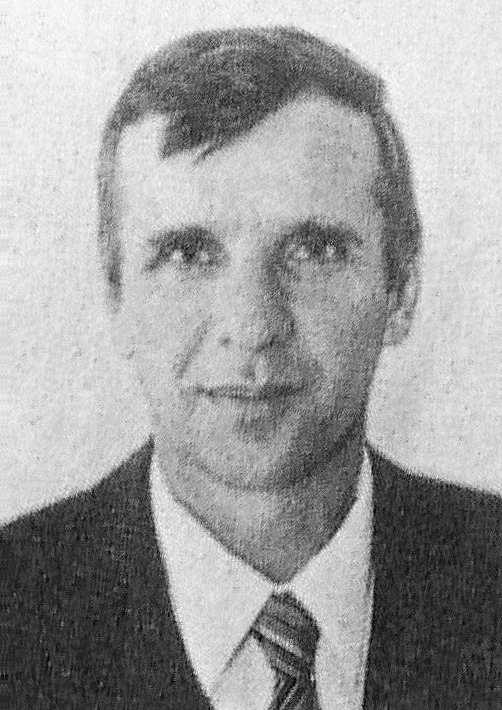
- Born: 9 December 1946; Jaroszewice, Poland
- Died: 31 December 2015 (aged 69); Inowrocław, Poland
- Occupations: Farmer; politician
- Known for: President of the Polish People's Party (1990–91)

Roman Bolesław Bartoszcze (9 December 1946 – 31 December 2015) was a Polish agrarian politician from the Polish People's Party (PSL).

Bartoszcze was born in Jaroszewice, and worked on his family farm there, and later in Sławęcin, until 1966. He did national service from 1966 to 1968.

From 1969 to 1980 he was a member of Polish United Workers' Party satellite United People's Party (ZSL). In 1980 he broke with ZSL and joined oppositional Peaseant Solidarity, which was merged into Solidarity movement in 1981. During Martial law he was arrested and imprisoned for two months as a result of his participation in the Bydgoszcz events. After his release Bartoszcze acted in the All-Poland Peasants Resistance Committee and was an editor of newspaper Żywią i bronią.

Elected in 1989 as Contract Sejm member from the Solidarity Citizens' Committee, he joined the reborn Polish People's Party in 1990 and was soon elected its first leader. The same year he ran for President and lost with 1,176,175 votes (7,15%), winning fifth place among six candidates that fall.

In 1991 he left PSL and founded small conservative Polish Popular-Christian Forum "Patrimony". Re-elected Sejm member in 1991 from Center Civic Alliance he retired from politics with his term ended in 1993.

His brother Piotr, who was also an opposition activist, was murdered by the Security Service.

Party political offices
New political party	President of the Polish People's Party; 1990–1991	Succeeded by Waldemar Pawlak
