= Jaroszewice =

- Village
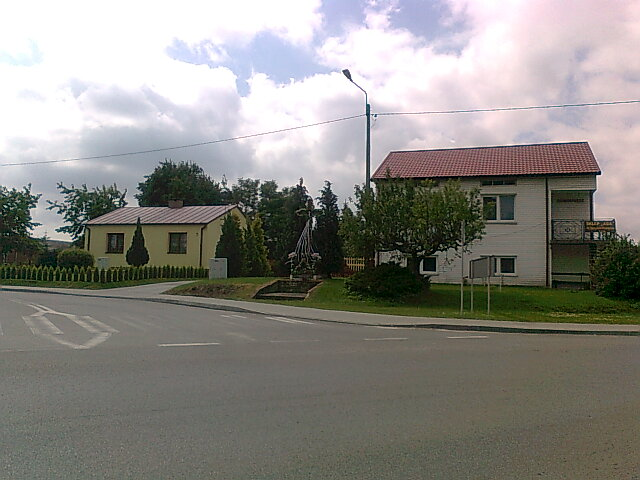

- Location within Poland
- Coordinates: 51°11′N 22°17′E
- Country: Poland
- Voivodeship: Lublin
- County: Lublin
- Gmina: Bełżyce

Population
  - Total: 390
- Time zone: UTC+1 (CET)
  - Summer (DST): UTC+2 (CEST)

Jaroszewice [jarɔʂɛˈvʲit͡sɛ] is a village in the administrative district of Gmina Bełżyce, within Lublin County, Lublin Voivodeship, in eastern Poland.

== History ==
Five Polish citizens were murdered by Nazi Germany in the village during World War II.

== Notable people ==
Roman Bartoszcze, a Polish politician and art collector was born there in 1946.
