= Stefan Krajewski =

Polish politician (born 1981)

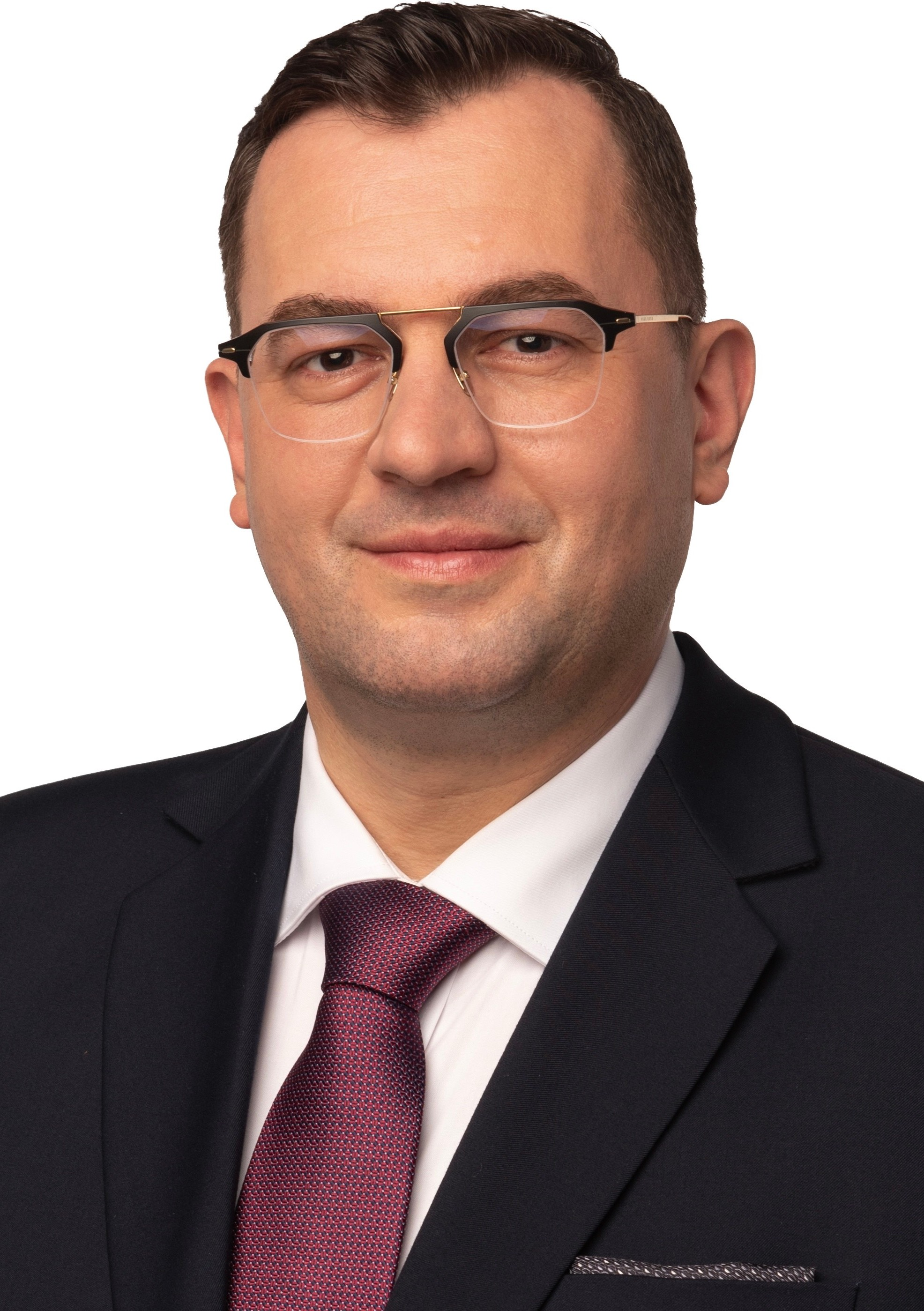

Minister of Agriculture and Rural Development
- Incumbent
- Assumed office 24 July 2025
- Prime Minister: Donald Tusk
- Preceded by: Czesław Siekierski

Member of the Sejm
- Incumbent
- Assumed office 12 November 2019
- Constituency: 24 - Białystok

Personal details
- Born: 8 June 1981 (age 45) Zambrów, Polish People's Republic
- Citizenship: Poland
- Party: Polish People's Party
- Education: University of Warsaw; University of Warmia and Mazury
- Occupation: Politician

Stefan Krajewski (born 8 June 1981 in Zambrów) is a Polish politician, who is currently serving as the Minister of Agriculture and Rural Development and a Member of the Sejm for Białystok since 2019. He was also a member of the board of the Podlaskie Voivodeship of the 5th term (2015–2018).

== Biography ==
He graduated from the 1st Secondary School. Stanisław Konarski in Zambrów. A political scientist by education, he graduated from the Faculty of Journalism and Political Science at the University of Warsaw and postgraduate studies in the field of the European Union's common agricultural policy at the University of Warmia and Mazury in Olsztyn.

He worked at the Agency for Restructuring and Modernization of Agriculture, and from 2004 in the district office in Zambrów, which he managed in 2008–2011. Then, until 2015, he held the position of director of the Podlaskie Regional Branch of Agency for Restructuring and Modernization of Agriculture. He became the chairman of the provincial structures of the Trade Union of the National Center for Young Farmers.

Activist of the Polish People's Party. In the 2010 elections, he was elected as a councilor of the Zambrów County; he then won 284 votes in the district covering the communes of Zambrów and Szumowo. He held this position until 2014, when - receiving 6,241 votes - he became a councilor of the Podlaskie Voivodeship Sejmik. On November 9, 2015, he became a member of the board of the Podlaskie Voivodeship. He held this position until December 11, 2018.

In October 2016, he was elected president of Polish People's Party (PSL) in the Podlaskie Voivodeship. In August 2018, he also headed the district structures of Polish People's Party. In the elections in the same year, he successfully ran for re-election to the regional council (he received 9,892 votes).

In the 2019 parliamentary elections, he won a mandate as a member of the Sejm of the 9th term on behalf of the Polish People's Party, receiving 13,439 votes in the Białystok district. In February 2022, he became secretary of the Supreme Executive Committee of the Polish People's Party.

On July 23, 2025 Prime Minister Donald Tusk announced changes to the cabinet in which he replaced many of the ministers. In this decision he announced that Stefan Krajewski would replace Czesław Siekierski as the Minister of Agriculture and Rural Development. He was formally inaugurated on July 24, 2025 as a member of the Third Cabinet of Donald Tusk.
