= Marek Sawicki =

Polish politician (born 1958)

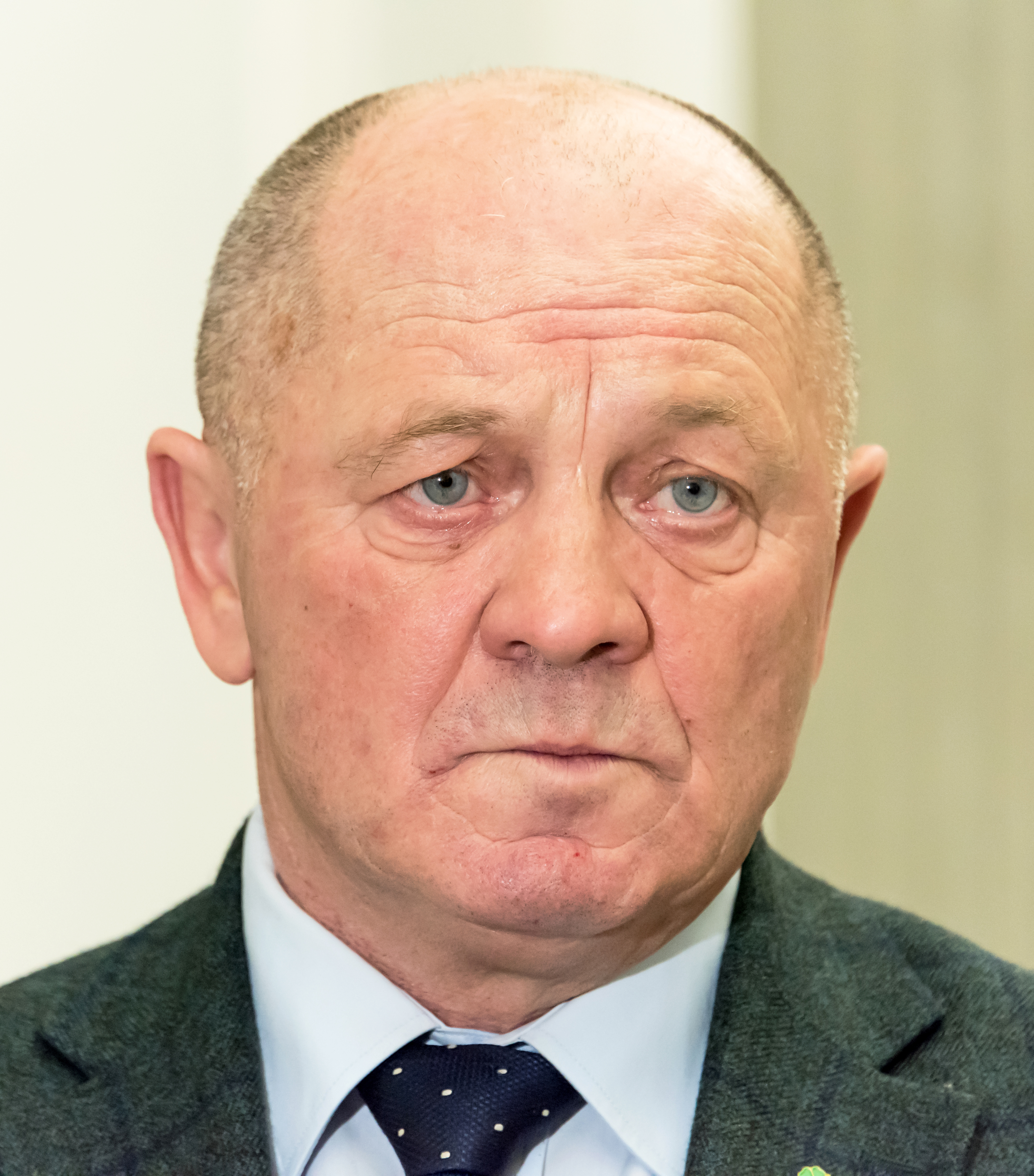

Senior Marshal of the Sejm
- Incumbent
- Assumed office 13 November 2023
- Preceded by: Antoni Macierewicz

Sejm Chair of the Maritime Economy and Inland Navigation Commission
- Incumbent
- Assumed office 13 November 2019
- Deputy: Arkadiusz Marchewka (KO); Jerzy Materna (PiS); Artur Szałabawka (PiS); Jerzy Wilk (PiS)
- Preceded by: Position established

Minister of Agriculture and Rural Development
- In office 17 March 2014 – 16 November 2015
- President: Bronisław Komorowski
- Prime Minister: Donald Tusk; Ewa Kopacz
- Preceded by: Stanisław Kalemba
- Succeeded by: Krzysztof Jurgiel
- In office 16 November 2007 – 26 July 2012
- President: Lech Kaczyński; Bronisław Komorowski (Acting); Bogdan Borusewicz (Acting); Grzegorz Schetyna (Acting); Bronisław Komorowski
- Prime Minister: Donald Tusk
- Preceded by: Wojciech Mojzesowicz
- Succeeded by: Stanisław Kalemba

Member of the Sejm
- Incumbent
- Assumed office 14 October 1993
- Constituency: 18 – Siedlce

Personal details
- Born: 8 April 1958 (age 68) Sawice-Dwór, Poland
- Party: Polish People's Party

Marek Wacław Sawicki (Note: Polish pronunciation: [ˈmarɛk saˈvʲitskʲi]) (born 8 April 1958) is a Polish politician who has been serving as a member of the Sejm since 1993. He also served as Minister of Agriculture and Rural Development on two occasions.

== Education and early career ==
Sawicki studied agriculture. He later spent two years teaching and worked at the Ministry of Telecommunications.

== Political career ==
Sawicki was elected to the Sejm on 25 September 2005, receiving 6527 votes in 18 Siedlce district as a candidate on the Polish People's Party list. He later served as a member of Sejm 1993-1997, Sejm 1997-2001, Sejm 2001-2005, Sejm 2005–2007, Sejm 2007–2011, Sejm 2011–2015, Sejm 2015–2019, Sejm 2019-2023 and Sejm 2023–2027.

Sawicki was first appointed to the post of Minister of Agriculture and Rural Development on 16 November 2007 and left on 26 July 2012. On 17 March 2014 he then took over from Stanisław Kalemba and served until the Cabinet of Beata Szydło was sworn in on 16 November 2015. When Poland held the rotating presidency of the Council of the European Union in 2011, he chaired the Agriculture and Fisheries Council (AGRIFISH). In December 2011, the AGRIFISH under the presidency of Sawicki adopted a decision authorizing the signing of an anti-counterfeiting trade agreement (ACTA).

On 6 November 2023, President Andrzej Duda announced he would name Sawicki as the Senior Marshal of the new Sejm elected in October. He was appointed on 9 November 2023, performing his function on 13 November 2023 in the Sejm.

== See also ==
- Members of Polish Sejm 2005-2007
