= Janusz Wojciechowski =

Polish politician

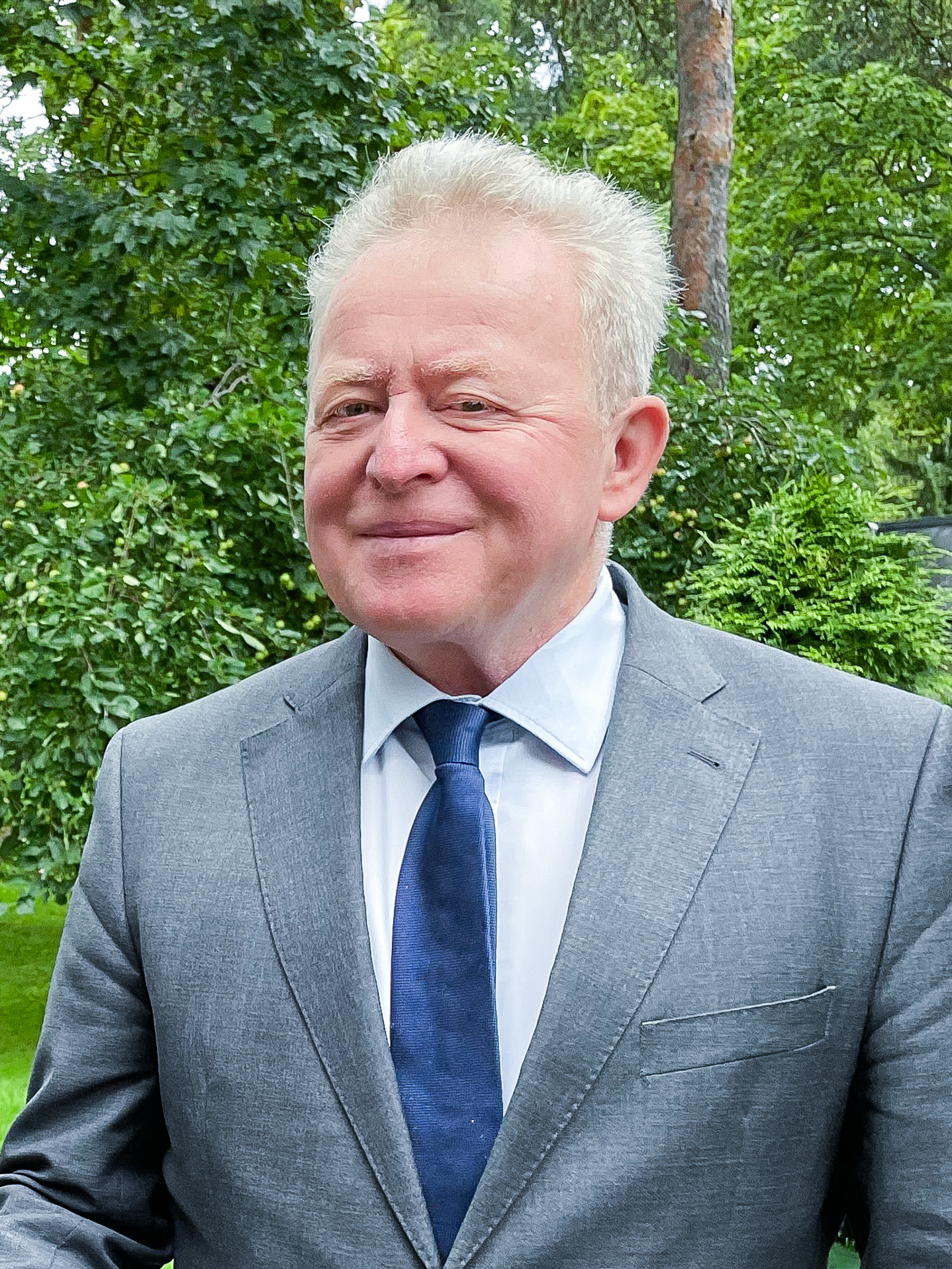
- Wojciechowski in 2023

European Commissioner for Agriculture
- In office 1 December 2019 – 30 November 2024
- Commission: Von der Leyen I
- Preceded by: Phil Hogan
- Succeeded by: Christophe Hansen

President of the Supreme Audit Office
- In office 22 June 1995 – 20 July 2001

Member of the Sejm
- In office 14 October 1993 – 21 June 1995
- In office 19 October 2001 – 13 June 2004

Personal details
- Born: 6 December 1954 (age 71) Rawa Mazowiecka, Poland
- Party: Polish People's Party (Before 2006); Piast (2006–2010); Law and Justice (2010–present)
- Other political affiliations: European People's Party (Before 2005); Union for Europe of the Nations (2005–2009); European Conservatives and Reformists (2009–present)
- Children: 2
- Education: University of Łódź

Janusz Czesław Wojciechowski (born 6 December 1954) is a Polish politician of Law and Justice who served as European Commissioner for Agriculture in the Von der Leyen Commission I from 2019 to 2024. He previously served as Member of the European Parliament (MEP) from 2004 to 2016 and as the Polish member of the European Court of Auditors from 2016 to 2019.

Wojciechowski was member of United People's Party, a Member of the Bureau of the European People's Party (EPP) from 2004 to 2006 and was vice-chair of the European Parliament's Committee on Agriculture and Rural Development. He was dismissed from the PSL following his decision to leave the EPP for the Union for Europe of the Nations EU parliamentary grouping. Wojciechowski was a substitute for the Committee on Budgetary Control and a member of the Delegation to the EU-Kazakhstan, EU-Kyrgyzstan and EU-Uzbekistan Parliamentary Cooperation Committees, and for relations with Tajikistan, Turkmenistan and Mongolia.

He ran on the Law and Justice list in the 2009 election, despite not being a party member. In November 2010, he joined Law and Justice.

== Career ==
- 1977–1980: Articled to the public prosecutor
- 1980–1993: Judge on the district court of Rawa Mazowiecka, judge on the provincial court of Skierniewice, judge on the appellate court of Warsaw
- 1995–2001: President of the Supreme Chamber of Control
- 1993–1995, 2001–2004: Member of Parliament of the Polish Republic
- 1994–1995: Under-secretary of State at the Cabinet Office for legislative affairs
- 1995–1999: Member of the Administration of EUROSAI – European Organisation of Supreme Audit Institutions
- 2001–2004: Vice-marshal of the Parliament of the Republic of Poland, Chairman of the Codifying Changes Committee
- 2003-2002: Member of the Chief Executive Committee of the Polish People's Party (PSL)
- 2004–2005: Chairman PSL
- 2003–2004: Observer to the EP
- 2004-2016: Member of the EP
- 2016-2019: Member of the European Court of Auditors
- 2019-2024: European Commissioner for Agriculture

== See also ==
- 2004 European Parliament election in Poland

Political offices
Preceded by Elżbieta Bieńkowska	Polish European Commissioner; 2019–present	Incumbent
Preceded by Phil Hogan	European Commissioner for Agriculture; 2019–present	Incumbent
