= Janusz Piechociński =

Polish politician

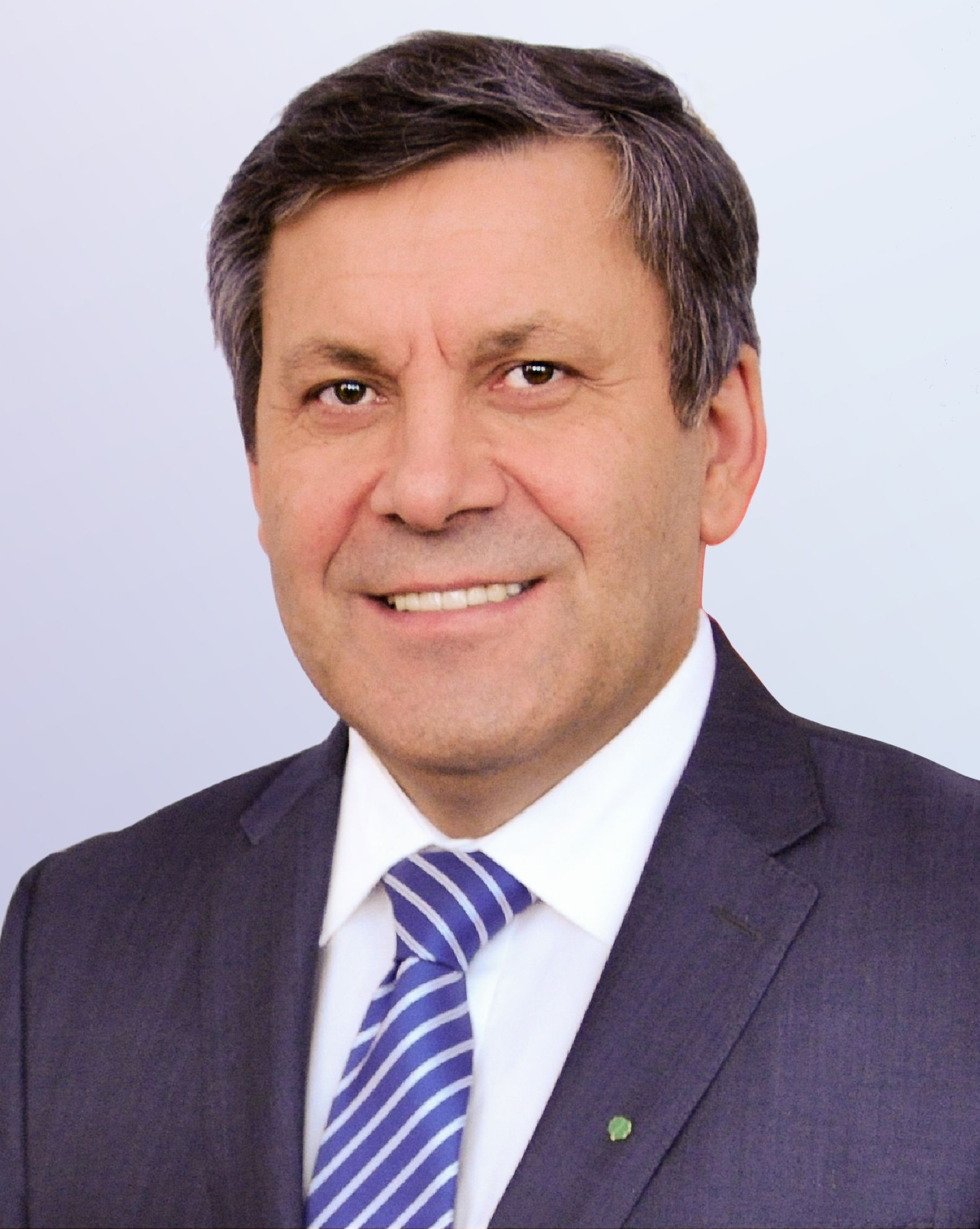
- Piechociński in 2013

Deputy Prime Minister of Poland
- In office 6 December 2012 – 16 November 2015
- President: Bronisław Komorowski; Andrzej Duda
- Prime Minister: Donald Tusk; Ewa Kopacz
- Preceded by: Waldemar Pawlak
- Succeeded by: Piotr Gliński; Jarosław Gowin; Mateusz Morawiecki

Minister of the Economy
- In office 6 December 2012 – 16 November 2015
- President: Bronisław Komorowski; Andrzej Duda
- Prime Minister: Donald Tusk; Ewa Kopacz
- Preceded by: Waldemar Pawlak
- Succeeded by: office abolished

Leader of the Polish People's Party
- In office 17 November 2012 – 7 November 2015
- Preceded by: Waldemar Pawlak
- Succeeded by: Władysław Kosiniak-Kamysz

Personal details
- Born: 15 March 1960 (age 66) Studzianki, (Note: Known as Studzianki till 1969. The current name of a city is Studzianki Pancerne) Poland
- Party: Polish People's Party
- Education: Warsaw School of Economics
- Awards: Cross of Merit (Poland) Order of the Cross of Terra Mariana
- Website: www.piechocinski.pl

Janusz Piechociński (born 15 March 1960) is a Polish politician, Minister of the Economy and Deputy Prime Minister of Poland from 6 December 2012 to 16 November 2015. From 17 November 2012 to 7 November 2015 he was President of the Polish People's Party.

== Notes ==
Party political offices
Preceded by Waldemar Pawlak	Leader of the Polish People's Party; 2012–2015	Succeeded by Władysław Kosiniak-Kamysz
Political offices
Preceded by Waldemar Pawlak	Deputy Prime Minister of Poland; 2012–2015	Succeeded by Jarosław Gowin
Preceded by Waldemar Pawlak	Minister of the Economy; 2012–2015	Succeeded by office abolished
