= Waldemar Pawlak =

43rd and 45th Prime Minister of Poland (1992; 1993–1995)

Brigadier General Waldemar Pawlak
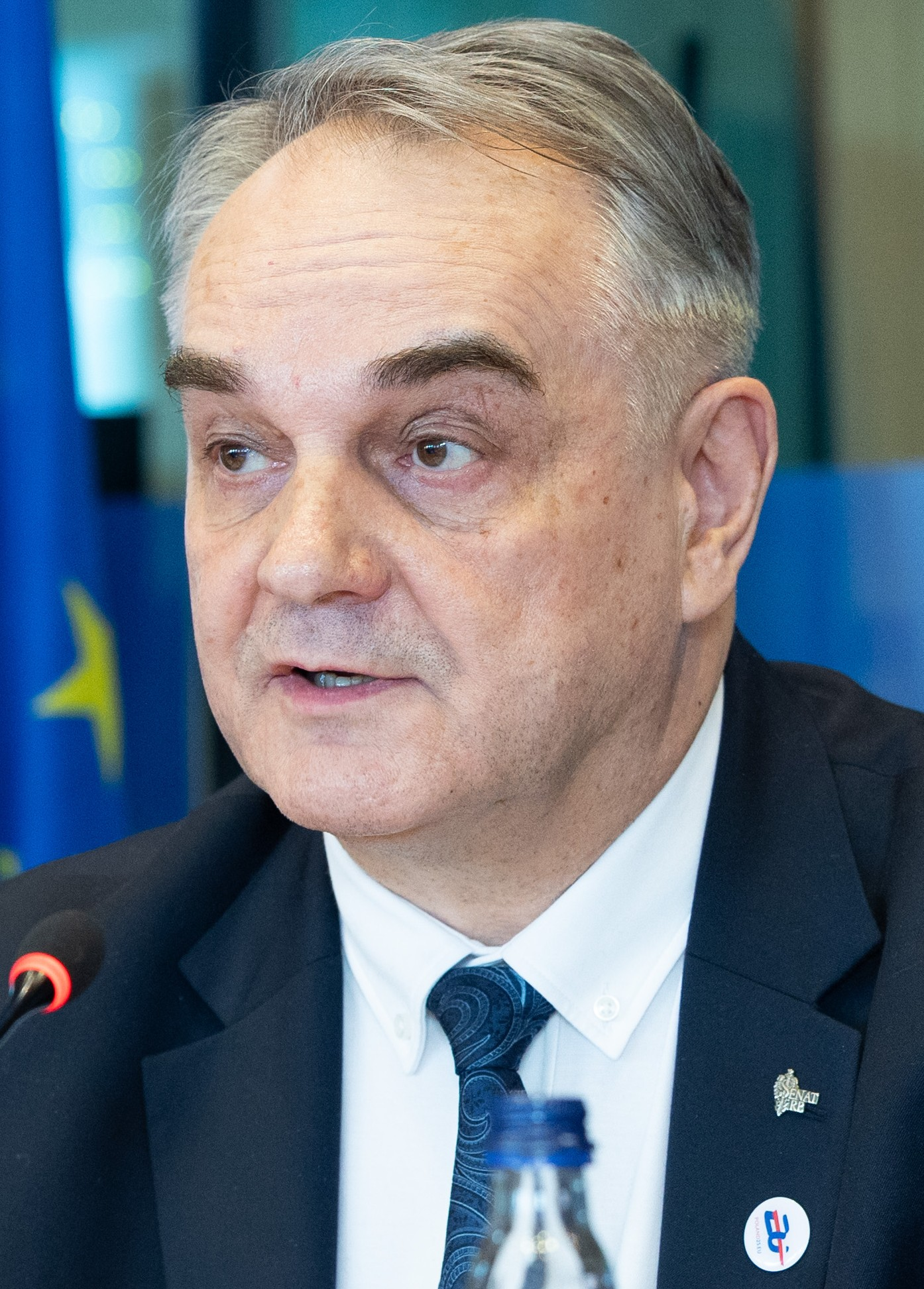
- Pawlak in 2025

Prime Minister of Poland
- In office 26 October 1993 – 6 March 1995
- President: Lech Wałęsa
- Deputy: Aleksander Łuczak; Marek Borowski; Włodzimierz Cimoszewicz
- Preceded by: Hanna Suchocka
- Succeeded by: Józef Oleksy
- Caretaker; 5 June 1992 – 10 July 1992
- President: Lech Wałęsa
- Preceded by: Jan Olszewski
- Succeeded by: Hanna Suchocka

Deputy Prime Minister of Poland
- In office 16 November 2007 – 27 November 2012
- Prime Minister: Donald Tusk
- Preceded by: Zyta Gilowska; Przemysław Gosiewski
- Succeeded by: Janusz Piechociński

Minister of Economy
- In office 16 November 2007 – 27 November 2012
- Prime Minister: Donald Tusk
- Deputy: Adam Szejnfeld
- Preceded by: Piotr Woźniak
- Succeeded by: Janusz Piechociński

Leader of the Polish People's Party
- In office 29 January 2005 – 17 November 2012
- Preceded by: Janusz Wojciechowski
- Succeeded by: Janusz Piechociński
- In office 29 June 1991 – 11 October 1997
- Preceded by: Roman Bartoszcze
- Succeeded by: Jarosław Kalinowski

Member of the Sejm
- In office 18 June 1989 – 11 November 2015
- Constituency: 16 – Płock

Member of the Senate
- Incumbent
- Assumed office 13 November 2023

Personal details
- Born: 5 September 1959 (age 66) Model, Poland
- Party: Polish People's Party
- Spouse: Elżbieta Pawlak
- Profession: Mechanician, farmer, teacher
- Awards: Order for Merits to Lithuania Order of Saint-Charles Royal Norwegian Order of Merit Order of Merit (Portugal)

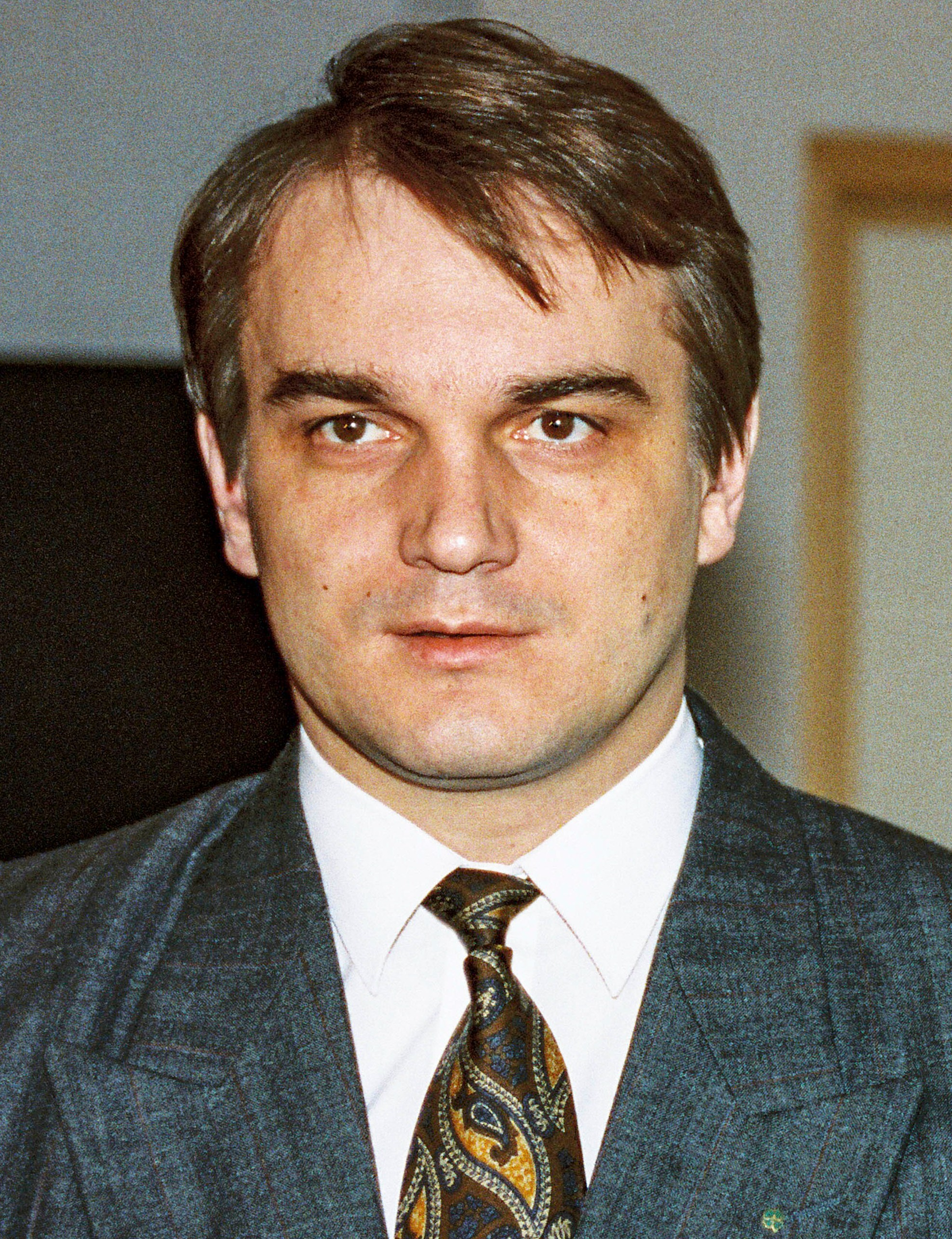
Pawlak in 1994

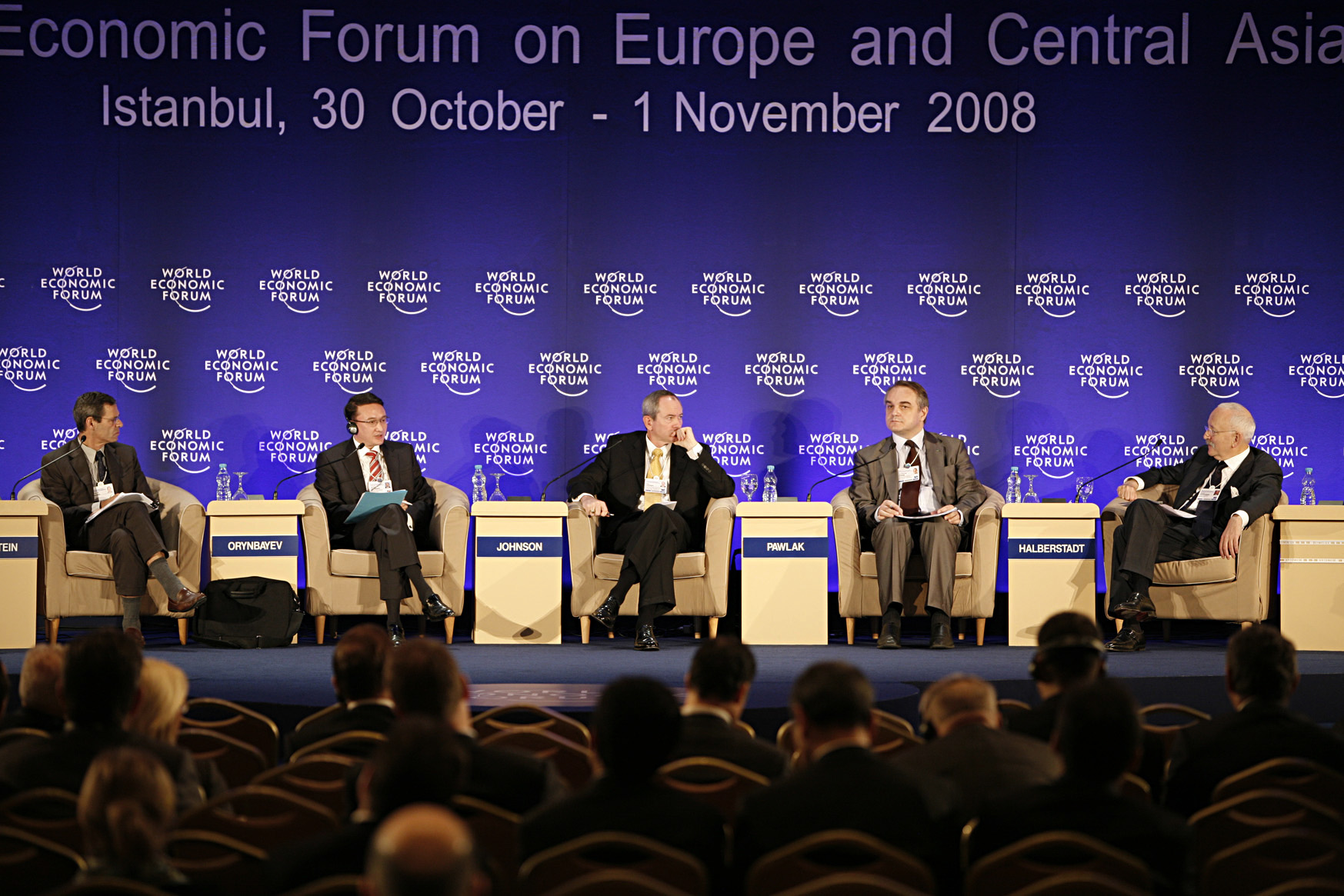
Deputy Prime Minister W. Pawlak at the World Economic Forum on Europe and Central Asia in Istanbul 2008

Waldemar Pawlak [valˈdɛmar ˈpavlak] (born 5 September 1959) is a Polish politician. He has twice served as Prime Minister of Poland, briefly in 1992 and again from 1993 to 1995. From November 2007 to November 2012 he served as Deputy Prime Minister and the Minister of Economy. Pawlak remains Poland's youngest prime minister to date.

He is also a long-time commander of the Polish Volunteer fire department, holding the rank of Brigadier General. Since 2015 Pawlak is workstream leader for the AMU (Agency for the Modernisation of Ukraine), where he contributes his expertise in economy.

== Early life, education and early political career ==
Pawlak was born in the village of Model, Masovian Voivodeship on 5 September 1959. He is a graduate of the Warsaw University of Technology, completing his education with an engineering degree. While he was a student, he actively participated in student strikes against Poland's martial law policy from 1981 to 1983. Following his graduation, he briefly ran a small 17-hectare farm in eastern Poland. This move would help popularize him with Polish farmers during his later political career.

In 1984, Pawlak became a computer teacher in Kamionka (near Pacyna). His political career began in 1985, when he joined the United People's Party. After 1990, like many UPP members, he joined the UPP's successor, the Polish People's Party. He was elected from UPP office to the Contract Sejm (1989) and has remained a member of Sejm since then. He became leader (Prezes) of the UPP in 1991.

== Premiership of Waldemar Pawlak ==
=== First Premiership ===
On 5 June 1992, 00:00 AM, after a vote of no confidence was approved, with 273 in favour and 119 against, Jan Olszewski was forced to resign as prime minister and his cabinet was immediately replaced in an event known as the nightshift ("Nocna zmiana"). After Olszewski's dismissal, President Lech Wałęsa designated the little-known and inexperienced Pawlak as caretaker prime minister with the mission, to form a new coalition government with agrarians, Christian democrats and liberals. Pawlak's potential partners, the Democratic Union and the Confederation of Independent Poland were not ready to agree on a compromise programme. The fact was that Pawlak and nobody else was called upon to form a new government that was nevertheless a remarkable phenomenon. According to Aleksander Kwaśniewski, it was a 'historical step' towards a 'normalization' of Polish political and party life.

After 33 days as a caretaker, Pawlak failed to gain support from the Sejm majority and failed in a vote of confidence. Pawlak was forced to resign as prime minister and the President replaced him with Hanna Suchocka, who won support from the majority and successfully formed a coalition with the Democratic Union, Christian National Union, Liberal Democratic Congress, Peasants' Agreement, People's Christian Party, Party of Christian Democrats and Polish Beer-Lovers' Party. Pawlak's failure paved the way for another political coalition.

Since Pawlak's first cabinet did not receive support from the Sejm, at this time, Pawlak had no official ministers, only temporary chiefs of executive branches. His first cabinet was the briefest government during this period that lasted only 33 days, this was a notable period commonly known as Pawlak's 33 days (33 dni Pawlaka). Although Pawlak failed to form a government, he gained considerable respect from his 33 days in office, and the experiences gained from this short stint in office helped him win his second premiership in 1993.

=== Second Premiership ===
The Polish People's Party and the social democratic, post-communist Democratic Left Alliance (SLD) won the 1993 election in a landslide, holding a super-majority and the support of the socialist-agrarian government, with Pawlak as prime minister again. Although Pawlaks cabinet included Józef Oleksy of the SLD as Sejm Marshal, influential SLD leader Aleksander Kwaśniewski remained a Sejm Member without any special appointments.

Following this slight, Prime Minister Pawlak and Kwaśniewski soon found themselves at bitter political odds. Kwaśniewski reportedly had an ambition to become "Prime Minister de facto", while Pawlak wanted to retain the power of his office. Both leaders used their parties to fight for power.

Pawlak was initially in an informal alliance with President Wałęsa against the SLD. However, their good political relations soon dissipated.

In 1995, Pawlak offered three options to Kwaśniewski. First, he would remain prime minister but with Kwaśniewski as Deputy and Minister of Foreign Affairs. Second, the Democratic Left Alliance would form a government with Kwaśniewski as prime minister. Third, Oleksy would become prime minister under the present coalition. Pawlak reportedly thought that Kwaśniewski would not risk a minority Democratic Left Alliance government without the support of the majority of the elevation of his main partisan opponent, Oleksy, to prime minister and therefore rather be the deputy of Pawlak. However, Kwaśniewski surprised many by choosing the third option.

Pawlak was known for his reticence and aversion to journalists. The opposition and the media accused him of a lack of dynamism and a terrible information policy. Pawlak gave up the prime ministerial Volvo 780 limousine in favour of a FSO Polonez Caro, equipped with a Rover V8 engine to show solidarity with the automotive industry in Poland. This gesture was well received by Poles at a time when the country was suffering poverty.

In terms of policy, Pawlak pushed for many leftist reforms while in office, striving for improved workers rights and corporate accountability. Despite this socialist platform, Pawlak did very little to slow the trend of privatization that swept through Poland in the 1990s. In many ways, Pawlak was seen as an agrarian that represented the Polish farmer first and foremost.

== In the political wilderness ==
Despite good public approval ratings Pawlak failed in his bid for the Presidency in 1995, finishing a distant fifth (after Kwaśniewski, Wałęsa, Jacek Kuroń and Jan Olszewski) and winning only 770,417 votes (4.31%).

After losing the political battle with Kwaśniewski and, after that, the presidential election, there was a movement to replace Pawlak with Jarosław Kalinowski as party leader in 1997.

The PSL suffered a great political disaster during the 1997 parliamentary elections and became the smallest party in the Sejm (from 132 seats in 1993 to just 27).

After the SLD won decisively in the 2001 parliamentary election Kalinowski became deputy of the new Prime Minister Leszek Miller when the PSL joined the coalition. Pawlak did not play a major role during this period.

== 2005 political comeback ==
Pawlak became leader of the PSL in 2005 after a period of internal turmoil caused by a steady decline in the party's popularity. Following this political victory, Pawlak became Deputy Prime Minister and Minister of Economy in the liberal Civic Platform (PO)-PSL government, formed after the 2007 parliamentary election, under Prime Minister Donald Tusk.

Although PSL remained the smallest party represented in the Sejm, Pawlak is often cited as having achieved a major political victory. During his time in the party chair his party enjoyed better electoral results, the elimination of major competition among agrarian voters from the also agrarian dominated party (Samoobrona), and the resumption of major influence in rural areas. Additionally, PSL was put in charge of three cabinet posts in the Tusk government. (Without the PSL votes, the PO would not have a Sejm majority, even though it easily accounts for the biggest political group in the sitting parliament.)

On 21 April 2010, PSL announced that Pawlak would be the party's official candidate for the 2010 presidential election. He received only 1.75% of the vote and didn't get into the second round.

In 2023 he was elected to the Senate, the upper house of the Polish parliament.

== Personal life ==
Pawlak is married and has 2 children.

== Second Waldemar Pawlak cabinet ==
Members of Pawlak's cabinet:

- Prime Minister: Waldemar Pawlak (PSL)
- Deputy PM and Minister of Finance: Marek Borowski (SLD)
- Deputy PM and Minister of Justice: Włodzimierz Cimoszewicz (SLD)
- Deputy PM and Minister of Education: Aleksander Łuczak (PSL)
- Minister of Construction: Barbara Blida (SLD)
- Minister of Culture: Kazimierz Dejmek (PSL)
- Minister of Property Conversion: Wiesław Kaczmarek (SLD)
- Minister of Defense: Piotr Kołodziejczyk
- Minister of Transport: Bogusław Liberadzki (SLD)
- Minister of Interior: Andrzej Milczanowski
- Minister of Labor: Leszek Miller (SLD)
- Minister of Foreign Affairs: Andrzej Olechowski
- Director of the CUP (Central Planning Office): Mirosław Pietrewicz (PSL)
- Minister of Economic Cooperation with Foreign Business: Lesław Podkański (PSL)
- Minister of Industry and Trade: Marek Pol (UP)
- Director of the URM (the Cabinet Office): Michał Strąk (PSL)
- Minister of Agriculture: Andrzej Śmietanko (PSL)
- Minister of Communications: Andrzej Zieliński (PSL)
- Minister of Environment Preservation: Andrzej Żelichowski (SLD)
- Minister of Health: Ryszard Żochowski (SLD)
- President of the Committee for Scientific Research: Witold Karczewski

Political offices
Preceded by Jan Olszewski	Prime Minister of Poland; 1992	Succeeded by Hanna Suchocka
Preceded by Hanna Suchocka	Prime Minister of Poland; 1993–1995	Succeeded by Józef Oleksy
Preceded by Zyta Gilowska	Deputy Prime Minister of Poland with Grzegorz Schetyna (2007–2009); 2007–2012	Succeeded by Janusz Piechociński
Preceded by Przemysław Gosiewski	Deputy Prime Minister of Poland with Grzegorz Schetyna (2007–2009); 2007–2012	Succeeded by Janusz Piechociński
Preceded by Piotr Woźniak	Minister of Economy; 2007–2012	Succeeded by Janusz Piechociński
Party political offices
Preceded by Roman Bartoszcze	Leader of the Polish People's Party; 1991–1997	Succeeded by Jarosław Kalinowski
Preceded by Janusz Wojciechowski	Leader of the Polish People's Party; 2005–2012	Succeeded by Janusz Piechociński
