= Jarosław Kalinowski =

Polish politician (born 1962)

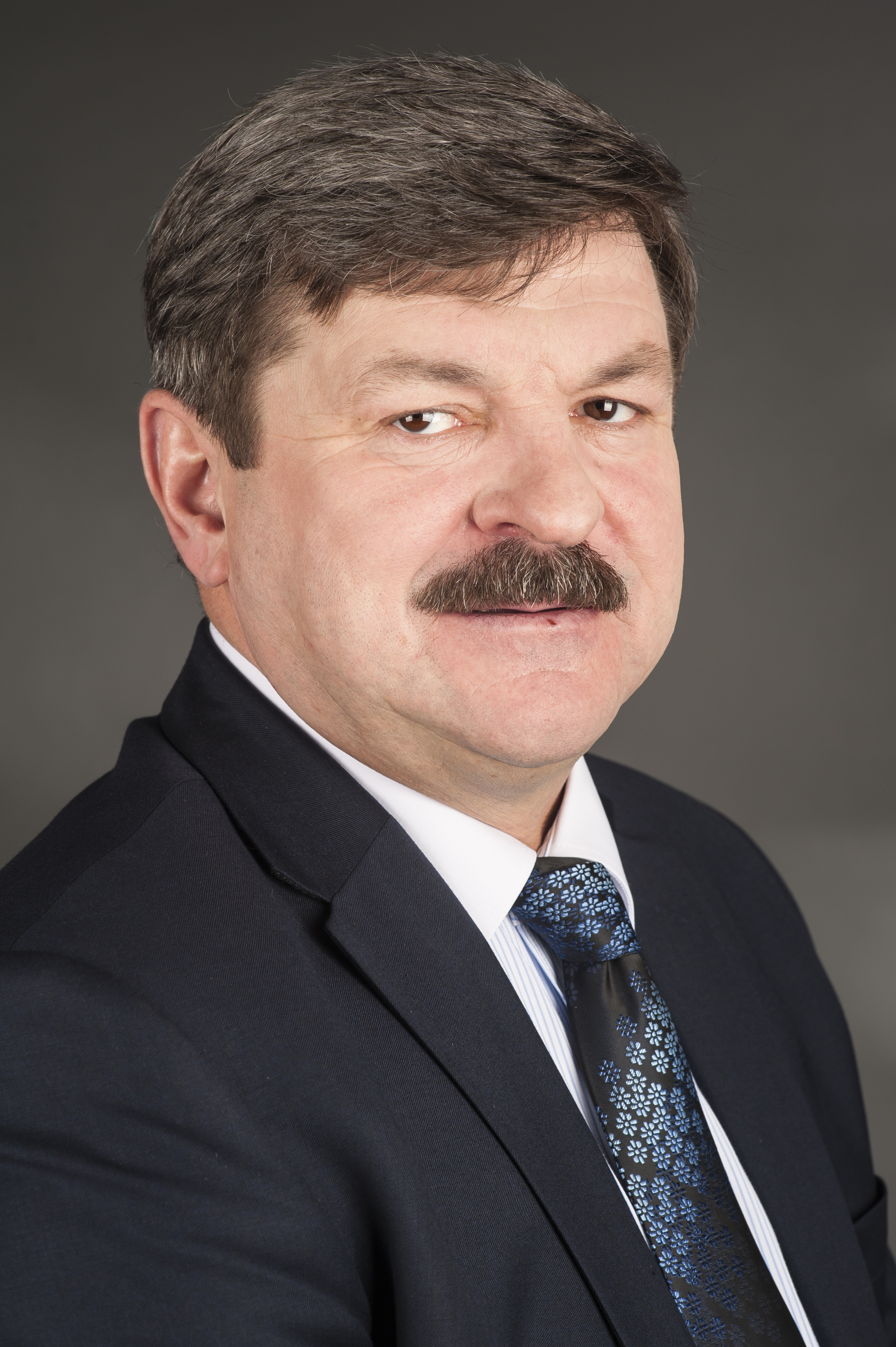
- Kalinowski in 2014

Member of the European Parliament
- In office 7 June 2009 – 16 July 2024
- Constituency: Poland

Deputy Prime Minister of Poland
- In office 19 October 2001 – 3 March 2003
- President: Aleksander Kwaśniewski
- Prime Minister: Leszek Miller
- In office 25 April 1997 – 31 October 1997
- President: Aleksander Kwaśniewski
- Prime Minister: Włodzimierz Cimoszewicz

Minister of Agriculture and Rural Development
- In office 19 October 2001 – 3 March 2003
- President: Aleksander Kwaśniewski
- Prime Minister: Leszek Miller

Member of the Sejm
- In office 14 October 1993 – 10 June 2009
- Constituency: 18 – Siedlce

Personal details
- Born: 1962 (age 63–64)
- Party: Polish People's Party

Jarosław Kalinowski (Note: Polish pronunciation: [jaˈrɔswaf kaliˈnɔfskʲi]) (born 12 April 1962) is a Polish politician from the agrarian Polish People's Party (PSL).

Kalinowski was born in Wyszków. He was first elected to the Sejm in 1993, and was reelected in the subsequent elections of 1997, 2001, 2005 and 2007. At the 2005 legislative elections of 25 September, he gained 15,855 votes in the 18th electoral (Siedlce) district. He was reelected to the Sejm once again at the legislative elections of 21 October 2007.

Kalinowski was deputy Prime Minister and Minister for Agriculture from April to October 1997, in the cabinet of Wlodzimierz Cimoszewicz. He was returned to both these positions again from October 2001 to March 2003, in the cabinet of Leszek Miller. Kalinowski succeeded Waldemar Pawlak as the leader of the PSL party in November 1997 and he held this position to March 2004. He contested the Polish presidential election as the PSL candidate in 2000 (5.95% of votes), and again in the following presidential elections of 2005 (1.8% of votes). Following the 2005 Polish legislative elections, he was elected to the position of Vice-Marshal of the Sejm of the Republic of Poland (deputy Speaker of the lower house) in November. He was reelected to this position following the legislative elections of 2007.

On 7 June 2009 Kalinowski was elected Member of European Parliament (MEP) from Masovian Voivodeship constituency, gaining 51,014 of the votes.

== See also ==
- Members of Polish Sejm 1993-1997
- Members of Polish Sejm 1997-2001
- Members of Polish Sejm 2001-2005
- Members of Polish Sejm 2005-2007
- Members of Polish Sejm 2007-2011
