= List of Polish People's Party politicians =

A list of notable Polish politicians of the Polish People's Party (Polish: Polskie Stronnictwo Ludowe).

== A ==
- Tomasz Adamczuk
- Jan Adamiak
- Kazimierz Adamski
- Norbert Aleksiewicz
- Jan Andrykiewicz

== B ==
- Tadeusz Balcerowski
- Roman Bartoszcze
- Edmund Borawski
- Wojciech Borzuchowski

== C ==
- Józef Cepil

== D ==
- Kazimierz Dejmek
- Leszek Deptuła
- Zbigniew Deptuła
- Janusz Dobrosz
- Bronisław Dutka
- Maria Dziuba

== G ==
- Ludomir Goździkiewicz
- Józef Gruszka
- Eugeniusz Grzeszczak
- Andrzej Grzyb
- Michał Górski

== H ==
- Danuta Hojarska

== J ==
- Romuald Jankowski
- Mieczysław Janowski
- Adam Jarubas
- Antoni Jaszczak

== K ==
- Stanisław Kalemba
- Jarosław Kalinowski
- Franciszek Kamiński
- Ewa Kierzkowska
- Zbigniew Komorowski
- Mikołaj Kozakiewicz
- Janusz Kołodziej
- Mirosław Krajewski
- Rafał Kubacki
- Maria Kurnatowska
- Zbigniew Kuźmiuk
- Eugeniusz Kłopotek

== M ==
- Jan Majewski
- Janusz Maksymiuk
- Mirosław Maliszewski
- Wojciech Mojzesowicz
- Leszek Murzyn

== N ==
- Waldemar Nowakowski

== O ==
- Maria Olszewska
- Jerzy Osiński
- Krystyna Ozga

== P ==
- Mirosław Pawlak
- Waldemar Pawlak
- Andrzej Pałys
- Janusz Piechociński
- Zdzisław Podkański
- Bogdan Pęk

== R ==
- Krzysztof Rutkowski
- Stanisław Rydzoń
- Erwina Ryś-Ferens

== S ==
- Marek Sawicki
- Czesław Siekierski
- Wojciech Siemion
- Ryszard Smolarek
- Henryk Smolarz
- Aleksander Sopliński
- Zbigniew Sosnowski
- Ryszard Stanibuła
- Franciszek Stefaniuk
- Adam Struzik
- Tadeusz Sławecki

== W ==
- Ewa Więckowska
- Wiesław Woda
- Janusz Wojciechowski
- Edward Wojtas
- Zbigniew Włodkowski

== Z ==
- Józef Zych

== Ł ==
- Jan Łopata

== Ż ==
- Stanisław Żelichowski
