= Adamiak =

Adamiak (Polish pronunciation: [aˈdamjak]) is a surname originating from Poland. It is a Polish pet name for Adam. The name may refer to:

- Dirk Adamiak (born 1970), German record producer and musician
- Elżbieta Adamiak (born 1964), Polish Roman Catholic theologian.
- Jan Adamiak (born 1948), Polish politician
- Patrick Adamiak, US Navy sailor and jailed gun dealer
