= Smoliar =

Smoliar or Smolyar is an East Slavic surname, a transliteration from Cyrillic 'Смоляр', literally meaning the occupation of wood distiller, see pl:Smolarz. Notable people with the surname include:

- Alexander Smolyar, Russian racing driver
- Artem Smoliar, Russian male volleyball player

== See also ==
- Smolar
- Smolarz (disambiguation)
