= Palys =

Palys or Pałys is a Polish surname. Notable people with the surname include:

- Andrzej Pałys (born 1957), Polish politician
- Renata Pałys (born 1956), Polish actress
- Stan Palys (1930–2021), American baseball player
