= Federal Correctional Institution, Fort Dix =

Low-security prison in New Jersey, US

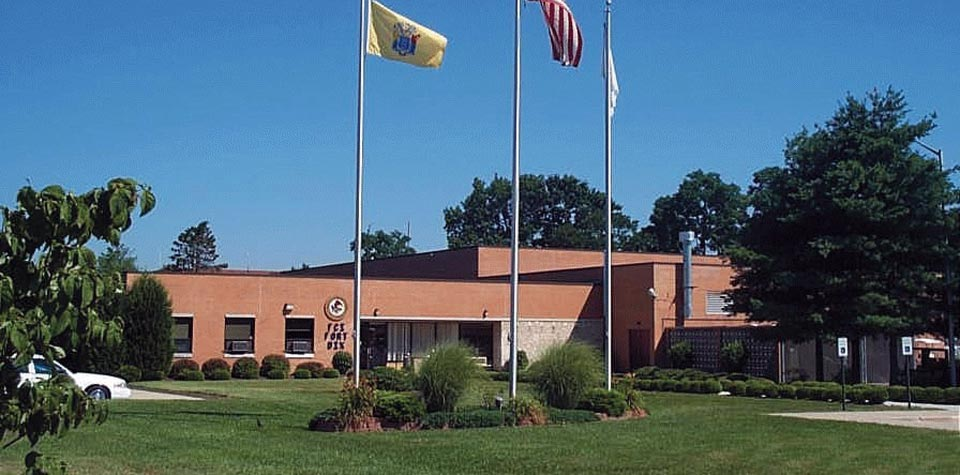
- Front view of the prison
- Interactive map of Federal Correctional Institution, Fort Dix
- Location: Fort Dix, New Jersey; 39.9984°N 74.6137°W
- Status: Operational
- Security class: Low-security (with minimum-security prison camp)
- Population: 4,070 (328 in prison camp)
- Managed by: Federal Bureau of Prisons

The Federal Correctional Institution, Fort Dix (FCI Fort Dix) is a low-security United States federal prison for male offenders in New Jersey. It is operated by the Federal Bureau of Prisons. A satellite prison camp houses minimum-security male inmates.

FCI Fort Dix is located in Burlington County on the ASA Fort Dix entity of Joint base McGuire-Dix-Lakehurst. It is approximately 40 miles (64 km) from Philadelphia. The prison is in the Fort Dix census-designated place, and also within New Hanover Township, New Jersey.

Fort Dix is the largest federal prison in the United States in terms of inmates housed.

It is divided up into three compounds: The separate East and West Compounds (both low-level, each constituting a single prison in its own right), and a camp between the two.

== Notable incidents ==
=== Identity theft ring ===
In early 2010, a joint FBI and Federal Bureau of Prisons investigation found that Dimorio McDowell (50711–019), an inmate at FCI Fort Dix, was operating a major identity theft ring from the prison. Eight co-conspirators, with whom McDowell communicated by telephone, were also arrested. The ring targeted credit cards issued by major chain stores such as Macy's, Saks Fifth Avenue, Staples, Home Depot, Lowes and others. McDowell and his co-conspirators obtained the personal information of credit card holders through customer service departments and added themselves as authorized users. When McDowell's co-conspirators went to make purchases, they showed false identification or provided the last four digits of the cardholder's Social Security number and charged high-end items such as a John Deere tractor, big-screen televisions, snow blowers and stoves. The companies that issued the cards, including Citigroup Financial, HSBC and GE Capital, lost between $500,000 and $1 million.

McDowell subsequently pleaded guilty to aggravated identity theft and conspiracy to commit wire fraud and bank fraud and was sentenced to 14 additional years in prison on January 18, 2011. McDowell is currently incarcerated at the United States Penitentiary in Atlanta, which has a Communication Management Unit, where inmate contact with the outside world is severely restricted and tightly monitored. He is scheduled for release in 2028.

== Notable inmates (current and former) ==
=== High-profile inmates ===
Inmate name	Register number	Photo	Status	Details
Christopher Coke	02257-748		Serving a 23-year sentence; scheduled for release in 2029.	Leader of the Jamaican drug gang Shower Posse.
Sean Combs	37452-054		Serving a 50-month sentence; scheduled for release on February 20th, 2028. Transferred to FCI Allenwood Low.	Record producer and executive known professionally as "Diddy". Convicted of two counts of transportation to engage in prostitution.
Martin Shkreli	87850-053		Released in 2022	Convicted of two counts of securities fraud and one count of conspiring to commit securities fraud.
Matthew Guglielmetti Jr.	10270-014		Released from custody in 2014; served 10 years.	Reputed New England crime boss of the Patriarca crime family; pled guilty to drug trafficking charges.
George Jung	19225-004		Released from custody in 2014; served 19 years.	Drug trafficker and former partner of drug kingpin Carlos Lehder; directed the shipment of thousands of tons of narcotics into the US in the 1970s and 1980s; pleaded guilty to drug trafficking in 1995; portrayed by Johnny Depp in the 2001 film Blow.

=== Politicians ===
Inmate name	Register number	Photo	Status	Details
Buddy Cianci	05000–070		Released from custody in 2007; served 4 years.	Mayor of Providence, Rhode Island, from 1975 to 1984 and 1991 to 2002; convicted in 2002 of racketeering for accepting bribes in exchange for city jobs from 1991 to 1999.
Kwame Kilpatrick	44678–039		Served 7 years of a 28-year sentence.	Former mayor of Detroit from 2002 to 2008, convicted in 2013 of racketeering, fraud, bribery and extortion.
Joe Ganim	14466–014		Released from custody in July 2010; Served 7 years	Mayor of Bridgeport, Connecticut, from 1991 to 2003 and 2015–present. Convicted in 2003 of 16 federal counts that include racketeering, extortion, racketeering conspiracy, bribery, bribery conspiracy, mail fraud, and tax fraud.
Rob Walker	90668–053		Was serving an 18-month sentence; released from custody on January 24, 2023.	Former Chief Deputy County Executive of Nassau County, New York from 2010 to 2018 convicted for obstruction of justice.
Bobby Henon	77029–066		Serving a 3.5-year sentence; scheduled for release in 2026.	Former majority leader and member of Philadelphia City Council. Convicted in November 2021 for political corruption involving former Philadelphia labor leader John Dougherty.

=== Fraudsters ===
Inmate name	Register number	Photo	Status	Details
Martin Frankel	14142–014		Released October 27, 2016; served 17 years.	Pleaded guilty in 2002 to racketeering and fraud for siphoning over $200 million from insurance premiums paid to companies he controlled in the 1990s; Frankel's story was featured on the CNBC television program American Greed.
Edward Porta	18862–058		Released October 1, 2019; served 38 months.	Pleaded guilty in 2005 for defrauding the U.S. Department of Agriculture of more than $400,000
Steven Hoffenberg	35601–054		Served 18 years of a twenty-year sentence; released on October 11, 2013	Former associate of Jeffrey Epstein convicted in 1997 for investment fraud
Ramon Abbas	54313–424		Serving a 135-month sentence; scheduled for release in 2029.	Instagram influencer also known as Hushpuppi convicted for conspiracy to launder money from business email compromise frauds and other scams
Caswell Senior	20180–509		serving a 188-month sentence; scheduled for release in 2039.	Rapper also known as Casanova Pleaded guilty in 2023 to racketeering and Narcotics Offences

=== Child pornographers ===
Inmate name	Register number	Photo	Status	Details
Richard Goldberg	14321-052		Transferred to FMC Devens; released on May 24, 2024.	Serial child molester and FBI Ten Most Wanted Fugitive until his capture in 2007; pleaded guilty in 2007 to producing child pornography, including images of himself engaging in sexual acts with underage girls.
Mike Lombardo	19900-052		Served a 5-year sentence; released on August 16, 2018.	Former musician pleaded guilty to receipt of child pornography.
Eric Justin Toth	32508-016		Serving a 25-year sentence; scheduled for release on August 8, 2034.	Former Washington, D.C. elementary school teacher and FBI Ten Most Wanted fugitive; apprehended in Nicaragua in 2013 after five years on the run; pleaded guilty in 2013 to production of child pornography.

=== Other ===
Inmate name	Register number	Photo	Status	Details
Patrick Tate Adamiak	95252–509		Serving a 20-Year sentence. Scheduled for release in 2042.	Former Navy Sailor and Gunbroker dealer convicted for illegally obtaining machine guns. It is alleged that the ATF committed perjury during his trial.
Casey Fury	07480–036		Serving a 17-year sentence; scheduled for release on August 19, 2027.	Former worker at the Portsmouth Naval Shipyard in Maine; pleaded guilty to arson for setting fire to the nuclear submarine USS Miami in 2012, injuring five firefighters and two sailors and causing $400 million in damage.
David Headley (a.k.a. Daood Sayed Gilani)	01783-265		In another prison for a different crime (released from federal prison on March 5, 1992)	After serving a drug sentence at Dix, he conspired in the 2008 Mumbai attacks.
Lee Mroszak	71424-053		Released on January 26, 2006.	Lee "Crazy Cabbie" Mroszak was a regular guest on the Howard Stern Show. During the November 9, 2004, live broadcast he stated that he had not filed or paid taxes for several years; an Internal Revenue Service employee happened to be listening to the show and reported Mroszak to their superiors at the IRS. He was sentenced to serve one year in FCI Fort Dix and pay his outstanding back taxes. On June 29, 2005, Mroszak was moved from FCI Fort Dix to the Federal Medical Center Devens in Ayer, Massachusetts.
Matthew Weigman	26937-038		Released on October 20, 2018.	Blind phreaker, sentenced to 11 years and 3 months for his part in a swatting conspiracy.
Paul Nicholas Miller	32607-509		Served a three-year and five-month sentence; released on July 3, 2023.	American far-right political commentator and streamer, known online as 'GypsyCrusader'. Miller is best known for recording himself interacting with strangers on the defunct video chat website Omegle, trying to outrage or provoke the people he was matched with; he would often do this while cosplaying various characters, most notably the DC Comics character the Joker. Miller was indicted on charges of possessing a firearm as convicted felon and possession of unregistered rifle on February 25, 2021, stemming from an incident that took place in January 2018.
Michael Parnell	96286-020		Transferred to FCI Butner. Serving a 20-year sentence; scheduled for release on October 1, 2031.	Former peanut broker convicted of conspiracy, fraud and other federal charges.
Tyler King	57919-177		Serving a six-year and six-month sentence; scheduled for release on June 26, 2024.	Tech CEO convicted of conspiracy to access a protected computer system. Also founder of A Voice From Prison, the first nonprofit of its kind which advocates for criminal justice from inside Federal prison.
Tyler Bradley Dykes	68636–510		Far-Right, White Nationalist; Currently serving a five-year sentence for participation in the January 6th, 2021 attacks on the US Capitol Building. Scheduled to be released October 22, 2028	Previously served 6 months in Virginia Correctional institute for participation in the 2017 Charlottesville, Virginia "Unite the Right" Rally. Former Marine and Intelligence expert discharged in 2022.

== See also ==
- List of U.S. federal prisons
- Incarceration in the United States
