= Smolar =

Smolar is a surname. Notable people with the surname include:

- Eugeniusz Smolar (born 1945), Polish journalist
- Adi Smolar (born 1959), Slovenian singer-songwriter and composer
- Aleksander Smolar (born 1940), Polish writer, political activist, and adviser
- Boris Smolar (1897–1986), Russian-born Jewish-American journalist and newspaper editor

== See also ==
- Smoler
- Smolarz (disambiguation)
- Smolarek
- Smoliar
