= Krasnystaw =

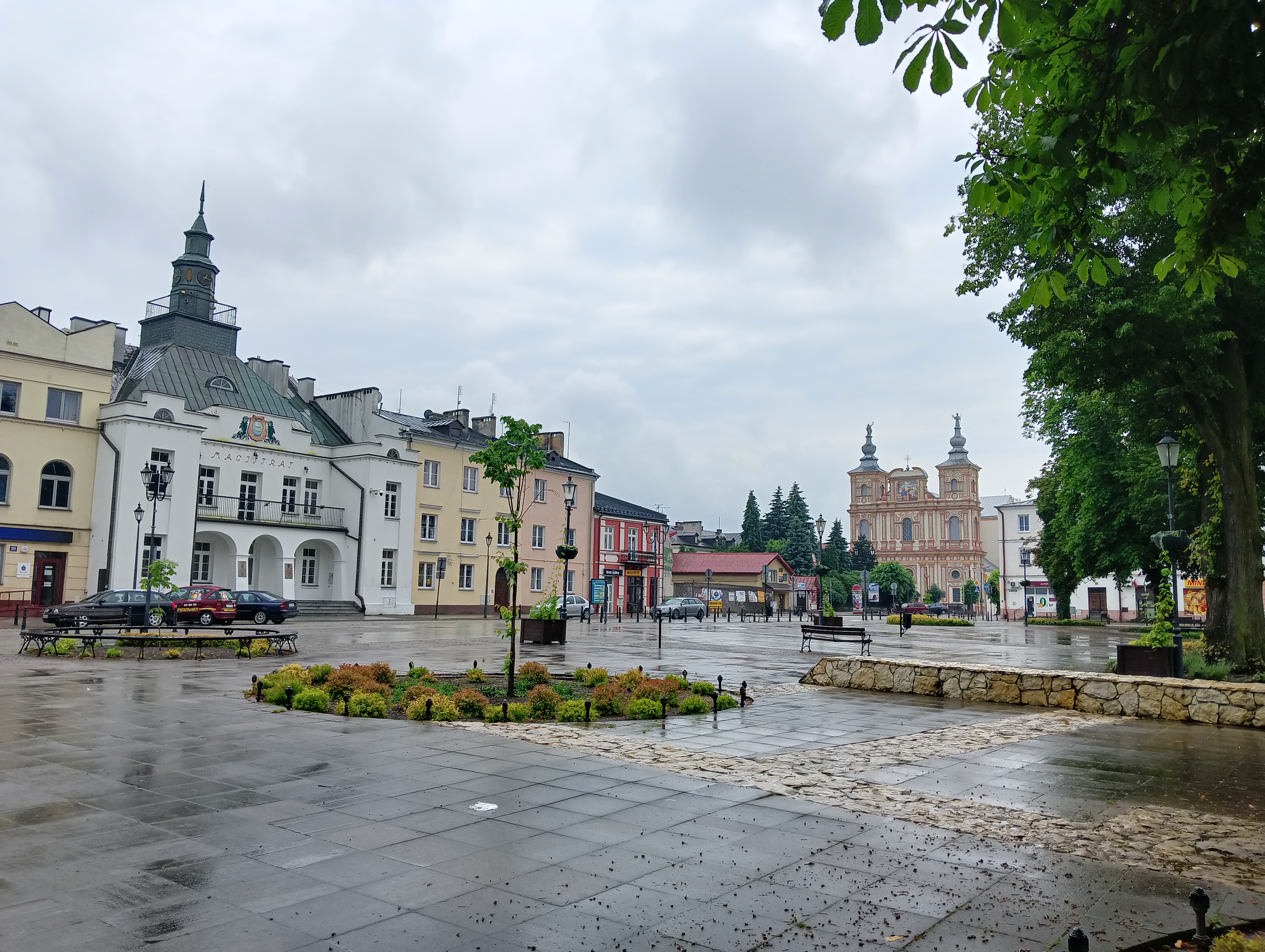
- Market square

- Flag Coat of arms

- Location within Poland
- Coordinates: 51°0′N 23°10′E
- Country: Poland
- Voivodeship: Lublin
- County: Krasnystaw
- Gmina: Krasnystaw (urban gmina)
- Town rights: 1394

Government
  - Mayor: Daniel Miciuła

Area
  - Total: 23.07 km^{2} (8.91 sq mi)

Population (2006)
  - Total: 19,434
  - Density: 842.4/km^{2} (2,182/sq mi)
- Time zone: UTC+1 (CET)
  - Summer (DST): UTC+2 (CEST)
- Postal code: 22–300
- Car plates: LKS
- Website: http://www.krasnystaw.pl

Krasnystaw [krasˈnɨstaf] is a town in southeastern Poland with 18,630 inhabitants (31 December 2019). It is the capital of Krasnystaw County in the Lublin Voivodeship.

The town is famous for its beer festival called Chmielaki (Polish: chmiel means hop), and for its dairy products like yogurt and kefir. The river Wieprz flows through Krasnystaw.

== History ==
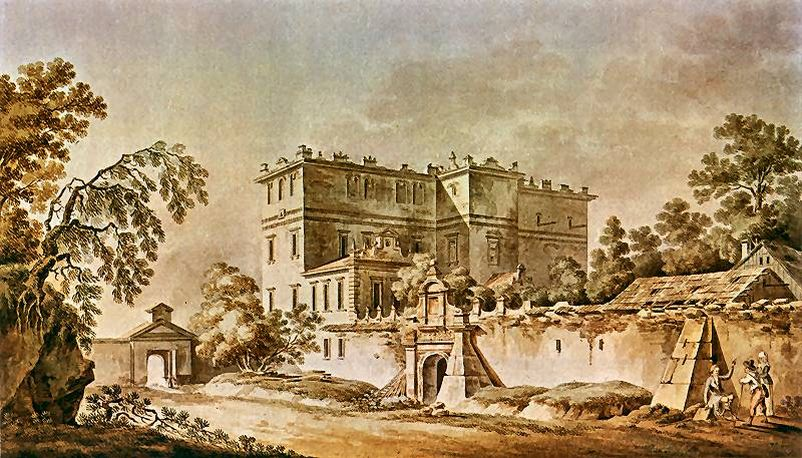
Krasnystaw Castle on a painting by Zygmunt Vogel from 1794

Krasnystaw received its town charter from King Władysław II Jagiełło, who signed the document in Kraków, on 1 March 1394. The new town was located in the location of previously existing village of Szczekarzew, and in 1490 – 1826, was property of the Bishops of Chełm, and the seat of a starosta. Due to convenient location along merchant route from Lublin to Lwów, it prospered in the 16th century.

The period known as Swedish wars (1655–1660) brought destruction of both the town and the Krasnystaw Castle. The 4th Polish National Cavalry Brigade was stationed in Krasnystaw in 1790. Following the Third Partition of Poland, Krasnystaw was in 1795 annexed by the Habsburg Empire. After the Polish victory in the Austro-Polish War of 1809, it was part of the short-lived Polish Duchy of Warsaw, and after its dissolution in 1815, until 1916, it was part of Russian-controlled Congress Poland. During the January Uprising, the town and its area saw heavy fighting between Polish rebels and Russian troops.

In 1916, Krasnystaw received rail connection, and in 1919, already in the Second Polish Republic, the town became seat of a county.

=== World War II ===
On 18–19 September 1939, during the Invasion of Poland, Polish troops of the 39th Infantry Division fought here with advancing Wehrmacht units. During World War II, numerous units of the Home Army and others operated in the area. The Germans blamed Jews for the resistance, and hanged seven. They then placed 40 Jews on the German front lines. About one third were killed. During the first months of their occupation, the Germans murdered both Christian and Jewish Poles.

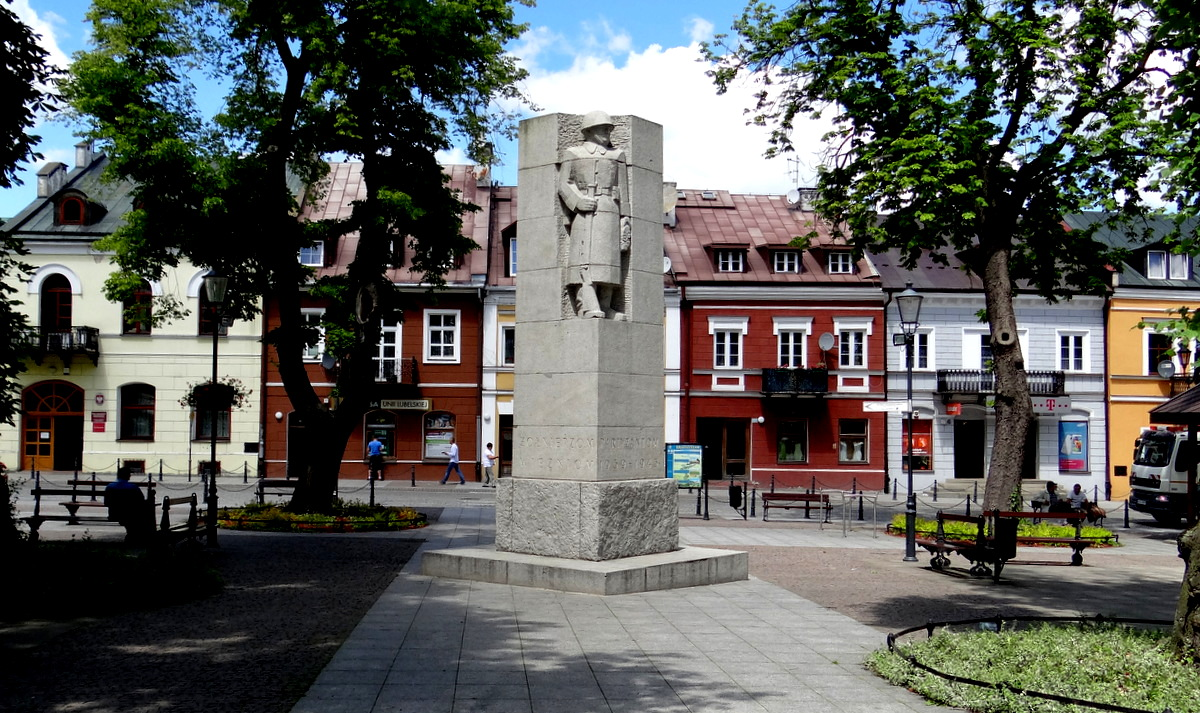
War memorial

Local starost Eugeniusz Olejniczakowski, the commander of the local field hospital, the municipal and county police chiefs and further three local policemen were murdered by the Russians in the Katyn massacre in 1940.

In 1940, the Germans established a Jewish ghetto in the poorest part of town. Over the next few years, Jews from other communities were moved to the ghetto, others moved out of it to other camps and ghettos. Finally, in May 1942, it became a transit ghetto where Jews were brought on their way to Majdanek or to the Sobibor extermination camp, where all were immediately murdered. Later in 1942, some of the remaining Krasnystaw Jews were sent to the Belzec extermination camp. Only a handful of Krasnystaw's Jewish population of about 2500 survived.

In 1943, a local German prison was raided, and 300 inmates were released. In spring 1944, several German trains were destroyed.

=== Post-war period ===
After World War II, anti-Communist units operated here until 1950.

From 1975 to 1998, it was administratively part of the Chełm Voivodeship.

== Distances ==
- Lublin – 55 km (34 mi)
- Chełm – 30 km (19 mi)
- Zamość – 31 km (19 mi)
- Ukraine – 60 km (37 mi)

== Sights ==
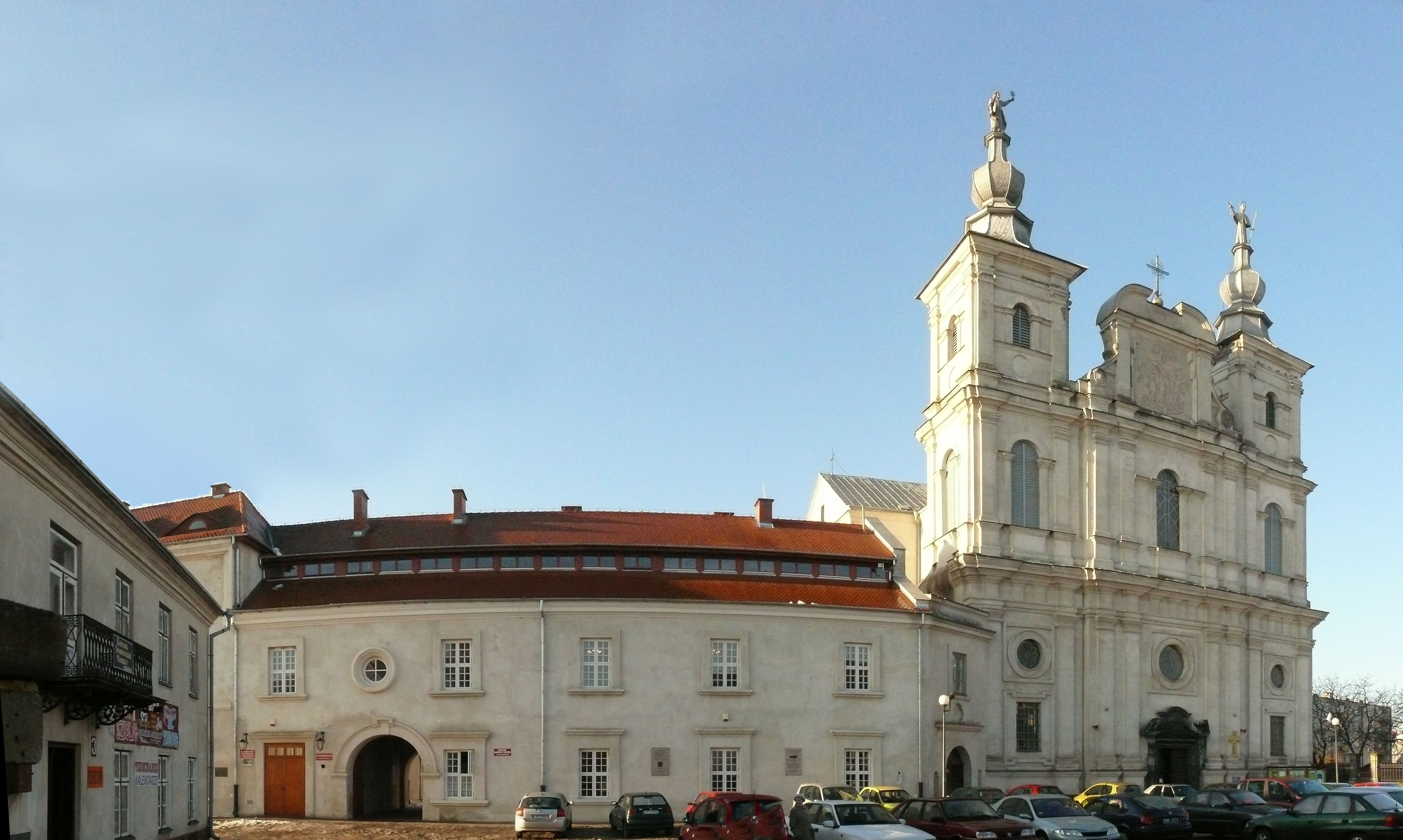
Saint Francis Xavier Church and Jesuit College

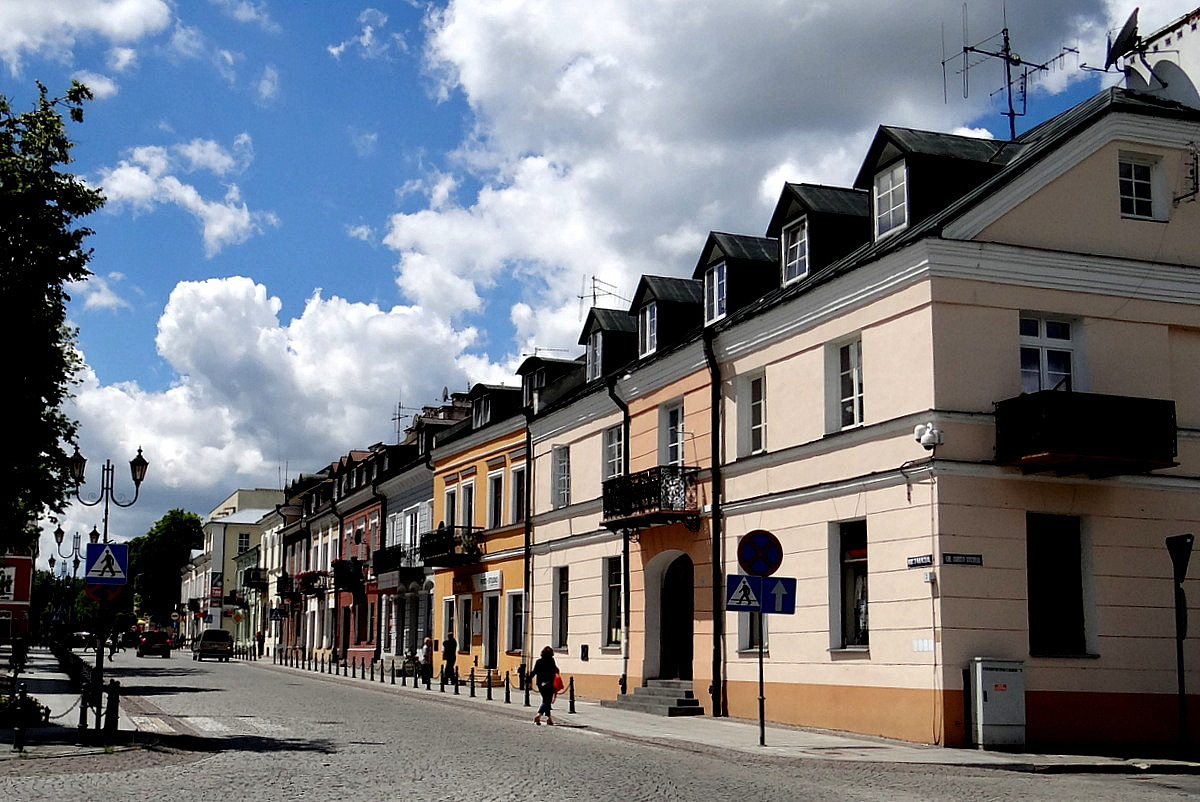
Historic tenements

- Baroque complex of Jesuit Abbey, with a 1720 collegium, and church of Francis Xavier,
- bishophoric palace (early 17th century), founded by Bishop Stanislaw Gamolinski,
- seminary (1719–1739),
- parish church, founded in 1458, destroyed by Crimean Tatars, remodelled in 1826 and 1951.
- archaeological site, located where the 14th century Krasnystaw Castle once stood.
- synagogue and Jewish cemetery,
- 1920s town hall.
- Regional Museum.

== Demographics ==
Historical population

Year	Pop.	±%
1890	7,951	—
1910	8,664	+9.0%
1921	8,943	+3.2%
1931	10,435	+16.7%

Year	Pop.	±%
1939	11,680	+11.9%
1950	9,981	−14.5%
1960	10,971	+9.9%
2010	19,237	+75.3%

== Economy ==
In Krasnystaw the food industry dominates:

- Sugar Factory "Krasnystaw"
- District Dairy Cooperative Krasnystaw
- Fermentation tobacco
- grain elevator Triticarr

== Jewish community ==
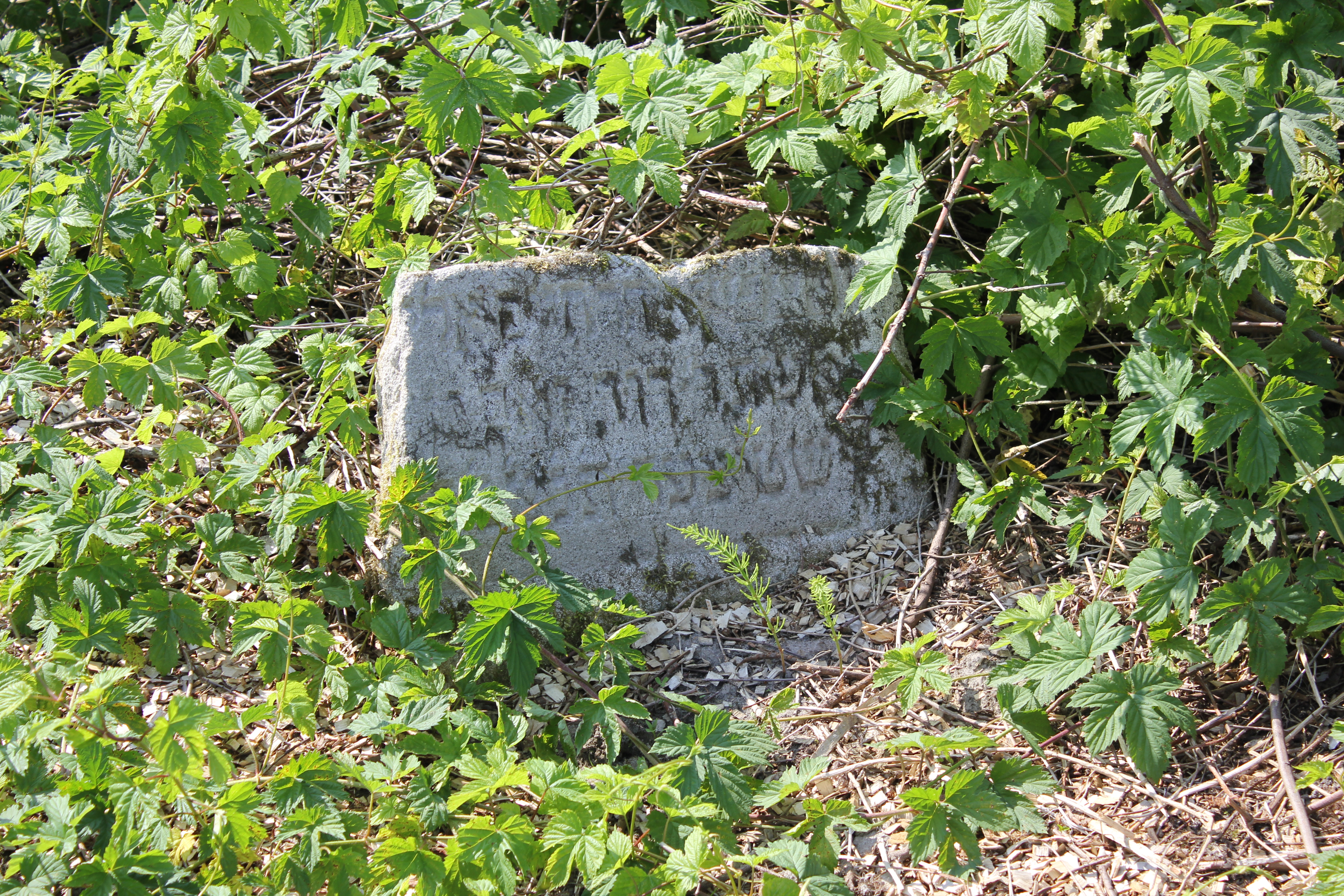
A remaining tombstone at the Jewish Cemetery

The old synagogue of Krasnystaw, which was still standing at the beginning of the 20th century, had a number of 14th- and 15th-century architectural features. The municipal customs records of Krasnystaw for 1548 show a number of Jews resident in the town. In 1554, Jews were prohibited from owning dwelling houses in the town and suburbs, though in 1584 they were allowed to reside in the suburbs only. In 1761, three Jews from Wojslawice and one from Czarnoloz were convicted in a blood libel trial in Krasnystaw; another accused person, the rabbi of Wojslawice, committed suicide in prison. In 1776, the Jewish population of Krasnystaw numbered 63.

In the first half of the 19th century, a bitter struggle emerged between the Jews and the gentile townsfolk, who wished to keep their privilege of not having Jews reside in the town. In 1824, Jews were permitted to reside temporarily in several villages near the town; however, the last restrictions on Jewish residence in Krasnystaw itself were not rescinded until 1862. Eleven Jews resided in the town in 1827. By 1857, the Jewish community had grown to 151 (4% of the population); by 1897, the Jewish community grew to 1,176 (25% of the total). At that time, 80% of local trade was in Jewish hands.

In 1921, the 1,754 Jews constituted 20% of the town's population. After the German murder of almost all the pre-World War II Polish Jews, no Jews currently reside in Krasnystaw.

== Sport ==
Krasnystaw has a 4th league football team called Start Krasnystaw. In 2008 a new stadium/recreation center was built for the team. This new stadium has over 3,000 seats. The recreation center includes an indoor basketball court, a European handball court, gym, volleyball net, and spa.

== Notable people and residents ==
A list of people that were born in the town or that live here.

- Jan Adamiak (born 1948), politician
- Melvin Dresher (1911–1992), mathematician
- Marta Kaczmarek (born 1955), actor
- Avoth Yeshurun aka Yehiel Perlmutter (1904–1992), Hebrew poet
- Szmul Zygielbojm (1895–1943), Bund leader
- Magdalena Wójcik (born 1975), singer
- The American actor Jesse Eisenberg 's family lived in the town prior to World War II. In 2024 he applied for Polish citizenship, reportedly to help "create better relationships between Jews and Polish people."
