= Casanova (rapper) =

American rapper (born 1986)

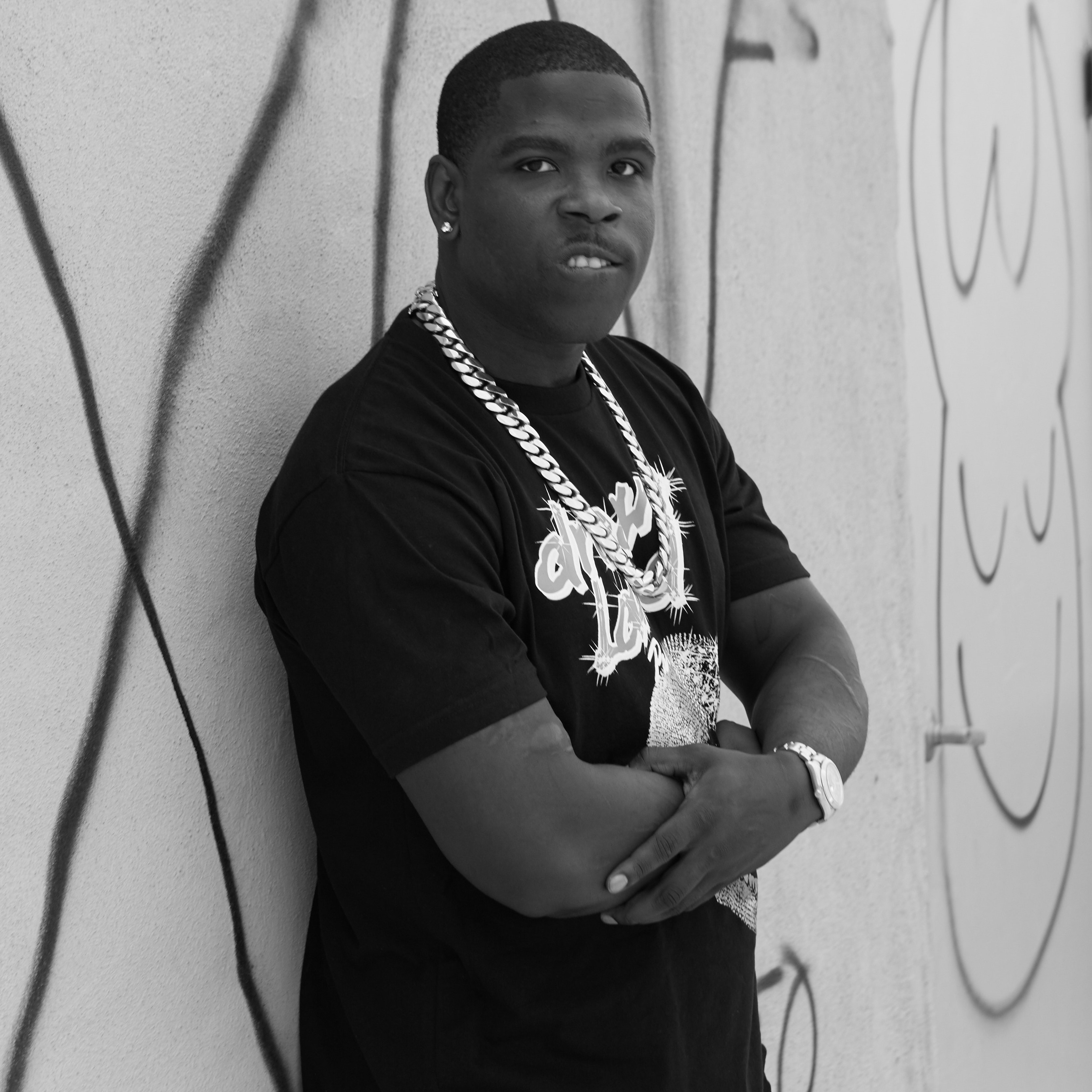
- Casanova in 2016

Background information
- Born: Caswell Senior; October 27, 1986 (age 40); Brooklyn, New York City, U.S.
- Genres: Hip hop; drill; Brooklyn drill
- Occupations: Rapper; songwriter
- Years active: 2016–2020
- Labels: 2x Entertainment; EMPIRE
- Criminal information
- Status: Incarcerated
- Convictions: racketeering; Narcotics Offences
- Penalty: 15 years, 8 months

Details
- Date apprehended: December 2, 2020
- Imprisoned at: Federal Correctional Institution, Fort Dix

Caswell Senior (born October 27, 1986), known professionally as Casanova, is an American rapper from Brooklyn, New York City. In October 2016, following the local success of his debut single "Don't Run", he signed with Memphis Bleek's Warehouse Music Group and Jay-Z's Roc Nation.

In 2020, he was indicted on RICO charges alongside 17 others, due to criminal activities that his Bloods gang "Untouchable Gorilla Stone Nation" allegedly participated in, and sentenced to 15 years.

== Early life ==
Caswell Senior was born and raised in Brooklyn, New York City. He is of Haitian and Panamanian descent. At age 18, he was imprisoned on Rikers Island, where he formed a close bond with his cellmate, who was later discovered to be rapper ASAP Rocky.

== Career ==
While in a studio with friends in early 2016, Casanova, without previous experience, came up with the song "Don't Run", produced by U-Dub of NY Bangers. Upon its release "Don't Run" received heavy radio play from DJ Self on Power 105.1 in New York City, and later also Power 105.1 and Hot 97 there. In June 2016, Casanova released the official video for "Don't Run".

Casanova was discovered by Memphis Bleek through his label, Warehouse Music Group, which is under Jay-Z's record label Roc Nation. In October 2016, Casanova officially signed his deal with Warehouse/Roc Nation. In September 2016, Casanova released the single "Line Me" and a freestyle to Mobb Deep's "Quiet Storm".

In 2017, Casanova released "Don't Run" Remix featuring Young M.A, Fabolous, Dave East and Don Q. He continued to put out music, releasing "The Old 50", followed by his mixtape album "Be Safe Tho" featuring Chris Brown and LO on the song "OHB". On February 8, 2018, Casanova released "Set Trippin" which addressed his beef with fellow New York artist Tekashi69. He performed on the Party Tour with Chris Brown, 50 Cent, French Montana, Fabolous, O.T. Genasis and Kap G. On June 29, 2018, Casanova released his debut EP Commissary with guest appearances from G-Eazy, Rich the Kid, Snap Dogg, A Boogie wit da Hoodie and Mozzy.

== Legal issues ==
On December 1, 2020, prosecutors from the Southern District of New York Federal Court declared a warrant for the arrest of Casanova who they alleged was a leader within the Untouchable Gorilla Stone Nation Gang. He was among 18 alleged members of the Untouchable Gorilla Stone Nation Gang charged in connection with various racketeering, murder, narcotics, firearms and fraud offenses, officials said. The Acting U.S. Attorney Audrey Strauss said: "As alleged in the Indictment, members of Gorilla Stone committed terrible acts of violence, trafficked in narcotics, and even engaged in brazen fraud by exploiting benefits programs meant to provide assistance in response to the COVID-19 pandemic". The FBI apprehended 17 of the gang members, but Casanova was not detained and an arrest warrant was issued for him.

On December 2, 2020, Casanova surrendered to federal authorities. On June 27, 2023, he was sentenced to 188 months (15 years, 8 months) in prison.

== Tour ==
- The Party Tour (2017)

== 2x Entertainment ==
2x Entertainment
- Founded: 2016; 10 years ago
- Founder: Casanova
- Distributor: EMPIRE
- Genre: Hip Hop; R&B
- Country of origin: United States
- Location: New York City, New York

In 2016, Casanova started his own record label called 2x Entertainment. In October 2017, 2x Entertainment's partnership with Warehouse Music Group/Roc Nation was announced by Casanova and Memphis Bleek in an interview with The Breakfast Club on Power 105.1. In November 2017, Casanova signed Lamont Sincere to 2x Entertainment.

=== Artists ===
- Casanova
- Jah Dwella
- Brash
- P Racks
- Lamont Sincere
- Gallardo
- Louski
- Klass Murda

=== Producers ===
- Lamont Sincere

== Discography ==
=== Studio albums ===
Year	Album title	Album details
2019	Behind These Scars	Released: October 11, 2019; Label: 2x Entertainment/Roc Nation; Formats: digital download

=== EPs ===
Year	Album title	Album details
2018	Commissary	Released: June 29, 2018; Label: 2x Entertainment/Roc Nation; Formats: digital download

=== Singles ===
Title	Details
"Don't Run"	Released: March 30, 2016; Label: 2x Entertainment/Warehouse/Roc Nation; Format: Digital download
"Line Me"	Released: September 15, 2016; Label: 2x Entertainment/Warehouse/Roc Nation; Format: Digital download
"Don't Run" Remix (feat. Young M.A, Fabolous, Dave East & Don Q)	Released: February 1, 2017; Label: 2x Entertainment/Warehouse/Roc Nation; Format: Digital download
"The Old 50"	Released: May 19, 2017; Label: 2x Entertainment/Warehouse/Roc Nation; Format: Digital download
"Go Best Friend"	Released: September 8, 2017; Label: 2x Entertainment/Warehouse/Roc Nation; Format: Digital download
"Left, Right" (feat. Chris Brown & Fabolous)	Released: October 27, 2017; Label: 2x Entertainment/Warehouse/Roc Nation; Format: Digital download
"Set Trippin"	Released: February 8, 2018; Label: 2x Entertainment/Roc Nation; Format: Digital download
"Go Bestfriend 2.0" (feat. G-Eazy & Rich The Kid)	Released: May 24, 2018; Label: 2x Entertainment/Roc Nation; Format: Digital download
"2AM" (feat. Tory Lanez & Davido)	Released: January 18, 2019; Label: 2x Entertainment/Roc Nation; Format: Digital download
"So Brooklyn" (feat. Fabolous)	Released: August 16, 2019; Label: 2x Entertainment/Roc Nation; Format: Digital download
"Coming Home" (feat. Chris Brown)	Released: September 5, 2019; Label: 2x Entertainment/Roc Nation; Format: Digital download

=== Mixtapes ===
- "Be Safe Tho" (2017)

=== Guest appearances ===
- Maino (featuring Phresher, Casanova, and Lola Brooke) – "Doing Well" (2017)
- Problem (featuring 1TakeJay, Casanova, and Saviii 3rd) – "F*ck Me Too" (2018)
- Papoose (featuring Casanova) – "Shooter" (2018)
- DJ Premier (featuring Casanova) – "Wut U Said?" (2018)
- 50 Cent (featuring Casanova, Uncle Murda, 6ix9ine) "Get The Strap" (2018)
