= Skrzydlata Polska =

Polish periodical

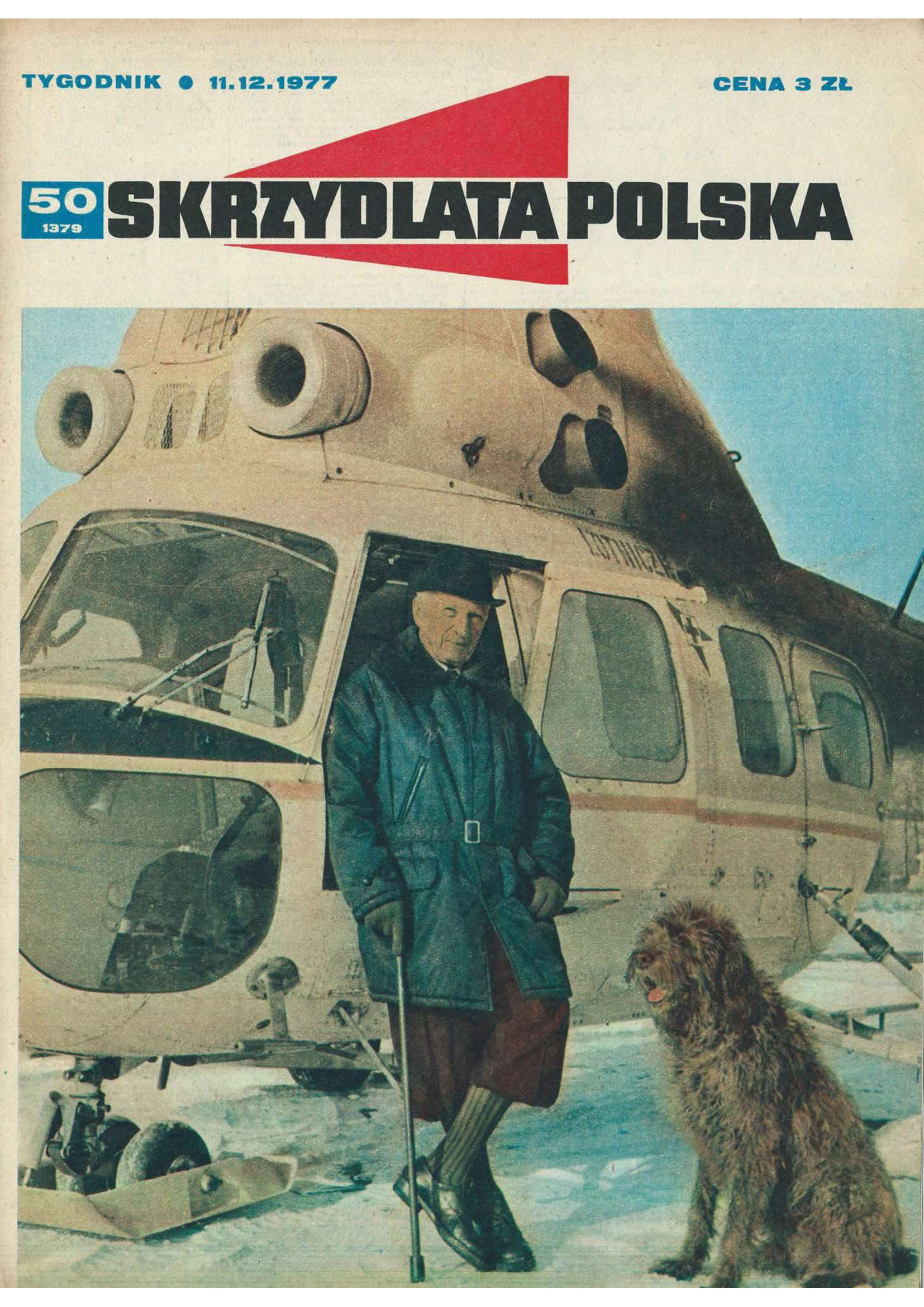
- Cover of Skrzydlata Polska featuring Polish aviator Michał Scipio del Campo, 11 December 1977
- Editor: Bartosz Głowacki
- Former editors: Jerzy Osiński
- Founder: Jerzy Osiński
- First issue: July 10, 1930; 94 years ago
- Company: Polish Aero Club, Agencja Lotnicza ALTAIR
- Country: Second Polish Republic, Polish People's Republic, Poland
- Based in: Warsaw
- Language: Polish
- ISSN: 0137-866X

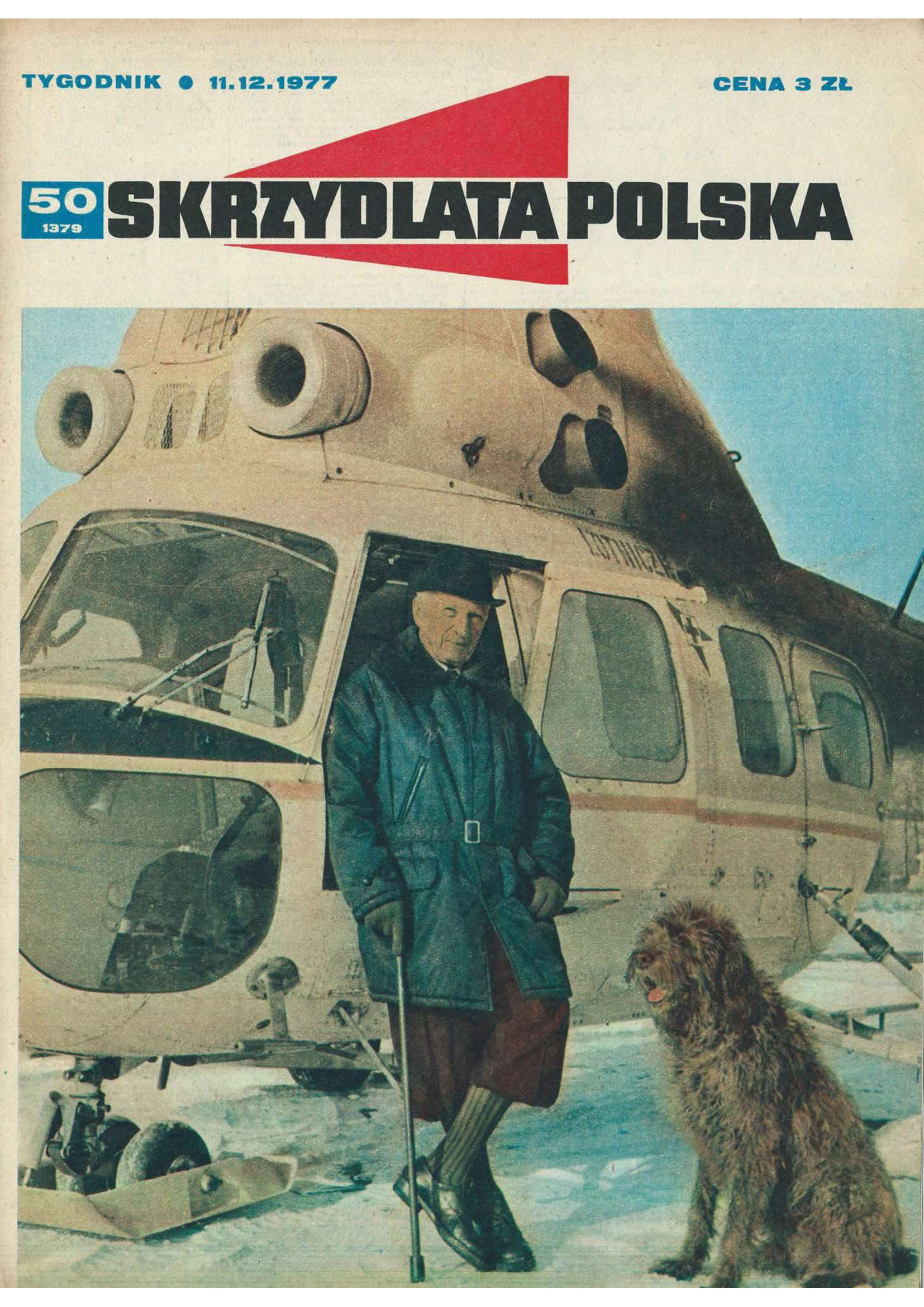
Issue of Skrzydlatej Polski from 1977 with Michał Scipio del Campo on the cover

Skrzydlata Polska is a Polish aeronautics magazine, published since 1930. It is the oldest journal on the subject of aviation in Poland.

The magazine is important is covering civilian and military problems in aviation and developments. It also has much current information on all types of shows and displays.
