= Smolarek =

Smolarek is a Polish surname. Notable people with the surname include:

- Dariusz Smolarek (born 1960), Polish musicologist
- Ebi Smolarek (born 1981, Łódź), Polish football player
- Joanna Smolarek (born 1952), Polish track and field sprinter
- Ryszard Smolarek (born 1952), Polish politician
- Waldemar Smolarek (1937–2010), artist painter
- Włodzimierz Smolarek (1957–2012), Polish football player
- Zbigniew Smolarek (born 1946), Polish military man
- Zenon Smolarek (born 1938), Polish officer

== See also ==
- Smolar
