= ASAP TyY =

American rapper (born 1990)

A$AP TyY
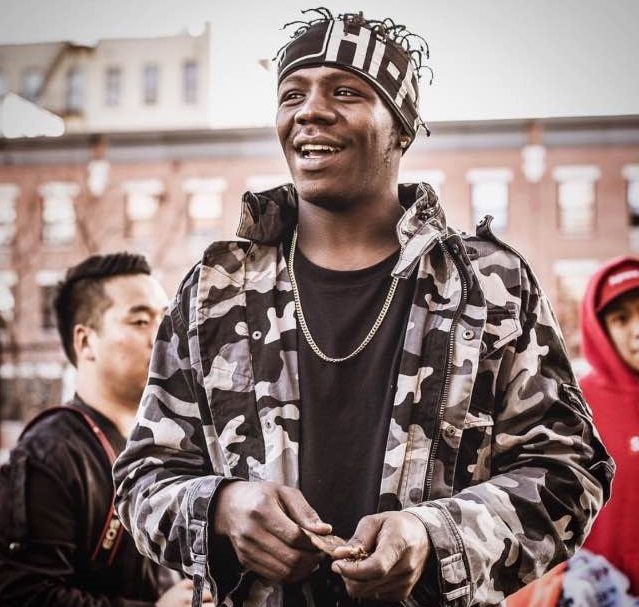
- A$AP TyY in 2017

Background information
- Also known as: A$AP TyY
- Born: Tyrone S. Walker; May 21, 1990 (age 35); Manhattan, New York City, U.S.
- Genres: Hip hop
- Occupations: Rapper; songwriter; fashion designer; record producer
- Member of: ASAP Mob
- Website: www.asaptyy.com

Tyrone S. Walker (born May 21, 1990), known by his stage name ASAP TyY (stylized as A$AP TyY), is an American rapper from the Harlem neighborhood of Manhattan, New York City. He joined hip hop collective ASAP Mob in 2014, from which he adopted his "A$AP" moniker.

He is known for his 2015 singles "O Well" and "Chamber Lock" (featuring A$AP Yams), as well as his 2016 single "Remain the Same". His debut mixtape, BEST KEPT SECRET (2016) contained 19 tracks and was released as a free download. Following the 2016 United States Presidential election debates, he released the single "Trump", a diss song aimed at the election's winner.

In addition to music, Walker has also taken part in fashion, art, and street culture. An avid dirt bike fanatic, Walker popularized the Bike Life subculture of New York City. Utilizing his platform as both a recording artist and dirt bike rider, Walker released his first art exhibit in 2014, as well as two signature ski-goggles.

== Musical career ==
=== 2012–2014: Beginnings & A$AP Mob ===
By early 2012, TyY had garnered recognition as a biker on the streets of Harlem. Utilizing his newfound platform, TyY would release his first track, a collaboration between himself and Young Money Yawn entitled "Comme Des Fawk Down", in early 2014.

=== 2015–2016: Best Kept Secret ===
Though he had created a following for himself prior to becoming a rapper, it was not until 2015 when TyY's rapping career truly began. In early 2015, TyY released the track "Chamber Lock", which included an intro from his friend, deceased A$AP Mob founder, A$AP Yams. After "Chamber Lock", TyY went on to create his next single, "O Well" on June 2, 2015, before dropping "Remain the Same" in February 2016. All three tracks would appear on TyY's debut mixtape, BEST KEPT SECRET, which dropped on April 13, 2016.

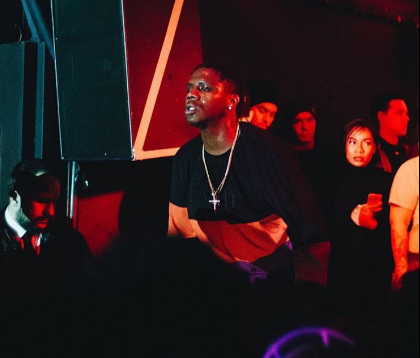
A$AP TyY performing during his headline European tour at The Old Blue Last in London, UK.

=== 2016–2017: European tour ===
After the premiere of his debut mixtape, TyY would release three singles; "Bust It Open" on September 21, "Trump" on November 7, and the collaboration between himself & BewhY, "Like Me" on December 28. In early 2017, capitalizing on the success of his most recent projects, TyY would embark on his first headline tour; a 5-day, 3 country, tour taking place in Paris, Amsterdam, and London.

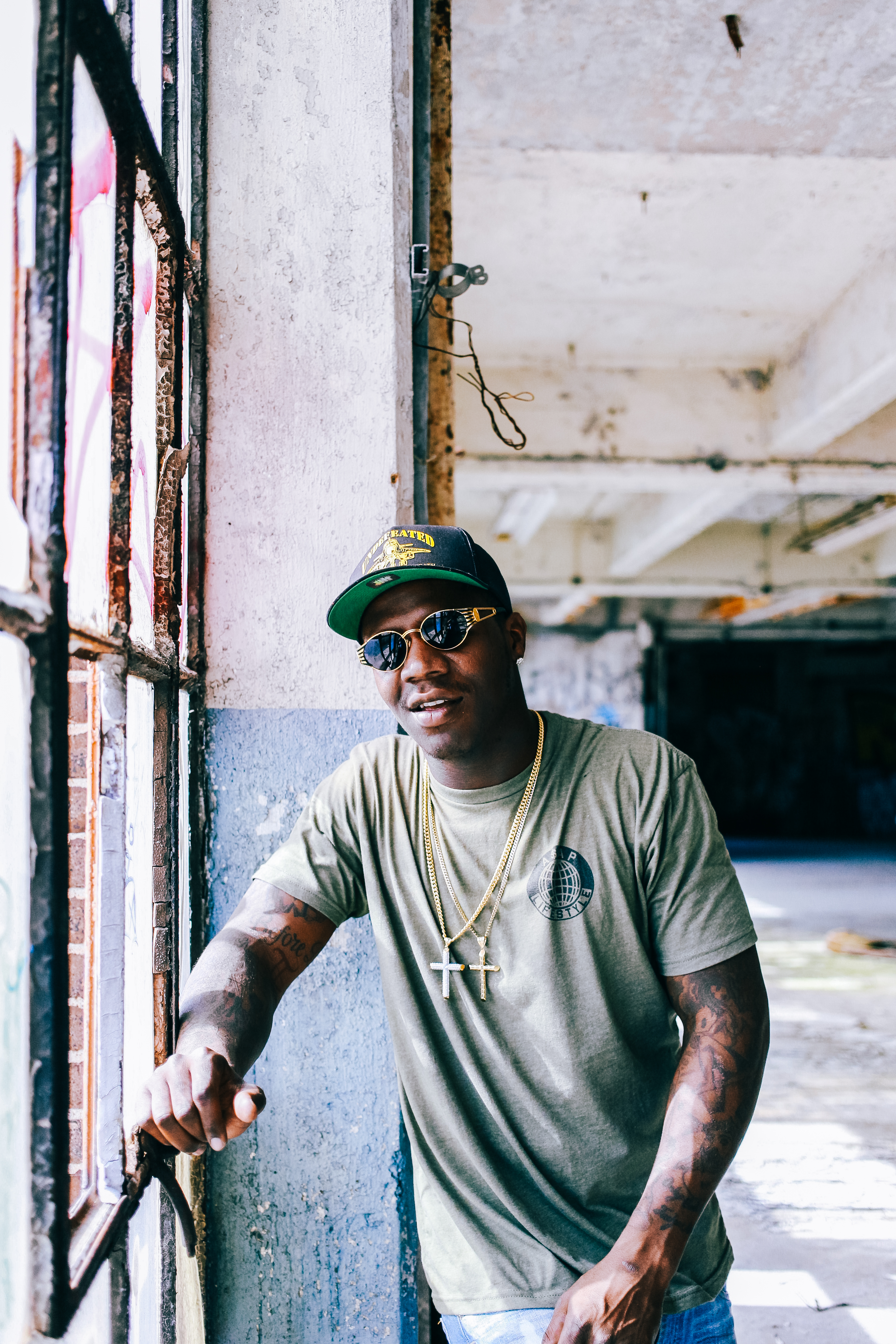
ASAP TyY from the ASAP Mob in 2016.

=== Cozy Tapes Vol. 2: Too Cozy ===
On August 25, 2017, ASAP Mob released its second studio album, Cozy Tapes Vol. 2: Too Cozy. The album was released by ASAP Worldwide, Polo Grounds Music, and RCA Records.

TyY would be featured on the 8th track, titled "Get the Bag." The track also featured ASAP Rocky, ASAP Ferg, ASAP Ant, ASAP Nast, Playboi Carti and Smooky Margielaa.

=== Troubles of the World ===
On April 19, 2018, TyY released his first mixtape/album, Troubles of The World. The songs featured OG Maco, Lamont Sincere, A$AP Ant and Macca Wiles.

== Non-music ventures ==
=== Fashion ===
On December 16, 2016, TyY partnered with Brooklyn-based designer, KidSuper, to create a pair of dual-branded ski-goggles; with the ASAP Mob and KidSuper logos being featured on each side of the piece. The goggles were inspired by Bike Life's signature look of wearing them while riding his ATV through the streets of New York City.

In the summer of 2017, TyY would launch multiple collections with a variety of brands. Most notably, during Paris Fashion Week, TyY partnered with Milan-based designer, Guntas. The line was a marquee feature of Guntas' Spring 2018 collection.

=== Bike Life ===
TyY is known for popularizing and leading the subculture of Bike Life, a Harlem counter-culture known for their love of ATV's, dirt bikes and riding them on the streets of New York. The NYPD has expressed disapproval, as the vehicles are not street legal. The group still continues to ride to this day.

== Discography ==
=== Mixtapes ===
Title	Album details
Best Kept Secret	Released: April 16, 2016; Label: Self-released; Formats: Digital download
Troubles of the World	Released: April 19, 2018; Label: Self-released; Formats: Digital download
Project Rockstar	Released: March 1, 2019; Label: Self-released; Formats: Digital download

=== Singles ===
Title	Date Released	Album
"Chamber Lock" (featuring ASAP Yams)	February 2, 2015	Best Kept Secret
"OWell"	June 2, 2015	Best Kept Secret
"Remain the Same"	February 2, 2016	Best Kept Secret
"Bust It Open"	September 21, 2016	non-album singles
"Trump"	November 7, 2016	non-album singles
"Like Me" (featuring BewhY and C Jamm)	December 28, 2016	non-album singles
"Hit the Top"	February 28, 2018	Troubles of the World

=== Guest appearances ===
Title	Release date	Album
"Surrounded by Girls" (Lamont Sincere featuring A$AP TyY)	May 23, 2017	non-album single
"Get the Bag" (ASAP Mob featuring ASAP Rocky, Smooky MarGielaa, Playboi Carti, ASAP Ferg, ASAP TyY, ASAP Nast & ASAP Ant)	August 25, 2017	Cozy Tapes Vol. 2: Too Cozy

=== Music videos ===
Track	Release date	Director
"Chamber Lock" featuring ASAP Yams)	February 26, 2015	Elmino DaGreat
"Remain the Same"	May 5, 2015	Hyper View Films
"OWell"	November 1, 2015	Axiöm
"New York State of Mind"	August 10, 2016	Antoine Duchamp
"Loose Change"	October 26, 2016	A$AP TyY
"Tonite"	January 11, 2017	Royal Rel
