= Lamont Sincere =

American musical artist (born 1989)

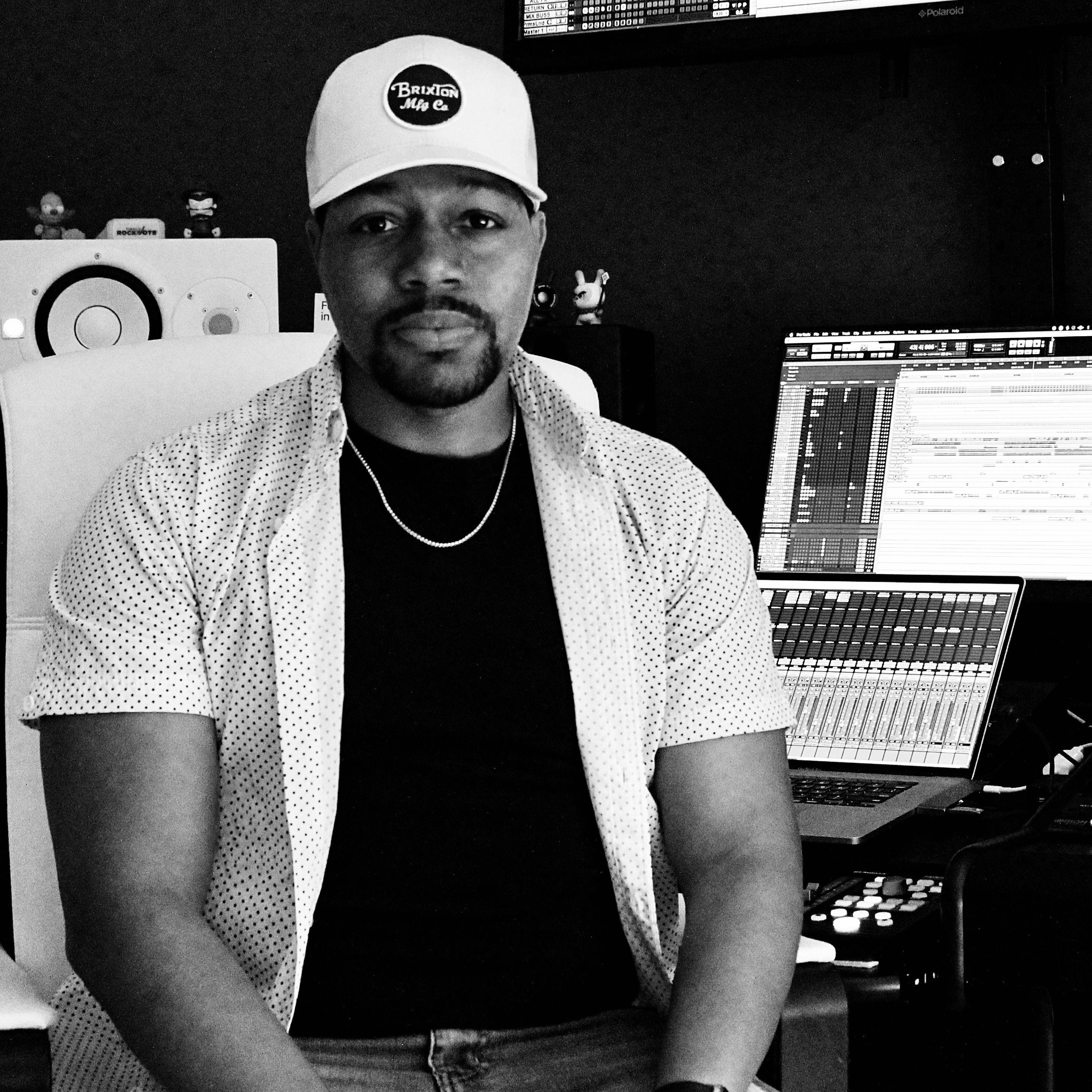

Background information
- Born: Albert Lamont Brown; May 3, 1989 (age 37); Brooklyn, New York, US
- Genres: R&B; pop
- Occupations: Mixing engineer; singer; songwriter; producer
- Years active: 2008–present
- Labels: 2x Entertainment; Empire
- Website: beaudiomixing.com

Albert Lamont Brown (born May 3, 1989) formerly known as Lamont Sincere is an American mixing engineer, singer, songwriter and record producer from Brooklyn, New York. He gained credibility for his single "Huge Flirt" featuring Bagstheboss and collaborated with the Harlem native ASAP Mob member ASAP TyY for "Surrounded by Girls". He is currently under 2x Entertainment, founded by rapper Casanova. He is known for mixing records for Motown Records artist Cam Wallace and featured artist Wiz Khalifa.

== Biography ==
=== Early life ===
Lamont Sincere was raised in the middle of Brownsville and Crown Heights from his toddler to his teenage years. In 2008, he was featured as the artist name Sincere for his song "What I Been Waiting For" on concreteloop.com.

=== Singing career ===
Lamont Sincere music mentor was Doug E Fresh. His music production was featured during the nominations in the 2014 Soul Train Music Awards. He released his first single "Above & Beyond" in 2015 which landed his music video to be on MTV Sincere released "Huge Flirt" featuring Bagstheboss, in 2016 premiering on Hot 97 and Hot 93.7 radio. In 2017, he released another single called "Surrounded by Girls" featuring ASAP TyY from the ASAP Mob, continuously being play on Hot 93.7 in Hartford, CT. Sincere got signed to Empire by A&R Bobby Fisher and founder & CEO Ghazi Shami. He releases a double single "Where It Came From" and "Broken". In November, he became an artist under Casanova 2x Entertainment, a partnership under Warehouse Music Group / Roc Nation.

=== Mixing career ===
From 2015, Lamont has been best known as a singer, songwriter, record producer; however, he has mixed his song and other receiving no credit. He now considers himself as a "mix engineer".

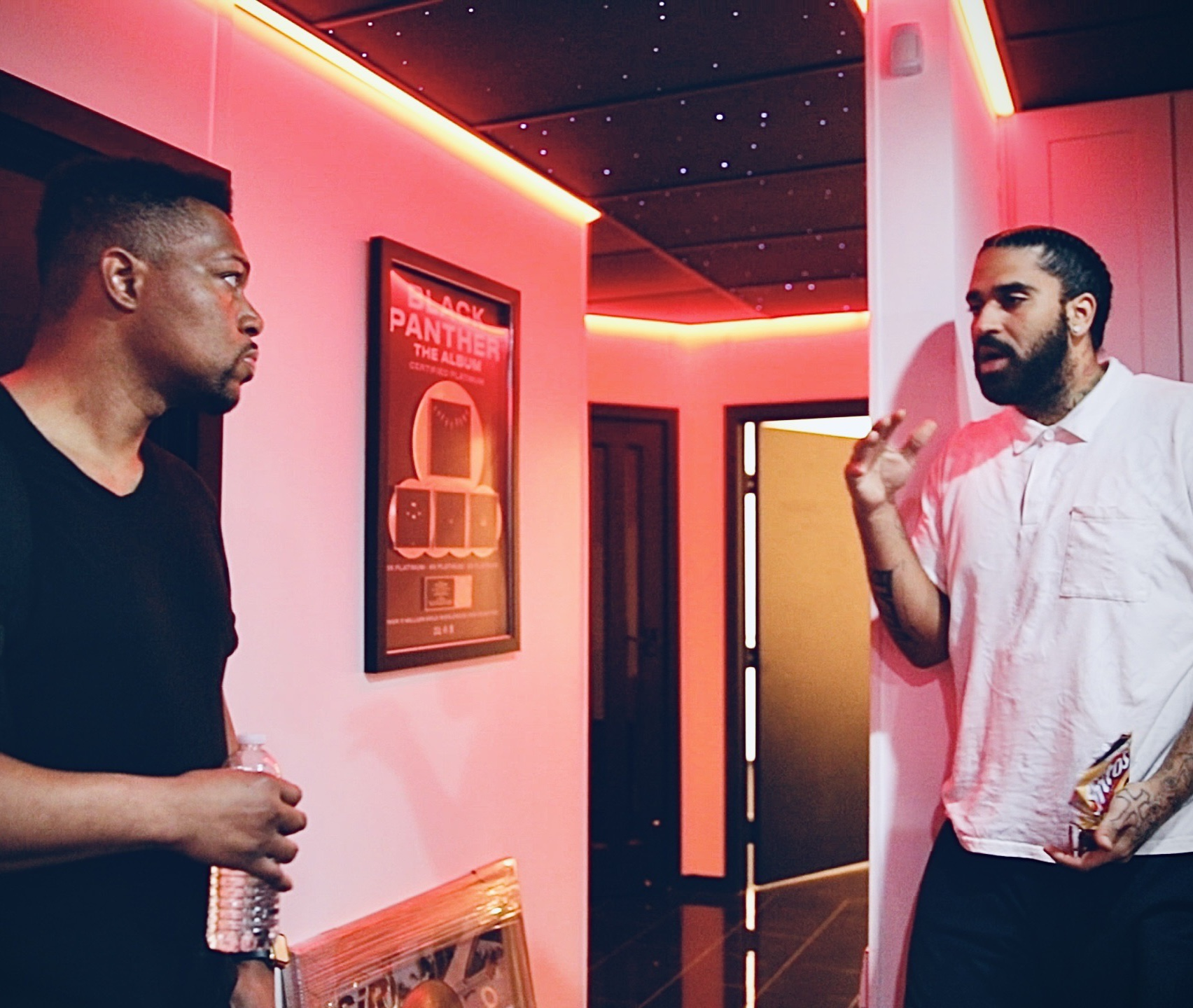
Lamont Sincere (left) and MixedByAli meeting at EngineEars

In 2021, Lamont has established his mixing career with formal education from Full Sail University leading him to become a mix engineer for BE Audio Mixing and selected by MixedByAli to be a mix engineer under his company EngineEars. He gained the opportunity with the help of his manager Ethelie Evelyn to work with Shawn Barron (Vice President of Motown Records) to mix songs for Cam Wallace reaching 1 million views on Spotify for mixing Retail Remix featuring Wiz Khalifa.

=== Musical style and influences ===
Lamont Sincere has a new age R&B and pop combined sound as a singer. He has had songs played on internet and mainstream radio. Sincere is influenced by his father who was a guitar player, vocalist and musical artists such as Marvin Gaye, Raphael Saadiq, Usher, 112 and The Temptations. Being a mix engineer he has been influenced from the teachings of Dave Pensado, Jaycen Joshua, Leslie Brathwaite, Josh Gudwin and MixedByAli.

== Selected discography (as a singer) ==
=== EPs ===
Year	Album title	Album details
2018	Mixed Emotions	Released: August 31, 2018; Label: 2x Entertainment; Formats: digital download

=== Singles ===
Title	Details
"Above & Beyond"	Released: September 22, 2015; Label: Self-released; Format: digital download
"8:08"	Released: December 18, 2015; Label: Self-released; Format:digital download
"Huge Flirt" (feat. Bagstheboss)	Released: August 19, 2016; Label: Self-released; Format: digital download
"2MUH"	Released: January 27, 2017; Label: Self-released; Format: digital download
"Surrounded by Girls" (feat. ASAP TyY)	Released: September 8, 2017; Label: Self-released; Format: digital download
"Where It Came From"	Released: August 18, 2017; Label: 2x Entertainment; Format: digital download
"Broken"	Released: August 18, 2017; Label: 2x Entertainment; Format: digital download
"Rough Ting" (feat. Nyzzy Nyce)	Released: August 3, 2018; Label: 2x Entertainment; Format: digital download

=== Guest appearances ===
- ASAP TyY (featuring Lamont Sincere) – "Sunshine" (2018)
- 3AMParadise (featuring O'Ryan, Swang and Lamont Sincere) – Red Maserati (2018)

=== Production credits ===
- Soul Train Music Awards (2014)
- ASAP TyY (featuring Lamont Sincere) – "Sunshine" (2016) (co-prod Tyler Mora)

== Selected discography (as mix engineer) ==
- Cam Wallace – "We Made It" (2021)
- Cam Wallace – "Retail (Remix) Wiz Khalifa (2021)
- Cam Wallace – "These Perfect Moments" EP (2021)
