= Smoler =

Smoler is a surname. Notable people with the surname include:

- Harry Smoler (1911–1991), American politician
- Jan Arnošt Smoler (1816–1884), Sorbian philologist and writer
- Eliezer Smoler (1901–1985), Israeli writer

== See also ==
- Smolar
