= Smolarz =

Smolarz may refer to:

- Smolarz, Lubusz Voivodeship, a village in western Poland
- Henryk Smolarz (born 1969), a Polish politician

== See also ==
- Smolarze
- Smolarek
