= Elżbieta Adamiak =

Polish Catholic theologian and professor

- Born: 7 October 1964 (age 61); Poznań, Poland

Elżbieta Adamiak (born 7 October 1964) is a Polish Catholic theologian. Since 2016, she has been Professor of Fundamental Theology and Dogmatics at the Institute for Catholic Theology at the University of Koblenz-Landau.
