= Tadeusz Sławecki =

Polish politician

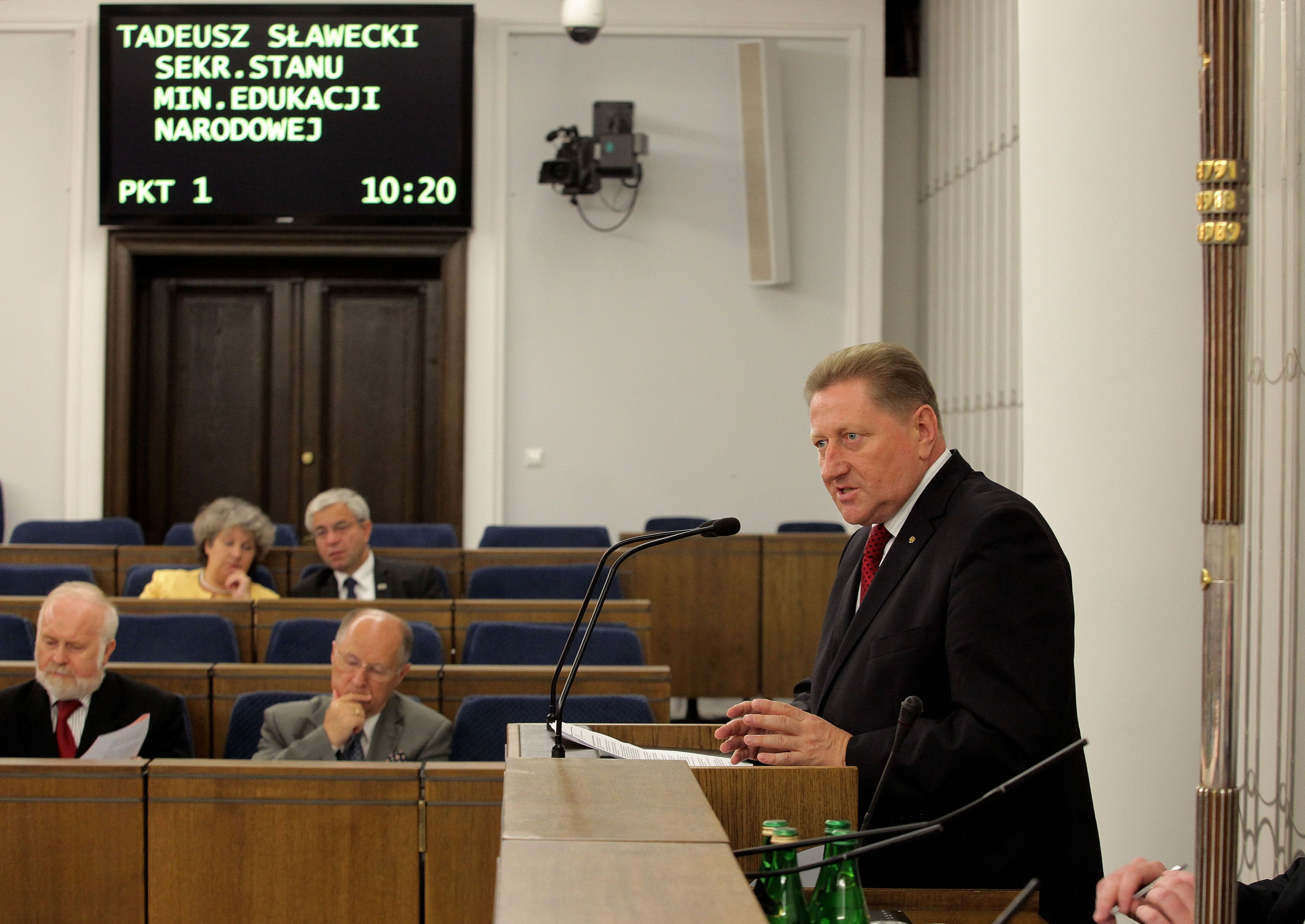

Member of Sejm 2005-2007
- In office 25 September 2005 – ?

Personal details
- Born: 27 August 1957 (age 68)
- Party: Polish People's Party

Tadeusz Sławecki (born 27 August 1957 in Czemierniki) is a Polish politician. He was elected to the Sejm on 25 September 2005, getting 6879 votes in 7 Chełm district as a candidate from the Polish People's Party list.

He was also a member of Sejm 1993-1997.

== See also ==
- Members of Polish Sejm 2005-2007
