= Blutonium Boy =

German record producer and DJ

Dirk Adamiak (born 1970), better known by his stage name Blutonium Boy, is a hardstyle producer and DJ from Germany. He started playing as a DJ in 1988.

== Career ==
In 1986, Blutonium Boy began his DJ career in a small club in southern Germany. In 1988, he quit his job to concentrate on his music more freely and within a year he played in front of 2,500 visitors and started to receive booking requests from abroad. In 1997, he founded the record label Blutonium Records, where he released his first work Dreams in my Fantasy, as DJ Session One. Worldwide marketing via EastWest (Warner) with airplay on Viva helped him to reach the breakthrough.

In the following years, Blutonium Records developed into the Blutonium Media Germany Group, which has now published more than 170 works with several sub-labels and operates a social network for musicians under the name Blupile.

In November 2008, EMI Germany released a best-of-hardstyle series, which includes four mixed CDs from the repertoire of Blutonium Records. In collaboration with EMI, a series of hardstyle compilations under the name Blutonium Presents Hardstyle was released in Germany and Australia.

Blutonium Boy announced that his career as a hardstyle DJ temporarily paused in the summer of 2009. However, as of July 17, 2012, Blutonium Boy has officially returned. He announced this by releasing the single Hardstyle Instructor is back. He was also responsible for the compilation Hardstyle 10 Years released on November 23. In 2013 the compilation series Hardstyle with Hardstyle Vol 26, which had been picked up by Showtek, was returned to Blutonium Boy.

On June 21, 2013, Blutonium Boy played in EDC (Las Vegas) on the BassCon stage

== Blutonium Records ==
Adamiak founded Blutonium Records in 1996, which up to 2011 produced 160 releases. Blutonium Records later became a division of Blutonium Media Germany, with 6 sublabels. The sublabels are Blutonium Traxx, Dance 2 Trance, Pumping Trance, Q-Asar, Trianon Records and BAM Recordings. Since Blutonium Records isn't producing trance anymore, but hardstyle, the production of trance is in the hands of the sublabels. In December 2005 Blutonium Records released its 100th vinyl.

== Discography ==
=== Albums ===
- Hardstyle Dimension
- Essential Of Hardstyle Vol. 1-5
- Essential Of Hardstyle Vol. 6
- Early Hardstyle 100 Vol. 1
- Hardstyle Is My Life

=== Singles and EPs ===
- Brainshooter
- Trancin Your Mind
- Higher Level (feat. DJ Neo)
- Go Burn A Fatty Ass (feat. Thomas Trouble)
- Make It Loud
- Hardstyle Nation (feat. DJ Neo)
- Hardstyle Instructor
- Paranoid (feat. DJ Virus)
- Follow Me
- Hardstyle Instructor Part 2
- Hard Creation (feat. DJ Virus)
- Floorkilla (feat. DJ Pavo)
- Bullshit (feat. Max B. Grant)
- Legalize (feat. John Ferris)
- Make It Louder
- Alarma (feat. Thomas Trouble)
- Acid & Bass
- Hardstyle And Acid (feat. John Ferris)
- Hardstyle Rockers / Supreme (feat. DJ Pila)
- Inferno / To The Bassline (feat. Romeo Must Die)
- This Is My Floor (feat. DJ Pavo)
- Acid Over Sydney / Back
- In Touch With Tomorrow / Kick This M.F.
- Dark Angel (Remix EP)
- Dark Angel / Hardstyle Instructor Returns
- Blackout / Fear (feat. Luna)
- Use Me / XTC
- Hardstyle Superstar / eBeat
- Sound Like This / Euphobia
- Play This Song PTS
- Echoes 2009 (feat. Pavo)
- All Your Bass 2010 (feat. Flarup)
- USMHF
- Make It Loud 2012 (incl. Headhunterz Remix)
- New York New York / Survivor
- US Hardstyle MF**
- Hardstyle Instructur Is Back
- Holding Out For A Hero (feat. Bonnie Tyler)
- Dancing For Love
- I AM (feat. Raw Editors & Audionator)
- Reverze Bass
- Spooky Melo
- Where Did I Go (feat. Eric Bazilian)
- Dancing For The Love (feat. Eric Bazilian)
- Hard Sound (feat. Daniele Mondello)
- Hard As Hell (feat. Daniele Mondello)
- Believe In Me (feat. Bonnie Tyler)
- Everything (feat. Haddaway)
- Wild Wild Baby (feat. Haddaway)
- Sentenced
- Rock The Dolls
- Echoes 2K14 (feat. Eric Bazilian)
- Drop That Shit
- Fantasize
- Turn On The Radio (feat. Express Viviana)
- Who Is It (feat. Psytrex DJ)
- Explosion
- Hardstyle MC (feat. Danielle Mondello)
- Hardstyle & Acid Rekick (feat. Audionator)
- Brainshooter 3000
- Turn Up The Bass (EDM/Bigroom)
- Superchords
- U Got 2 Let The Bass Kick
- Holding Out For A Hero 2K15 (feat. Bonnie Tyler & Van Snyder)
- Breaking Up (feat. Chris Crusher)
- Can You Hear Me?
- Twisted (feat. Van Snyder) (EDM/Bigroom)
- Just Boof It
- Dirty Drop (EDM/Bigroom)
- Your Time (EDM/Bigroom)

=== Compilations ===
- Blutonium pres. Hardstyle Vol. 1-2
- Blutonium pres. Hardstyle Vol. 3-4
- Blutonium pres. Hardstyle Vol. 5-7
- Blutonium pres. Hardstyle Vol. 8-10
- Blutonium pres. Hardstyle Vol. 11-13
- Blutonium pres. Hardstyle Vol. 14-15
- Blutonium pres. Hardstyle Vol. 16-18
- Blutonium & DMW pres. Hardstyle Vol. 19-21
- Blutonium & DMW pres. Hardstyle Vol. 22-24
- Blutonium & DMW pres. Hardstyle Vol. 25
- Blutonium & DMW pres. 10 Years Hardstyle
- Blutonium pres. Hardstyle Vol. 26
- Blutonium pres. Hardstyle Vol. 27

=== Blutonium Boy Remixes ===
- Yoji Biomehanika - Monochroma (Blutonium Boy Remix)
- Mo-Do - Eins Zwei Polizei (Blutonium Boy Remix)
- Raveboy - Dancing Through The Night (Blutonium Boy Remix)
- Audionator - The Devil Inside (Blutonium Boy Remix)
- Headhunterz and Crystal Lake - Live Your Life (Blutonium Boy Remix)
- Van Snyder - Athens (Blutonium Boy Remix)
