= Jerzy Osiński =

Polish aviator and magazine publisher

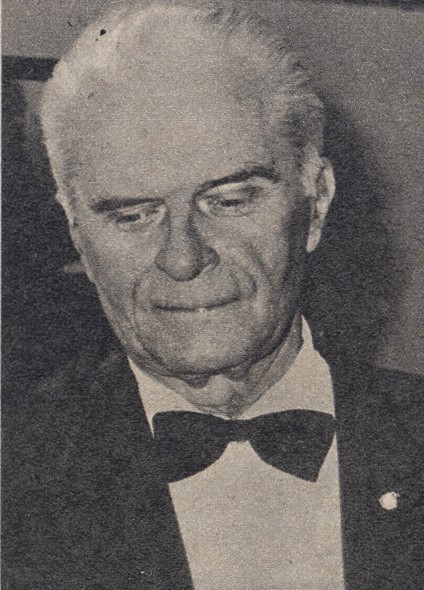
- Born: 15 February 1906; Warsaw
- Died: 1 October 1982 (aged 76); Warsaw

Jerzy Jan Osiński (15 February 1906 – 1 October 1982) was a Polish aviator, magazine publisher and promoter of recreational aviation.

== Early life and education ==
Osiński was born in Warsaw, Poland. His parents were Jan Osiński and Maria Osińska (family name Maruszewska).

During high school, he founded the Sermonia literary club and joined the Polski Lotniczy Związek Młodzieży ("Polish Youth Aviation Association"). He studied law at the Warsaw University.

== Career ==
As a young man, Osiński was involved in competitive aviation. In 1931 and 1933 he competed in the Lublin-Podlasie Winter Air Races as a navigator. In 1936 he won the J. Keilowa balloon competition. On September 2, 1938, Osiński joined the International Aeronautical Federation (Fédération Aéronautique Internationale) (patent no. 58).

Osiński founded the Młody Lotnik (Young Aviator) magazine whose first issue was published on 5 October 1924. After 10 July 1930, the magazine changed its name to Skrzydlata Polska (Winged Poland), and was issued until the outbreak of World War II. Młody Lotnik was a popular magazine about flying while Skrzydlata Polska was more technical, and included reviews of international press about aviation. J. Osiński was the publisher of Skrzydlata Polska between July 1934 and September 1939 (because of the war the September issue was not published and was destroyed).

During the war, J. Osiński fled via Zaleszczyki and Romania to Turkey. In Turkey, he became a manager of economic affairs of a factory producing aviation equipment and fighting planes for the Allies.

After the war, Osiński worked in the LOT Polish Airlines. In 1953, he was dismissed for political reasons: he never joined the Polish United Workers' Party. He could not find another job in his profession in a state enterprise due to the employment policy of that time, and he worked in Kazimierz Tukan co-operative.

In 1956, after the political thaw (Gomulka Thaw), he was offered employment in LOT and in the Aviation Department of the Ministry of Communication. He became the department director but, being nonpartisan, he remained a low-level employee. Highly knowledgeable on the issues of aviation and air transport, he participated in preparing Polish documentation and the guidelines of development in the ministry, and was responsible for international contacts within the Council for Mutual Economic Aid (Comecon).

Osiński was a member and supporter of the Solidarity movement. During the Martial law in Poland in 1981, he refused to sign the “lojalka”, formally the "declaration of loyalty", about refraining from any actions against the contemporary state administration, and was subsequently dismissed again. At this point in his life he started suffering from cancer.

== Retirement ==
After retirement, he continued to work as a consultant in the Ministry department dealing with international relations, and economical issues. Also, he was once more an editor of Skrzydlata Polska, where he regularly published reviews of international press about aviation. Osiński was an active member of the Aviation Seniors' Club and the Warsaw Aviation Club ("Aeroklub Warszawski").

He was the author of the Aviation Transport handbook.

Osiński was married to Zofia Osińska (family name Melcer). He had one daughter Elżbieta (at present Elżbieta Dryll). He died of cancer in Warsaw in 1982.
