= Krystyna Ozga =

Polish politician (born 1944)

member of Sejm 2005-2007
- In office 25 September 2005 – ?

Personal details
- Born: 20 June 1944 (age 81)
- Party: Polish People's Party

Krystyna Ewa Ozga (born 20 June 1944 in Częstochowa) is a Polish politician. She was elected to Sejm on 25 September 2005, getting 8250 votes in 10 Piotrków Trybunalski district as a candidate from the Polish People's Party list.

She was also a member of Sejm 1993-1997 and Sejm 2001-2005.

== See also ==
- Members of Polish Sejm 2005-2007
