= Romuald Jankowski =

Polish politician (1934–1994)

- Born: 19 February 1934; Lutsk, Wołyń Voivodeship, Poland
- Died: 12 February 1994 (aged 59); Warsaw, Poland
- Occupation: Politician
- Political party: Polish People's Party

Romuald Jankowski (19 February 1934 – 12 February 1994) was a Polish politician from the Polish People's Party. He served as member of the Senate from 14 October 1993 until almost one month after his death, 10 March 1994.
