= Jan Andrykiewicz =

Polish politician

- Born: 14 June 1953 (age 72); Zielona Góra, Lubusz Voivodeship, Poland
- Occupation: Politician
- Political party: Polish People's Party

Jan Tadeusz Andrykiewicz (born 14 June 1953) is a Polish farmer and politician from the Polish People's Party. He served as member of the Sejm from 1993 to 1997 and was a candidate for the European Parliament in 2004.
