= Mirosław Maliszewski =

Polish politician (born 1968)

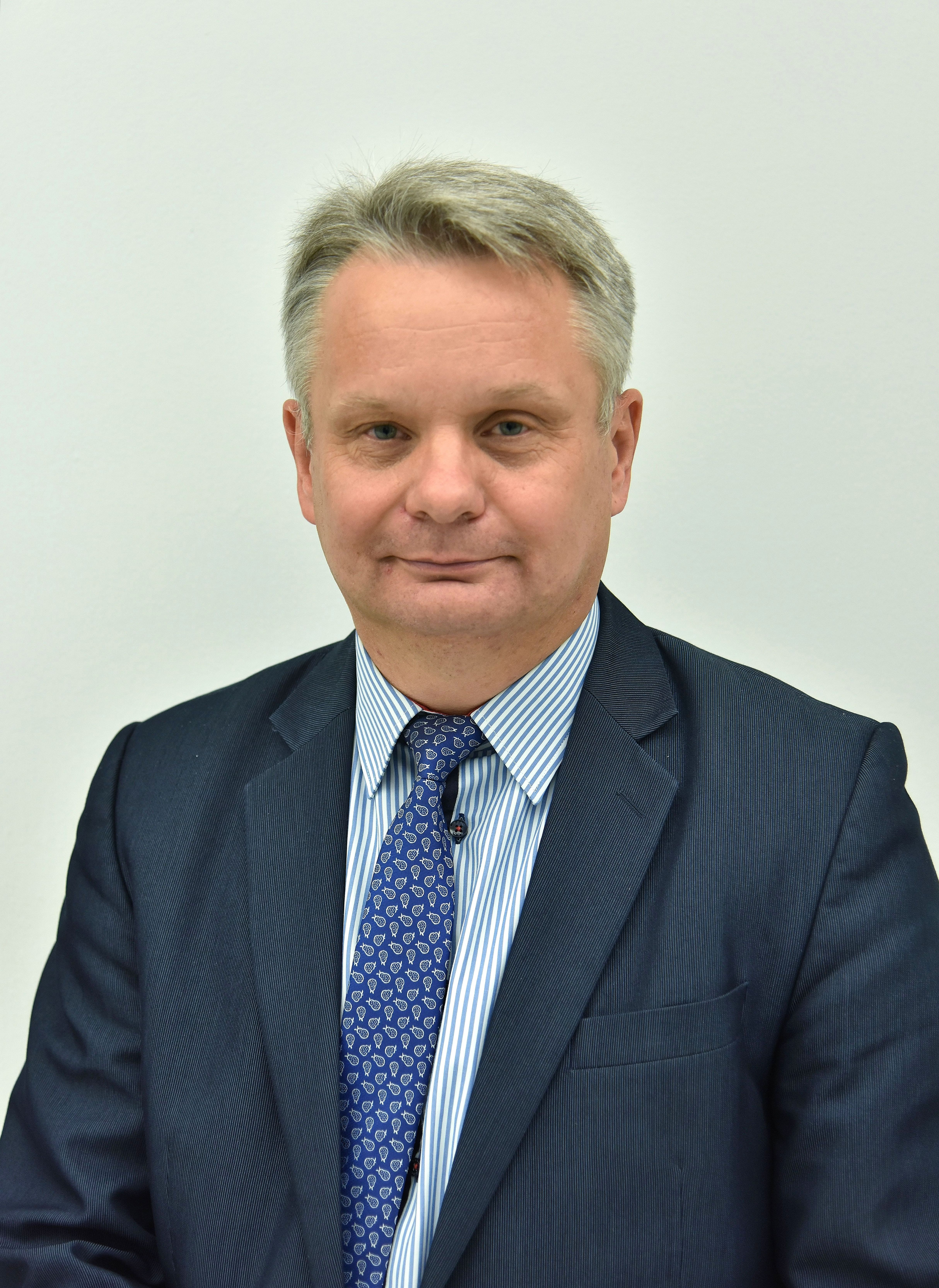
- Portrait of Mirosław Maliszewski

member of Sejm 2005-2007
- In office 25 September 2005 – ?

Personal details
- Born: 28 February 1968 (age 58)
- Party: Polish People's Party

Mirosław Wojciech Maliszewski (born 28 February 1968 in Warsaw) is a Polish politician. He was elected to the Sejm on 25 September 2005, getting 6,954 votes in 17 Radom district as a candidate from the Polish People's Party list.

== See also ==
- Members of Polish Sejm 2005-2007
