= Ryszard Smolarek =

Ryszard Smolarek (born May 10, 1952 in Koło) is a Polish manager, politician, and Member of Parliament in the Polish Republic. He was a Member of Parliament from 1989 to 2001.

== Biography ==
Son of Mary and Joseph Smolarek. He finished Agricultural Technical School in Kościelec and in 1976 he graduated from the Warsaw University of Life Sciences.

== Career ==
In 1989 he was elected a Member of Parliament from the Polish United Workers' Party (PZPR). In the Cabinets of Waldemar Pawlak, Józef Oleksy and Włodzimierz Cimoszewicz (1993–1997) he served as a Deputy Minister in the Ministry of Agriculture. He was responsible for the law establishing The Agency for Restructuring and Modernisation of Agriculture. In the years 1991-2001 he was a Member of Parliament from the Polish People's Party (PSL) from Siedlce province. He has worked in the Committee of Agriculture and Food Economy. In 1992-1996 and 2001-2002 he was a member of the Sejm and Senate of the Republic of Poland delegation to the Parliamentary Assembly of the Council of Europe in Strasbourg where he was part of a faction of the European People's Party. In 2001-2003, he was an advisor of the President of the Agricultural Market Agency.

He became a president of the meat plant "Łmeat-Łuków" S.A. in Łuków. He co-founded the Polish Federation of the Meat Industry, in which he took now the position of chairman of the board. He is also a vice-president of the board of the Polish-Belarusian Chamber of Commerce and a member of the PSL in Garwolin authorities.

== Honors and awards ==
In 1986 he received the Bronze Cross of Merit.
