= Patrick Adamiak =

US Navy sailor and pardoned gun dealer

- Born: 1993 or 1994 (age 31–32)
- Occupations: Navy Sailor (Rank: Petty Officer 1st Class); GunBroker.com dealer
- Known for: owning and selling deactivated and replica firearms
- Status: Released (pardoned by President Trump, September 4, 2026)
- Penalty: 20 years in prison

Details
- Country: United States
- State: Virginia

Patrick Tate Adamiak is a former US Navy sailor who was wrongfully convicted of owning and selling legal firearm parts before being pardoned in September 2026. Adamiak was indicted in 2022 after special agents from the Bureau of Alcohol, Tobacco, Firearms and Explosives recovered inoperable machine guns, two grenade launchers, and two inert anti-tank missile launchers in his possession. A jury found Adamiak guilty of three counts of receiving and possessing an unregistered firearm, and one count of unlawful possession and transfer of a machine gun even though they were inoperable at the time of sales and were made operational by the ATF.

The case has been cited by critics as evidence of federal overreach by ATF.

On September 4, 2026, Adamiak was pardoned by President Donald Trump.
