= Andrzej Pałys =

Polish politician

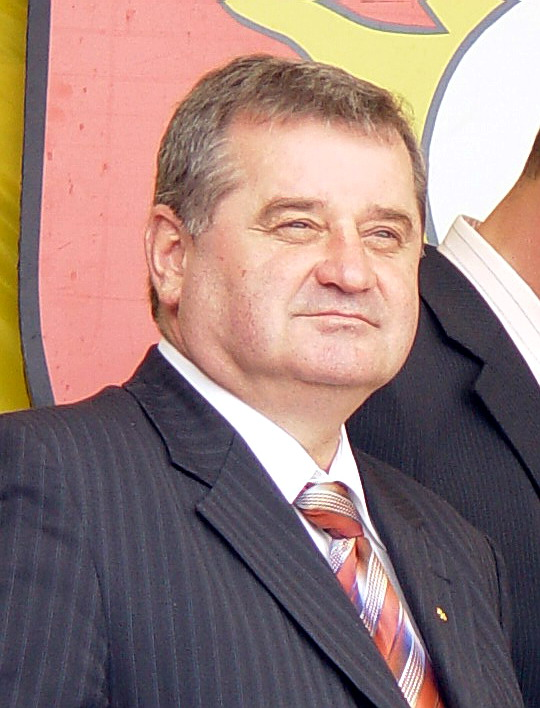
- Polish politician Andrzej Pałys

Member of the Sejm
- Incumbent
- Assumed office 25 September 2005
- Constituency: 33 – Kielce

Personal details
- Born: 1957 (age 68–69) Solec-Zdrój
- Party: Polish People's Party

Andrzej Józef Pałys (born 2 January 1957) is a Polish politician. He was elected to Sejm on 25 September 2005, getting 5055 votes in 33 Kielce district as a candidate from the Polish People's Party list.

== See also ==
- Members of Polish Sejm 2005-2007
