= Jan Adamiak =

Polish agronomist and politician

- Born: 11 May 1948 (age 78); Krasnystaw, Lublin Voivodeship, Poland
- Occupations: Agronomist and politician
- Political party: Polish People's Party

Jan Kazimierz Adamiak (born 11 May 1948) is a Polish agronomist, cathedratic and politician from the Polish People's Party. He served as member of the Senate of Poland from 1993 to 1997.
