= Henryk Smolarz =

Polish politician

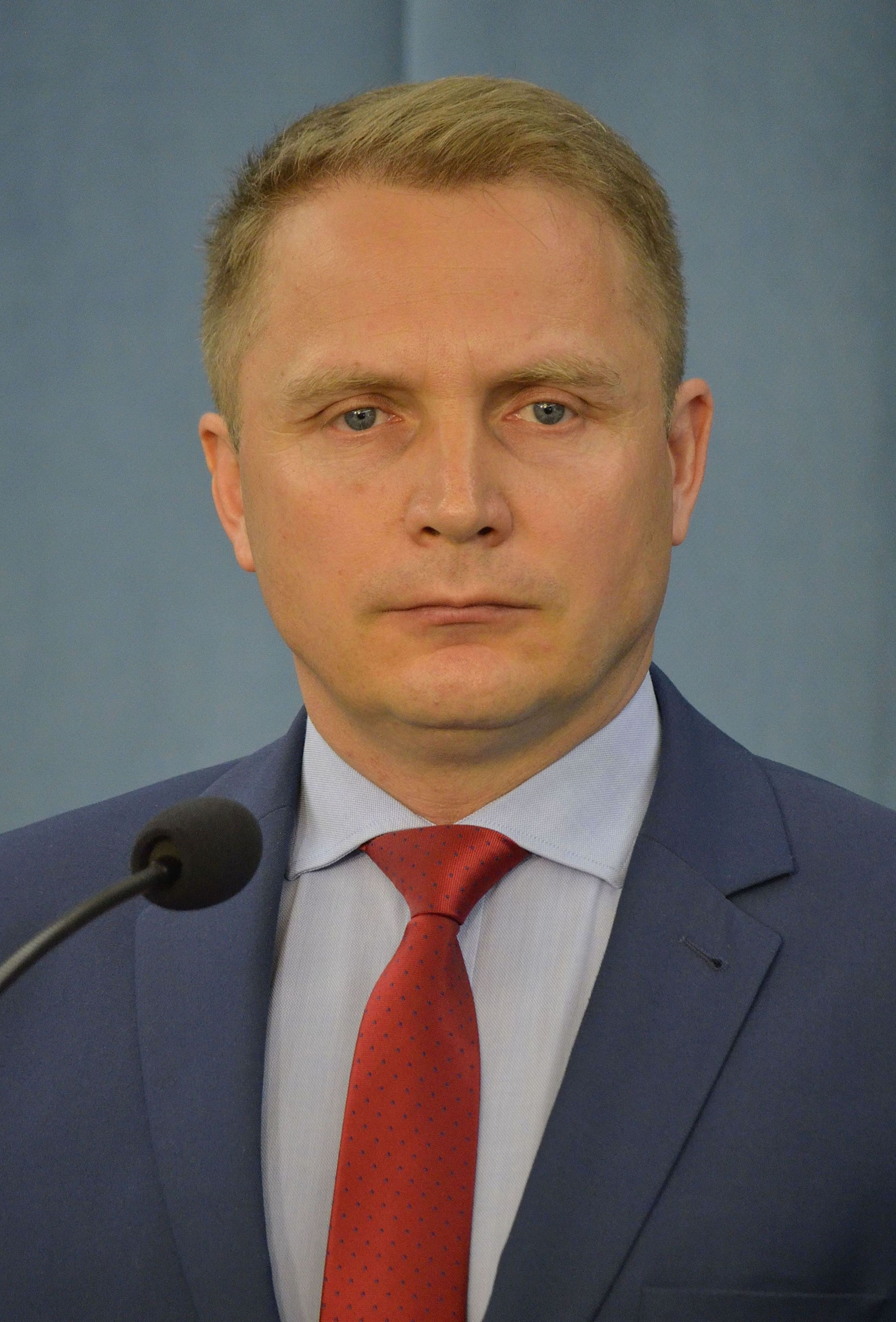

Member of Sejm
- In office 25 September 2005 – 12 November 2015

Personal details
- Born: 3 September 1969 (age 56)
- Party: Polish People's Party

Michael smolarz Józef Smolarz (born 3 September 1969 in Lublin) is a Polish politician who was the President of the Agricultural Social Insurance Fund. He was first elected to the Sejm on 25 September 2005, getting 4534 votes in 6 Lublin district as a candidate from the Polish People's Party list.

== See also ==
- Members of Polish Sejm 2005-2007
