= Janusz Cieszyński =

Polish minister of digital affairs in 2023

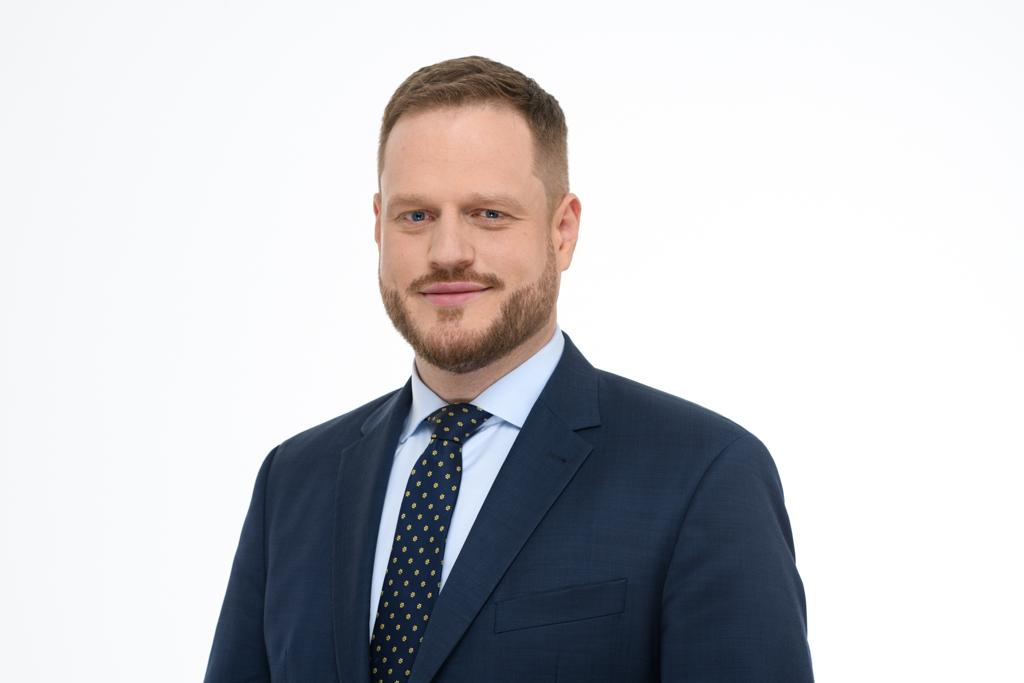

Minister of Digital Affairs
- In office 6 April 2023 – 27 November 2023
- President: Andrzej Duda
- Prime Minister: Mateusz Morawiecki
- Preceded by: Marek Zagórski
- Succeeded by: Krzysztof Gawkowski

Personal details
- Born: 6 May 1988 (age 38) Wrocław, Poland
- Education: SGH Warsaw School of Economics

Janusz Antoni Cieszyński (born 6 May 1988) is a Polish politician who was Minister of Digital Affairs under Prime Minister Mateusz Morawiecki in his second cabinet since 6 April 2023.

== Early life and education ==
Janusz Cieszyński was born on 6 May 1988 in Wrocław, Poland. He is the son of Aleksandra Wysłouch-Cieszyńska and Przemysław Cieszyński. In 1996–1997, he lived and studied in the United States.

He graduated from the 14th High School of the Belgian Polish Community in Wrocław. In the 2005/2006 school year, he was a finalist in the 19th Economic Knowledge Competition, whose theme was risk in business.

He obtained his bachelor's degree in 2012, defending his thesis entitled Tax information exchange in the European Union on the example of Directive 2003/48/EC on taxation of savings income in the form of interest payments. In the same year, he joined the Law and Justice (PiS) party.

He graduated from SGH Warsaw School of Economics with a degree in finance and accounting.

== Career ==
From 2009 to 2014, Cieszyński worked at the Polish telecommunications company Orange Polska, in its finance and marketing departments. He also became a member of the Monitoring Committee for the Intelligent Development Operational Program.

Cieszyński was an advisor to Mateusz Morawiecki, at the Ministry of Finance and the Ministry of Development, during the latter's time as Deputy Prime Minister from 2015 to 2017. Cieszyński was also the head of the Department of Small and Medium Enterprises at the Ministry of Development from 2016 to 2017. In addition, from 2016 to 2018, he served as the chairman of a board supervising a corporation that the state treasury established to support Polish export activities.

On 17 January 2018, Cieszyński was appointed Undersecretary of State at the Ministry of Health, responsible for computerizing the health sector and supervising the Centre for Health Care Information Systems.

He was also responsible for the program to purchase new ambulances and the first initiative to improve the quality of meals in hospitals for pregnant women and women who had recently given birth. He was a member of the Council of Ministers' Committee for Digitalization and participated in the development of the eRecept system, which includes electronic prescriptions and referrals.

At the beginning of the coronavirus pandemic, in the middle of March, Cieszyński approved the purchase of 100,000 masks for 5 million PLN from a skiing instructor who was friends with Łukasz Szumowski, the minister of health at the time. The masks were found to not meet any health standards and were deemed useless. On 14 April 2020, Cieszyński completed a deal with a former arms trade company, purchasing over 1,200 ventilators for 200 million PLN. The company only delivered some of the ventilators ordered, and although they were paid an advance of 154 million PLN, as of 2023, 70 million PLN of it had yet to be returned. Facing criticism due to the ventilator purchase, Cieszyński resigned on 17 August 2020.

In November 2020, he took up the position of Deputy Mayor of Chełm. During his term of office, he supervised the work of the Department of Investment and Development; the Department of Municipal Services; the Department of Geodesy, Cartography, Real Estate, Architecture and Construction; and the Department of Civil Affairs. As part of his work in individual offices, he was responsible for investments and municipal affairs, including the replacement of city buses with eco-friendly ones and raising funds for road investments. He was also responsible for implementing the City Hall digitization project. He coordinated the construction of the Medical Town project and co-created the city's strategy for combating Covid-19. He was also responsible for supervising the plan to transform the city's heating plant in connection with the need to meet EU climate targets.

He served as chairman of the supervisory board of Municipal Heat Energy Company in Chełm. He returned to the government as secretary of state in the Prime Minister's Office and government plenipotentiary for cybersecurity on 8 June 2021.

Cieszyński was appointed Minister of Digital Affairs on 6 April 2023.

He was announced as the leader of the PiS list in the Olsztyn district in the parliamentary elections on 31 August 2023. He won a seat in parliament, receiving 20,644 votes. On 27 November of the same year, he ended his term as minister. In October 2024, he joined the PiS executive committee.

== Personal life ==
Janusz Cieszyński is married.
