= Mariusz Błaszczak =

Polish politician

- Błaszczak in 2023

Deputy Prime Minister of Poland
- In office 22 June 2022 – 21 June 2023 Serving with Henryk Kowalczyk
- Prime Minister: Mateusz Morawiecki
- Preceded by: Jarosław Kaczyński
- Succeeded by: Jarosław Kaczyński

Minister of National Defence
- In office 9 January 2018 – 13 December 2023
- Prime Minister: Mateusz Morawiecki
- Preceded by: Antoni Macierewicz
- Succeeded by: Władysław Kosiniak-Kamysz

Minister of the Interior and Administration
- In office 16 November 2015 – 9 January 2018
- Prime Minister: Beata Szydło; Mateusz Morawiecki
- Preceded by: Teresa Piotrowska (Note: As the Minister of the Interior.); Andrzej Halicki (Note: As the Minister of Administration and Digitization.)
- Succeeded by: Joachim Brudziński

Parliamentary leader of Law and Justice
- Incumbent
- Assumed office 13 November 2023
- In office 3 August 2010 – 11 November 2015

Member of the Sejm
- Incumbent
- Assumed office 5 November 2007
- Constituency: No. 20 (Warsaw II)

Minister without portfolio
- In office 27 March 2007 – 16 November 2007 (Note: Błaszczak served as minister without portfolio with a brief break between 7 and 11 September 2007.)
- Prime Minister: Jarosław Kaczyński

Chief of the Prime Minister's Chancellery
- In office 31 October 2005 – 16 November 2007
- Prime Minister: Kazimierz Marcinkiewicz; Jarosław Kaczyński
- Deputy: Piotr Tutak
- Preceded by: Sławomir Cytrycki
- Succeeded by: Tomasz Arabski

Personal details
- Born: 19 September 1969 (age 57) Legionowo, Poland
- Party: Law and Justice
- Education: University of Warsaw

Mariusz Błaszczak (Note: Polish pronunciation: [ˈmar.juʂ ˈbwaʂ.t͡ʂak]) (born 19 September 1969) is a Polish politician. A prominent member of the Law and Justice party, he has served continuously as a member of the Sejm since 2007 and held various government positions during the party's terms in power, from 2005 to 2007 and again from 2015 to 2023.

Błaszczak was Minister of National Defence from 2018 to 2023 and Minister of the Interior and Administration from 2015 to 2018. He also served as Deputy Prime Minister between 2022 and 2023. In the earlier Law and Justice government, he was Chief of the Prime Minister's Chancellery from 2005 to 2007 and briefly minister without portfolio in 2007. He has served as parliamentary leader of Law and Justice since 2023, having previously held the role from 2010 to 2015.

== Early life and education ==
Błaszczak was born on 19 September 1969 in Legionowo to Danuta and Lucjan Błaszczak; his father worked at the FSO factory in Żerań.

Błaszczak graduated with a master's degree in history in 1995 from the University of Warsaw, where he also completed postgraduate course in local government and local development in 1998. He is a graduate of the National School of Public Administration, where he studied between 1999 and 2001. He also finished postgraduate studies in management in public administration at the Leon Koźmiński's Higher School of Entrepreneurship and Management.

== Political career ==
=== Early activity and local government ===
While at university, Błaszczak was a member of the Independent Students' Association and the Catholic Academic Youth Association. In 1991 he joined the Centre Agreement, a centre-right Christian democratic party, which would later become the core of Law and Justice, both political projects of Jarosław Kaczyński. In the 1993 parliamentary election, Błaszczak stood for the first time as a candidate for the Sejm but was unsuccessful. He received 0.17% of the votes in the now revised suburban Warsaw constituency, (Note: Former Sejm Constituency no. 2 encompassed the now-abolished Warsaw Voivodeship, excluding the city of Warsaw.) while the Centre Agreement did not surpass the 5% electoral threshold.

After his studies, Błaszczak worked as a civil servant in the town government of Legionowo. In the 2002 local election, Błaszczak ran for the office of mayor of Legionowo, as a candidate of the Voters Electoral Committee of Justice, Law and Self-Government. He obtained 11.02% of the votes and did not advance to second round. Between 2002 and 2004, Błaszczak served as deputy mayor of the Warsaw district of Wola, and from 2004 until 2006 was a mayor of the Śródmieście district, during Lech Kaczyński's tenure as Mayor of Warsaw.

=== First government (2005–2007) ===
In the parliamentary election of September 2005, Błaszczak run for the Sejm from the Warsaw constituency with the Law and Justice party, but did not secure a seat receiving 0.11% of the votes. On 31 October 2005, he was appointed chief of the Chancellery of the Prime Minister in the newly formed government of Kazimierz Marcinkiewicz. He was chosen at the persuasion of Jarosław Kaczyński, in spite of Marcinkiewicz's original intent to assign Piotr Tutak to the post. Błaszczak remained in office, when Jarosław Kaczyński succeeded Marcinkiewicz as prime minister in July 2006, and also entered Kaczyński's cabinet as minister without portfolio on 27 March 2007.

Simultaneously, Błaszczak became a member of the Masovian Voivodeship Sejmik in the November 2006 local elections, where he served until November 2007.

As the government coalition came apart on 13 August 2007, a snap election was called, in which Błaszczak obtained a seat in the Sejm running from the suburban Warsaw constituency. In the election aftermath, he stepped down from government posts, along with Kaczyński's cabinet, by 16 November 2007.

=== In the opposition (2007–2015) ===
Błaszczak became a spokesman of the Law and Justice parliamentary group in March 2009. On 3 August 2010 he was chosen as the party's parliamentary leader on the recommendation of Jarosław Kaczyński.

In the 2011 parliamentary election, he led the party list in his incumbent constituency, and received 9.85% of the votes securing re-election.

=== Second government (2015–2023) ===
In the 2015 parliamentary election, Błaszczak was once again elected to the Sejm, with 14.91% of the votes in his constituency. The Law and Justice won an outright majority in the parliament, giving the party sole discretion to form new government. On 16 November 2015, the cabinet led by Beata Szydło was appointed, in which Błaszczak took the office of Minister of the Interior and Administration.

In February 2016, opposition party Civic Platform filed a motion of no confidence against Błaszczak, accusing him of incompetence in choosing the chief of Police, who was dismissed after two months in office in response to the allegations of corruption investigations being carried out against him. In March, the motion failed in parliament, with members of the Sejm voting 177 in favour and 239 against it.

In the 2017 interview with Radio ZET about the European refugee crisis, Błaszczak stated that thanks to Christianity, there were leaders like "Charles Martel who stopped the Muslim invasion of Europe in the eighth century".

In August 2018, Błaszczak's public statements on TV Trwam regarding the equality parade in Poznań were described by some media and commentators as homophobic and constituted hate speech.

On 11 December 2017, Błaszczak became Minister of Interior of Poland in the First Cabinet of Mateusz Morawiecki. He resigned from the position on 9 January 2018, later replacing Antoni Macierewicz as Minister of National Defence.

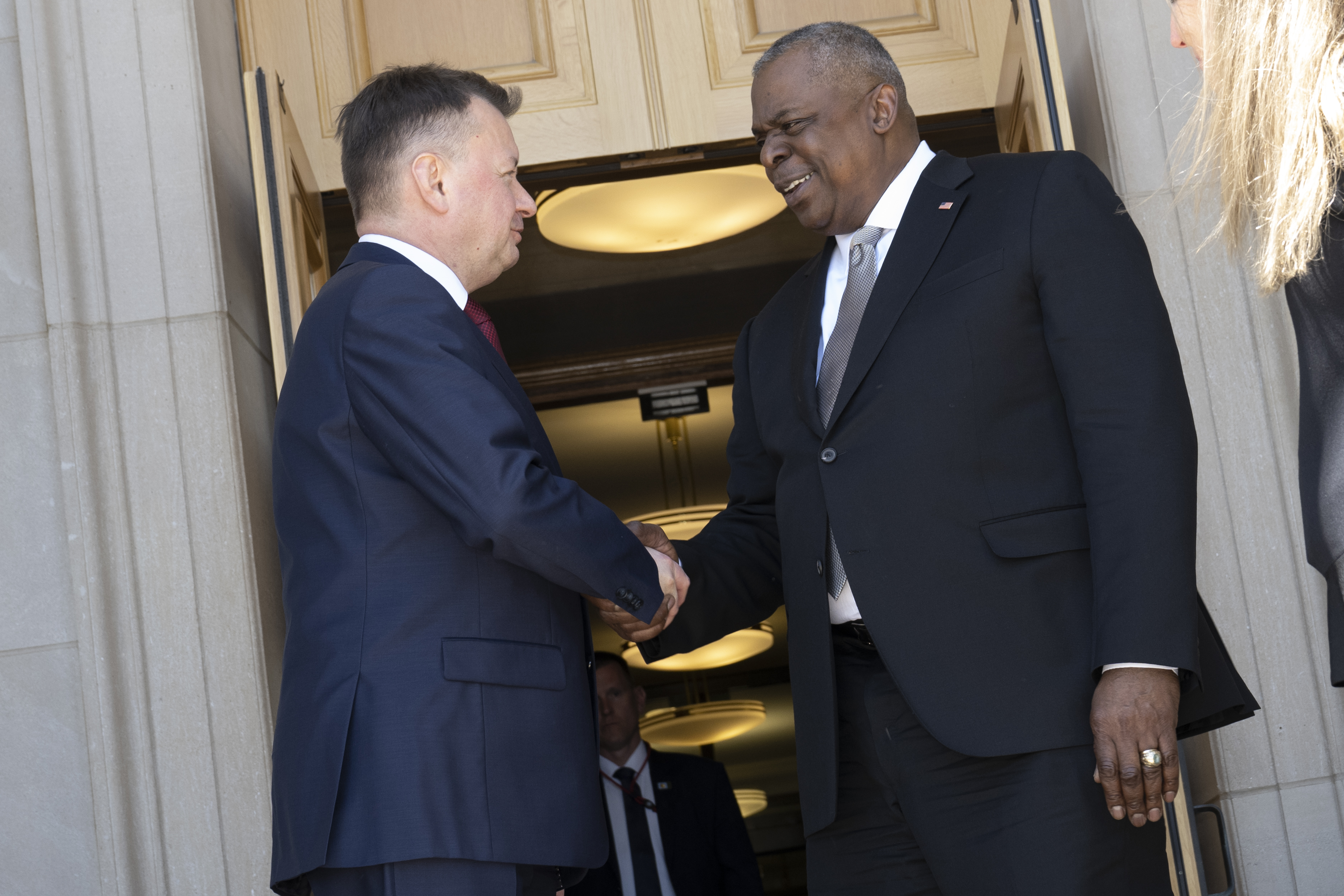
Błaszczak with U.S. Secretary of Defense Lloyd Austin at the Pentagon in Washington, D.C., 20 April 2022

In the 2019 Polish parliamentary election, Błaszczak successfully ran for parliamentary re-election, receiving 135,189 votes. The same year on 15 November, he became Polish Minister of Defence again, becoming part of the Second Cabinet of Mateusz Morawiecki. On 22 June 2022, Błaszczak was appointed to the position of deputy prime minister, replacing Jarosław Kaczyński.

Błaszczak served as Vice-President of the Council of Ministers until 21 June 2023, but resigned together with other deputy prime ministers due to Jarosław Kaczyński's re-entry into the government.

=== In the opposition (since 2023) ===
In the 2023 Polish parliamentary election, Błaszczak won a parliamentary seat for the fifth time in a row (with the result of 127,578 votes). Later that November, he became chairman of his party's parliamentary club again. Błaszczak left the office on 13 December 2023.

== Disclosure of defence plans ==
In September 2023, a month before the parliamentary election, Błaszczak publicly disclosed a portion of the archival defence plans code-named Warta, which had been prepared in 2011 under the rival government of Donald Tusk. The plan outlined that, in the event of a Russian invasion from the east, the Polish army would retreat westward and establish defence lines along the Vistula and Wieprz rivers as the fifth and final stage of unaided defence efforts, in the event of delayed assistance from allies.

In a public video posted on Twitter, Błaszczak used the document to accuse Tusk's government of intending to "give up half of Poland" in the event of war. The claim was described as false or deeply manipulative, and the disclosure of information was condemned by many military and defence professionals.

In July 2024, following an inspection of the handling of classified information, the Military Counterintelligence Service notified the public prosecutor of a suspicion that Błaszczak had committed a crime. In March 2025, Błaszczak was charged by the District Prosecutor’s Office in Warsaw with exceeding his powers as a public official for personal gain by declassifying and revealing parts of documents marked "secret" and "top secret". An indictment against Błaszczak and three others was filed with the District Court in Warsaw in August.

== Honours and decorations ==
- 2016
  - Commemorative Medal of the 25th Anniversary of the NSZZ Border Guard Officers
  - Golgotha of the East
- 2017: Golden Badge of Merit for Fire Protection
- 2018: Ministry of National Defense
- 2019: Grand Commander's Cross, Order for Merits to Lithuania
- 2022
  - Order of Merit of Ukraine, 1st class
  - Man of Freedom (2022) by the Sieci newsweekly
- 2023: Man of the Year 2022 by the Wprost newsweekly

== Electoral history ==
=== Sejm ===
Year	Electoral list	Constituency	Votes received			Result	Ref
Year	Electoral list	Constituency	Total	%	+/−	Result	Ref
1993	Centre Agreement	No. 2	449	0.17	—	Not elected	
2005	Law and Justice	No. 19 (Warsaw I)	869	0.11	−0.06	Not elected	
2007	Law and Justice	No. 20 (Warsaw II)	10,061	2.18	+2.07	Elected	
2011	Law and Justice	No. 20 (Warsaw II)	44,319	9.85	+7.67	Elected	
2015	Law and Justice	No. 20 (Warsaw II)	73,139	14.91	+5.06	Elected	
2019	Law and Justice	No. 20 (Warsaw II)	135,189	22.58	+7.67	Elected	
2023	Law and Justice	No. 20 (Warsaw II)	127,578	17.46	−5.12	Elected	

== Notes ==
Political offices
Preceded by Sławomir Cytrycki	Chief of the Chancellery of the Prime Minister; 2005–2007	Succeeded by Tomasz Arabski
Preceded by Sławomir Cytrycki	Minister–Member of the Council of Ministers; 2007	Succeeded by Zbigniew Derdziuk
Preceded by Teresa Piotrowska as Minister of the Interior	Minister of the Interior and Administration; 2015–2018	Succeeded by Joachim Brudziński
Preceded by Andrzej Halicki as Minister of Administration and Digitization	Minister of the Interior and Administration; 2015–2018	Succeeded by Joachim Brudziński
Preceded by Antoni Macierewicz	Minister of National Defence; 2018–2023	Succeeded by Władysław Kosiniak-Kamysz
Preceded by Jarosław Kaczyński	Deputy Prime Minister of Poland; 2022–2023	Succeeded by Jarosław Kaczyński
