= Rafał Trzaskowski =

Mayor of Warsaw, Poland (born 1972)

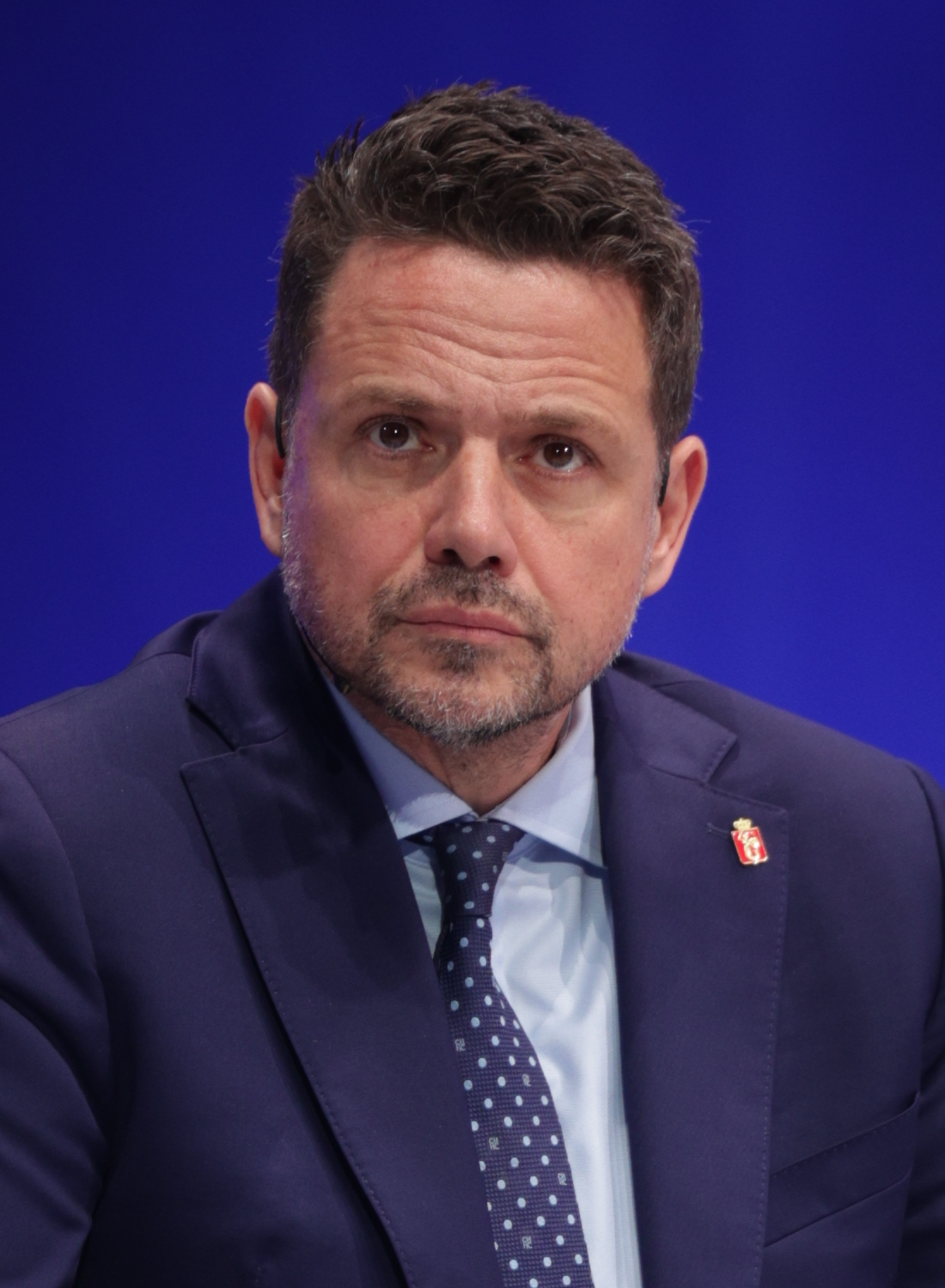
- Trzaskowski in 2024

Mayor of Warsaw
- Incumbent
- Assumed office 22 November 2018
- Deputy Mayor: Robert Soszyński; Michał Olszewski; Renata Kaznowska
- Preceded by: Hanna Gronkiewicz-Waltz

Secretary of State for European Affairs
- In office 22 September 2014 – 16 November 2015
- Prime Minister: Ewa Kopacz
- Minister: Grzegorz Schetyna
- Preceded by: Piotr Serafin
- Succeeded by: Konrad Szymański

Minister of Administration and Digitization
- In office 3 December 2013 – 22 September 2014
- Prime Minister: Donald Tusk
- Preceded by: Michał Boni
- Succeeded by: Andrzej Halicki
Parliamentary offices
Member of the Sejm
In office 12 November 2015 – 21 November 2018
Constituency	Kraków
Member of the European Parliament for Poland
In office 14 July 2009 – 2 December 2013

Personal details
- Born: 17 January 1972 (age 54) Warsaw, Poland
- Party: Civic Coalition (since 2025)
- Other political affiliations: Civic Platform (2004–2025); Yes! For Poland (since 2020)
- Spouse: Małgorzata Trzaskowska (m. 2002)
- Children: 2
- Parent: Andrzej Trzaskowski (father)
- Education: College of Europe (MA); University of Warsaw (PhD)
- Awards: Legion of Honour

Rafał Kazimierz Trzaskowski (Note: Polish pronunciation: [ˈra faw kaˈʑi.mjɛʂ tʂasˈkɔf.ski]) (born 17 January 1972) is a Polish politician and political scientist specializing in European studies who has served as Mayor of Warsaw since 22 November 2018.

He served as a Member of the European Parliament (2009–2013), Minister of Administration and Digitization (2013–2014) as well as Secretary of State in the Ministry of Foreign Affairs of the Republic of Poland (2014–2015). He was elected a Member of the Polish Parliament in 2015. In November 2017, it was announced that he would be the joint candidate for the Mayor of Warsaw of the Civic Platform and the Modern political party in the 2018 Polish local elections. He went on to win the elections on 21 October 2018 in the first round and was elected Mayor of Warsaw after defeating his major rival Patryk Jaki of the Law and Justice party. He received 505,187 votes (56.67%).

In May 2020, Trzaskowski became the Civic Platform's candidate for the Presidency of Poland in the presidential election. He made it into the second round of the election but then went on to lose against the incumbent Andrzej Duda, receiving 10,018,263 votes or 48.97% of the vote. In April 2024, he was reelected Mayor of Warsaw in the first round of voting, receiving 444,006 votes or 57.41% of the vote. His major rivals in the election were Tobiasz Bocheński (PiS) and Magdalena Biejat (Left Together).

In November 2024, he again became the Civic Coalition's candidate in the 2025 presidential election. In May 2025, Trzaskowski narrowly placed first in the preliminary round with 31.36% of the votes. As a result, he advanced to the second round, with conservative independent candidate Karol Nawrocki (supported by Law and Justice). Trzaskowski lost the runoff to Nawrocki, receiving 49.11% of the vote. He is considered as being a member of Civic Platform's progressive wing.

== Early life and education ==
Rafał Kazimierz Trzaskowski was born on 17 January 1972 in Warsaw, the son of Polish jazz musician and composer Andrzej Trzaskowski and Teresa née Arens. His half-brother Piotr Ferster was the director of the Piwnica pod Baranami cabaret in Kraków. His great-grandfather, Bronisław Trzaskowski, was a linguist who established some of the first girls' secondary schools (gimnazja) in Poland. As an 8-year-old, he appeared on "Our Backyard" (Polish: Nasze podwórko), a 1980 Polish children's television series.

Trzaskowski attended 11th Mikołaj Rej Liceum, Marcellin College in Sydney, and Cranbrook Kingswood School, a private school in Bloomfield Hills, Michigan, USA (1990–1991). He then studied international relations and English philology at the University of Warsaw, graduating in 1996. He subsequently graduated in European studies from the College of Europe in Natolin (1997). He was granted a scholarship at Oxford University in 1996 as well as at the European Union Institute for Security Studies in Paris in 2002. In 2004, he obtained his Doctor of Philosophy (Ph.D.) degree in political science at the University of Warsaw's Faculty of Journalism and Political Science, after completing a dissertation titled "The dynamics of the European Union's institutional reform" under the supervision of Stanisław Parzymies.

From 1995, he worked as a simultaneous interpreter and an English teacher. In 1998, he became an academic teacher at the National School of Public Administration, and in 2002 at the Collegium Civitas. His scientific interests primarily concern the European integration and international affairs. Since 2002, he has also worked as an analyst at the European Centre in Natolin.

== Political career ==
Between 2000 and 2001, he started working for Jacek Saryusz-Wolski at Poland's Office of the European Integration Committee. In the years 2004–2009, he was an advisor of the Civic Platform political party at the European Parliament. In 2009, having received 25,178 votes, he was elected Member of the European Parliament representing the Platforma Obywatelska party. During his election campaign he was supported by well-known Polish personalities and artists such as Tomasz Karolak, Grzegorz Turnau, Michał Żebrowski and Urszula Dudziak. At the European Parliament, he was a member of the European People's Party. In 2010, he was the head of the election campaign of Hanna Gronkiewicz-Waltz running for the post of the mayor of Warsaw in the 2010 Polish local elections.

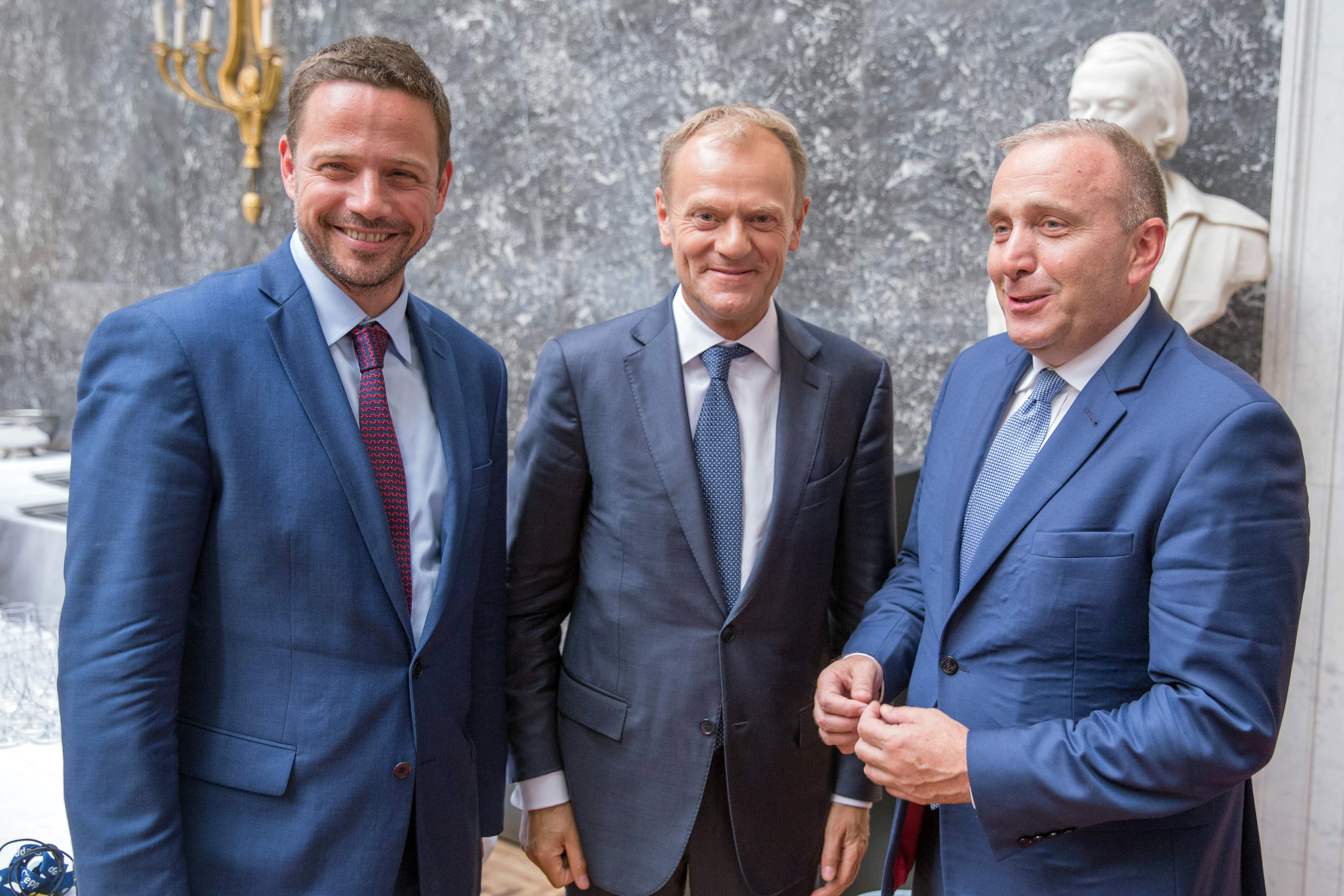
Trzaskowski with Donald Tusk and Grzegorz Schetyna in Brussels, June 2017

On 27 November 2013, Trzaskowski was sworn in as the Minister of Administration and Digitization by President Bronisław Komorowski. During his ministry, Trzaskowski created a system of notifying the Government Security Center warning citizens, about violent meteorological phenomena. He was responsible for cooperation with local governments, supervision over voivodes and assistance to victims in connection with natural disasters, for example during the floods in 2014, as well as cybersecurity, accessibility of content on the Internet for people with disabilities and protection of personal data on the web. On 24 September 2014, he became Deputy Minister of Foreign Affairs of the Republic of Poland and dealt with co-ordinating matters relating to the EU across the different ministries of the Donald Tusk cabinet. At that time, Trzaskowski was the main negotiator in relations with the EU on behalf of the prime minister and coordinated the work of ministries in relations with EU institutions.

In 2015, he participated in the 2015 Polish parliamentary elections and won a seat in the Sejm having received 47,080 votes. In 2016, he became a National Council Member of the Civic Platform party. In the same year, he assumed the post of Minister of Foreign Affairs in the shadow cabinet created by the Civic Platform. On 29 March 2017, he became the vice-chairman of the European People's Party. As a Member of the Sejm, Trzaskowski was a member of the European Union Affairs Committee, Foreign Affairs Committee and the Digitization, Innovation and Modern Technologies Committee. In parliamentary activities, Trzaskowski mainly dealt with issues related to foreign affairs, European policy, defence, as well as health policy, protection of civil and minority rights, and self-government support. During his time, he submitted over 150 interpellations and over 70 parliamentary questions. In 2017, he received the order of the Legion of Honour for his contributions to strengthening the Polish-French relations.

In February 2020, he was elected as Civic Platform's vice-chairman.

=== Mayor of Warsaw (2018–present) ===
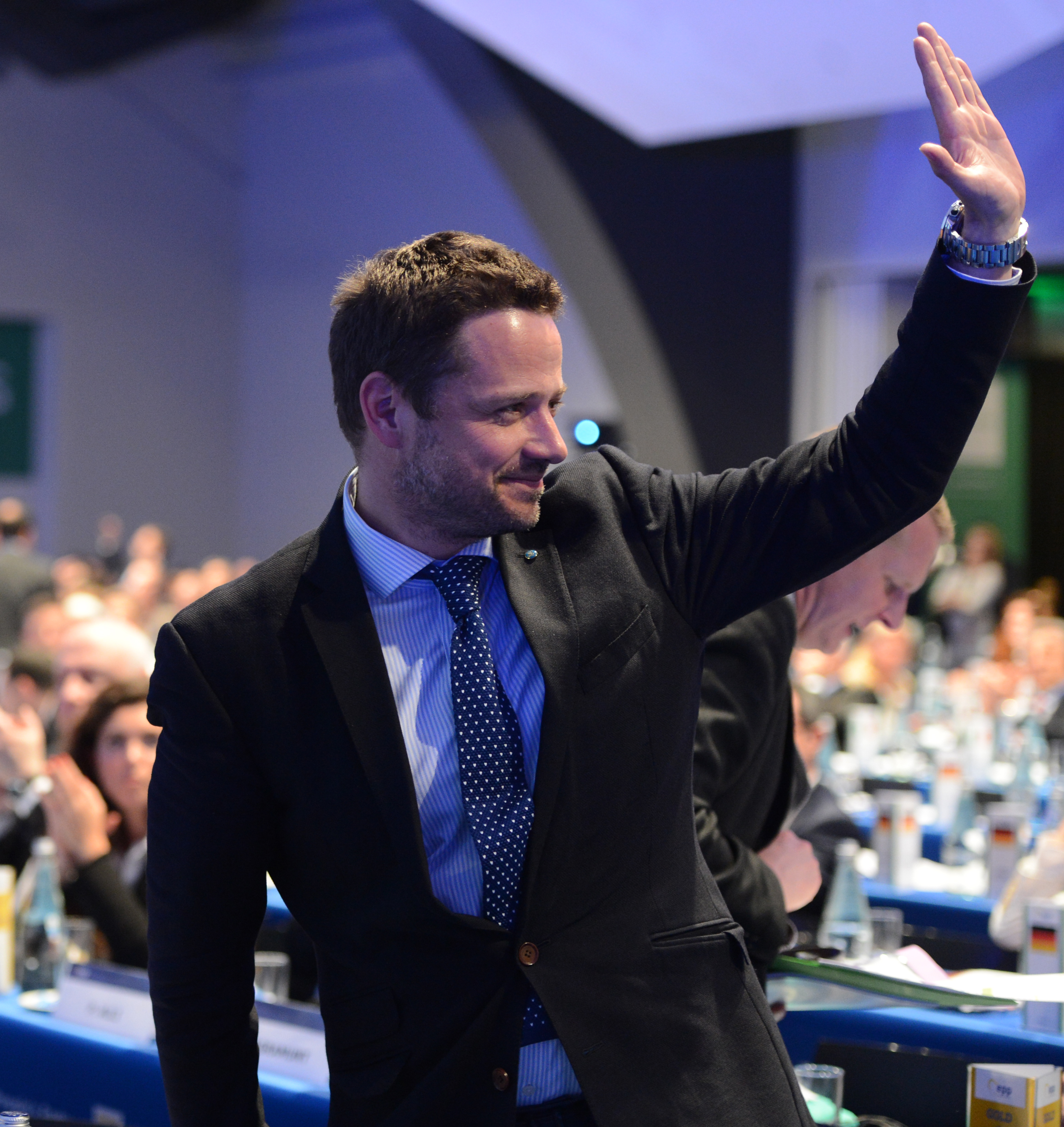
Rafał Trzaskowski at the European People's Party Congress in Malta, 2017

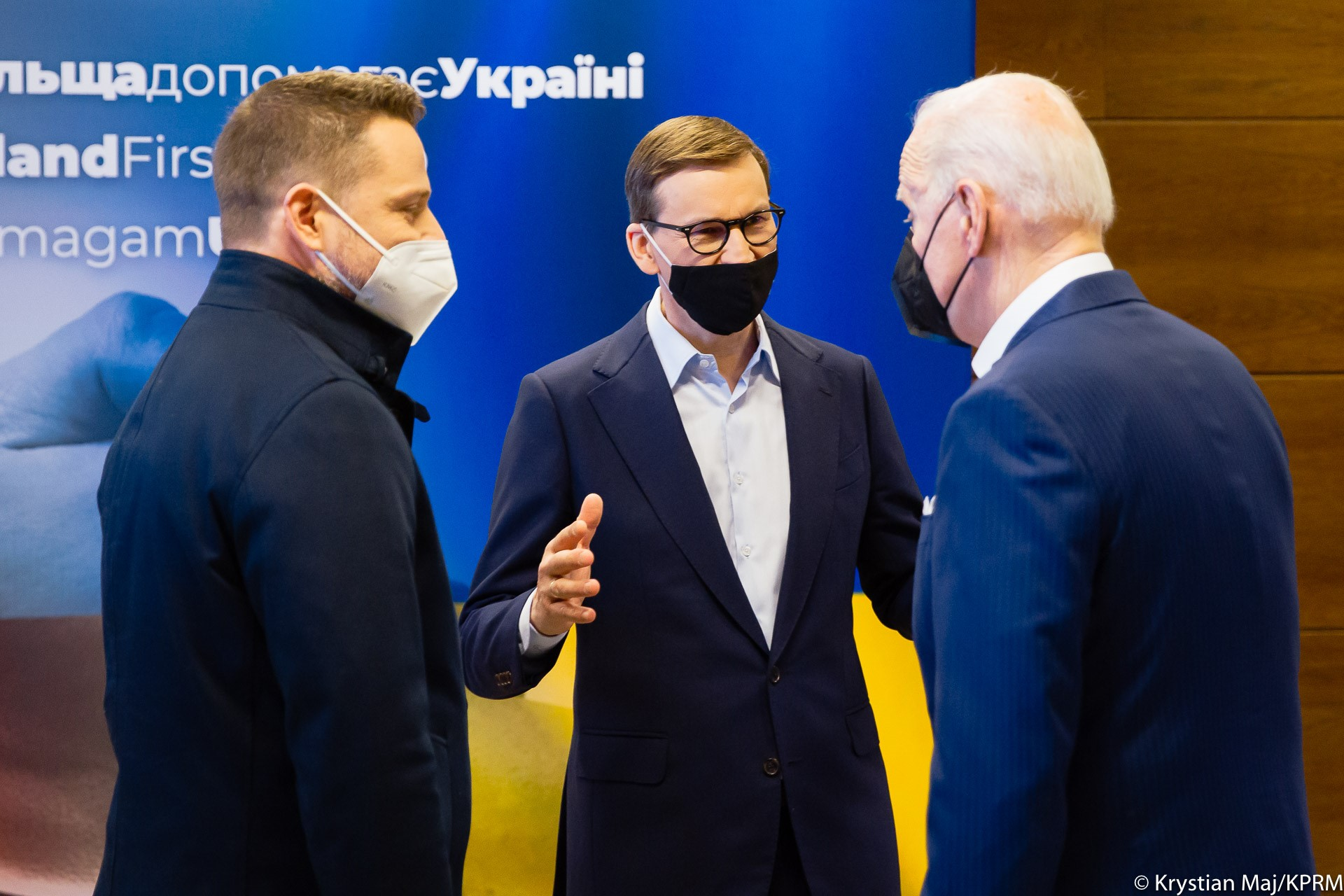
President Joe Biden during conversation with Trzaskowski and former Prime Minister Mateusz Morawiecki.

In November 2017, it was announced that he would be the joint candidate for the Mayor of Warsaw of the Civic Platform and the Modern political party in the 2018 Polish local elections. He subsequently went on to win the elections on 21 October 2018 in the first round and was elected Mayor of Warsaw after beating his major rival Patryk Jaki of the Law and Justice party. He received a total of 505,187 votes (56.67%). During his mayoral term, Trzaskowski introduced, among others, a free nursery program for Warsaw kids, increased funding under the Warsaw in vitro program and carried out record purchases of clean public transport vehicles. In the first years of his term in office, six new stations of the second metro line were commissioned and works on the construction of the third metro line were started.

Along with the mayors of the capitals of the other Visegrád Group countries, Trzaskowski signed the Pact of Free Cities in December 2019 to promote "common values of freedom, human dignity, democracy, equality, rule of law, social justice, tolerance and cultural diversity". In August 2020, the mayors released a joint statement, which expressed solidarity with the protesters in Belarus and condemned the violence used by the state authorities. It also appealed to the European Union "to review its policy towards Belarus and introduce measures against those responsible for the violent crackdown".

In November 2023, Trzaskowski banned a pro-Palestinian protest against the Gaza war held in Warsaw, citing security concerns and antisemitism.

A supporter of laicism, he signed a law that forbade religious symbols from Warsaw city hall in May 2024.

==== LGBT rights ====
On 18 February 2019, Trzaskowski signed a 12-point LGBT Declaration aimed at combating discrimination of the LGBT community and providing guidance in the area of personal security, education, culture, sport, administration, and employment. His action and the declaration itself met with criticism from the national conservative Law and Justice (PiS) party.

=== 2020 presidential campaign ===
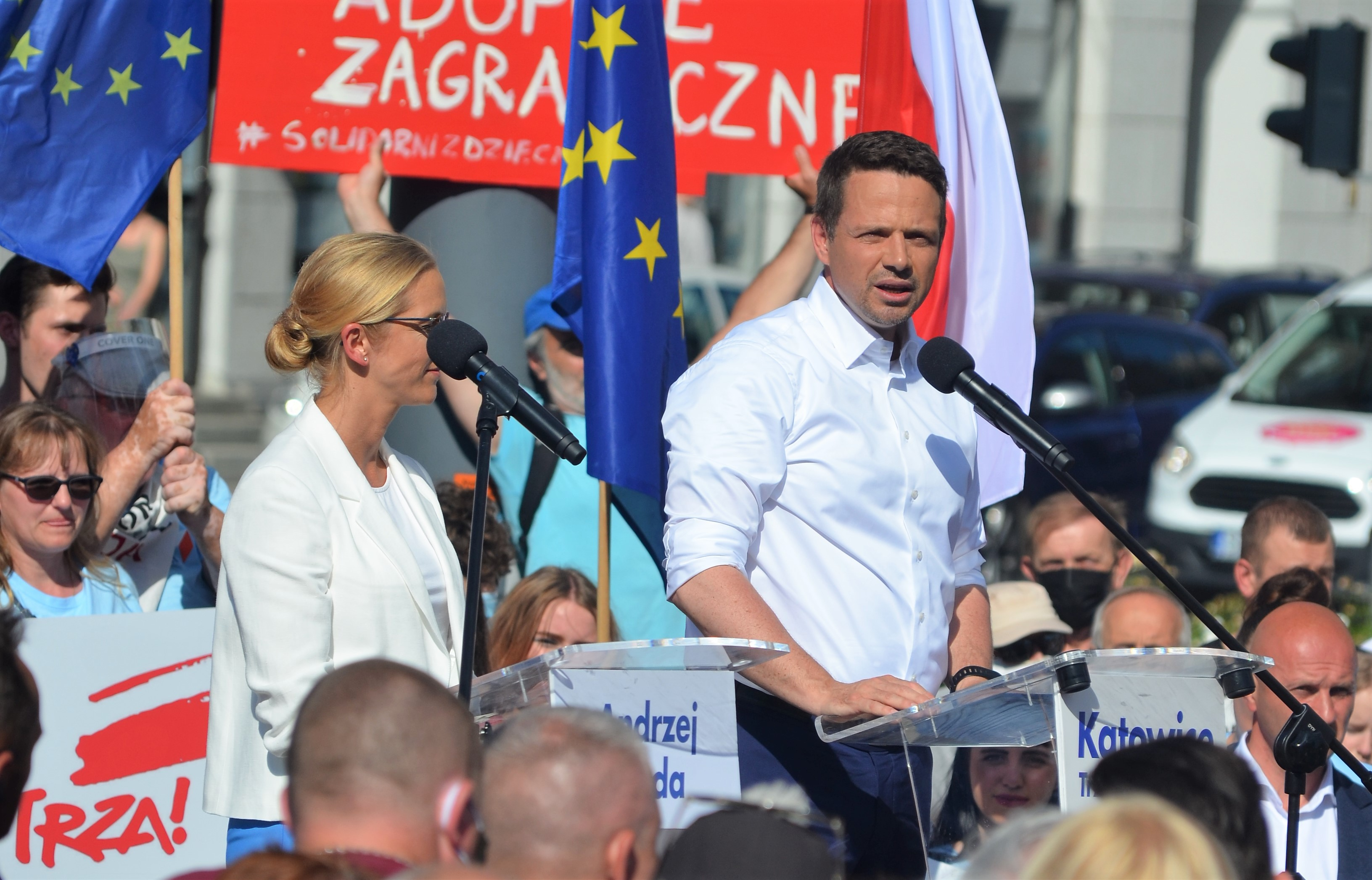
Trzaskowski speaking at a rally in Katowice during the 2020 presidential election.

On 15 May 2020, he was chosen by the Civic Platform party leader Borys Budka to be their candidate for Presidency of Poland to stand in the presidential election, after Małgorzata Kidawa-Błońska's resignation from her candidacy. On 28 June 2020, he earned second place in the first round of the 2020 Polish presidential election, winning 30.46% of the votes, and advanced to the second round, which took place on 12 July 2020. In the second round of voting, Trzaskowski won 48.97% of the votes, losing the election to the incumbent Andrzej Duda, who won 51.03% of the votes.

=== Wspólna Polska movement ===
On 17 October 2020, Trzaskowski inaugurated what he termed as "a social and civic movement" named "Wspólna Polska". A part of it, called "New Solidarity", was to be a trade union for the self-employed and those working on term contracts. Around 11,000 members registered within days of the announcement. As of May 2023, the movement's website has not been updated since May 2021, and as of July 2023, it has been taken down altogether. The movement's Twitter account has not been active since December 2021.

=== 2025 presidential campaign ===
On 22 November 2024, he was chosen in a primary by the Civic Platform party to be their candidate for Presidency of Poland to stand in the 2025 Polish presidential election, defeating foreign minister Radosław Sikorski after winning 75% of the vote. He finished first in the first round held on 18 May 2025 with 31.36% of the vote, and faced PiS candidate Karol Nawrocki in a runoff on 1 June 2025, where he lost, with Nawrocki winning 50.89% of the vote.

== Political positions ==
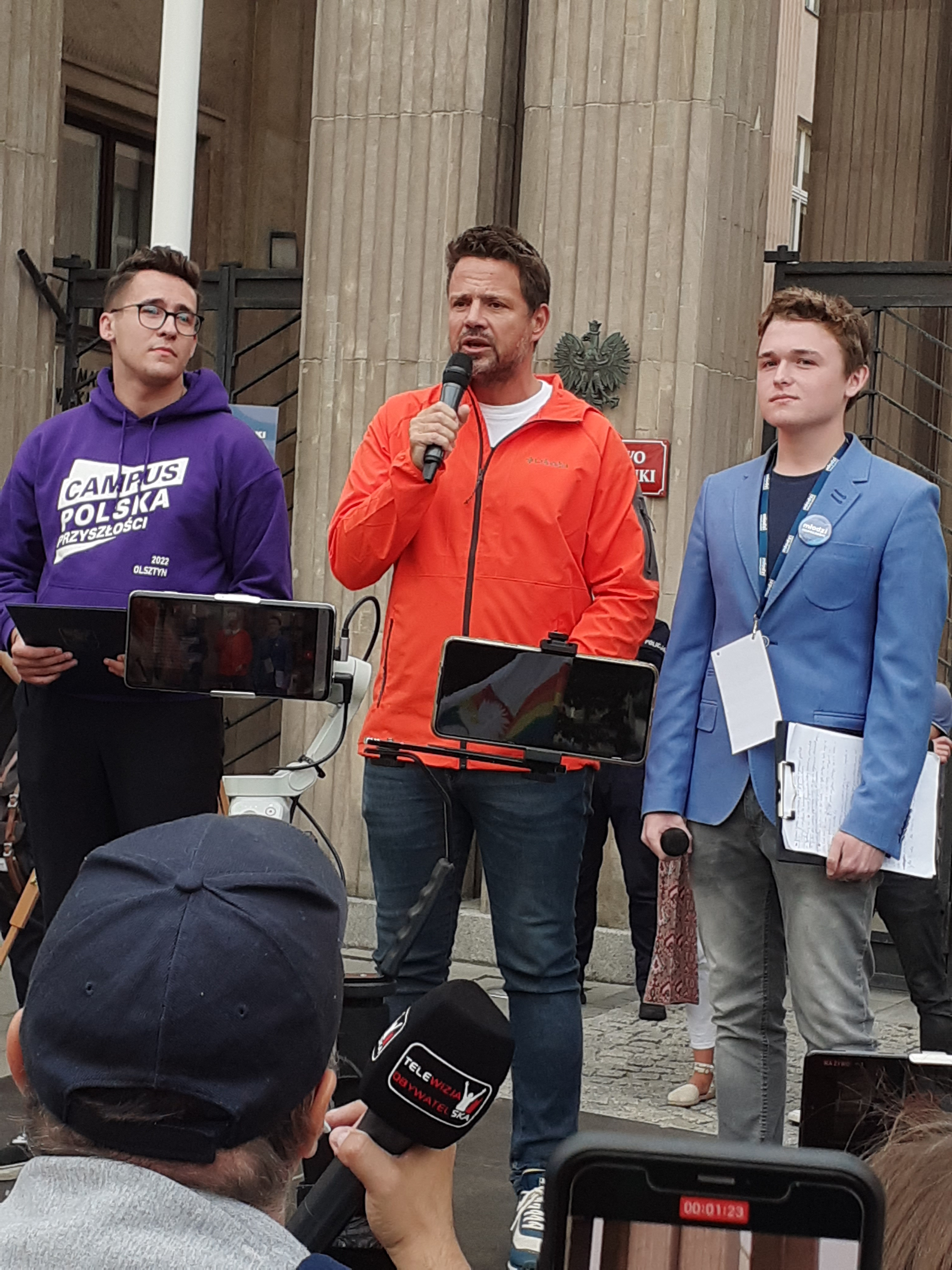
Rafał Trzaskowski in 2022.

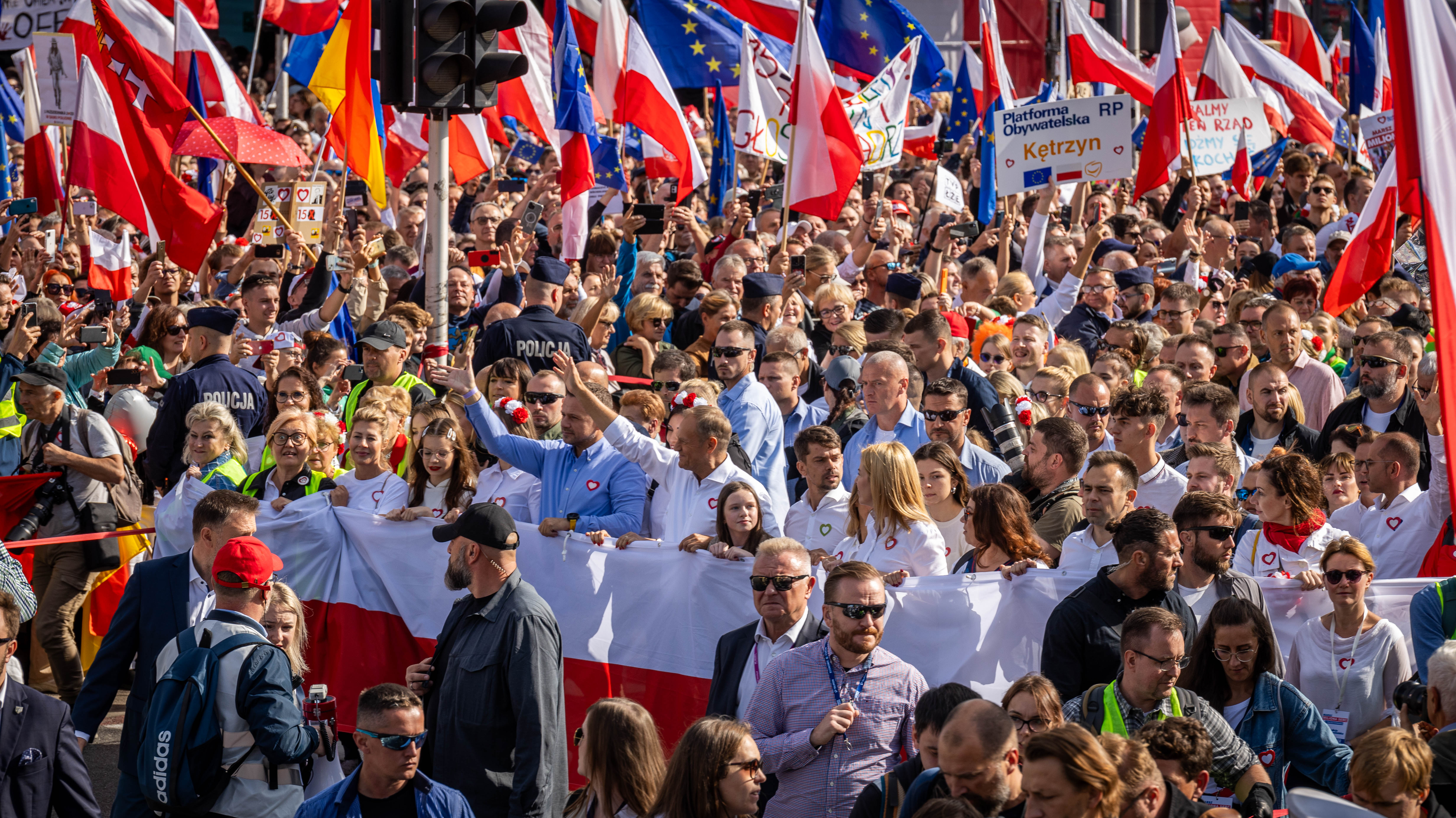
Trzaskowski, Donald Tusk and Michał Kołodziejczak at anti-government protests in Warsaw, 1 October 2023

He self-identifies as a centrist, and has been described as liberal-conservative, while his opponents view him as a liberal progressive. France24 wrote that Trzaskowski represents "neoliberal, urban and pro-European moderation". He supports European integration, Ukraine in the Russo-Ukrainian War, ecological restoration, moderately culturally liberal values, free-market liberalism, and a greater role for local governments in voivodeships. In the 2025 presidential campaign, Trzaskowski shifted to the right, becoming "much more right-leaning" than he was previously known for. Since then, he has been described as centre-right.

Trzaskowski is known for his controversial decision to remove crosses from public buildings in Warsaw. Trzaskowski supports the introduction of same-sex civil unions, but stated that he would never support adoption rights for them. He distanced himself from LGBT causes in 2025, and stated that there are two genders. He supports restrictions on immigration in Poland, and proposed increased border guard patrols, suspension of asylum, and restricting benefits for immigrants in Poland. As president of Warsaw, he made the city a member of the C40 Cities Climate Leadership Group and joined the C40 initiative to reduce greenhouse gas emissions with measures such as removing diesel vehicles and limiting meat consumption. He later distanced himself from these policies, stating that C40 is not binding for Warsaw and that he would not pursue these policies.

On economics, Trzaskowski supports the 'deregulation task force' founded by the Tusk government and led by the entrepreneur Rafał Brzoska, and wants to accelerate the process of economic deregulation. He also supports lowering healthcare tax on entrepreneurs and cutting healthcare costs. He proposed to restrict social welfare to immigrants, making it apply only to those working and paying taxes in Poland. In the 2025 presidential election, he expressed openness to austerity policies and opposed increasing social spending. He also opposes regulating the cryptocurrency market in Poland. Trzaskowski voted against decreasing retirement age in 2017, but changed his view in 2025, stating that he does not support increasing the retirement age and would seek economic incentives to encourage working past retirement age instead.

== Other activities ==
- European Council on Foreign Relations (ECFR), Member of the Council
- New Pact for Europe, Member of the Advisory Group

== Personal life ==
He declares being Catholic and he said that he greatly admired Pope John Paul II.

He is married to Małgorzata, a graduate of Kraków University of Economics. They have two children: Aleksandra (born 2004) and Stanisław (born 2009).

== Awards and decorations ==
- Knight of the Legion of Honour (France, 2017)
- Order of Unity and Will (Ukraine, 2023)

== Publications ==
- Dynamika reformy systemu podejmowania decyzji w Unii Europejskiej, Wydawnictwo Prawo i Praktyka Gospodarcza, Warsaw 2004
- Polityczne podstawy rozszerzenia UE, Wydawnictwo Natolin, Warsaw 1997
- Przyszły Traktat konstytucyjny. Granice kompromisu w dziedzinie podejmowania decyzji większością kwalifikowaną (co-written with Jan Barcz), Wydawnictwo Prawo i Praktyka Gospodarcza, Warsaw 2004

== Electoral results ==
Year	Office		Party	Constituency	Primary			Secondary			Result	Ref.
Year	Office		Party	Constituency	Total	%	P.	Total	%	P.	Result	Ref.
2009	European Parliament	7th	Civic Platform	No. 4	25,178	3.04	5th	—N/a			Won	
2015	Sejm of Poland	8th	Civic Platform	No. 13	47,080	8.67	2nd	—N/a			Won	
2018	Mayor of Warsaw	47th	Civic Coalition	—N/a	505,187	56.67	1st	—N/a			Won	
2020	President of Poland	6th	Civic Coalition	—N/a	5,917,340	30.46	2nd	10,018,263	48.97	2nd	Lost	
2024	Mayor of Warsaw	48th	Civic Coalition	—N/a	444,006	57.41	1st	—N/a			Won	
2025	President of Poland	7th	Civic Coalition	—N/a	6,147,797	31.36	1st	10,237,286	49.11	2nd	Lost	

== Trust rankings ==
Over the years of Trzaskowski's active political career, polling was conducted to gauge trust in his job as a politician.

Date(s) conducted	Polling firm/Link	Sample size	Trust	Distrust	Indifferent	Don't know/Neutral	Net trust	Place
19–21 Jun 2026	IBRiS / Onet	1,100	32.5	60.7	6.8	0.0	–28.2	7th
7–17 May 2026	CBOS	1,041	40	39	15	5	1	4th
9–19 Apr 2026	CBOS	944	45	37	11	7	8	4th
5–15 Mar 2026	CBOS	1,012	43	41	12	5	2	4th

Political offices
Preceded by Michał Boni	Minister of Administration and Digitization; 2013–2014	Succeeded by Andrzej Halicki
Preceded by Hanna Gronkiewicz-Waltz	Mayor of Warsaw; 2018–present	Incumbent
