= Anna Streżyńska =

Polish politician (born 1967)

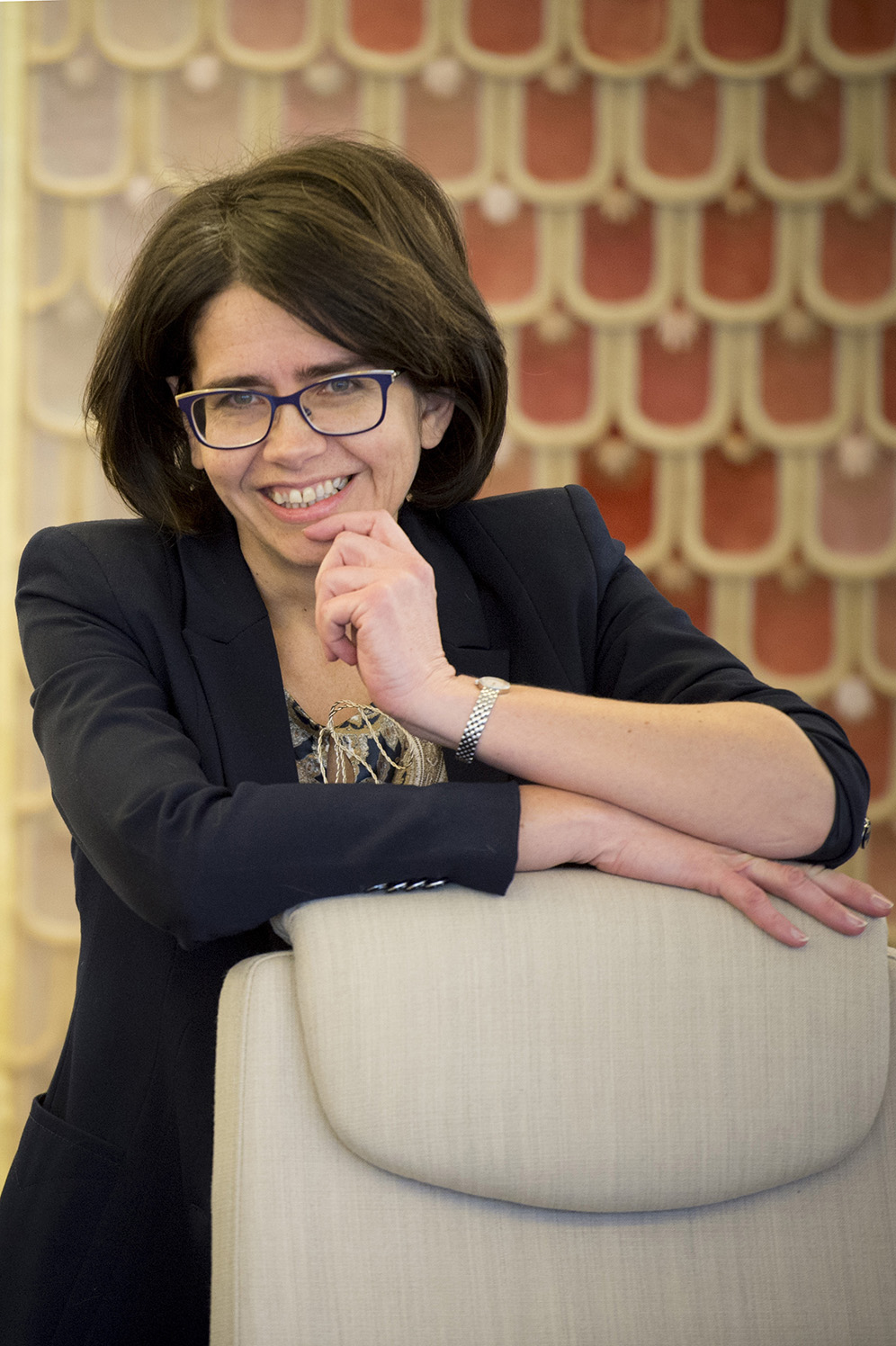

Minister of Digital Affairs
- In office 16 November 2015 – 9 January 2018
- Prime Minister: Beata Szydło; Mateusz Morawiecki
- Preceded by: Andrzej Halicki
- Succeeded by: Marek Zagórski

Personal details
- Born: 11 May 1967 (age 59) Warsaw, Poland
- Education: Faculty of Law and Administration of University of Warsaw

Anna Maria Streżyńska (née Bajorek) (born 11 May 1967 in Warsaw, Poland) is a Polish politician. She was the Polish Minister of Digital Affairs between 16 November 2015 and 9 January 2018. Prior to becoming a government member, she was a senior adviser in the Ministry.

Streżyńska worked as a civil servant in telecoms and competition policy for much of her career. In 2017, she refused Deputy Prime Minister and Minister of Science and Higher Education Jarosław Gowin’s offer to join a newly formed “Christian Democratic” party titled “Porozumienie.”

On 9 January 2018 Streżyńska was recalled from the office of the Minister of Digital Affairs.
