= Andrzej Halicki =

Polish politician (born 1961)

Andrzej Halicki MEP
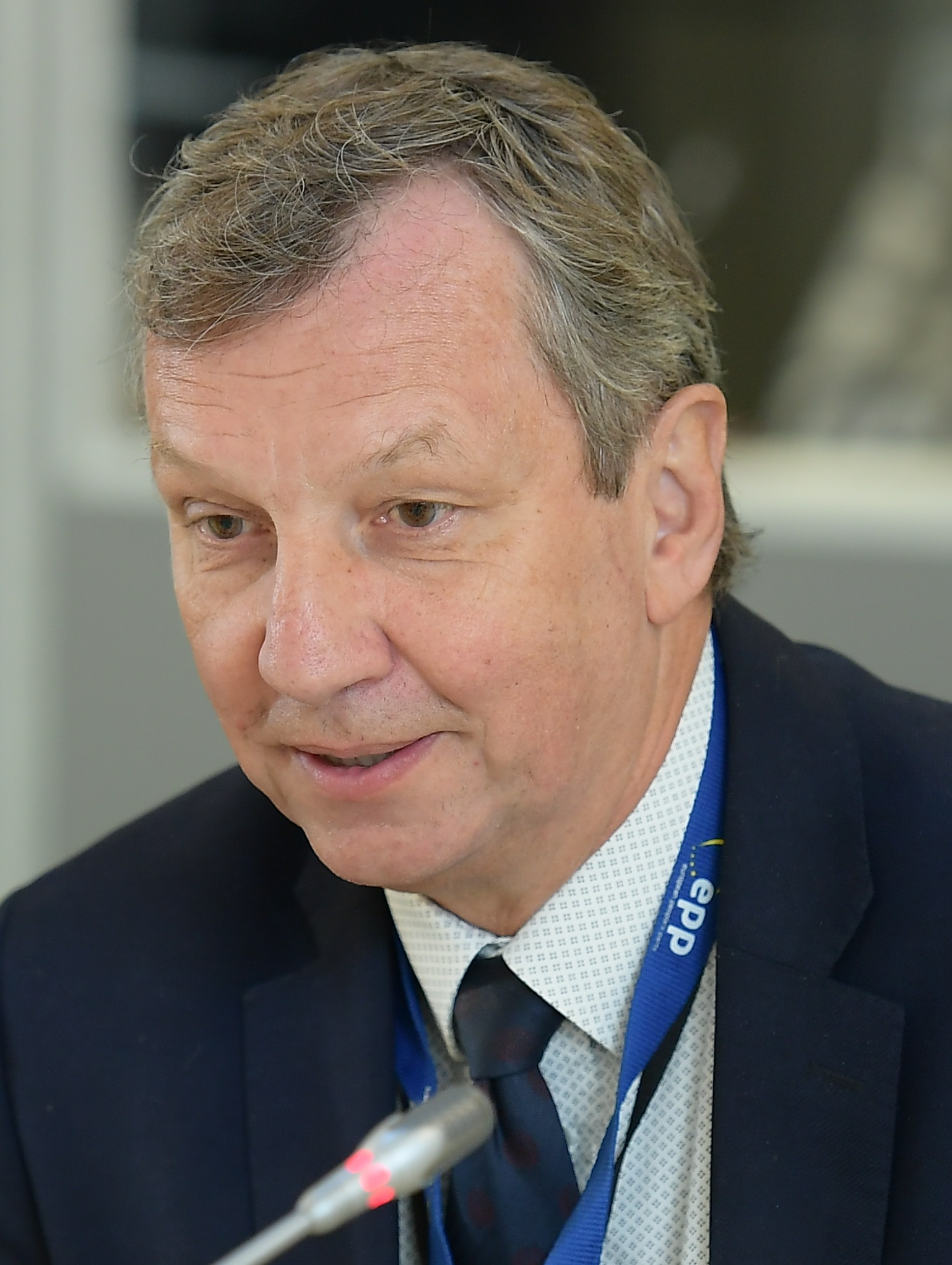
- Halicki in 2023

Vice-Chair of the European People's Party in the European Parliament
- Incumbent
- Assumed office 19 June 2024
- Chair: Manfred Weber
- Serving alongside: François-Xavier Bellamy; Jeroen Lenaers; Dolors Montserrat; Siegfried Mureșan; Lídia Pereira; Massimiliano Salini; Tomas Tobé; Romana Tomc; Željana Zovko
- Preceded by: See list: Arnaud Danjean; Frances Fitzgerald; Rasa Juknevičienė; Jeroen Lenaers; Vangelis Meimarakis; Dolors Montserrat; Siegfried Mureşan; Jan Olbrycht; Željana Zovko; Lídia Pereira

Minister of Administration and Digitization
- In office 22 September 2014 – 16 November 2015
- President: Bronisław Komorowski; Andrzej Duda
- Prime Minister: Ewa Kopacz
- Preceded by: Rafał Trzaskowski
- Succeeded by: Mariusz Błaszczak (Administration); Anna Streżyńska (Digitization)

Personal details
- Born: 26 November 1961 (age 64)
- Party: Civic Platform
- Education: SGH Warsaw School of Economics

Andrzej Witold Halicki (born 26 November 1961) is a Polish politician of the Civic Platform (PO) who has been serving as a Member of the European Parliament since the 2019 elections.

== Political career ==
=== Career in national politics ===
Halicki joined the PO in 2001.

On 10 January 2007, Halicki replaced Jacek Wojciechowicz as member of the Sejm. In the 2007 parliamentary elections, he was elected to parliament for the second time, receiving 3,369 votes in the Warsaw constituency. On 24 June 2009 he became chairman of the Committee on Foreign Affairs, replacing Krzysztof Lisek. In October 2009, he became the spokesman of the PO parliamentary group, a position he held for a year. In May 2010, he was elected chairman of the PO in the Mazovia region. In the 2011 elections he successfully ran for re-election in the Warsaw constituency, receiving 40,002 votes.

From September 2014 until November 2015, Halicki briefly served as Minister of Administration and Digitization in the government of Prime Minister Ewa Kopacz. During his time in office, he oversaw efforts ley by the country’s telecoms regulator UKE on an auction for mobile broadband frequencies.

In addition to his role in parliament, Halicki was as a member of the Polish delegation to the Parliamentary Assembly of the Council of Europe from 2012 until 2019. During that time, he served as Vice-President of the Assembly from 2012 to 2014, under the leadership of President Jean-Claude Mignon.

=== Member of the European Parliament, 2019–present ===
In parliament, Halicki has been serving on the Committee on Civil Liberties, Justice and Home Affairs (since 2019) and the Committee on Foreign Affairs (since 2021). In addition to his committee assignments, he is part of the parliament's delegation to the Euronest Parliamentary Assembly.

== Political positions ==
In 2021, Halicki called on the European Union to follow Britain's example and impose new anti-corruption sanctions on Russians suspected of fraud and graft.
