= Krzysztof Gawkowski =

Deputy Prime Minister of Poland since December 2023

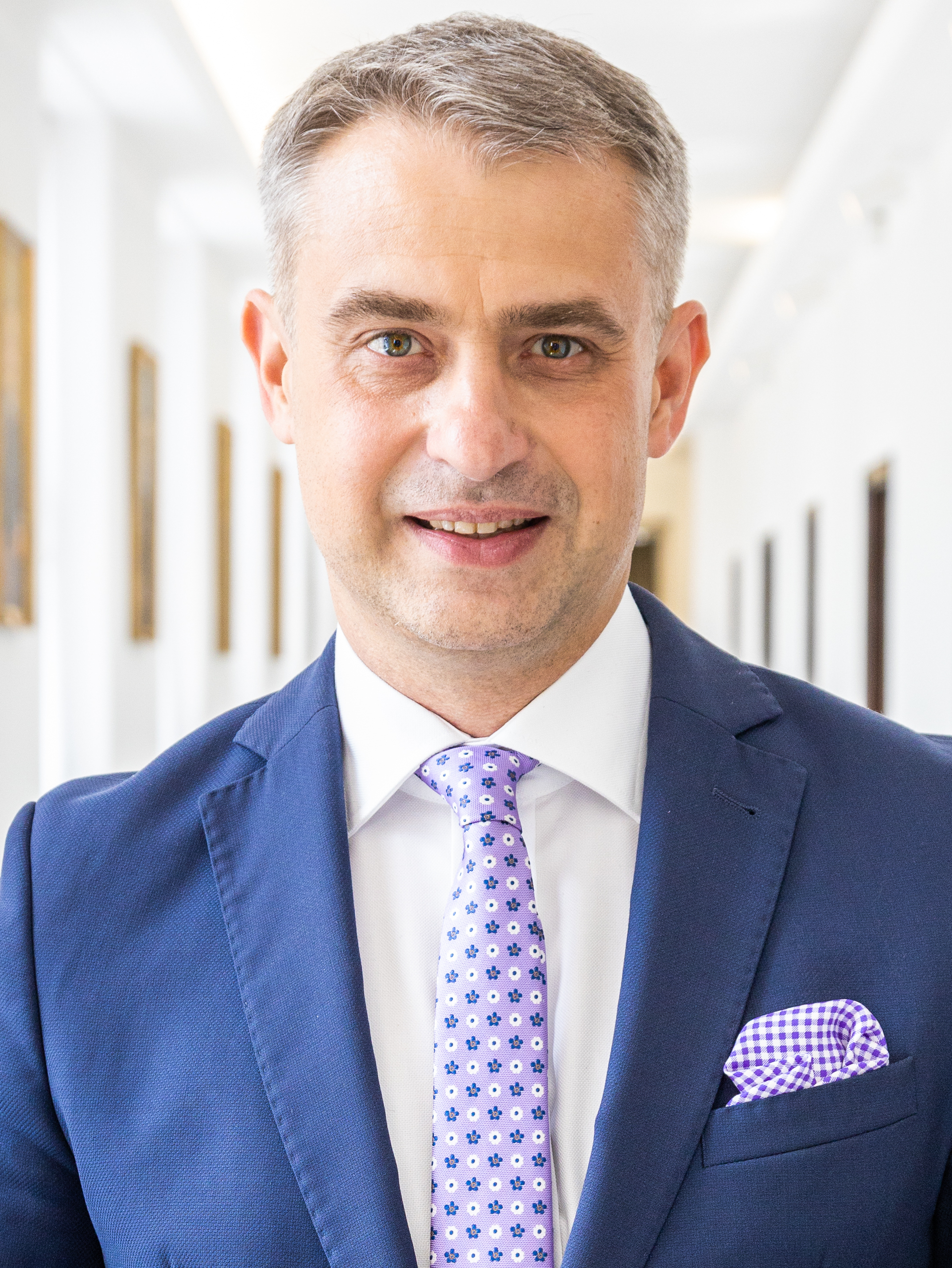
- Gawkowski in 2022

Deputy Prime Minister of Poland
- Incumbent
- Assumed office 13 December 2023 Serving with Władysław Kosiniak-Kamysz and Radosław Sikorski
- Prime Minister: Donald Tusk
- Preceded by: Jarosław Kaczyński

Minister of Digital Affairs
- Incumbent
- Assumed office 13 December 2023
- Prime Minister: Donald Tusk
- Preceded by: Janusz Cieszyński

Leader of The Left Parliamentary Club
- In office 12 November 2019 – 12 December 2023
- Preceded by: Leszek Miller
- Succeeded by: Anna Maria Żukowska

Member of the Sejm
- Incumbent
- Assumed office 12 November 2019
- Constituency: 4 - Bydgoszcz

Personal details
- Born: 11 April 1980 (age 46) Warsaw, Poland
- Party: The Left (2019–present); New Left (2021–present)
- Other political affiliations: Democratic Left Alliance (2000–2018); Spring (2019–2021)

Krzysztof Kamil Gawkowski (born 11 April 1980) is a Polish politician, political scientist and writer. Member of the Sejm for the 9th and 10th parliamentary term, chairman of The Left's parliamentary club (2019-2023), vice-chairman of New Left (from 2021), from 2023 Deputy Prime Minister of Poland and Minister of Digital Affairs in Donald Tusk's third cabinet.

== Early life and education ==
Gawkowski grew up in Wołomin, Poland. He graduated from a railway technical school. Early in his career, he worked at Jarmark Europa in Warsaw before running his own advertising company.

He pursued legal studies at the University of Warsaw, though he did not complete the program. In 2006, he earned a master’s degree in political science from the Higher School of Communication and Social Media in Warsaw. Between 2007 and 2008, he served as an academic instructor, teaching administrative law at the Higher School of Security and Protection in Warsaw.

In 2011, he was awarded a PhD degree in political science by the Aleksander Gieysztor Academy of Humanities in Pułtusk. His doctoral thesis, titled Electoral Law for Local Self-Government in the Third Republic of Poland Against the European Background, was supervised by Leszek Moczulski. Following this, he joined the faculty of the Helena Chodkowska University of Technology and Commerce in Warsaw as an assistant professor.

He declares he is a Catholic.

== Politics ==
As a teenager in the 1990s he was a member of the Young Social Democrats Federation., and at 20, he joined the social-democratic Democratic Left Alliance (SLD), then one of the largest parties in Poland. In 2002 and 2004 he was a councillor in the town of Wołomin, near Warsaw. At the 2010 Polish local elections he was elected at the Masovian Regional Assembly for SLD. The next year he was a candidate for Parliament (Sejm).

In 2016 he was appointed as co-leader of the Democratic Left Alliance. However, after almost twenty years he gave up his affiliation with the Alliance.

In 2019, Gawkowski started to cooperate with Robert Biedroń who headed the newly founded left-wing party Spring. In May he was a candidate to the European Parliament on the Spring list but was not one of the 3 left-wing candidates elected. However, in October of the same year, he was a candidate to the Sejm for the Bydgoszcz constituency in the North-West in the joint electoral alliance The Left between Spring and the SLD, and was elected (see List of 9th term Sejm MPs). He was appointed Leader of the parliamentary club dominated by a majority of SLD MPs, thereby more or less returning to the tent of his old party. In 2021 Spring and SLD merged into the new party New Left.

In the 2023 parliamentary elections he successfully ran for re-election after he received 21,831 votes.

As the two leaders of the party, Włodzimierz Czarzasty and Robert Biedroń, served as Deputy Marshal of the Sejm and European Parliament member, Gawkowski was appointed on 13 December 2023 as Deputy Prime Minister and Minister of Digital Affairs by Prime Minister Donald Tusk, representing the highest position for his party in Tusk's government.

== Writer ==
He has written a few poetic and academic books.

=== Poetry ===
- "Cień Przeszłości", Warszawska Firma Wydawnicza, Warszawa 2018, ISBN 978-83-7805-359-0
- "Piętno prawdy", Warszawska Firma Wydawnicza, Warszawa 2010, ISBN 978-83-61748-44-1

=== Academic books ===
- "Obudzić państwo", Warszawska Firma Wydawnicza, Warszawa 2015, ISBN 978-83-7805-339-2
- "Cyberkolonializm", Helion, Gliwice 2018, ISBN 978-83-283-4801-1
- "Administracja samorządowa w teorii i praktyce", Wydawnictwo Adam Marszałek, Toruń 2017, ISBN 978-83-8019-757-2
