= Ministry of Administration and Digitization (Poland) =

Government ministry of Poland (2011–2015)

- Ministerstwo Administracji i Cyfryzacji
- Official governmental wall plaque

Agency overview
- Formed: November 21, 2011
- Dissolved: November 16, 2015
- Headquarters: ul. Królewska 27, Warsaw
- Agency executive: Andrzej Halicki, Minister of Administration and Digitization; First Deputy Minister
- Parent agency: Council of Ministers
- Website: www.mac.gov.pl

The Ministry of Administration and Digitization (Polish: Ministerstwo Administracji i Cyfryzacji) was formed on 21 November 2011, from a reorganisation of the Ministry of Infrastructure and the Ministry of Interior and Administration.

The Ministry was disbanded on 16 November 2015 based on the regulation of the Council of Ministers and partially superseded by the Ministry of Digital Affairs.

The ministry was concerned with various aspects of administration, Internet and telecommunication in Poland.

The last minister was Andrzej Halicki.

The Ministry used to oversee:

- the Office of Electronic Communication (Urząd Komunikacji Elektronicznej)
- Chief Country Geodesist (Główny Geodeta Kraju)

== Ministers (2011–2015) ==
Portrait	Name	Party	Term of Office		Prime minister (Cabinet)
	Michał Boni	Nonpartisanism	18 November 2011	27 November 2013	Donald Tusk (Tusk II)
	Rafał Trzaskowski	Civic Platform	3 December 2013	22 September 2014	Donald Tusk (Tusk II)
	Andrzej Halicki	Civic Platform	22 September 2014	16 November 2015	Ewa Kopacz (Kopacz)
