= Ministry of Digital Affairs =

Government ministry of Poland

- Ministerstwo Cyfryzacji
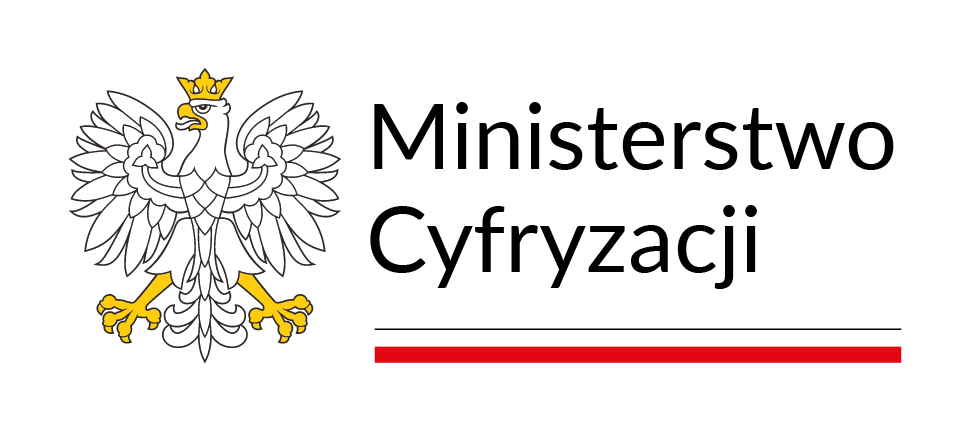

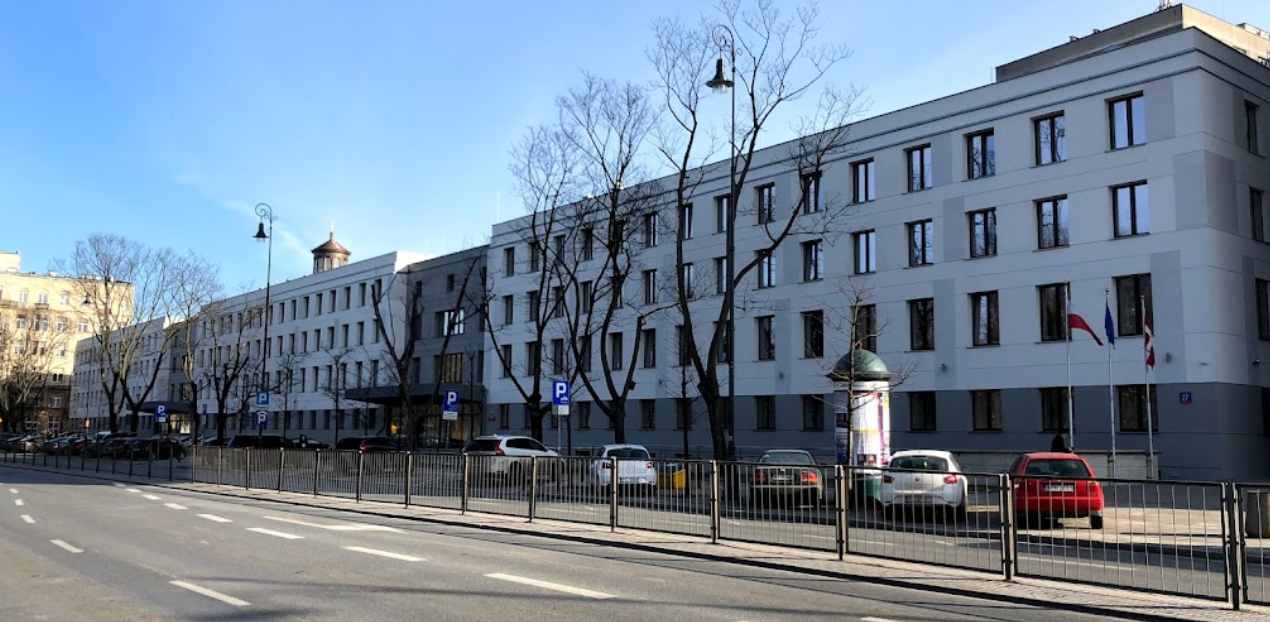

Agency overview
- Formed: 7 December 2015, 1 May 2023
- Preceding agency: Ministry of Administration and Digitization
- Dissolved: 7 October 2020
- Jurisdiction: Republic of Poland
- Headquarters: ul. Królewska 27, Warsaw
- Agency executive: Krzysztof Gawkowski, Minister of Digital Affairs
- Parent department: Council of Ministers
- Child agencies: Center of Digital Administration; Digital Poland Projects Center
- Website: www.gov.pl

The Ministry of Digital Affairs (Polish: Ministerstwo Cyfryzacji) is a ministry of the Polish government founded in December 2015, dissolved in October 2020 and founded again in May 2023. Split from the Ministry of Administration and Digitization, the Ministry is responsible for matters regarding development in the cyber sphere for Poland. The first Minister of Digital Affairs was Anna Streżyńska. After she was recalled on 9 January 2018, the Ministry was under personal supervision of the Polish Prime Minister Mateusz Morawiecki until 17 April 2018 when Marek Zagórski was appointed the Minister of Digital Affairs. The ministry was made defunct in 2020 following a Council of Ministers decree. The Ministry is functioning again since 1 May 2023 following a Council of Ministers decree.

The current minister is Krzysztof Gawkowski, serving since 13 December 2023, serving concurrently as a Deputy Prime Minister, under Prime Minister Donald Tusk.

== Responsibilities ==
The Ministry of Digital Affairs is to develop infrastructure related to broadband, to support the creation of web content in Poland and electronic services. It is also promoting digital awareness among Polish citizens.

The Ministry is responsible for 8 departments and 4 bureaux.

== Departments ==
- Minister's Office provides parliamentary, governmental and protocol support for the minister and other members of leadership within the Ministry. The Office is also responsible for co-ordinating international trips and visits and helps to organise European and international events relating to Digital Affairs. It is also liaising with other EU institutions and international organisations. The Office also providing analytical and communications to support other departments in the Ministry. It is also was responsible for all co-ordination of internet and social media communications with the public.
- Department of Telecommunication is responsible for legal matters relating to telecommunication and the development of networks and services. It is also responsible for the execution and implementation of the Polish National Broadband Plan.
- Department of Data Management
- Department of Cyber Security
- Department of Projects and Strategy
- Department of Digital Transformation
- Department of Innovation and Technology
- Center for Digital Skills Development
- Communications Bureau
- Administration Bureau
- Financial-Budget Bureau
