= Michał Boni =

Polish politician (born 1954)

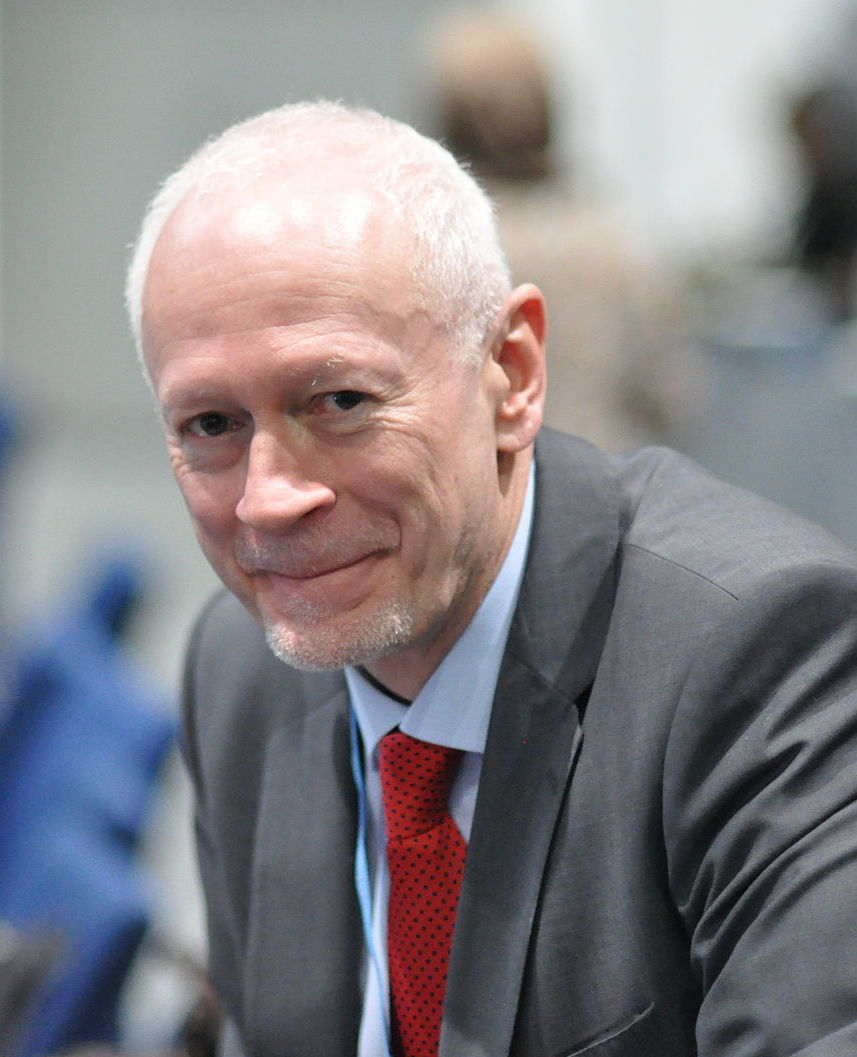
Portrait of Boni, 2012

Michał Jan Boni (born 1954 in Poznań) is a Polish politician. He was the Minister of Labour and Social Policy in 1991 and a deputy to the Polish Sejm from 1991 to 1993. He was a member of the Cabinet of Poland from 2009 and was Minister of Administration and Digitization from November 2011 to November 2013. He was elected in 2014 and served as an MEP from the Warsaw region until 2019, when he was not re-elected.

As of February 2021 Boni serves as a member of the Consultative Council of the Polish Women's Strike and the Supervisory Board of the Open Dialogue Foundation.
