= Marek Zagórski =

Polish politician and journalist

Marek Tadeusz Zagórski
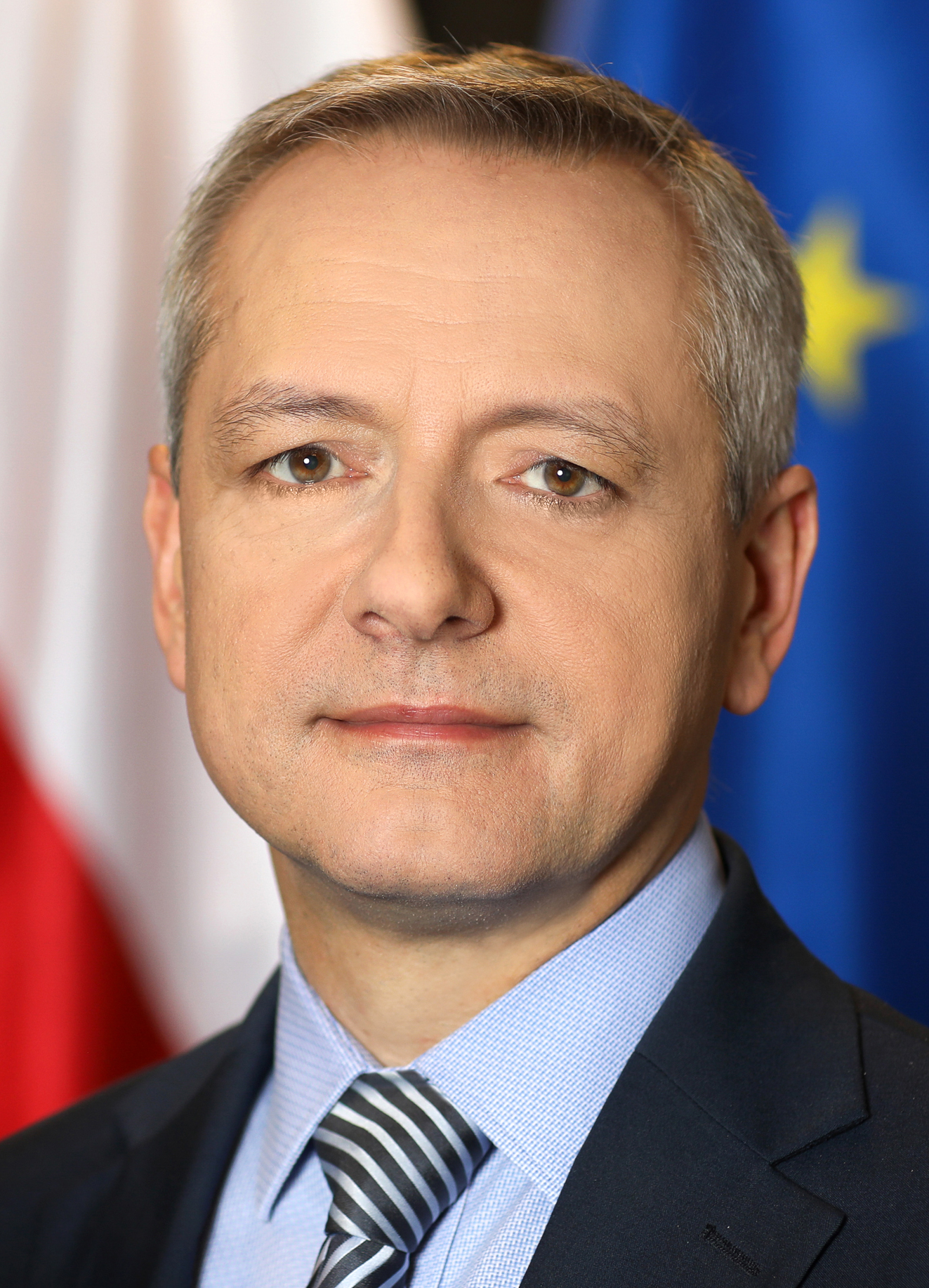
- Marek Zagórski (2019)

Secretary of State in the Chancellery of the Prime Minister
- In office 7 October 2020 – 7 June 2021
- Prime Minister: Mateusz Morawiecki

Minister of Digital Affairs
- In office 17 April 2018 – 6 October 2020
- Prime Minister: Mateusz Morawiecki
- Preceded by: Anna Streżyńska
- Succeeded by: Mateusz Morawiecki

Secretary of State in the Ministry of Digital Affairs
- In office 15 September 2016 – 17 April 2018
- Prime Minister: Beata Szydło

Secretary of State in the Ministry of State Assets
- In office 7 December 2015 – 14 September 2016
- Prime Minister: Beata Szydło

Secretary of State in the Ministry of Agriculture and Rural Development
- In office 8 May 2006 – 10 May 2007
- Prime Minister: Jarosław Kaczyński

Personal details
- Born: August 6, 1967 (age 58) Kamień Pomorski, Poland
- Party: Law and Justice

Marek Tadeusz Zagórski (born August 6, 1967, in Kamień Pomorski, Poland) is a Polish politician and journalist. He served as a member of the Sejm (the lower house of the Polish parliament) in the IV, VIII, and IX terms.

== Biography ==
=== Education and career ===
In 1993, he graduated from the Faculty of Humanities at the University of Szczecin. In 1997, he completed a course in modern financial management at the French Institute of Management, and in 2001, he completed postgraduate studies in banking and finance at the Warsaw University of Life Sciences.

From 1991 to 1993, he was the editor-in-chief of the weekly magazine "Punkt Widzenia." In 1993, he worked at the "Morze i Ziemia" Publishing House as the head of the distribution department. From 1993 to 1995, he was the editor-in-chief of the cable TV station TV Gryfnet in Szczecin. From 1995 to 1998, he was the president of the Management Board of Pomorska Stacja Radiowa. In 1998, he worked at the City Hall in Szczecin as the plenipotentiary of the mayor. In 1999, he was the deputy director of a team at the Agency for Restructuring and Modernization of Agriculture. In 2005, he began working as the president of the Management Board of the commercial company "Poręczenia Kredytowe," and later, from 2009, he was the president of the Management Board of the European Rural Development Fund.

=== Political career ===
From 1993 to 1997, he was a member of the Conservative Party, and from 1997 to the Conservative People's Party. He led the political cabinet of Minister of Agriculture and Rural Development Artur Balazs from 1999 to 2001. In the 2001 elections, he was elected as a member of parliament from the Białystok district on the Civic Platform list. He did not join the Civic Platform Parliamentary group but became part of a parliamentary circle formed by the Conservative People's Party. He was an independent member of parliament from 2004 and did not seek re-election in 2005.

In 2006, he became Secretary of State in the Ministry of Agriculture and Rural Development, resigning in 2007. He played a role in reactivating the Conservative People's Party in 2009 and became its president. He supported Bronisław Komorowski in the 2010 presidential elections and joined Law and Justice in 2014. In 2015, he was elected as a member of parliament from the Siedlce district on the Law and Justice list and became Secretary of State in the Ministry of the Treasury. He later served as Secretary of State in the Ministry of Digital Affairs. In 2018, he was appointed Minister of Digital Affairs and successfully ran for re-election in 2019.

He concluded his ministerial term in 2020 and served as Secretary of State in the Chancellery of the Prime Minister until 2021. He resigned from his parliamentary mandate in 2023 and became the president of the Management Board of the National Food Group in April of the same year.

== Bibliography ==
- Marek Zagórski
