= Jan Stanisław Bury =

Polish politician

Jan Stanisław Bury Ph.D.
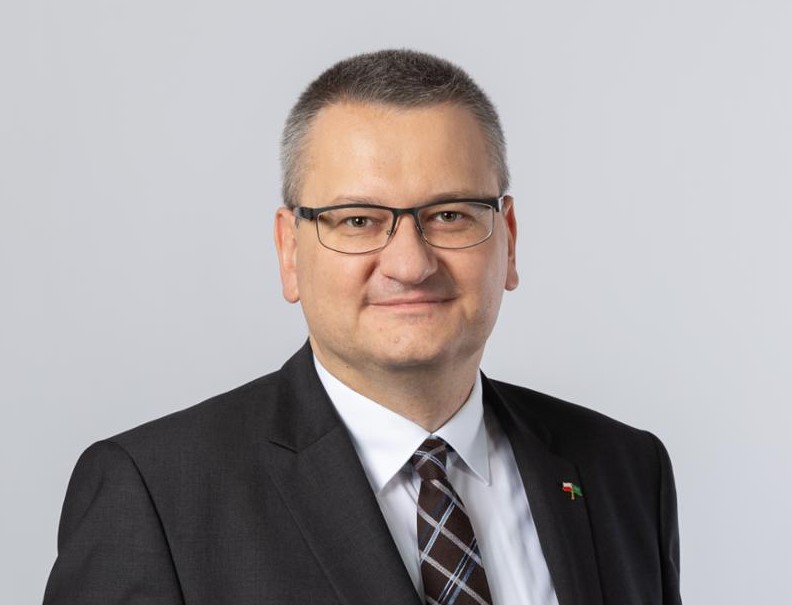

4th Poland Ambassador to Saudi Arabia
- In office 2017 – 31 May 2022
- Preceded by: Witold Śmidowski
- Succeeded by: Robert Rostek

Personal details
- Born: 1977 (age 48–49)
- Children: 2
- Education: University of Warsaw
- Profession: Diplomat, political scientist

Jan Stanisław Bury (born 1977) is a Polish political scientist and diplomat. Between 2018 and 2022 he served as an ambassador to Saudi Arabia.

== Life ==
=== Education ===
Jan Stanisław Bury was born in 1977. In 2002 he has earned his master's degree from the University of Warsaw, Faculty of Oriental Studies. In 2006 he defended there his Ph.D. thesis on criminal procedure in Medieval Arabic literature. He was also educated at the universities in Kuwait, Tunis, Oxford, and Nijmegen.

=== Career ===
He began his professional career in 2005 at the Polish Institute of International Affairs (PISM) as a Middle East analyst. Following his work at PISM, in 2008 he joined the academia.

Between 2008 and 2017 he was an assistant professor at the Institute of International Law, European Law and International Relations of the Faculty of Law and Administration of the Cardinal Stefan Wyszynski University in Warsaw. He has been giving lectures also at the University of Warsaw, Collegium Civitas and PISM Diplomatic Academy. As a researcher, he has published ca 100 publishes on international relations in the contemporary Arab World and international security.

In December 2017, Jan S. Bury was nominated Poland ambassador to Saudi Arabia. He was accredited also to Oman and Yemen. He ended his term on 31 May 2022.

He speaks English, Arabic, Spanish, Hebrew and Russian languages. He is married, with two children.

== Works ==
- Prawo karne islamu, Warszawa 2007 (with Jerzy W. Kasprzak).
- Polish codebreaking during the Russo-Polish war of 1919–1920, West Point 2004.
- The UN Iraq-Kuwait Observation Mission, London 2003.
