= Adam Krzymowski =

Polish political scientist and diplomat (born 1973)

- Adam Krzymowski at the UN headquarters, New York, 2023

3rd Poland Ambassador to the United Arab Emirates
- In office 2 March 2011 – 31 July 2015
- Preceded by: Roman Chałaczkiewicz
- Succeeded by: Robert Rostek

Personal details
- Born: 6 November 1973 (age 52) Białystok, Poland
- Children: 4
- Education: University of Warsaw
- Profession: Political scientist, Diplomat
- Website: adamkrzymowski.org

Adam Krzymowski (born 6 November 1973) is a Polish political scientist and diplomat, Ambassador of Poland to the United Arab Emirates, 2011–2015. Currently, professor (Full) at Zayed University.

== Education ==
In 1998, he graduated with distinction at the Faculty of Political Science of the Maria Curie-Skłodowska University in Lublin. In 2000 he completed the Postgraduate National Security Studies organized by the Ministry of National Defense, the National Security Bureau and the University of Warsaw. In 2002, he presented at the University of Warsaw written under the direction of Stanisław Parzymies the doctoral dissertation "United States of America and the European Security and Defense Identity" for which he obtained a doctoral degree in political science.

== Career ==
Krzymowski participated in the strategic processes concerning Poland's membership in the European Union, the North Atlantic Treaty Organization, and the Middle East. From 1998 to 2008, he worked at the Office of the Committee of European Integration, where he rose through the ranks to become the Chief Specialist.

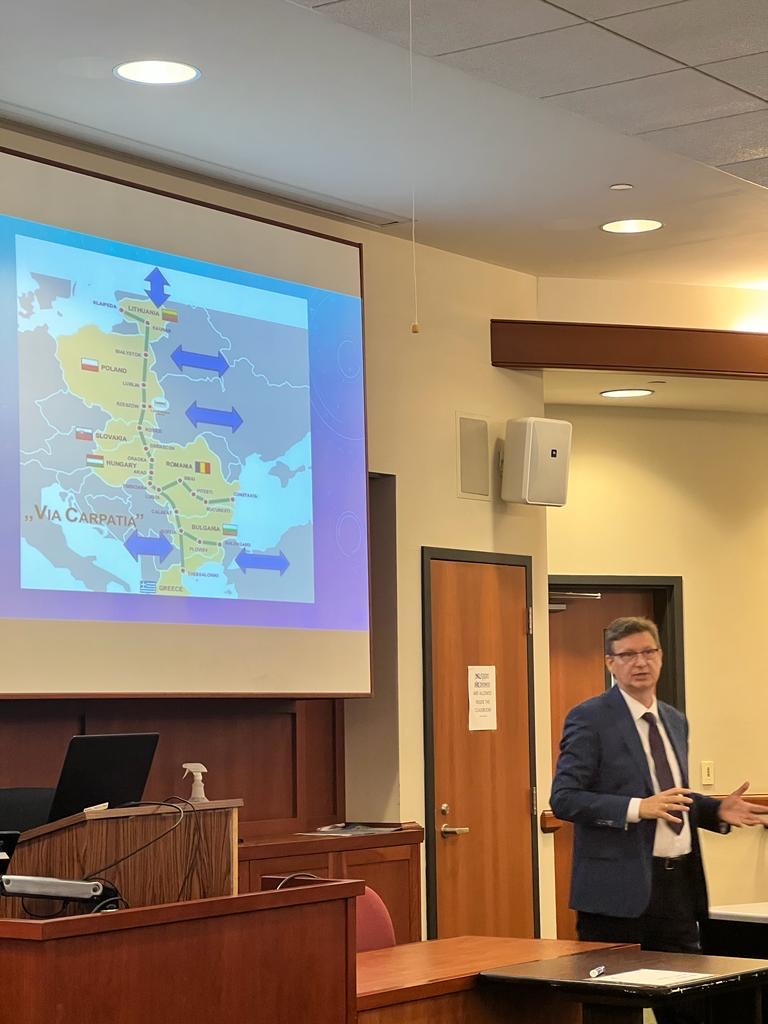
Adam Krzymowski at University of Delaware, Newark, 2023

In these time, he participated in several conferences, including on the Future of North Atlantic Security Strategic Imperatives, on the invitation of NATO Supreme Allied Commander Atlantic (2000, Reykjavik); European Armament Industries, ESDP, and Transatlantic Cooperation (2001, Paris); the EU and NATO-Practical Progress and Prospects, on the invitation of the Royal Institute of International Affairs (2001, London); Atlantic Partner or Regional Player? Europe's Security and Defence Policy after 11 September (2001, Paris); the Common Foreign and Security Policy of the EU, (2001, Paris); NATO's Research & Technology Organization on Real-Time Intrusion Detection, (2002, Estoril); Dual Enlargement: Security Policy Implications (2004, Tallinn); Economic Dimensions of Defence Institutions (2004, Berlin), both on the invitation of the George C. Marshall European Centre for Security Studies. From 2006 to 2007, he was a member of the Governmental Team for the National Security Strategy of Poland.

In the years 2008–2015, he worked at the Chancellery of the Prime Minister of Poland in the Office of the Prime Minister's Plenipotentiary for International Dialogue., where he was promoted to the position of Counsellor to the Prime Minister. In 2008, he represented his country in the first governmental-parliamentary delegation to the European Space Agency in Paris, leading Poland to join that organisation.

From 2 March 2011 to 31 July 2015, he was the Ambassador of the Republic of Poland in the United Arab Emirates and a representative at the International Renewable Energy Agency. Among other things, Adam Krzymowski contributed to the opening of direct flights between Poland and the UAE, and the historic first visit of a member of the royal family, UAE Minister of Foreign Affairs to Poland (May 2011); Deputy Prime Minister, Minister of Economy of Poland to the UAE (January 2012); Prime Minister of Poland to the UAE (April 2012); UAE Minister of Economy to Poland (February 2012); President of Poland to the UAE (December 2013); member of the royal family, UAE Minister of Foreign Affairs to Poland (June 2014); Deputy Prime Minister, Minister of Economy of Poland to the UAE (April 2015); to the historic first visit of the Vice President, Prime Minister and Ruler of Dubai to Poland (June 2015), who, in addition to meeting with the President of Poland, met with the President-elect, for whom it was his first official meeting with a foreign leader. Adam Krzymowski also contributed to establishing and holding the first meeting of the Joint Economic Committee (February 2013) and another one, which took place in 2015. During his term as Ambassador, trade exchange increased from US$316 million to US$1.3 billion.

Moreover, as the Ambassador, he participated in the EU-GCC Joint Council and the International Contact Group for Libya (2011), headed the Polish delegation to the first meeting of the International Working Group on Economic Recovery and Development of the Friends of the Syrian People (2012), participated in the International Contact Group on Afghanistan (2012), was the head of the Polish delegation at the Proliferation Security Initiative meeting (2013), represented Poland at the International Conference on Countering Piracy (2014), was the head of the Polish delegation at the International Contact Group on Afghanistan (2015).

After his Ambassador's mission, in early 2016, he assumed the post of Senior Advisor to the Director General of the Expo 2020 Dubai. He became a Board of Trustees member of the Strategic Advisory Centre for Economic and Future Studies in Abu Dhabi. Since early 2020, he has been a professor at Zayed University and since 2021, a member of the Oxford Network of Peace Studies at the University of Oxford. In 2023, Krzymowski completed the Study of the U.S. Institutes for Global Scholars on U.S. Foreign Policy. As part of it, he had research activities at various universities, including the University of Delaware, Yale University, the University of Pennsylvania, George Washington University, and the U.S. Naval Academy.

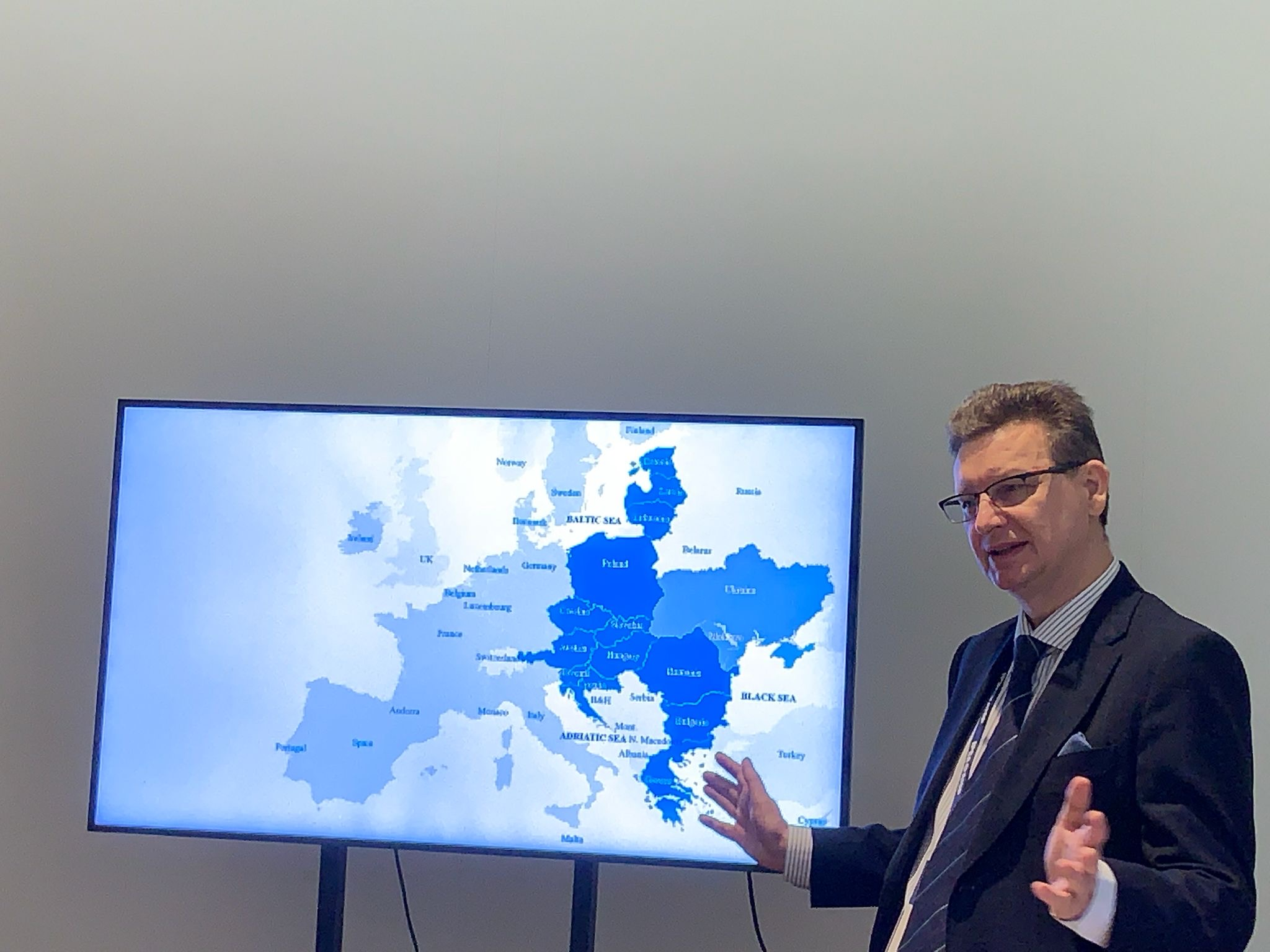
Adam Krzymowski, Paper Author and Oral Presenter at the 2025 IPSA World Congress of Political Science

As a professor, he has delivered lectures at various universities, including Sorbonne University and New York University in Abu Dhabi, the University of Sharjah (UAE), the London School of Economics and Political Science, the Diplomatic Academy of Vienna, the Chinese University of Hong Kong, and the Catholic University of Santa Maria (Peru). Krzymowski is also a prolific author of scholarly publications on various contemporary topics related to regional and global security policy issues, international political economy, and diplomacy in the emerging global era.

Since January 2024, he has been a member of the International Advisory Board of the Hung Research Center for Hong Kong and Globalization.

In July 2025, at the World Congress of Political Science in Seoul, South Korea, he presented a paper on "Central Eastern Europe - Three Seas Initiative and Gulf Cooperation Council Countries' Impact on Transatlantic, Indo-Pacific Grand Strategies and Changing World Order.

== Agreements Signed with His Involvement ==
2012:

- Agreement between the Government of the Republic of Poland and the Government of the UAE on Economic Cooperation.
- Agreement between the Government of the Republic of Poland and the Government of the UAE on the Abolition of the Visa Requirement for Holders of Diplomatic Passports.

2013:

- Memorandum of Understanding between the Polish Financial Supervision Authority (KNF) and the Emirates Securities and Commodities Authority(ESCA).
- Protocol of the 1 st Meeting of Poland – United Arab Emirates Joint Commission for Economic Cooperation.
- Memorandum of Understanding between General Authority of Youth and Sports Welfare of the United Arab Emirates and Ministry of Sport and Tourism of the Republic of Poland on sports cooperation.
- Letter of Intent between the Minister of the Interior of the Republic of Poland and the Minister of Defence of the United Arab Emirates on Cooperation in the Training of Border Guards.
- Protocol between the Government of the Republic of Poland and the Government of the United Arab Emirates Amending the Agreement between the Government of the Republic of Poland and the Government of the United Arab Emirates for the Avoidance of Double Taxation and the Prevention of Fiscal Evasion with Respect to Taxes on Income and Capital, signed at Abu Dhabi on 31 January 1993 and the Protocol, signed at Abu Dhabi on 31 January 1993.

2014:

- Memorandum of Understanding on Bilateral Political Consultations between the Ministry of Foreign Affairs of the Republic of Poland and the Ministry of Foreign Affairs of the United Arab Emirates.
- Memorandum of Understanding on Creation of a Joint Committee for Cooperation between the Government of the United Arab Emirates and the Government of the Republic of Poland.
- Agreement between the Government of the Republic of Poland and the Government of the United Arab Emirates on Maritime Transport (negotiated and prepared in 2014, signed in 2019).

2015:

- Protocol of the II Meeting of Poland – United Arab Emirates Joint Commission for Economic Cooperation.
- Memorandum of Understanding between the Government of the Republic of Poland and the Government of the United Arab Emirates Concerning Cooperation in the Field of Higher Education and Scientific Research.
- Agreement between the Government of the Republic of Poland and the Government of the United Arab Emirates on Cooperation in the Field of Tourism.
- Memorandum of Understanding in the field of Small & Medium Size Enterprises (SME) and Innovation between the Minister of Economy of the Republic of Poland and the Ministry of Economy of the United Arab Emirates.
- Memorandum of Understanding between the Ministry of Agriculture and Rural Development of the Republic of Poland and the Ministry of Environment and Water of the United Arab Emirates in the area of agriculture, food safety, scientific and research cooperation and agricultural and food marketing.
- Memorandum of Understanding between University of Sharjah and Medical University of Lublin.

== Academic and Professional Awards ==
- 2023 - Study of the U.S. Institutes for Global Scholars on U.S. Foreign Policy, University of Delaware, U.S. Department of State.
- 2007 - Leadership Qualifications to Work in a High State Position, National School of Public Administration, Warsaw, Poland, (State Exam).
- 2000 - The Best Graduate, Postgraduate National Security Studies, Office of the President of Poland, Ministry of National Defense, University of Warsaw, Poland.

== Selected publications ==
Books:

- Krzymowski, A. (2021). Europe's strategic autonomy in a transatlantic context at the turn of the centuries. Publisher WSGK. Kutno.
- Krzymowski, A. (2017). Diplomatic Relation between the Republic of Poland and the United Arab Emirates. Publisher Qindeel, Mohamed Bin Rashid Al Maktoum Knowledge Foundation. Exeter, Dubai. (ISBN 978-9948-23-483-8)
- Krzymowski, A. (2016). United States of America in the process of construction of the European strategic autonomy (1945-2001). Academic and Scientific Publisher ASPRA. Warsaw. (ISBN 978-83-7545-692-9)
- Krzymowski, A. (2005). Common Foreign and Security Policy of the European Union in terms of transatlantic relations (co-authored with Zbigniew Białobłocki), Scientific Publisher ELIPSA. Kutno. (ISBN 978-83-914971-7-3)

Book Chapters:

- Krzymowski, A. (2025). Sustainability from the Abraham Accords Countries' Perspective. In R. Brinkmann & C. Wityi Oo (Eds.), Palgrave Handbook of Practical Sustainability (page. 93–111). Palgrave Macmillan.
- Krzymowski, A. (2008). Geostrategic considerations of European integration in Central and Eastern Europe, chapter in book: Central and Eastern Europe in the integration process (ISBN 978-83-923280-3-2), University of National Economy,Kutno, 243 page.
- Krzymowski, A. (2008). Citizen Lexicon, Chapter X: Economy (authored of 46 entries concerning law and international organizations), Publisher CH Beck (ISBN 978-83-7483-933-4), Warsaw, 1232 page.

Articles:

- Krzymowski, A., Krzymowski, C.F. (2025). Strategic Significance of the Geopolitical Triangle: Balkans, South Caucasus, Middle East for Central And Eastern Europe Implementing the Three Seas Initiative (3SI). Przegląd Strategiczny, 15(18), 131-145. DOI: 10.14746/ps.2025.1.9
- Krzymowski, A. (2024). The United Arab Emirates' Economic Diversification Through the Space Sector and Its Diplomacy. Virtual Economics, 7(4), 30–47.doi.org/10.34021/ve.2024.07.04(2).
- Krzymowski, A. (2024). India-Middle East-Europe Economic Corridor in strategic connection with the Abraham Accords and the Three Seas Initiative. Journal of International Studies, 17(4),179-194. doi:10.14254/2071-8330.2024/174/11.
- Krzymowski, A. (2023). Strategic Significance of Joint Committees for Cooperation between Three Seas Initiatives Countries and the United Arab Emirates. Przegląd Strategiczny (Strategic Review), 13(16), 119–140. DOI: 10.14746/ps.2023.1.9.
- Krzymowski, A. (2022). Energy Transformation and the UAE Green Economy: Trade Exchange and Relations with Three Seas Initiative Countries. Energies, 15(22), 8410. DOI: 10.3390/en15228410
- Krzymowski, A. (2022). Role and Significance of the United Arab Emirates' Foreign Aid for its Soft Power Strategy and Sustainable Development Goals. Social Sciences, 11(2), 11–18. DOI: 10.3390/socsci11020048
- Krzymowski, A. (2022). The Baltic States of the Three Seas Initiative: Estonia, Latvia and Lithuania in Creative Relations with the United Arab Emirates. Creativity Studies, 15(1), 40-57 DOI:10.3846 cs.2022.13867

== See also ==
- Poland–United Arab Emirates relations

== Bibliography ==
- Krzymowski, Adam. Diplomatic Relation between the Republic of Poland and the United Arab Emirates. Qindeel, Mohamed Bin Rashid Al Maktoum Knowledge Foundation, 2017. ISBN 978-9948-23-483-8
