= Rural Development Foundation, Poland =

Polish foundation

The Rural Development Foundation is an NGO established by the Primate of Poland on June 30, 1999. It came as a result of the merger between the Water Supply Foundation and the Agricultural Foundation. Over the years many different programs have developed to help the rural communities of Poland.

== History ==
The foundation was created by two separate organizations merging. The Water Supply Foundation and The Agricultural Foundation make up what is now the current Rural Development Foundation.

Water Supply Foundation

This organization was established in 1987 from negotiations between the Catholic Church and the Communist regime. The main goal was to allow foundations to exist because the state had owned all property and existing foundations by law since 1952. The Water Supply Foundation supplied grants and loans to construct water and sewage systems in rural communities. Also, the foundation worked to organize trainings for locals starting small businesses, agrotourism, environmental protection, and learning about democracy.

Agricultural Foundation

This organization began in 1991. The main goal was to make rural communities less dependent on agriculture by creating other options for income. The foundation made this possible through supplying loans to people so they could become more independent and establish their own work places. The Agricultural Foundation was the only non-governmental organization in the country at the time and supported small water retention projects and reconstructing small hydro-electric power sites.

== Programs ==
=== Micro-Loan Program ===
One of the Rural Development Foundation's main objectives is to support non-agricultural business while fighting rural unemployment. the Micro-loan program started in 2003 to give to individuals of rural communities who wish to start their own small business. The maximum amount that could be loaned is 20,000 PLN (US$4,654.47) and were given free of interest between 24 and 36 months. To date only a half percent of microloan recipients have not been able to repay their loan. The program reaches Voivodships all over Poland from the north to the south.

Hydroelectric and Wind Power Stations This part of the loan program lends money to people who are investing in small hydroelectric or wind power stations. This part of the program has been going since 1994 and is the only program of its kind in Poland.

=== Financial Education ===
Since 2008, the Rural Development Foundation (RDF) partnered with Polish National Bank and Microfinance Center (MFC) to create a Financial Education program for Polish village residents. Throughout Poland's rural areas, like most of Eastern Europe, the financial literacy rate is extremely low and has often been found to contribute to stagnant low-income levels among families. According to the Microfinance Center, this is a result of communist times when managing individual finances was discouraged. Decades later, still a majority of Poland's population does not use any form of credit or have any long-term savings plan. This has become a growing concern for both the elderly and low-income families and for the future growth of Poland's economy.

The program has been structured in two parts. First, courses are held to train up trainers to teach future classes in more villages. Then the trainers go to their towns and villages to offer classes. The first series was on “How to budget expenses” and then a second series on “What is credit and how do I manage it?”

By 2009, the next phase of the Financial Education initiative was called “Plan Your Future.” RDF put together these workshops with the support of the Polish National Bank. There were nearly 150 new trainers and 50 villages participating with approximately 1,000 workshops held for rural area residents to attend. The Rural Development Foundation has plans to continue the financial education program for more Polish village residents to be more informed and live better lives because of it.

=== Program e-VITA ===
Since January 2004 the Rural Development Foundation (RDF) in partnership with the Polish-American Freedom Foundation has organized the "Active Village, Building the Information Society, e-VITA” program. The e-VITA program brings technology and information to residents of Poland's villages by working with local governments in making technology more readily available in rural areas. This is done through both establishing infrastructure and networks as well as educating residents on how it works. By providing more people access to the Internet villages are able to communicate faster, find better solutions to common problems, and broaden their understanding of the world.

The program has been implemented in two editions, first in 2004-05 and then from 2006 to 2008. Each edition has three main objectives: to support selected communities in the use of information technology, build portal for rural areas to be able to have internet connection, and then hold classes for community members to learn how to use the new technology. These two editions of e-VITA program have built enough networks for 1,967 village residents to access the Internet. The networks have especially benefitted schools, health facilities, recreational areas, and libraries. Furthermore, villages have taken their own initiatives to use the Internet to promote municipal information, cultural heritage festivals, and along with many other weekly events.

Today, the third edition of e-VITA now focuses two tasks. The first is on activities for design and construction of computer networks in 27 municipalities. At the same time, e-VITA provides locals support though free expert advisory assistance for construction of networks, advise in preparing EU grant applications, and training for local leaders in the planning and implementation of technical projects. The second task of e-VITA is known as ‘round table’ debates. These debates bring together experts in technology, local government officials, NGO leaders, and business representatives to host discussions on relevant community topics for the public to attend. E-VITA has developed a close partnership with local governments and NGO's and they have been essential to the success of the program. Through e-VITA's success a nationwide web portal has recently been launched to provide a one-stop source for up-to-date information for Polish villagers to use. The website,Witryna Wiejska has become an essential meeting place for thousands of people from all over Poland to find useful information.

The progress of the e-VITA program has played an important role in building a technologically advanced society. The interest of local authorities and their understanding of these issues have been essential to gain success in these rural area residents. RDF will continue to work with other NGOs, businesses and government leaders to speed the growth of access to networks for more communities throughout Poland in the future.

=== Training and Education Programs ===
Internet training taking place in a public internet access point in a gmina.

This program includes developing agro-tourism, planning projects to benefit local communities, and internet instruction for senior citizens. Sometimes training is done in three-day workshop settings and sometimes skills are taught through a course. People over 50 years old are trained to use a computer and to navigate their way through the internet. Another effective way for villagers to educate themselves is through the attending the nationwide conference of all active organizations in rural areas. This meeting is a good way for people to broaden their horizon by exchanging information and gaining ideas and knowledge.

=== Witryna Wiejska Website ===
This website is meant to give practical advice, information, and direct help to its users, but also to display current topics on education, advising, financing and life in local communities. The website developed from Atlas Initiative through an agreement between the Foundation and organizations that funding would be supplied for their projects in exchange for sharing their success stories online. This link still exists on the site today with listings of projects that worked well.

=== Internet competitions for young people ===
There are two internet competitions for students in secondary schools in Poland. The first is called Know Poland and teaches students how to find information about Poland on the internet. The winners of the contest are awarded a three-day stay in Warsaw, with their parents and also receive diplomas or certificates for their achievements. There is also a Know America internet contest where students fill out a questionnaire about the United States online. This project is coordinated through the United States Embassy in Poland and with Collegium Civitas. The Rural Development Foundation administers the program and Collegium Civitas provides a lecture on the United States. It is a great opportunity for students across Poland to gain a better understanding of their country and the United States.

=== Grant Competition Programs ===
"With 10,000 PLN, how can one improve the quality of life in our village, parish, or post-state farm settlement?" This is the question asked to the local NGO participants in this grant competition. This program's focus is to improve the quality of life in rural villages. NGO organizations such as associations, societies, foundations, religious organizations, private care establishments, youth organizations, rural minicentres, women's organizations, urban renewal groups, rural administrations, rural administration councils, parishes, voluntary fire brigades, and rural women's circles are allowed to submit an application. Applicants with projects fulfilling requirements can be awarded up to 10,000 PLN.

Protection of Biodiversity

This program works to make villagers want to preserve old species of flowers and plant life through grants for local projects. The program further encourages care for native livestock and wild animals in Poland that include, but are not limited to, the preservation of cows, pigs, sheep and horses.

== Past Projects ==
Hobbiton

=== The "Razem" Partnership- EQUAL ===
The Rural Development Foundation partners with EQUAL in "Eurovillage" partnership. This program focuses on getting people jobs who have not been employed before or who were unemployed. One of the main projects this program focuses on is creating thematic villages. These villages normally have high unemployment and very little opportunity for education. By preparing a thematic village, jobs will be created and allow people to avoid future unemployment. The themed villages will also attract outside investors (depending on the theme) and encourage young Poles to not emigrate from their village. The RDF has created 'Hobbiton' in Sieraków Sławieński, obviously themed after hobbits.

=== Pre-School Children's Clubs ===
This program comes from a partnership among the Rural Development Foundation, the Polish Children's Development Centre in Lublin, and the Teacher Training and Ongoing Education Centre in Suwałki. This group works to find alternative forms of pre-school education in rural communities in order to create equal education opportunities between rural and urban children. In areas where no pre-schools exist, Pre-School Children's Clubs are created to benefit teachers, students, and parents. In these clubs, teachers work with children 15 hours a week based on the curriculum for all pre-schools.
