= Jakub Sławek =

Polish politician (born 1976)

Jakub Sławek Ph.D.
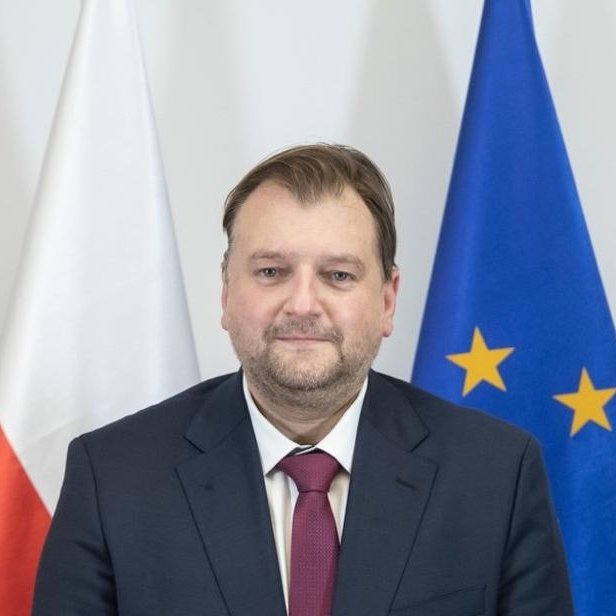

7th Poland Ambassador to the United Arab Emirates
- In office 2022–2024
- Succeeded by: Robert Rostek

Personal details
- Born: 1976 (age 49–50) Poland
- Spouse: Beata Sławek
- Children: 3
- Parent: Tadeusz Sławek
- Education: Jagiellonian University
- Profession: Diplomat, Arabist

Jakub Kacper Sławek (born 1976) is a Polish diplomat, from 2020 to 2022 chargé d'affaires and from 2022 to 2024 ambassador of the Republic of Poland to the United Arab Emirates.

== Life ==
Jakub Sławek graduated from Arabic studies at the Institute of Oriental Philology of the Jagiellonian University (2002). He also studied at Collegium Civitas in Warsaw, Paris and Damascus. In 2004 he became a sworn translator of the Arabic language. In 2008, at the Faculty of Oriental Studies at the University of Warsaw, he obtained a PhD in literary studies on the basis of the dissertation Tribalism and Text in the Culture of Yemen (doctoral advisor – Marek Dziekan).

In 2002 he started working at the Ministry of Foreign Affairs. He stayed at posts in Sanaa, Yemen (until 2006), Algiers, Algeria (from September 2007), and Riyadh, Saudi Arabia as the deputy head of the mission and the Consul of the Republic of Poland (from June 2012). In December 2017, he became deputy ambassador to Abu Dhabi, United Arab Emirates. On 1 October 2020, he took the position of chargé d'affaires ad interim there. On 16 November 2021, he was appointed ambassador to the . He took the post on 11 March 2022. He ended his mission in July 2024.

In 2024, he received from the President of the UAE Zayed al-Nahayan First-Class Medal of Independence.

== Personal life ==
Son of Ewa and Tadeusz Sławek. Married to Beata Sławek, father of three children.

Apart from Polish and Arabic, he speaks English, French, Italian and Russian.

== Works ==
- Jakub Sławek: Jemen – świat wartości plemiennych. Kurowice: Wydawnictwo Ibidem, 2011. ISBN 978-83-62331-03-1.
- Jakub Sławek: Arabskie i polskie słownictwo dyplomatyczne i polityczne = Muʿǧam būlandī-ʿarabī li ǎl-muṣṭalaḥāt ad-diblūmāsiyya wa as-siyāsiyya. Katowice: Wydawnictwo Uniwersytetu Śląskiego, 2016. ISBN 978-83-8012-578-0.

Translations

- Janusz Spyra: In the shadow of the Skoczów synagogue. Bielsko-Biała: Jewish Religious Community, 1998, ISBN 83-911161-0-7.
