= Poland–Saudi Arabia relations =

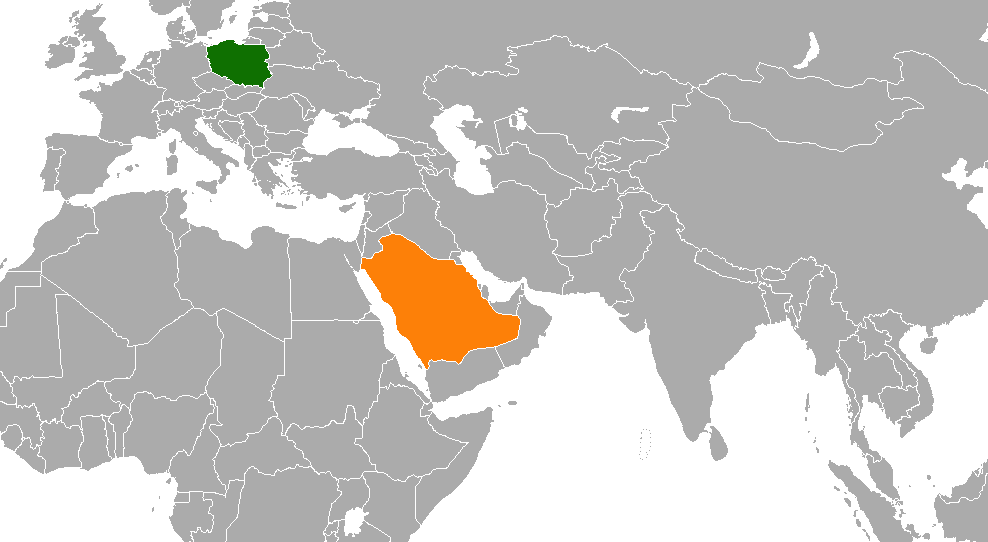
- Poland: Saudi Arabia

Poland–Saudi Arabia relations refers to the bilateral relations between Poland and Saudi Arabia.

== History ==
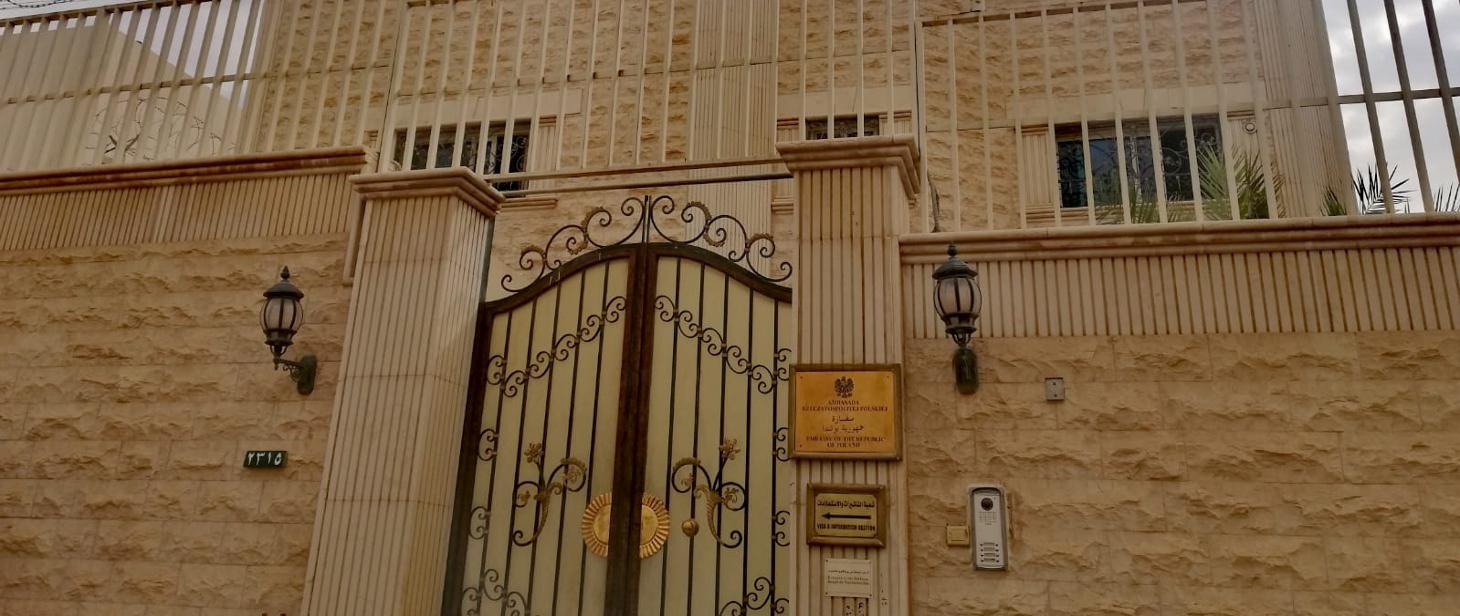
Embassy of Poland in Riyadh

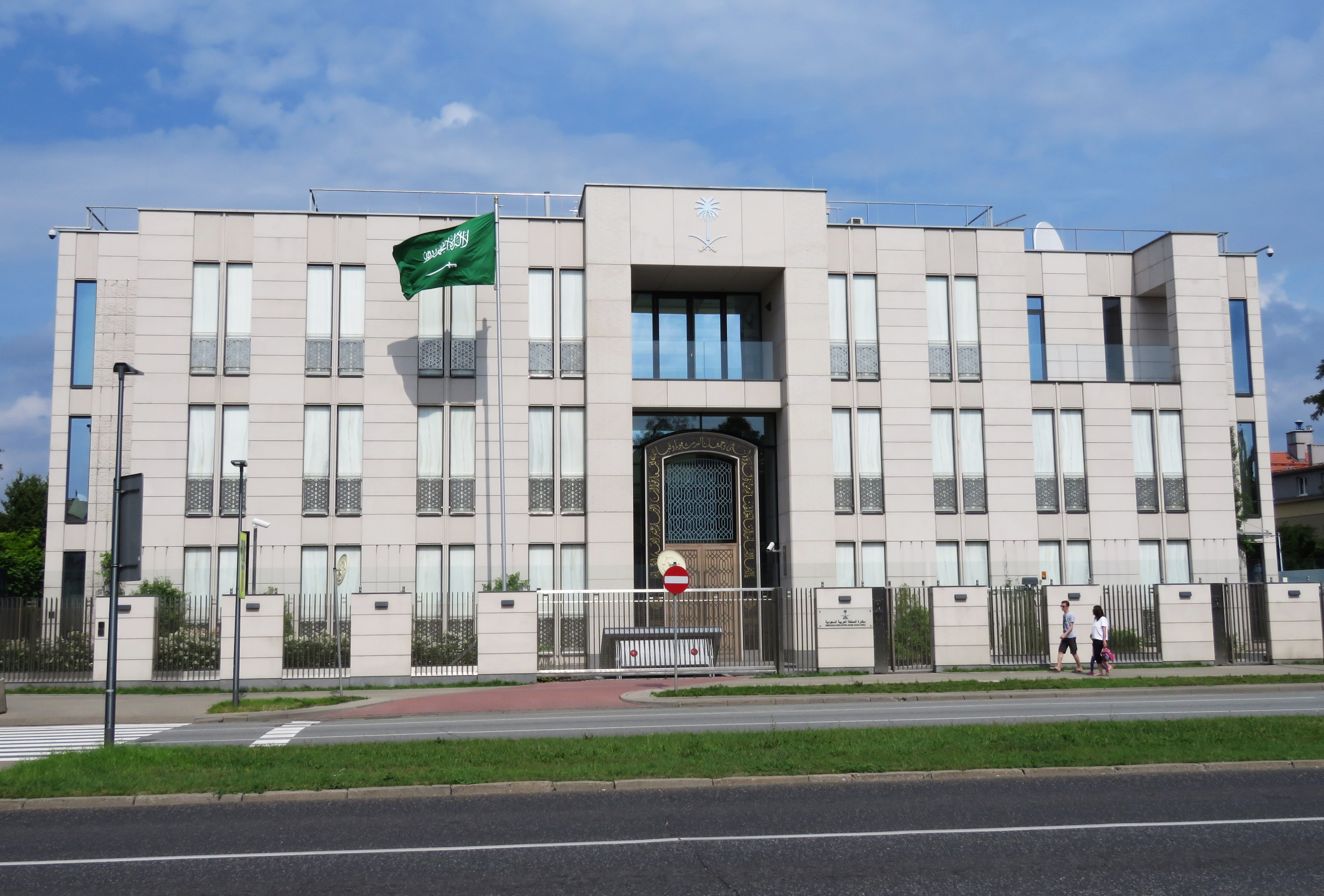
Embassy of Saudi Arabia in Warsaw

In June 1929, a representative of King Abdulaziz visited Warsaw. In the autumn of 1929, Poland recognized King Abdulaziz as the ruler of Hijaz, Nejd, and Dependent Territories. As the 9th state in the world, it established official relations with the Kingdom (the decision was formally taken on March 11th 1930).

The early-established relations saw a pause following the Invasion of Poland, which remained following the end of WWII and it's transition to communism.

Prior to the collapse of the Soviet Union, diplomatic relations between Poland and Saudi Arabia were limited and mostly indirect, due to Saudi Arabia's alignment with the United States during the Cold War, and Poland's communist government under the Eastern Bloc. The transition towards a democratic government in Poland after 1989 ultimately led to the establishment of official diplomatic relations on May 3, 1995.

Economic and energy cooperation gradually increased following the 2000s. In 2005 and 2006, both nations held Polish-Saudi Investment Forums, during which Polish business delegations visited major Saudi cities like Riyadh and Jubail. The 2000s saw joint ventures in energy, science, and investment, supported by frequent political consultations and mutual visits by officials, including those tied to the energy sector and high-level government meetings at GCC-EU forums.

Poland has a small but indigenous Muslim population, the Lipka Tatars, which are often granted pilgrims by the Saudi Government when they travel to Mecca and Medina for the Hajj.

In February 2019, Poland hosted the February 2019 Warsaw Conference alongside the United States, which was attended by Saudi Arabia and was aimed at countering Saudi Arabia's regional rival, Iran.

In September 2019, Poland condemned the Abqaiq–Khurais attack on Saudi oil refineries.

== Economic cooperation ==
Poland's transition to democracy and the subsequent reestablishment of Polish-Saudi relations saw economic and energy cooperation between the two nations in the 2000s.

Since 2023, the Kingdom of Saudi Arabia has been Poland’s most important raw material partner. By taking a stake in the Gdańsk refinery, the world’s largest company, the state-owned petrochemical giant Saudi Aramco, also entered Poland, opening a new chapter in the Polish-Saudi relations.

Saudi Arabia is Poland's top oil importer, supplying nearly half of the country's oil. In 2023, Poland imported $7.04 billion in crude oil from Saudi Arabia.

== Resident diplomatic missions ==
- Poland has an embassy in Riyadh.
- Saudi Arabia has an embassy in Warsaw.

== See also ==
- Foreign relations of Poland
- Foreign relations of Saudi Arabia
- Poland–United Arab Emirates relations
