= Robert Rostek =

Polish politician

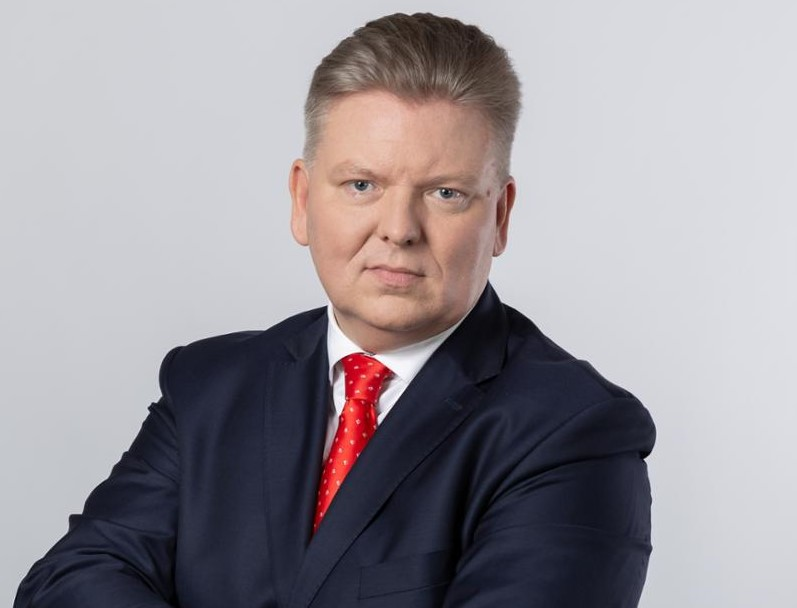

1st Poland Ambassador to Qatar
- In office 20 October 2008 – December 2013
- Succeeded by: Krzysztof Suprowicz

6th Poland Ambassador to the United Arab Emirates
- In office August 2016 – 30 September 2020
- Preceded by: Adam Krzymowski
- Succeeded by: Jakub Sławek

5th Poland Ambassador to Saudi Arabia
- Incumbent
- Assumed office February 2023
- Preceded by: Jan Stanisław Bury

Personal details
- Born: 20 December 1968 (age 57) Wrocław, Poland
- Children: son Patryk
- Education: Jagiellonian University
- Profession: Diplomat

Robert Artur Rostek (born 20 December 1968 in Wrocław, Poland) is a Polish civil servant and career diplomat serving as a Poland ambassador to Qatar (2008–2013), the United Arab Emirates (2016–2020), and Saudi Arabia (since 2023).

== Education ==
Robert Rostek attended high school in Warsaw (1984–1988). He graduated from Arab studies at the Jagiellonian University in 1995. He studied at the University of Tripoli, Libya (1989–1990) and Damascus University, Syria (1993–1994) as well.

He speaks Arabic, English, and Russian languages.

== Diplomatic career ==
Robert Rostek joined the Polish diplomatic service in 1996. He has worked, among others, at the Polish Consulate General in Benghazi (1996), the embassies in Cairo (1999–2000), Kuwait (2003), and the US Interests Section of the Polish Embassy in Baghdad (2000–2003). In 2003, he was appointed Special Representative from the Polish Ministry of Foreign Affairs to the Polish Special Mission in Iraq (Coalition Provisional Authority, CPA) and Special Assistant to ambassador Marek Belka, Chief of the Protocol of the Council for International Coordination of the Coalition Provisional Authorities (CPA) in Iraq. In 2006, he was appointed civil servant (Slużba Cywilna). Following his work as chargé d'affaires in Doha, Qatar, where since 2006 he was establishing an embassy, Robert Rostek became two years later an ambassador to Qatar. He ended his term in December 2013 and returned to the Ministry of Foreign Affairs in Warsaw as the Head of the Maghreb and Mashreq Unit, Department of Africa and the Middle East. In June 2016, he was nominated Poland ambassador to United Arab Emirates. He took the post in August 2016. He ended his term on 30 September 2020. On 10 May 2021, he became deputy director of the Department of Africa and the Middle East. On 30 November 2022, Rostek was nominated ambassador to Saudi Arabia, accredited also to Oman, and Yemen. He began his term in February 2023.

In 2014, Robert Rostek became an Honorary Member of the Polish Olympic Committee International Relations Commission.

2026 - Ambassador at Large (special diplomatic title awarded by Deputy Prime Minister and Foreign Minister)

Initiator of air connections to Poland by: Qatar Airways (2012) Doha - Warsaw, FlyDubai (2018) Dubai - Cracow, PLL LOT (2024) Warsaw - Riyadh and Flynas (2025) Riyadh - Cracow.

== Honours ==
- 2003 – United States – State Department Special Award for work in the US Interests Section in Iraq
- 2011 – Gold order “Distinguished for Oil and Gas", PGNiG Polish Oil and Gas Company
- 2013 – Gold Order of Merit of the State of Qatar
- 2020 – Order of Independence First Class of the United Arab Emirates
- 2020 – the Gold Medal of the 100th anniversary of the Polish Olympic Committee in recognition of activity for the Polish Olympic movement and sport in the Arab world
- 2022 – Knight's Cross of the Order of Polonia Restituta for activities in the energy sector of Poland
- 2023 – The title of Honorary Ambassador of the city of Wrocław (Poland)
- 2025 - Special medal of Salt Mine Wieliczka (Poland)
- 2026 - Honorary distinction of the city of Zakopane (Poland)
