= Jacek Saryusz-Wolski =

Polish diplomat and politician

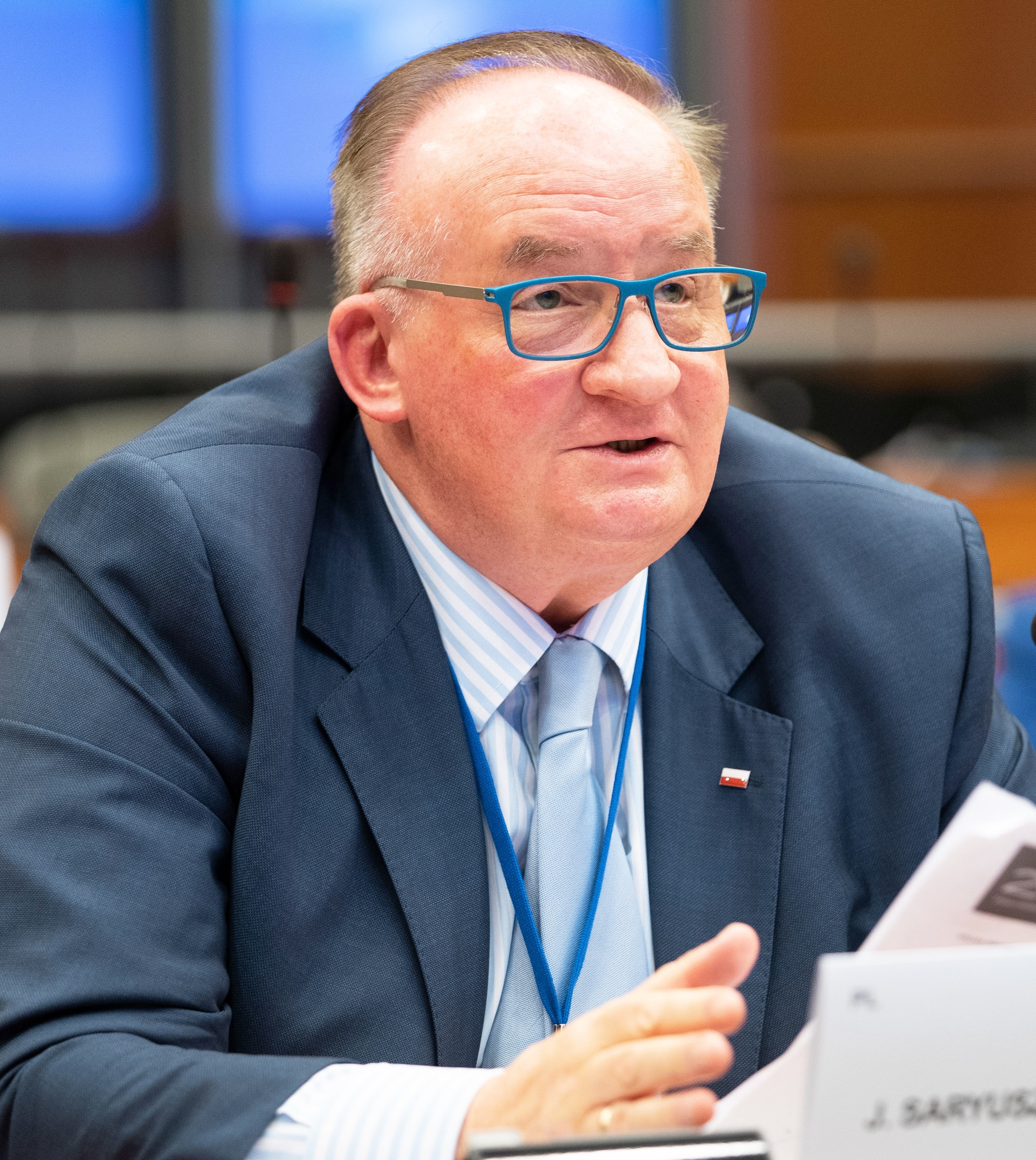
- Jacek Saryusz-Wolski speaking in the European Parliament in Brussels

Member of the European Parliament for Łódź
- In office 20 July 2004 – July 16, 2024
- Succeeded by: Waldemar Buda

Personal details
- Born: 19 September 1948 (age 78) Łódź, Poland
- Party: Law and Justice (2019–present)
- Other political affiliations: Civic Platform (2004–2019)
- Spouse: Grazyna
- Children: 2
- Education: University of Łódź
- Profession: diplomat, politician, director at Collegium Civitas
- Website: saryusz-wolski.pl

Jacek Emil Saryusz-Wolski (born 19 September 1948) is a Polish diplomat and PiS (Law and Justice) politician. He has been a Member of the European Parliament (MEP) since June 2004. He served as vice president of the European Parliament (2004–2007). Saryusz-Wolski is chairman of the executive board of the “Foundation College of Europe”, in charge of the Natolin campus of the College of Europe.

== Early life and education ==
Saryusz-Wolski comes from a family of the Jelita coat of arms. His father, Emil, a chemical engineer, was stationed with Polish troops in Britain during the Second World War, while his mother, Eryka, worked as a landscape gardener.

He graduated from the First High School of "Nicolaus Copernicus" in Łódź and he obtained a degree in economics from the University of Łódź. He also completed postgraduate studies at the Centre Européen Universitaire in Nancy, France. In the 1970s he was a lecturer on the European Communities at the University of Łódź and in the 1980s he was an assistant professor in the Department of Socialist Political Economy of the University of Łódź. At the turn of the 1980s and 1990s led the Center for European Studies at the University of Łódź.

== Political career ==
Saryusz-Wolski was nominated the first Polish plenipotentiary for European integration and foreign aids (pełnomocnik ds. integracji europejskiej i pomocy zagranicznej) when this office was created in 1991 by the prime minister Jan Krzysztof Bielecki. He held this position till 1996, despite the frequent government changes. He returned to the government in 2000, when the prime minister Jerzy Buzek has nominated him a secretary in the European Integration Committee (Komitet Integracji Europejskiej). Jacek Saryusz-Wolski played an important role in the negotiations in Nice in 2000. In 2001, he unsuccessfully ran for the Polish Senate on behalf of Blok Senat 2001.

=== Member of the European Parliament ===
Saryusz-Wolski was elected an MEP at the European Parliament election on 13 June 2004, as a candidate of Civic Platform, in the constituency #6 (Łódź Voivodship) receiving 66,589 votes (that is 16.92%, the best result in the region).

On 20 July 2004, he was elected as one of the Vice Presidents of the European Parliament for the EPP, and was at the position till 16 January 2007. He was re-elected in 2009 and 2014.

Since first joining the European Parliament, Saryusz-Wolski has been a member of the Committee on Foreign Affairs, which he chaired between 2007 and 2009.

In late 2004, Saryusz-Wolski's candidacy to become Poland’s first-ever European Commissioner was supported by the main Polish opposition parties but the post eventually went to the country’s Europe minister, Danuta Hübner.

In March 2006, Saryusz-Wolski was elected vice president of the European People's Party (EPP) for a three-year term. He also served as vice-president and member of the national board of Civic Platform until October 2010 and as leader of the Polish delegation of centre-right MEPs until 2012. In 2007, the Civic Platform failed to secure sufficient backing from within the centre-right European People’s Party Group for Saryusz-Wolski, its candidate as for the post of vice-president of the European Parliament.

In 2010, Saryusz-Wolski joined the Friends of the EEAS, an unofficial and independent pressure group formed because of concerns that the High Representative of the Union for Foreign Affairs and Security Policy Catherine Ashton was not paying sufficient attention to the Parliament and was sharing too little information on the formation of the European External Action Service.

In addition to his parliamentary assignments, Saryusz-Wolski chaired the EPP Energy Ministers Meeting until 2017. In 2015, he and Françoise Grossetête guided the EPP’s working groups on economy and environment and foreign affairs in developing options for getting the EU to speak with a unified voice on external energy security matters.

In March 2017, the Polish government of Prime Minister Beata Szydło openly opposed the reelection of Donald Tusk as President of the European Council for a second two-and-a-half year term and put forward Saryusz-Wolski as a challenger. After Saryusz-Wolski accepted the nomination for council president, Civic Platform ejected him from the party. He was subsequently stripped of his position of vice-president within the EPP. He also stopped being a member of the EPP group in the Parliament.

In February 2019, he was appointed as the leader of the Law and Justice (PiS) list in the European elections in constituency No. 4 (Warsaw). In March of the same year he joined the parliamentary group of European Conservatives and Reformists. As a result of the May vote, he was elected the MEP for the fourth time, receiving 186,851 votes.

== Political positions ==
Saryusz-Wolski is widely regarded as having played a big role in the 2004 Orange Revolution in Ukraine and in support for the opposition in Belarus. In the debate on the EU’s energy diversification and security policies, he has in the past argued that “Nord Stream 2 would be, above all, detrimental in geopolitical terms . . . for the purpose of exerting more political pressure and applying blackmail on the EU, its eastern member states and its eastern neighbours.”

In 2015, news media reported that Saryusz-Wolski was included in a Russian blacklist of prominent people from the European Union who are not allowed to enter the country.

== Other activities ==
- European Policy Centre, member of the Strategic Council
- European Union Institute at Collegium Civitas, director
- Natolin European Centre, chairman
- College of Europe Foundation at the College of Europe campus in Natolin, chairman
- Euro-Atlantic Association, member
- Polish Institute of International Affairs (PISM), deputy chairman
- German-Polish-Ukrainian Society (GPUS), member

== Recognition ==
Saryusz-Wolski has been awarded the Commander's Cross of the Order of Polonia Restituta (2003), the French Legion of Honour (2003), the Ukrainian Order of Merit of 1st Class (2006), the Georgian St. George's Order of Victory (2013).

== Personal life ==
Saryusz-Wolski is married to his wife, Grazyna, a professor in English literature at Lodz University. The couple have a son and a daughter.
