= Poland–United Arab Emirates relations =

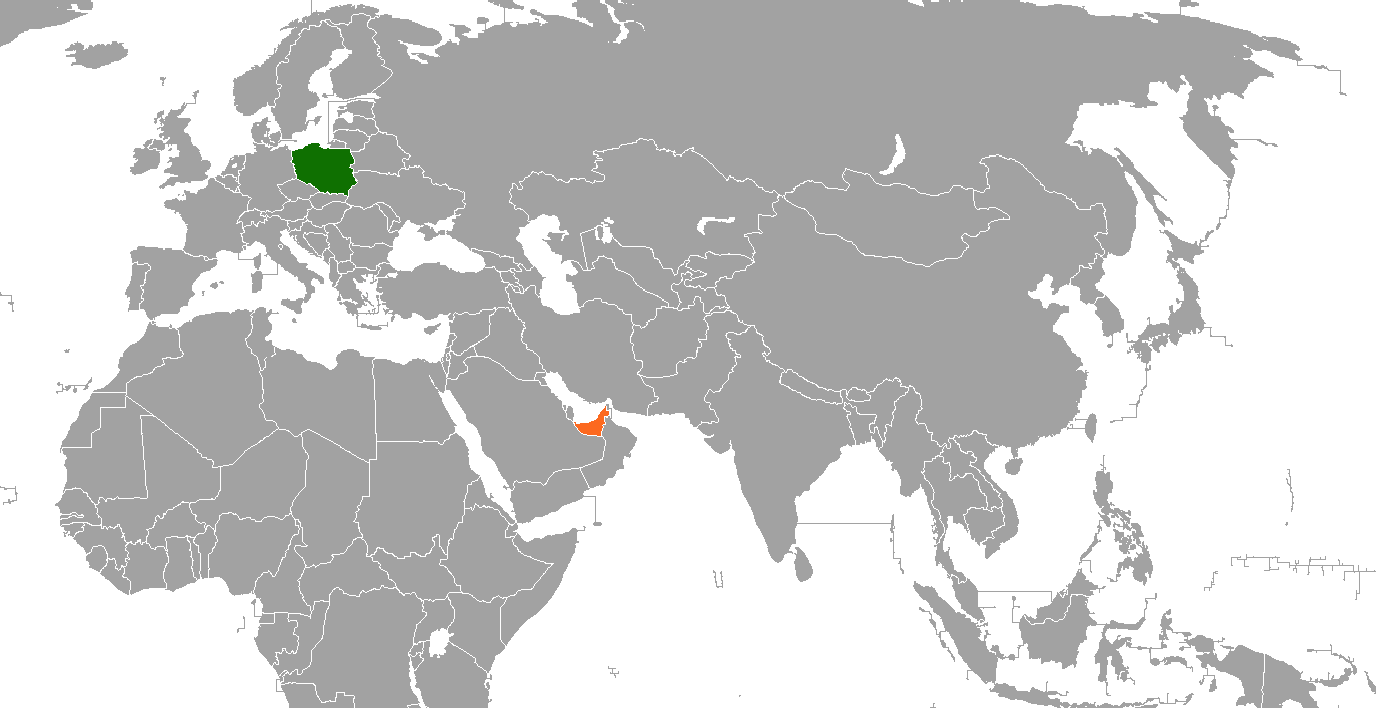

- Poland: United Arab Emirates

Diplomatic mission
- Embassy of Poland, Abu Dhabi: Embassy of the United Arab Emirates, Warsaw

Republic of Poland and the United Arab Emirates established diplomatic relations in 1989. Poland has an embassy in Abu Dhabi, and the United Arab Emirates has its counterpart in Warsaw.

== History ==
Following the success of Solidarity movement, Poland established relations with the Emirates in 1989. The UAE has become Poland's key partner in the Arab world in the context of political dialogue and economic cooperation ever since.

== Cooperation ==
Since establishment of relations in 1989, the United Arab Emirates have emerged to become Poland's largest trade partner in the Arab World. The promotion of Polish interests in UAE involves Polish Trade Office based in Dubai, the National Chamber of Commerce and the Polish Tourist Organization, Credit Insurance, Bonds and Financing Public Company, which supports the activities of Polish exporters on the local market, providing insurance services to Polish entrepreneurs. Polish Business Group was established in March 2006 under the auspices of the Abu Dhabi Chamber of Commerce and Industry is a communication platform between the representations of the governments of Poland and the UAE. Polish Investment and Trade Agency has also been active on promoting the relations.

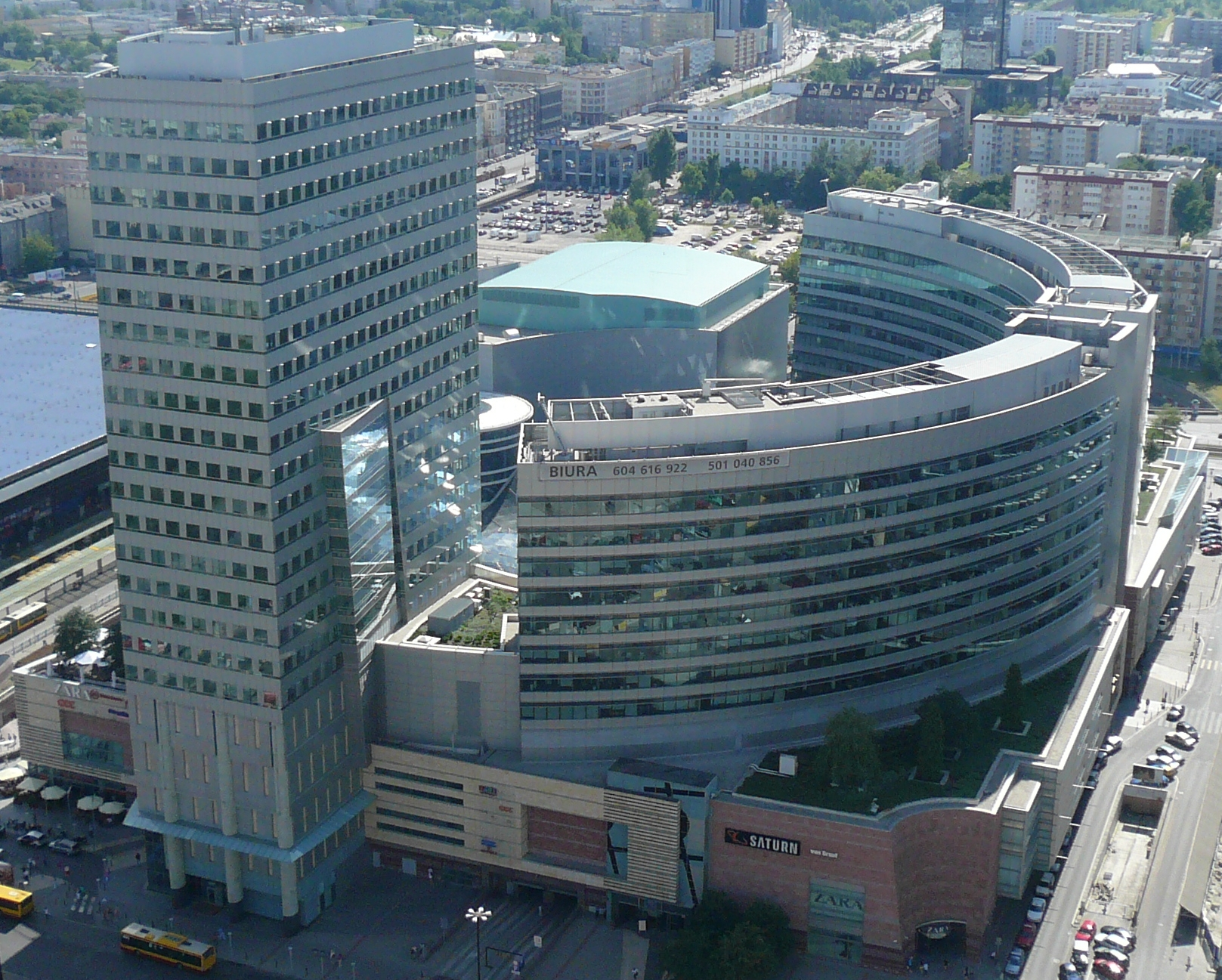
Złote Tarasy building hosting the UAE embassy in Warsaw

In 2015, an Emirati delegation headed to Warsaw to discuss on upgrading the strong tie between two countries. The United Arab Emirates is keen to increase the cooperation with Poland.

In November 2019, the United Arab Emirates and Poland reviewed cooperation prospects and bilateral partnerships in Sharjah with the aim to elevate the status and encouraged Polish business people to do its works in the country. A month later, H.E. Dr. Abdullah Belhaif Al Nuaimi, UAE Minister of Infrastructure Development and Chairman of Federal Transport Authority (FTA) – Land and Maritime, met with Marek Gróbarczyk, Polish Minister of Maritime Economy and Inland Navigation to discuss opening free maritime and land transportation and links.

=== Free movement agreement ===
In May 2015, the UAE and the European Union, which Poland is a member, had signed a reciprocal bilateral short-stay visa waiver agreement exempting Emirati citizens from Schengen visa regime and making the UAE the first Arab country to receive such a visa waiver for its nationals. Since May 7, 2015, UAE citizens who hold diplomatic, special, service and ordinary passports are able to travel without a visa to Poland and other EU countries which make up the Schengen area for stays of up to 90 days (within any 180-day period of one year). Both Dubai based Airlines (Emirates and flydubai) offer its passengers direct daily services to Poland.

=== Military ===
In July 2019, the United Arab Emirates participated in 27th International Defence Industry Exhibition in Poland.

=== Education ===
Since 2014, Poland and the United Arab Emirates have increased cooperation in the educational front. In 2014, Polish Ambassador Adam Krzymowski visited Sorbonne University Abu Dhabi, where he discussed educational exchanges between Polish and Emirati universities. The same year, Polish Ministry of Science launched the Arabic language version of the www.go-poland.pl website.

=== Security ===
The United Arab Emirates actively sent a delegation to participate in the February 2019 Warsaw Conference organized by the United States and host Poland to counter Iranian threat.

== Poles in the United Arab Emirates ==
As of 2024 9,000 Poles live in UAE.

Some notable Polish expatriates living in the United Arab Emirates

- Adam Krzymowski
- Kasia Vuorinen

== Resident diplomatic missions ==
- Poland has an embassy in Abu Dhabi.
- United Arab Emirates has an embassy in Warsaw.

== See also ==
- Foreign relations of Poland
- Foreign relations of the United Arab Emirates
- Poland–Saudi Arabia relations
