= Stanisław Parzymies =

Stanisław Edward Parzymies (born 11 October 1938 in Krasnystaw) is a Polish international relations scholar, an expert on French-German relations. He is a former chairman of the scientific board at the Institute of International Relations and the head of the European Integration Section of the Institute of International Relations, University of Warsaw.
