= Civitas University =

Private university in Warsaw, Poland

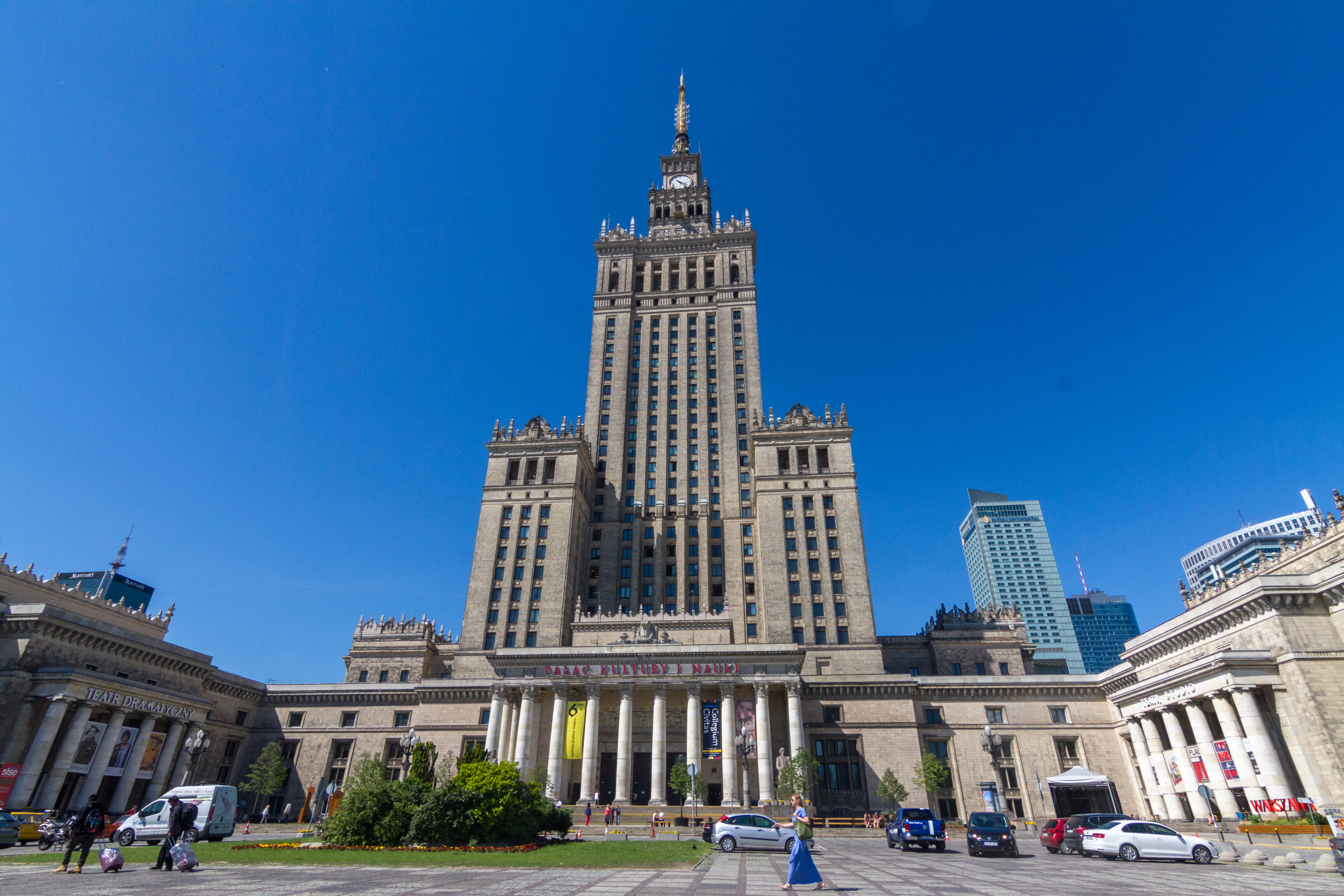
- The Palace of Culture and Science, where the university is located
- Type: Private
- Established: 1997; 29 years ago
- Affiliations: National Accreditation Commission; Conference of Rectors of Academic Schools in Poland; Conference of Rectors of Non-Public Academic Universities; International Association of Universities; European School of Sustainability Sciences and Research; European Association for International Education
- Rector: Professor Stanisław Mocek
- Honorary President: Professor Jadwiga Koralewicz
- Academic staff: 200
- Students: 2,861 (12.2023)
- Location: Warsaw, Masovia, Poland; 52.231667°N 21.006389°E
- Campus: Urban (Palace of Culture and Science)
- Website: civitas.edu.pl/en
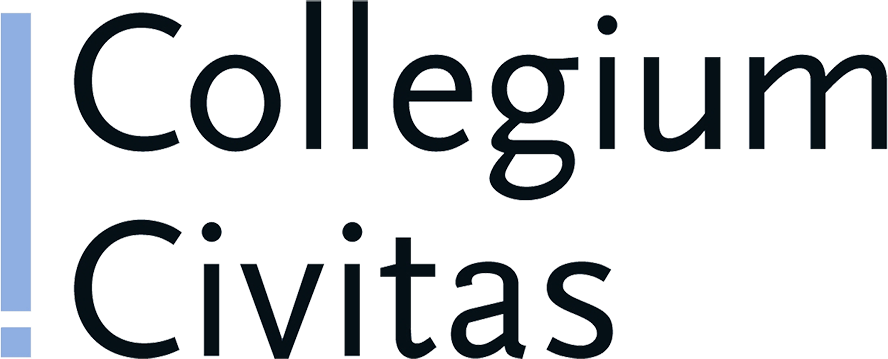

Civitas University (Polish: Uniwersytet Civitas) is one of Poland's leading non-public higher education institutions. It is a member of the Conference of Rectors of Academic Schools in Poland (CRASP) and the Conference of Rectors of Non-Public Academic Universities (KRAUN). The university incorporates practices in higher education, including interdisciplinary approaches, enhanced lecturer-student interaction, study abroad programs, internships, and support for individual student research projects.

It has a diverse student body representing over 60 countries. Civitas University is also a signatory of the Magna Charta Universitatum and holds the Erasmus Charter for Higher Education 2021–2027.

On September 10, 2024, Civitas University (then as Collegium Civitas) joined the Merito Group, the largest group of non-public universities in Poland.

== History ==
Civitas University traces its roots back to 1997 when it was established through the initiative of a group of scientists from the Polish Academy of Sciences (PAN) under the name Collegium Civitas. Professors from five institutes of PAN — Political Studies, Philosophy and Sociology, History, History of Art, and Slavic Studies — pooled their expertise and knowledge to establish Civitas University. Since its inception, Civitas University has been providing higher education to both Polish and international students. Civitas University was the first non-public university in Poland to welcome foreign students in 1997.

As of 2024, the Rector is Professor Stanisław Mocek, the President is Professor Jadwiga Koralewicz, and the Chancellor is Roma Równiak. In April 2025, Civitas was granted university status, and the previous name (Collegium Civitas) was replaced with a new one (Civitas University) to reflect the university's new status.

== Degrees ==
The university offers a wide range of bachelor's and master's degree programs taught in Polish, English and bilingual (Polish-English) across four primary disciplines: International Relations, Sociology, Management, and Journalism and New Media. Civitas University also has the right to grant PhD degrees in Sociology, and Politics and Administration.

== Location ==
The university is situated within the Palace of Culture and Science in Warsaw, the capital of Poland.

== Notable alumni ==
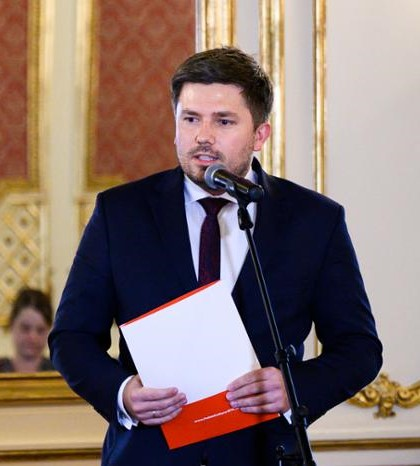
Adrian Kubicki

- Adrian Kubicki (born 1987), Consul General of the Republic of Poland in New York City.
- Paulina Matysiak (born 1984), member of the 9th and the 10th terms Sejm.
- Marcin Porzucek (born 1984), politician.
- Robert Rowiński (born 1984), dancer, choreographer, and model.
- Jakub Sławek (born 1976), diplomat.
- Jakub Wesołowski (born 1985), film, television, and theatre actor; journalist.
- Maciej Żywno (born 1976), politician and educator

== Notable faculty ==
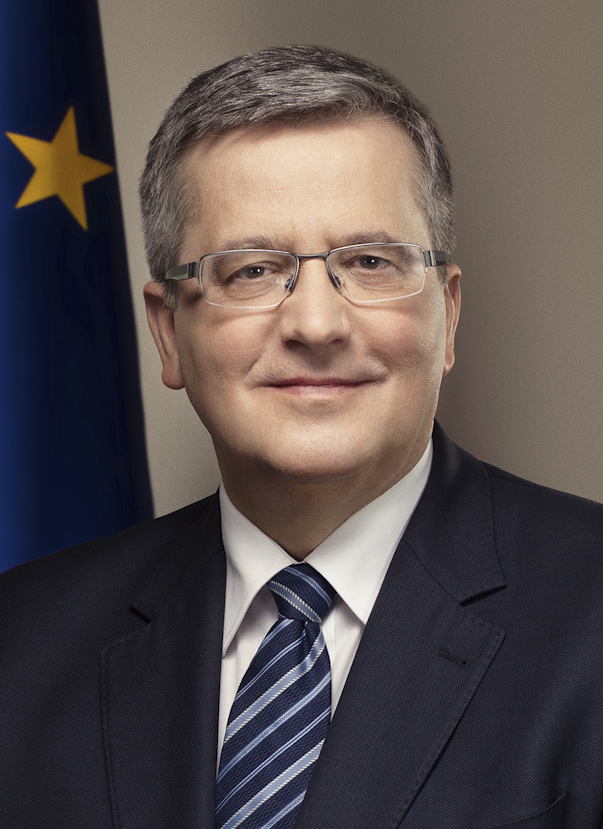
Bronisław Komorowski

- Bronisław Komorowski (born1952), historian, president of Poland, and Polish Minister of Defence
- Henryk Lipszyc (born 1941), scientist and professor of Japanese studies.
- Rafał Pankowski (born 1976), sociologist and political scientist.
- Wojciech Roszkowski (born 1947), historian and politician.
- Jacek Saryusz-Wolski (born 1948), diplomat and politician.
- Rafał Trzaskowski (born 1972), politician.
- Edmund Wnuk-Lipiński (1944-2015), sociologist, political scientist, and writer.
- Jacek Żakowski (born 1957), journalist and author.
- Krzysztof Zanussi (born 1939), film and theatre director, producer and screenwriter.

== Programs in English ==
- 3-year BA in International Relations
- 3-year BA in Sociology
- 3-year BA in Management
- 3-year BA in Journalism and New Media
- 2-year MA in International Relations
- 2-year MA in Sociology
- 2-year MA in Management
- PhD in Sociology
- PhD in Politics and Administration

== Programs in Polish ==
- 3-year BA in International Relations
- 3-year BA in Sociology
- 3-year BA in Management
- 3-year BA in Journalism and New Media
- 2-year MA in International Relations
- 2-year MA in Sociology
- 2-year MA in Management
- 5-year MA in Law
- PhD in Sociology
- PhD in Politics and Administration
