= February 2019 Warsaw Conference =

2019 diplomatic conference

The Ministerial to Promote a Future of Peace and Security in the Middle East US-led Middle East conference in Warsaw
- In blue: Countries that participated in the conference. In red: Countries that were invited to the conference but did not participate.
- Host country: Poland
- Date: 13–14 February 2019
- City: Warsaw, Poland
- Venue: PGE National Stadium
- Participants: 45 countries: Afghanistan; Albania; Algeria; Australia; Austria; Azerbaijan; Bahrain; Belgium; Brazil; Bulgaria; Colombia; Croatia; Cyprus; Czech Republic; Egypt; France; Georgia; Germany; India; Israel; Jordan; Kuwait; Latvia; Luxembourg; Malaysia; Malta; Morocco; New Zealand; Netherlands; Nigeria; Norway; Oman; Poland (host); Portugal; Romania; Saudi Arabia; Slovakia; Slovenia; South Korea; Sweden; Tajikistan; United Arab Emirates; United Kingdom; United States; Yemen (Hadi government)
- Chair: POL; USA

Key points
- Terrorism and extremism; Missile development and proliferation; Maritime trade and security; Threats by proxy groups across Middle East

The February 2019 Warsaw Conference, commonly known as the US-led Middle East conference in Warsaw, took place on 13 and 14 February 2019 in Warsaw, capital of Poland. The conference was hosted by Poland and the United States. According to the joint official announcement of the meeting, the issues of the event were: "terrorism and extremism, missile development and proliferation, maritime trade and security, and threats posed by proxy groups across the region". In early February, the US Secretary of State Mike Pompeo had said that the purpose of the conference is to focus on "Iran's influence and terrorism in the region". However, after the European objections to the purpose, the United States was forced to backtrack on planning to build a global coalition against Iran.

The Warsaw Conference became the semi-official ground for the Arab–Israeli alliance against Iran, in light of the Iran–Israel proxy conflict and the Iran–Saudi Arabia proxy conflict. The coalition emerged in 2017, upon warming ties between Israel and the Gulf States, and received broad media attention in light of the February 2019 Warsaw Conference.

== Press conference ==
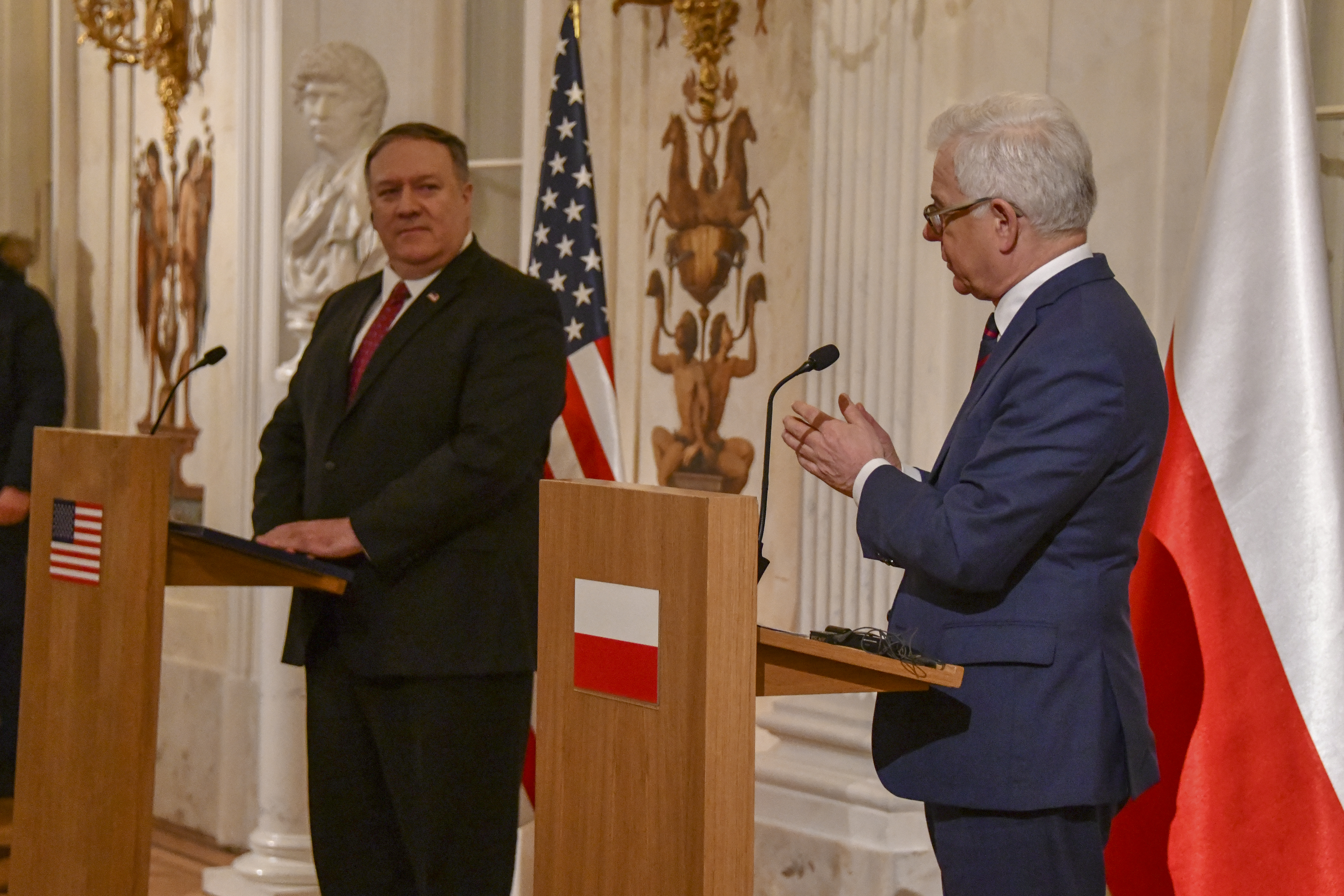
Secretary Pompeo Participates in a Joint Press Conference With Polish Foreign Minister Czaputowicz

On 12 February, US Secretary of State and Polish Foreign Minister had a press conference, one day before the summit on the "peace and security for the Middle East" officially begins. Pompeo said that more than 60 states are participating in the Warsaw summit.

U.S. Secretary of State Mike Pompeo said in an interview while in Warsaw: "We want the Iranian people to have the opportunity to live in a prosperous, peaceful society, and one that is controlled by their desires, their wishes."

== Reactions ==
The first day of the meetings, Israeli Prime Minister, Benjamin Netanyahu, wrote on Twitter that the meeting with Arab leaders was to reach a "common interest of war with Iran", repeated in a press release. Later the tweet was deleted, and the press release amended to "common interest of combatting Iran".

Iran has protested over the conference, calling it a hostile move. The foreign policy chief of the European Union, Federica Mogherini said that she will not attend the Warsaw meeting, "which has received a cool reception from European countries." Russia's Foreign Ministry also released a statement on 22 January and cited that Russian officials will not attend the conference, which it described as an "anti-Iran platform." Major European powers such as Germany and France, refused to send their top diplomats over fears that the summit was designed mainly to build an alliance against Iran.

British Foreign Secretary, Jeremy Hunt, agreed to attend the summit but only on the condition that the United Kingdom, United States, United Arab Emirates and Saudi Arabia hold a meeting on the margins about Yemen.

Speaking in Warsaw, the U.S. Vice President Mike Pence called the regime in Iran the "greatest threat to peace and security in the Middle East". Mike Pence, criticized some European countries trying to weaken US sanctions against Iran and said Iran is after "another holocaust".

Former New York Mayor, Rudy Giuliani said in a press conference in Warsaw that Tehran should be isolated

Khalid bin Salman, Saudi Arabia's ambassador to the United States said the reason for his taking part in the Warsaw summit was, "to take a firm stand against forces that threaten the future of peace and security," in particular Iranian.

On 13 and 14 February, a group of supporters of the National Council of Resistance of Iran that favor "regime change" in the Islamic Republic of Iran, held a rally in Warsaw to coincide with the conference. Rudy Giuliani, at the time serving as personal lawyer to then-President Donald Trump, attended the rally and demanded stronger policies against the Iranian government and its human rights violations.

Speaking at the rally held by several hundred Mojahedin-e Khalq (MEK) supporters in Warsaw, former New York Mayor Mr. Giuliani said any peace plan in the region needs a "major change in the theocratic dictatorship in Iran".

Speakers at a MEK rally in Warsaw also included Sid Ahmad Ghozali, a former prime minister of Algeria, Robert Torricelli, a former US Democratic senator, along with several members of the Polish parliament.

The Palestinian ruling party in Gaza Hamas has denounced the conference in which the "Israeli leaders who keep perpetrating heinous crimes against the Palestinian people, desecrating holy sites, and denying the Palestinians of their basic rights."

Turkey also refused an invitation by the United States to attend a summit in Warsaw on countering Iranian influence in the Middle East, on the grounds that it "targets one country", in particular Iran. However, Turkey didn't denounce the participation of Azerbaijan, a fellow Turkic country and ally of Turkey nor Azerbaijan's anti-Iranian stance.

On March 1, 2021, during a speech, former US Secretary of State Mike Pompeo credited the 2019 Warsaw Conference with providing the breakthrough that paved the way for the Abraham Accords. During the actual conference, Secretary of State Pence stated, "Tonight I believe we are beginning a new era, with Prime Minister Netanyahu from the State of Israel, with leaders from Bahrain, Saudi Arabia, and the UAE, all breaking bread together, and later in this conference sharing honest perspectives on the challenges facing the area."

== See also ==
- Donald Trump's speech in Warsaw, Poland
- Joint Comprehensive Plan of Action
- United States withdrawal from the Joint Comprehensive Plan of Action
- List of Middle East peace proposals
