= Tsinghua Shenzhen =

Tsinghua Shenzhen may refer to:

- Tsinghua Shenzhen International Graduate School
- Tsinghua–Berkeley Shenzhen Institute
