= Tsinghua clique =

Political party faction in China

- Leader: Xi Jinping & Hu Jintao
- Members: Zhu Rongji; Lin Wenyi; Wang Qishan; Liu Yandong; Chen Xi; Li Xi; Hu Heping; Chen Jining; Zhang Guoqing
- Founded: 1947 (Kuomintang); 2008 (Communist)
- Dissolved: c. 1970s (Kuomintang)
- Headquarters: Communist: Beijing; Kuomintang: Nanking (to 1949); Taipei (from 1949)
- Newspaper: People's Daily
- Ideology: Communists: Chinese communism Socialism with Chinese characteristics Scientific Outlook on Development; Xi Jinping Thought; Populism; Chinese nationalism Kuomintang: Three Principles of the People; Chinese nationalism Anti-communism

The term Tsinghua clique refers to a group of Chinese Communist Party (CCP) politicians that have graduated or have taught at Tsinghua University (Chinese: 清华大学; pinyin: Qīnghuá Dàxué). They are members of the fourth generation of Chinese leadership, and are purported to hold powerful reformist ideas (a number have studied in the United States following graduation from Tsinghua, and some are said to be influenced by the reform ideals of Hu Yaobang). Just like their predecessors, they attach great importance to socialism with Chinese characteristics. Their ascendance to power is likely to have begun in 2008 at the CCP's 17th National Congress.

Many Tsinghua graduates rise to political prominence. Among the 7 standing committees at the Politburo, there is one Tsinghua graduate; among the 25 Politburo committee members, there are three.

Key figures are reported to currently include:

- Xi Jinping
- Wang Qishan
- Chen Xi
- Li Xi
- Hu Heping
- Chen Jining
- Zhang Guoqing
- Yang Yue

Retired or deceased:

- Zhang Dongsun
- Zhang Junmai
- Luo Longji
- Fei Xiaotong
- Pan Guangdan
- Qian Weichang
- Peng Peiyun
- Kang Shien
- Wu Guanzheng
- Hu Qili
- Huang Ju
- Yao Yilin
- Song Ping
- Li Ximing
- Wang Hanbin
- Zhou Guangzhao
- Zheng Tianxiang
- Zhu Rongji
- Hu Jintao
- Wu Bangguo, although he is generally considered more loyal to Jiang Zemin's Shanghai clique
- Lin Wenyi, chairman of the Taiwan Democratic Self-Government League
- Liu Yandong

The Tsinghua clique also referred to a group of Nationalist Chinese politicians who held high power in the Republic of China government and fled to Taiwan with the government during the Chinese Civil War. All of them are deceased:

- Yeh Kung-chao
- Yu Guohua
- Yen Zhenxing
- Mei Yi-chi
- Luo Jialun
- Hu Shih
- Sun Li-jen

== See also ==
- Shanghai clique
- Generations of Chinese leadership
- Tuanpai
