= Tsinghua Second Gate =

Gate of Tsinghua University, China

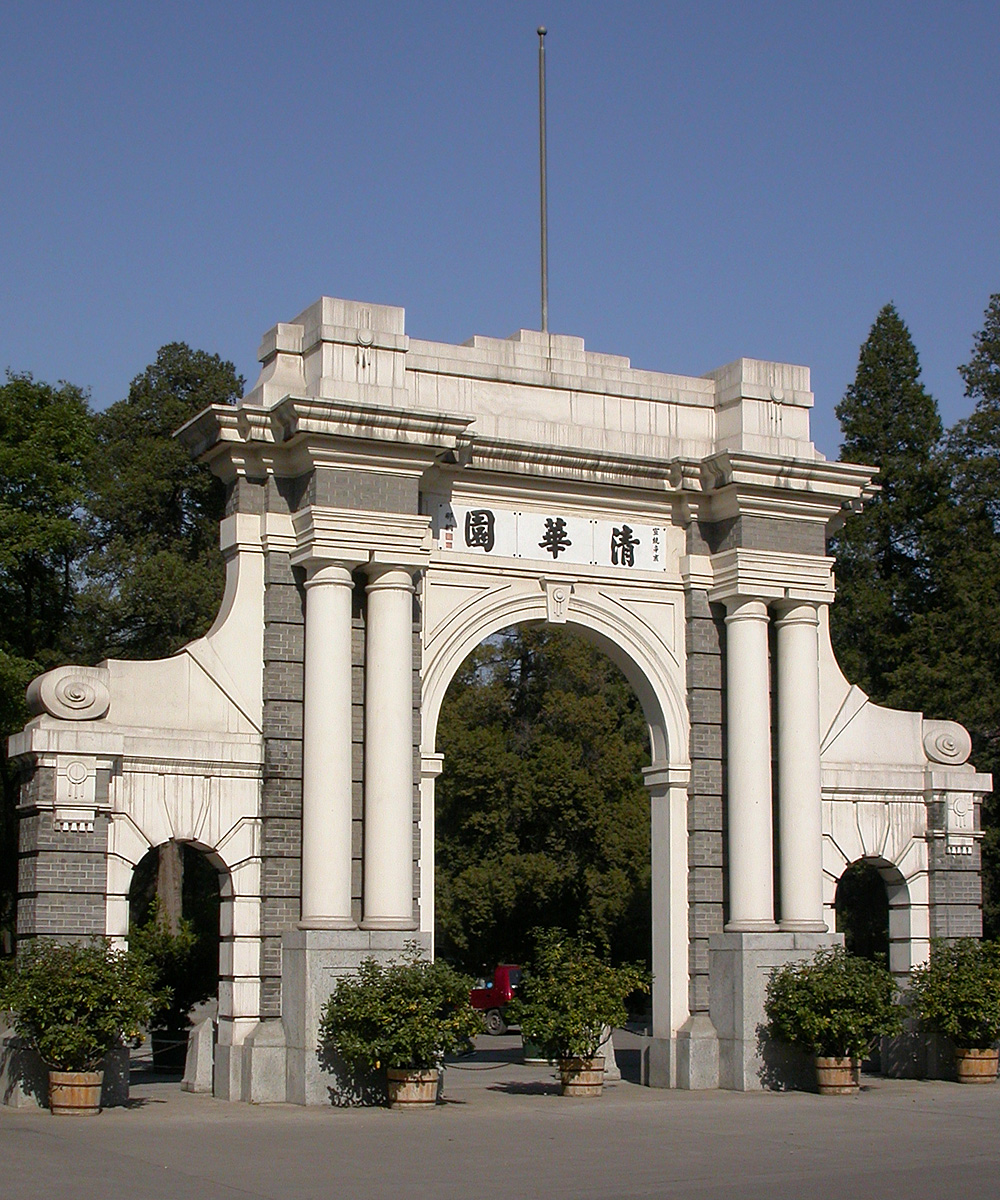
The Second Gate of Tsinghua University

Tsinghua Second Gate is the earliest school gate of Tsinghua University. It was built in 1911. It was torn down in 1966 during the Cultural Revolution and rebuilt in 1991. It is a three-arch stone gate made of blue brick base and white jade. Natong's inscription "Tsinghua Garden" in large characters. Another prominent "old gate" at the Tsinghua University is the West Gate, which was built in 1933.

== Architectural style ==
The Second Gate belongs to the classical western bricklock mechanism, the Baroque style, the green brick pedestal, the white jade, two sides of the intermediate arch, two Taoulk cylinders, the back is the square column. In the middle of the arc, the perfect big arch is engraved with the "Tsinghua Garden", the "Tsinghua Garden", and the font is full. There is a fine small arch side on both sides of the big arch.
