= Tsinghua University =

Public university in Beijing, China

- 清华大学
- Seal of Tsinghua University
- Former name: Tsinghua Imperial College (1911)
- Motto: 自强不息、厚德载物
- Motto in English: Self-Discipline and Social Commitment
- Type: Public
- Established: 29 April 1911; 115 years ago
- Affiliations: C9, AUA, AEARU, APRU, BHUA, CDIO
- Endowment: ~¥6 billion (2023)
- President: Li Luming
- Party Secretary: Qiu Yong
- Total staff: 17,270
- Students: 62,496
- Undergraduates: 16,272
- Postgraduates: 22,605
- Doctoral students: 23,619
- Location: Haidian, Beijing, China; 40.00°N 116.32°E
- Campus: 482.84 hectare; Urban
- Flower: Redbud and Lilac
- Colors: Purple; White
- Website: www.tsinghua.edu.cn

Chinese name
- Traditional Chinese: 清華大學
- Simplified Chinese: 清华大学
Transcriptions
Standard Mandarin
- Hanyu Pinyin: Qīnghuá Dàxué
- Bopomofo: ㄑㄧㄥ ㄏㄨㄚˊ ㄉㄚˋ ㄒㄩㄝˊ
- Wade–Giles: Ch'ing^{1}-hua^{2} Ta^{4}-hsüeh^{2}
- Tongyong Pinyin: Cing-huá Dà-syué
- IPA: [tɕʰíŋ.xwǎ tâ.ɕɥě]
other Mandarin
- Xiao'erjing: چٍڭحُوَا دَاشُوَي
Yue: Cantonese
- Yale Romanization: Chīng-wàah Daaih-hohk
- Jyutping: cing1 waa4 daai6 hok6
- IPA: [tsʰɪŋ˥ wa˩ taj˨ hɔk̚˨]

Tsinghua University (Chinese: 清华大学; pinyin: Qīnghuá Dàxué; THU) is a public research university in Haidian, Beijing, China. It is affiliated with and funded by the Ministry of Education of China. The university is part of the Double First-Class Construction, and was a part of its predecessor initiatives: Project 211 and Project 985. It is also a member of the C9 League.

Tsinghua University's campus is in northwestern Beijing, on the site of the former imperial gardens of the Qing dynasty. The university has 22 schools and 59 departments, with faculties in science, engineering, humanities, law, medicine, history, philosophy, economics, management, education, and art.

Since the university was established in 1911, it has produced notable alumni in science, engineering, politics, business, and academia. These include leaders Xi Jinping, Hu Jintao, and Zhu Rongji, and Nobel Prize in Physics laureate Yang Chen-Ning.

== History ==
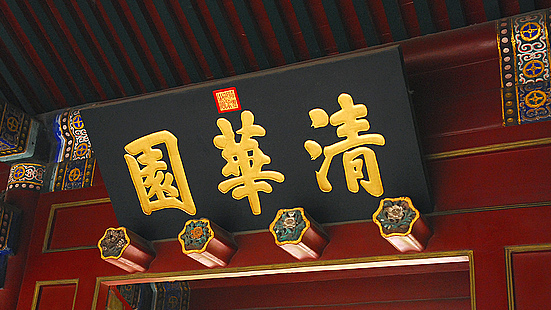
The plaque at the entrance of Tsinghua Garden. The garden is among the oldest components of the campus of Tsinghua University

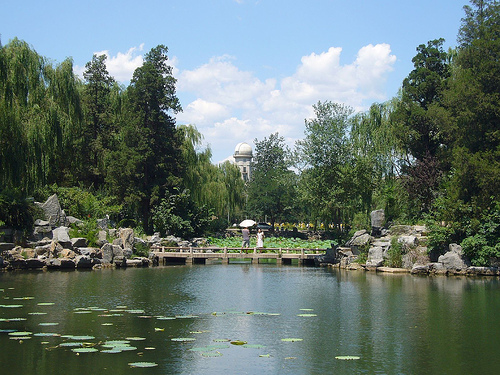
A glimpse of Xichun Garden, a Qing dynasty garden on Tsinghua University campus

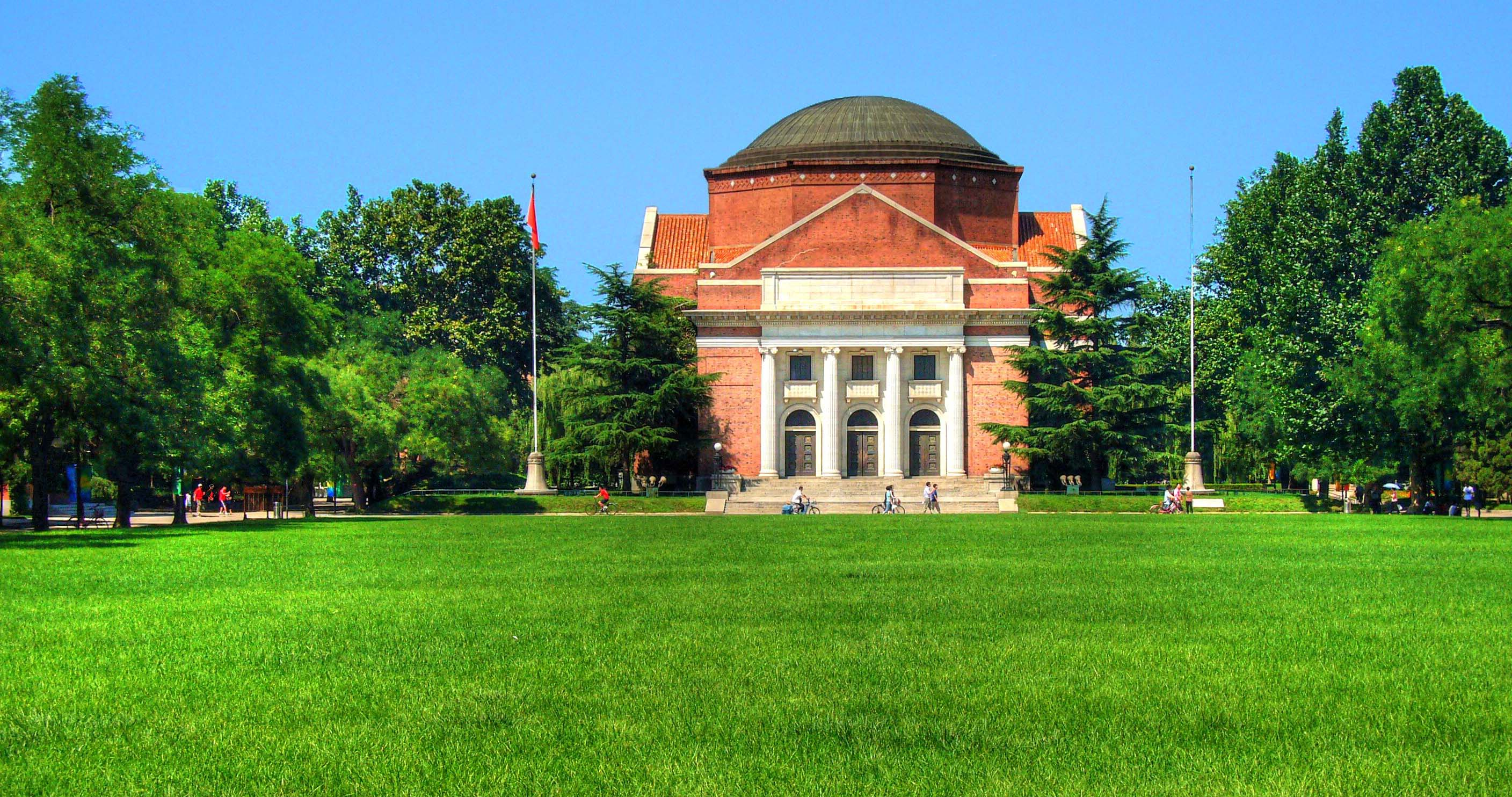
Built in 1917, the Grand Auditorium with its Jeffersonian architectural design is a centerpiece of the old campus

=== Early 20th century (1911–1949) ===
Tsinghua University was established in Beijing during a tumultuous period of national upheaval and conflicts with foreign powers which culminated in the Boxer Rebellion, an uprising against foreign influence in China. After the suppression of the revolt by a foreign alliance including the United States, the ruling Qing dynasty was required to pay indemnities to alliance members. United States Secretary of State John Hay suggested that the US$30 million Boxer indemnity allotted to the United States was excessive. After much negotiation with Qing ambassador Liang Cheng, president of the United States Theodore Roosevelt obtained approval from the United States Congress in 1909 to reduce the indemnity payment by US$10.8 million, on the condition that the funds would be used as scholarships for Chinese students to study in the United States.

Using this fund, the Tsinghua College (清華學堂; Qīnghuá Xuétáng) was established in Beijing, on 29 April 1911 on the site of a former royal garden to serve as a preparatory school for students the government planned to send to the United States. Faculty members for sciences were recruited by the YMCA from the United States, and its graduates transferred directly to American schools as juniors upon graduation. The motto of Tsinghua, "Self-Discipline and Social Commitment", was derived from a 1914 speech by prominent scholar and faculty member Liang Qichao, in which he quoted the I Ching to describe a notion of the ideal gentleman.

In 1925, the school established its own four-year undergraduate program and started a research institute on Chinese studies. In 1928, the school changed its name to National Tsinghua University.

During the Second Sino-Japanese War, many Chinese universities were forced to evacuate their campuses to avoid the Japanese invasion. In 1937, Tsinghua University, Peking University and Nankai University merged to form the National Changsha Temporary University, located in Changsha, Hunan. The merged university later became the National Southwestern Associated University, located in Kunming, Yunnan. The Tsinghua University section of the merged university returned to Beijing at the end of World War II.

=== Later 20th century (post-1949) ===
After the end of the Chinese Civil War in 1949, China experienced a communist revolution leading to the creation of the People's Republic of China. Tsinghua University's then president Mei Yiqi, along with many professors, fled to Taiwan with the retreating Nationalist government. They established the National Tsing Hua Institute of Nuclear Technology in 1955, which later became the National Tsing Hua University in Taiwan, an institution independent and distinct from Tsinghua University.

In 1952, the Chinese Communist Party regrouped the country's higher education institutions in an attempt to build a Soviet-style system where each institution specialized in a certain field of study, such as social sciences or natural sciences. Tsinghua University was streamlined into a polytechnic institute with a focus on engineering and the natural sciences.

In 1953, Tsinghua established a political counselor program, becoming the first university to do so following the Ministry of Education's 1952 directive to begin piloting such programs. New graduates who were also Communist Party members served as political counselors, managing the student body and student organizations, often simultaneously serving as Communist Youth League secretaries. The program was later expanded to other universities following its endorsement by Deng Xiaoping and became further institutionalized across China in the 1990s and 2000s.

During the Third Front construction, Tsinghua established a branch in Mianyang, Sichuan province.

In 1966, the efforts of Tsinghua researchers were critical in China's transition from vacuum-tube computers to fully transistorized computers.

From 1966 to 1976, China experienced immense sociopolitical upheaval and instability during the Cultural Revolution. Many university students walked out of classrooms at Tsinghua and other institutions, and some went on to join the Red Guards, resulting in the complete shutdown of the university as faculty were persecuted or otherwise unable to teach. It was not until 1978, after the Cultural Revolution ended, that the university began to take in students and re-emerge as a force in Chinese politics and society.

During the Criticize Lin, Criticize Confucius campaign of 1973 to 1976, critique groups formed at Tsinghua and Peking University disseminated commentaries under the pseudonym of "Liang Xiao", a homophone for "two schools".

In the 1980s, Tsinghua evolved beyond the polytechnic model and incorporated a multidisciplinary system emphasizing collaboration between distinct schools within the broader university environment. Under this system, several schools have been re-incorporated, including Tsinghua Law School, the School of Economics and Management, the School of Sciences, the School of Life Sciences, the School of Humanities and Social Sciences, the School of Public Policy and Management, and the Academy of Arts and Design.

In 1996, the School of Economics and Management established a partnership with the Sloan School of Management at the Massachusetts Institute of Technology. One year later, Tsinghua and MIT began the MBA program known as the Tsinghua-MIT Global MBA.

In 1998, Tsinghua became the first Chinese university to offer a Master of Laws (LLM) program in American law, through a cooperative venture with the Temple University Beasley School of Law.

=== 21st century ===
Tsinghua alumni include the current General Secretary of the Chinese Communist Party and paramount leader of China, Xi Jinping '79, who graduated with a degree in chemical engineering, along with the CCP General Secretary and former Paramount Leader of China Hu Jintao '64, who graduated with a degree in hydraulic engineering. In addition to its alumni, Tsinghua has a reputation for hosting prominent guest speakers, with international leaders Bill Clinton, Tony Blair, Henry Kissinger, Carlos Ghosn, and Henry Paulson having lectured to the university community.

In November 2010, Tsinghua Xuetang broke out a fire caused by open flames and lodged on the site in breach of regulations, while such a historical building was then under renovation. The accident resulted in no casualties, but the fire gutted the timber roof, floors and staircases of the building's eastern section, an extension completed in the late 1910s. The building was soon afterwards restored before the centenary of the University.

As of 2026, Tsinghua University consists of 22 schools and 59 university departments, 41 research institutes, 35 research centers, and 167 laboratories, including 15 national key laboratories. In September 2006, the Peking Union Medical College, a renowned medical school, was renamed "Peking Union Medical College, Tsinghua University" although it and Tsinghua University are technically separate institutions. The university operates the Tsinghua University Press, which publishes academic journals, textbooks, and other scholarly works.

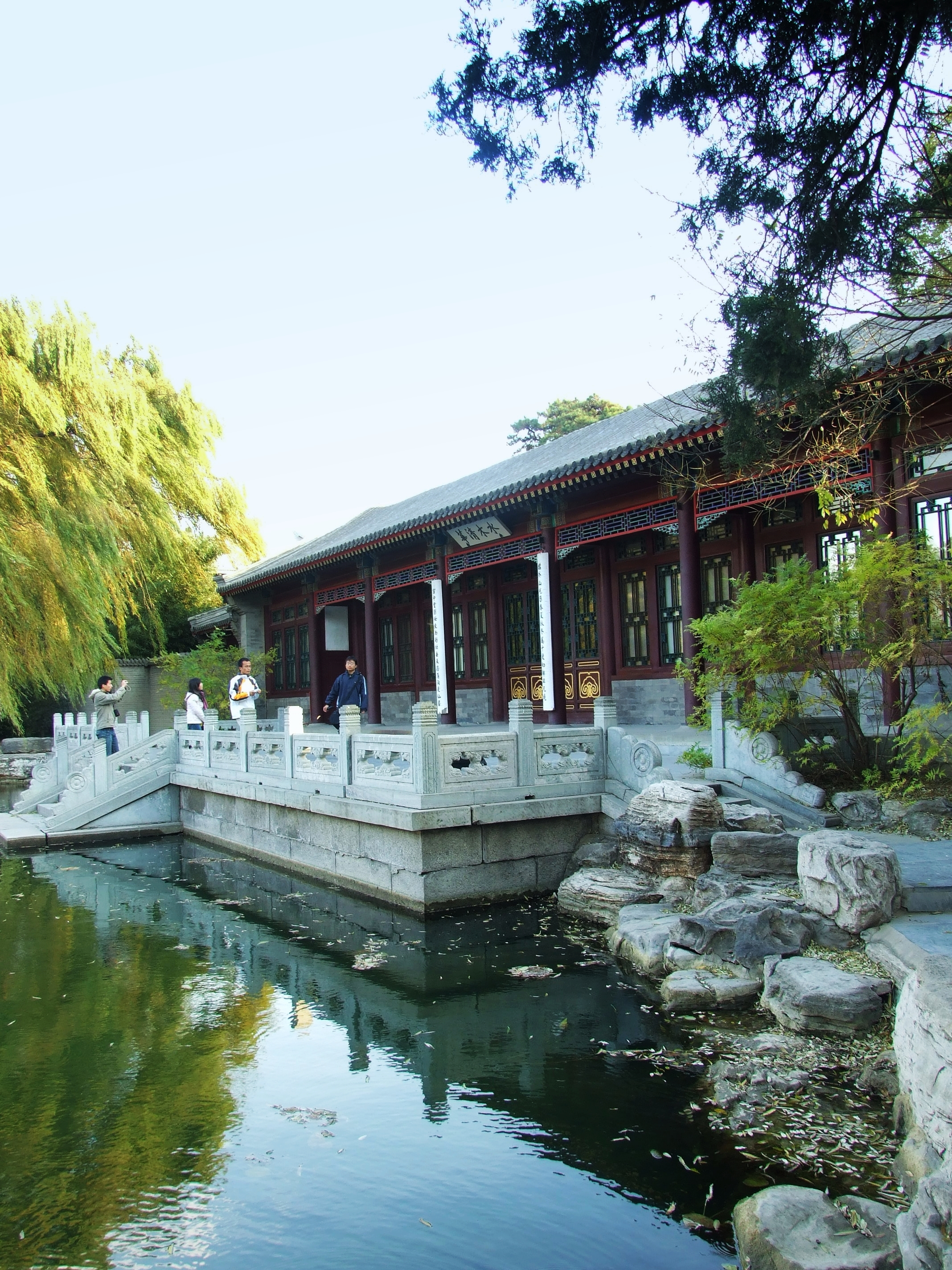
The traditional He Tang Yue Se (moonlit pond) is part of the Qing dynasty Prince's Residence and Garden located on the grounds of Tsinghua University

Through its constituent colleges, graduate and professional schools, and other institutes, Tsinghua University offers more than 82 bachelor's degree programs, 80 master's degree programs and 90 PhD programs.

In 2014, Tsinghua established Xinya College, a residential liberal arts college, as a pilot project to reform undergraduate education at the university. Modeled after universities in the United States and Europe, Xinya combines general and professional education in a liberal arts tradition, featuring a core curriculum of Chinese and Western literature and civilization studies and required courses in physical education and foreign languages. Furthermore, while most Tsinghua undergraduates must choose a specific major upon entrance, Xinya students declare their majors at the end of freshman year, enabling them to explore several different fields of study.

In December 2014, Tsinghua University established the Advisory Committee of Undergraduate Curriculum (ACUC). It became the first student autonomous organization in mainland China for students to participate in the school's management. The Tsinghua University Academic Committee, which was formally established on 8 July 2015, has stipulated in the committee's charter that students should be consulted through the ACUC for resolutions involving undergraduate students. From then on, Tsinghua commenced a new round of academic reform lasting ever since, including establishing GPA grading system, adding the writing classes, critical thinking classes, second foreign languages classes into curriculum, requiring undergrads to be able to swim before graduation, cooperating with the Peking University on class cross-registration to supplement each other's general education curriculum, reducing fees on class withdraw, transcripts and certificates, and adjusting the graduate school co-terminal admission policies.

In 2016, Schwarzman Scholars was established with almost US$400 million endowment by Steven Schwarzman, the chairman and CEO of the Blackstone Group and other multinational corporations and global leaders. Schwarzman Scholars annually selects 100–200 scholars across the world to enroll in a one-year fully funded master's degree leadership program designed to cultivate the next generation of global leaders. 40% students are selected from the United States, 20% students from China, and 40% from rest of the world. These scholars reside on the university campus at Schwarzman College, a residential college built specifically for the program. The college was designed by Robert A. M. Stern and is inspired by traditional British colleges and courtyard houses of China. It was among the first academic buildings in China to receive a LEED gold certification. The building houses students on the third, fourth, and fifth floors, and includes facilities in the basement floors.

In 2016, Tsinghua's expenditures were RMB 13.7 billion (US$3.57 billion at purchasing power parity), the largest budget of any university in China. According to a 2018 Financial Times report, Tsinghua University has been linked to cyber-espionage.

In 2024, Tsinghua announced that its office of the university president had merged into the university's Chinese Communist Party committee, which would directly administer the university henceforth.

== Academics ==
Tsinghua University engages in extensive research and offers 51 bachelor's degree programs, 139 master's degree programs, and 107 doctoral programs through 20 colleges and 57 departments covering a broad range of subjects, including science, engineering, arts and literature, social sciences, law, medicine. Along with its membership in the C9 League, Tsinghua University affiliations include the Association of Pacific Rim Universities, a group of 50 leading Asian and American universities, Washington University in St. Louis's McDonnell International Scholars Academy, a group of 35 premier global universities, and the Association of East Asian Research Universities, a 17-member research collaboration network of top regional institutions. Tsinghua is a member of a Low Carbon Energy University Alliance (LCEUA), together with the University of Cambridge and the Massachusetts Institute of Technology (MIT).

=== Admissions ===
Admission to Tsinghua for both undergraduate and graduate schools is extremely competitive. Undergraduate admissions for domestic students are decided through the gaokao, the Chinese national college entrance exam, which allows students to list Tsinghua University among their preferred college choices. While selectivity varies by province, the sheer number of high school students applying for college each year has resulted in overall acceptance rates far lower than 0.1% of all test takers.

Admission to Tsinghua's graduate schools is also very competitive. Only about 16% of MBA applicants are admitted each year.

=== Research ===
Research at Tsinghua University is mainly supported by government funding from national programs and special projects. In the areas of science and technology, funding from these sources totals over 2 billion yuan, which subsidizes more than 1,400 projects every year conducted by the university. With the prospective increase of state investment in science and technology, research at Tsinghua is projected to receive more financial support from the state.

In 2007, Tsinghua was granted security clearance to conduct classified research of military interest.

Each year, the university hosts the Intellectual Property Summer Institute in cooperation with Franklin Pierce Law Center of Concord, New Hampshire.

The scientific research institutions in Tsinghua University are divided into three categories, including government-approved institutions, institutions independently established by the university and institutions jointly established by the university and independent legal entities outside the university.

As of 31 December 2022, Tsinghua University has 428 university-level scientific research institutions in operation.

=== Rankings and reputation ===
==== General ranking ====
University rankings

Global – Overall
- ARWU World: 18 (2025)
- QS World: 14 (2027)
- QS Employability: 6 (2022)
- THE World: 11 (2027)
- THE Reputation: 8 (2025)
- USNWR Global: 6 (2026–27)

Regional – Overall
- ARWU Asia: 1 (2023)
- QS Asia: 3 (2023)
- QS BRICS: 1 (2019)
- THE Asia: 1 (2023)
- THE Emerging Economies: 2 (2022)
- USNWR Asia: 1 (2026–27)

National – Overall
- BCUR National: 1 (2023)
- QS National: 1 (2019)
- THE National: 1 (2023)
- USNWR National: 1 (2026–27)

Tsinghua University ranked No. 1 in China, the whole of Asia-Oceania region and emerging countries according to the Times Higher Education, with its industry income, research, and teaching performance indicator placed at 1st, 5th and 7th respectively in the world. Internationally, Tsinghua was regarded as the most reputable Chinese university by the Times Higher Education World Reputation Rankings where, it has ranked 8th globally and 1st in the Asia-Pacific.

Tsinghua University ranked 10th among Global Innovative Universities according to the World's Universities with Real Impact (WURI) 2020 ranking released by United Nations Institute for Training and Research (UNITAR).

Since 2013, Tsinghua also topped the newly created regional QS BRICS University Rankings. Tsinghua graduates are highly desired worldwide; in the QS Graduate Employability Rankings 2017, Tsinghua was ranked 3rd in the world and 1st in the whole of Afro-Eurasia & Oceania region. In 2020, Tsinghua was ranked 15th in the world by QS World University Rankings, and ranked 6th globally and 1st in Asia in the QS Graduate Employability Rankings.

As of 2026, the U.S. News & World Report ranked Tsinghua at 1st in the Asia-Pacific and 6th globally in its 2026-2027 Best Global Universities Rankings. The Academic Ranking of World Universities, also known as the "Shanghai Ranking", placed Tsinghua University 18th in the world and 1st in Asia & Oceania region.

Tsinghua was the best-ranked university in the Asia-Pacific and the 12th worldwide in 2025/2026 in terms of aggregate performance by the four widely observed university rankings (THE+ARWU+QS+US News), as reported by the BlueSky Ranking of University Rankings.

==== Research performance ====
As of 2024, it ranked 3rd among the universities around the world by SCImago Institutions Rankings. The Nature Index 2025 Annual Tables by Nature Research ranked Tsinghua 6th among the leading universities globally for the high quality of research publications in natural science.

For sciences in general, the 2026 CWTS Leiden Ranking ranked Tsinghua University 2nd in the world after Harvard University based on the number of their scientific publications belonging to the top 1% in their fields. In November 2024, Clarivate Analytics ranked Tsinghua 2nd in Afro-Eurasia & Oceania regions after Chinese Academy of Sciences (CAS) and 4th in the world after (CAS, Harvard, and Stanford) for most cited researchers.

==== Subjects rankings ====
As of 2021, it ranked 6th globally in "Education", 7th in "Clinical, pre-clinical and Health", 11th in "Business and Economics", 12th in "Computer Science", 13th in "Life Science", 17th in "Engineering and Technology", 18th in "Physical Science", 33rd in "Social Science", 37th in "Law", and 40th in "Arts and Humanities" by the Times Higher Education Rankings by Subjects, which are historical strengths for Tsinghua.

Since 2015, Tsinghua University has overtaken the Massachusetts Institute of Technology to top the list of Best Global Universities for Engineering published by the U.S. News & World Report and as of 2024, it also ranked number one globally in 9 subjects: "Artificial Intelligence", "Chemical Engineering", "Chemistry", "Computer Science", "Energy and Fuels", "Engineering", "Environment Engineering", "Environment/Ecology" and "Material Science".

As of 2024, the U.S. News & World Report also placed "Civil Engineering", "Condensed Matter Physics", "Electrical and Electronic Engineering", "Geosciences", "Green and Sustainable Science and Technology", "Mechanical Engineering", "Meteorology and Atmospheric Sciences", "Nanoscience and Nanotechnology", "Optics", "Physical Chemistry", "Physics" and "Water Resources" at Tsinghua in the global Top 10 universities.

In the ARWU's Global Ranking of Academic Subjects 2020, Tsinghua ranks in the world's top five universities in "Telecommunication Engineering", "Instruments Science & Technology", "Civil Engineering", "Chemical Engineering", "Mechanical Engineering", "Nanoscience & Nanotechnology", "Energy Science & Engineering", and "Transportation Science & Technology" and falls within the global top 10 for "Electrical & Electronic Engineering", "Computer Science & Engineering", "Materials Science & Engineering", "Environmental Science & Engineering", and "Water Resources".

QS World University Rankings by Subject 2024
Subject	Global	National
Arts & Humanities	▲36	2
Linguistics	▼ =84	▲4
Archaeology	151–200	5–6
Architecture and Built Environment	8	1
Art and Design	▼24	3
English Language and Literature	▼ =83	2
History	101–150	3–5
Art History	5	1
Modern Languages	▼37	3
Philosophy	▼101–150	▲3
Engineering and Technology	▼11	1
Engineering – Chemical	12	1
Engineering – Civil and Structural	▲6	1
Computer Science and Information Systems	▲ =11	1
Engineering – Electrical and Electronic	▲12	1
Engineering – Mechanical	▲13	1
Life Sciences & Medicine	▲ =64	▲2
Anatomy and Physiology	▲ =45	▼4
Biological Sciences	▲24	1
Medicine	▲ =61	▲2
Pharmacy and Pharmacology	▲ =35	2
Psychology	▲ =82	2
Natural Sciences	▲16	▲1
Chemistry	▲13	▲1
Earth and Marine Sciences	▼ =35	1–2
Environmental Sciences	▼10	1
Geography	▼45	2
Geology	▼35	▼3
Geophysics	▼ =32	▼2
Materials Sciences	▼12	1
Mathematics	▲ =21	1
Physics and Astronomy	▲13	1
Social Sciences & Management	▲22	2
Accounting and Finance	▲25	2
Business and Management Studies	▲24	1
Communication and Media Studies	▼51–100	1–2
Development Studies	51–100	1–2
Economics and Econometrics	▲22	2
Education and Training	▼ =28	▼3
Hospitality and Leisure Management	101–150	4–5
Law and Legal Studies	▼33	2
Marketing	21–50	1
Politics	▲37	▲1
Social Policy and Administration	▼51–100	2–4
Sociology	▼ =63	▲2
Sports–Related Subjects	101–140	2–4
Statistics and Operational Research	▲ =16	1

THE World University Rankings by Subject 2024
Subject	Global	National
Arts & humanities	▲34	2
Business & economics	8	1
Clinical & health	▼14	1
Computer science	▲12	1
Education	7	1
Engineering	15	2
Law	33	1
Life sciences	▼ =12	1–2
Physical sciences	▲14	▲1
Social sciences	21	▼2

ARWU Global Ranking of Academic Subjects 2023
Subject	Global	National
Natural Sciences
Mathematics	▲38	▼3
Physics	▲23	▼2
Chemistry	▲8	2
Earth Sciences	▲51–75	▼9–11
Geography	101–150	9–16
Ecology	▼201–300	▼10–16
Oceanography	▲76–100	▲12–13
Atmospheric Science	▼27	▼6
Engineering
Mechanical Engineering	▲4	3
Electrical & Electronic Engineering	▲4	1
Automation & Control	▲16	▲6
Telecommunication Engineering	▼6	▼5
Instruments Science & Technology	▼8	▼8
Biomedical Engineering	▲14	▲9
Computer Science & Engineering	▲3	1
Civil Engineering	▼6	▼4
Chemical Engineering	▼3	▼2
Materials Science & Engineering	▲4	1
Nanoscience & Nanotechnology	▼2	▼2
Energy Science & Engineering	1	1
Environmental Science & Engineering	▲2	1
Water Resources	▲5	▼5
Biotechnology	▲7	4
Aerospace Engineering	▲4	▲4
Marine/Ocean Engineering	▲16	▲12
Transportation Science & Technology	3	▼3
Remote Sensing	▼14	▼8
Mining & Mineral Engineering	▼25	▼18
Metallurgical Engineering	▼18	▼12
Textile Science and Engineering	29	18
Life Sciences
Biological Sciences	▲49	1
Human Biological Sciences	▼151–200	▼9–12
Medical Sciences
Clinical Medicine	301–400	▲10–15
Public Health	▲101–150	▲9–13
Medical Technology	101–150	▼4–11
Social Sciences
Economics	▲41	▼2
Statistics	▲47	▲3
Political Sciences	▲151–200	1–3
Psychology	301–400	▼13–19
Business Administration	▲76–100	▲6–7
Finance	▲35	▼6
Management	▲16	▲2
Public Administration	▲25	3
Library & Information Science	▼21	3

=== List of university departments and institutions ===
School	Department	Building
Humanities	Chinese Language and Literature	Xin Zhai
Humanities	Philosophy	Xin Zhai
Humanities	History	Text north floor
Humanities	Foreign Languages and Literatures	Wennan floor
Humanities	History of Science	Meng Minwei Humanities Building
Social Sciences	Sociology	Xiong Zhixing Building
Social Sciences	Psychology	Weiqing House
Social Sciences	Political Science	Ming Zhai
Social Sciences	International Relations	Ming Zhai
Social Sciences	Institute of Economics	Ming Zhai
Social Sciences	Institute of Science, Technology and Society	Ming Zhai
Economics and Management	Accounting	Weilun Building
Economics and Management	Economics	Weilun Building
Economics and Management	Finance	Weilun Building
Economics and Management	Marketing	Weilun Building
Economics and Management	Management Science and Engineering	Weilun Building
Economics and Management	Innovation and Entrepreneurship	Weilun Building
Information Science and Technology	Electronic Engineering	Rohm Building
Information Science and Technology	Microelectronics and Nanoelectronics	East Main Building of Tsinghua University
Information Science and Technology	Computer Science and Technology	East Main Building of Tsinghua University
Information Science and Technology	Software	East Main Building of Tsinghua University
Information Science and Technology	Automation	Main Building of Tsinghua University
Information Science and Technology	Research Institute of Information Technology	Information Science and Technology Building
Information Science and Technology	Institute for Network Sciences and Cyberspace	Information Science and Technology Building
Tsinghua PBC School of Finance

School	Department	Building
Academy of Arts and Design	Art History	Art college building
Academy of Arts and Design	Industrial Design	Art college building
Academy of Arts and Design	Environmental Art Design	Art college building
Academy of Arts and Design	Ceramic Design	Art college building
Academy of Arts and Design	Visual Communication Design	Art college building
Academy of Arts and Design	Textile and Fashion Design	Art college building
Academy of Arts and Design	Information Art and Design	Art college building
Academy of Arts and Design	Art and Crafts	Art college building
Academy of Arts and Design	Painting	Art college building
Academy of Arts and Design	Sculpture	Art college building
Sciences	Mathematical Sciences	Science Building
Sciences	Physics	Science Building
Sciences	Chemistry	Ho Tim Building
Sciences	Earth System Science	Meng Minwei Technology Building
Civil Engineering	Civil Engineering	Ho Sin-Hang Building
Civil Engineering	Construction Management	Ho Sin-Hang Building
Civil Engineering	Hydraulic Engineering	New Hydraulic museum
Environment	Environmental Engineering	Environmental energy saving building
Environment	Environmental Sciences	Environmental energy saving building
Environment	Environmental Planning and Management	Environmental energy saving building
Journalism and Communication		Omnicom Building
Law		Ming Li Building
Electrical Engineering		Main Building of Tsinghua University
School of Public Policy and Management (Note: Purple represents the college without an undergraduate.)		Wu Shunde Building
Shenzhen International Graduate School

School	Department	Building
Aerospace Engineering	Aeronautical and Astronautical Engineering	Meng Minwei Technology Building
Aerospace Engineering	Engineering Mechanics	Meng Minwei Technology Building
Mechanical Engineering	Mechanical Engineering	Lee Shau Kee Technology Building
Mechanical Engineering	Precision Instrument	Zeng Xianzi House
Mechanical Engineering	Precision Instrument	Power Machinery Museum
Mechanical Engineering	Automotive Engineering	Automotive Building
Mechanical Engineering	Industrial Engineering	Shunde Building
Medicine	Basic Medical Sciences	Medical Science Building
Medicine	Biomedical Engineering	Medical Science Building
Medicine	Clinical Medicine	Medical Science Building
Medicine	Research Center for Public Health	Medical Science Building
Pharmaceutical Sciences		Medical Science Building
Architecture	Architecture	Leung Kui Ju Museum
Architecture	Urban Planning and Design	Leung Kui Ju Museum
Architecture	Building Science	Leung Kui Ju Museum
Architecture	Landscape Architecture	Leung Kui Ju Museum
Institute for Interdisciplinary Information Sciences		Information Science and Technology Building
Materials Science and Engineering		Yifu Technology Science Building
Life Sciences		Life Science Museum
Engineering Physics		Liu Qing Building
Chemical Engineering		Yingshi Building
Marxism		Shan Zhai

=== Department of Industrial Engineering ===
Department of Industrial Engineering (Tsinghua IE) has three institutes:

- Operations Research & Data Science
- System Operation and Digital Management
- Human Factors and Human-System Interaction

The department also operates three university-level multi-disciplinary application-oriented institutes or centers:

- Institute of Quality and Reliability
  - Established jointly by Tsinghua University and State Administration for Market Regulation
- Institute of Industrial Culture
  - Established jointly by Tsinghua University and Ministry of Industry and Information Technology
- Center for Smart Logistics and Supply Chain Management
  - Established jointly by Tsinghua University and Jiaozhou City at Qingdao City, Shandong Province.

=== Department of Mathematical Sciences ===
The Department of Mathematical Sciences (DMS) was established in 1927.

In 1952, Tsinghua DMS was merged with the Peking University Department of Mathematical Sciences. Then in 1979 it was renamed "Department of Applied Mathematics", and renamed again in 1999 to its current title.

Tsinghua DMS has three institutes at present, the institute of Pure Mathematics which has 27 faculty members, the Institute of Applied Mathematics and Probability and Statistics which has 27 faculty members, and the Institute of Computational Mathematics and Operations Research which has 20 faculty members. There are currently about 400 undergraduate students and 200 graduate students.

=== Department of Precision Instrument ===
The Department of Precision Instrument was called the Department of Precision Instrument and Machine Manufacturing in 1960 when it was separated out from the Department of Machine Manufacturing to be an independent department. Later, in 1971, it was renamed the Department of Precision Instrument. The mission of the Department of Precision Instrument at Tsinghua University, as its dean said, is "supporting the national development and improving the people's well-being."

==== Research ====
Research in the Department of Precision Instrument is divided into four main parts, led by its four research institutes: the Institute of Opto-electronic Engineering, the Institute of Instrument Science and Technology, the Engineering Research Center for Navigation Technology, and the Center for Photonics and Electronics. At the same time, the Department of Precision Instrument has three key laboratories: the State Key Laboratory of Tribology, the State Key Laboratory of Precision Measurement Technology and Instruments, and the Key Laboratory of High-accuracy Inertial Instrument and System. It also has two national engineering research centers, which are the National Engineering Research Center of Optical Disk and the CIMS National Engineering Research Center.

The Institute of Opto-electronic Engineering
The Institute of Opto-electronic Engineering (IOEE) was established in 1958. It obtained the Chinese government's authorization to offer PhD program in 1981 and the approval to build the post-doctoral research site in 1988. The research of the IOEE covers opto-electronic instruments, precision metrology and measurement, modern optical information processing, the theory and components of binary optics, and the birefringent frequency-splitting lasers. Several famous scientists work in the IOEE, including Professor Guofan Jin, an academician of the Chinese Academy of Engineering, and Professor Kegong Zhao, formerly the president of the Chinese National Institute of Metrology.

The Institute of Instrument Science and Technology
The Institute of Instrument Science and Technology is the most important institute in the State Key Laboratory of Precision Measuring Technology and Instrument Science at Tsinghua University. The institute is equipped with advanced instruments and facilities, and its research has included every major area in modern instrument science and technology. Up to 2012, the institute had produced over 1,500 publications, more than 100 patents, and acquired many significant awards.

The Engineering Research Center for Navigation Technology
The Engineering Research Center for Navigation Technology is a relatively young institute in the Department of Precision Instrument which was established in 2000, with the intention to "[pursue] excellence in the research and development in the field of high-accuracy inertial instruments and navigation technology, as well as in MEMS inertial sensor fields, and to provide advanced training for future scientists and engineers in the field of inertial technology." Its research interests cover high-accuracy inertial instruments and navigation technology, MEMS inertial sensors and systems, and precise electro-mechanical control systems and their application. As of 2012, the area of the center is 2,900 square meters, including approximately 550 square meters of clean rooms. Equipment and instruments in this center are worth over 50 million RMB (US$7.56 million).

The Center for Photonics and Electronics
The Center for Photonics and Electronics works on advanced laser and photonic technology. It houses 200 square meters of clean rooms and very modern laser instruments and equipment. The research of this Center covers solid-state laser technology, fiber laser technology, active optics technology, and laser detection technology. The center has published more than 100 scientific papers including 40 indexed by SCI, has 18 national patents, and also frequently exchange visits and academic conferences with foreign scholars.

The SKLT has one central laboratory and four sub-laboratories. It has been awarded numerous awards, including "two National Natural Science Awards, two National Invention Awards, one National Award for Science and Technology Progress, two National Excellent Science Book Awards, 25 awards from ministries or provinces of China, Edmond E. Bisson Award in 2003 from STLE, the 2008 PE Publishing Prize by the Editor and Editorial Board of the Journal of Engineering Tribology." Moreover, China's Ministry of Education recognized the SKLT as one of the creative groups in 2005, and the National Natural Science Foundation of China recognized the SKLT as one of the creative research groups in 2007. The Tribology Science Fund of the Key Laboratory of Tribology cooperates with National Natural Science Foundation of China in founding research projects in various applied sciences and technologies.

==== Education ====
Currently, there are two disciplines in the Department of Precision Instrument: the discipline of the instrumental science and technology of precision instrument and mechanology and the discipline of optical engineering.

There are six teaching laboratories or centers which serve significant roles in undergraduate and graduate education in the Department of Precision Instrument. They are:

1. The Teaching Lab of Manufacturing Engineering
2. The CAD Teaching Centre
3. The Engineering Graphics Teaching Laboratory
4. The Creative Machine Design Teaching Laboratory
5. The Experimentation Teaching Center for Measurement and Control Technology
6. The Teaching Laboratory of Optics and Length Measurement

The department provides more than 40 courses of the undergraduate level and 25 courses of the graduate level.

=== School of Life Sciences ===
School of Life Sciences was first established in 1926 under the name Department of Biology. Botanist Qian Chongshu took up the first dean.

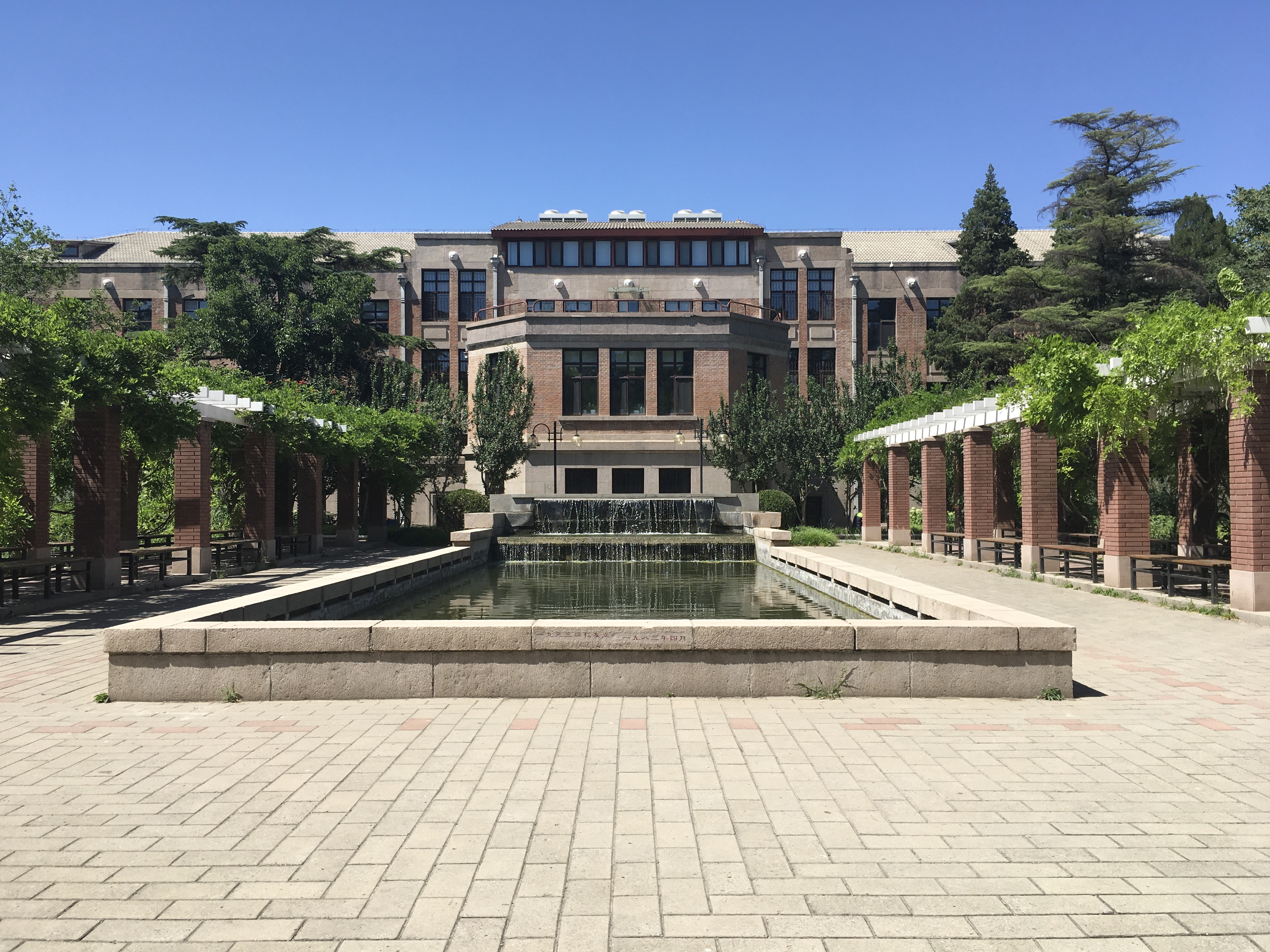
Old building of the School of Life Sciences, the Tsinghua Biology Hall

During the nationwide reorganization of universities in the early 1950s, the Department of Biology was merged into other universities, namely Peking University etc., resulting in a vacancy in the field of biological research in Tsinghua for almost 30 years.

In June 1984, decisions were made about the reestablishment of the Department of Biology, and the department officially reopened in September. During the reestablishment the Department of Biology of Peking University, the Institute of Biophysics of Chinese Academy of Sciences, and many other institutes as well as biologists provided valuable support and help. The department changed its name to the current name in September 2009. As of 2013, structural biologist and foreign associate of National Academy of Sciences of United States Dr. Wang Hongwei (王宏伟) is the current dean of School of Life Sciences. The school currently has 129 professors and employees, around 600 undergraduates (including the candidates of Tsinghua University – Peking Union Medical College joint MD program).

=== Peking Union Medical College ===
The Tsinghua Bell

The Peking Union Medical College was established in 1917 by the Rockefeller Foundation and was modeled on the US medical education system. Tsinghua first established its medical school in 2001 and in 2006, Tsinghua's medical school merged with the Peking Union Medical College renaming it "Peking Union Medical College, Tsinghua University". The school remains the top ranked medical school and general hospital in China according to CUCAS in 2015. The Peking Union Medical College is also the only medical school to be affiliated with the Chinese Academy of Medical Sciences. It runs one of the most competitive medical programs in the country, accepting 90 students a year into its 8-year MD program. Students in the 8-year program spend 2.5 years at Tsinghua studying premedical education before moving onto Peking Union Medical College to complete the last 5.5 years in clinical medicine, basic medical education and research.

=== School of Economics and Management ===
The School of Economics and Management dates back to 1926, when Tsinghua University established its Faculty of Economics.

=== School of Journalism and Communication ===
The Tsinghua School of Journalism and Communication (TSJC) was established in April 2002. Its predecessor was Communication Studies in the Department of Chinese Language and Literature and its establishment coincided with the development of media increasingly influencing world affairs in a time of fast-growing globalization. The school's research fields include International Communication, Film and Television Studies, New Media Studies, Media Operation and Management, and Business Journalism and are based on comprehensive academic research in journalism and communication theories. The objective of the school is to bring full advantage of Tsinghua University's comprehensive academic structure to Chinese and international media, to construct a first-rate discipline in journalism and communication studies, to cultivate talented professionals in the field and to explore advanced concepts in journalism and communication. The school also offers a two-year graduate program in international business journalism, sponsored by Bloomberg L.P. and the International Center for Journalists (ICFJ), that trains talented students and media professionals from around the globe in financial media and corporate communication.

The school has five research-oriented centers to organize and conduct academic research activities. They are: Center for International Communications Studies, Center for New Media Studies, Center for Film and Television Studies, Center for Media Management Studies and Center for Cultural Industry Studies.

=== School of Law ===
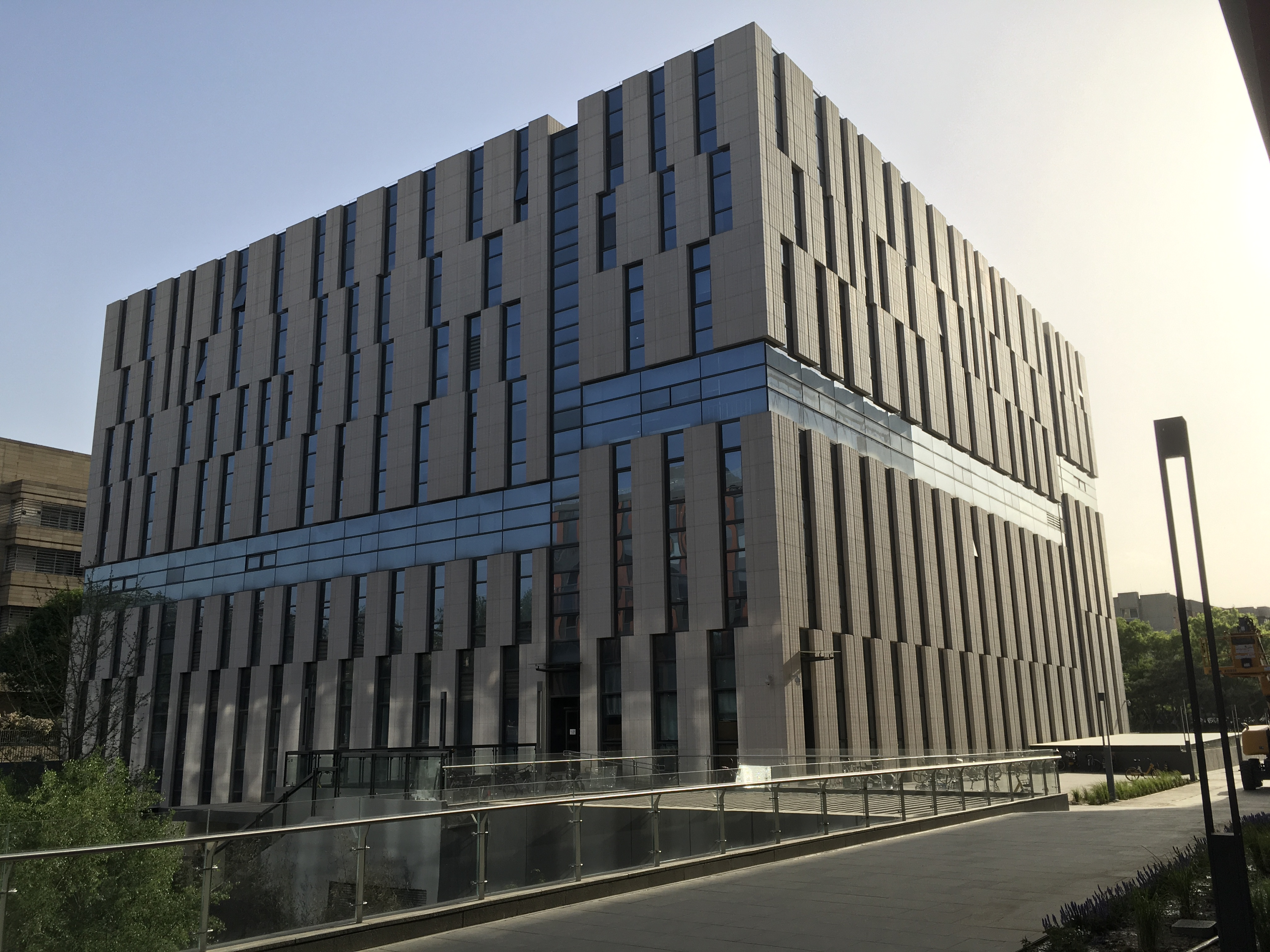
The Law Library at the Tsinghua University, a branch library of the Tsinghua University Library system

The legal studies at Tsinghua University can be dated back to the "Tsinghua College" era (1911–1929), when many students were sent to universities in western countries for legal studies. Graduating from institutions such as Columbia, Yale, and Harvard, those Tsinghua alumni have played an important role in areas of law and diplomacy. Famous legal scholars Tuan-Sheng Ch'ien, Yan Shutang (燕树棠), Wang Huacheng (王化成), Kung Chuan Hsiao (萧公权), Pu Xuefeng (浦薛凤), Mei Ju'ao (梅汝璈), Xiang Zhejun (向哲浚) and diplomat Tang Yueliang (唐悦良) are all graduates from Tsinghua College or went to study abroad after passing exams in Tsinghua College.

Tsinghua University School of Law was established in 1929 after Tsinghua College was renamed Tsinghua University. Legal education in Tsinghua University at the time focused on international affairs and Chinese legal studies. Courses on political science and economics could also be found on students' curriculum. Before the Japanese army invaded Beijing in 1937, the School of Law developed greatly. Many Chinese legal scholars graduated during that era, including Wang Tieya (王铁崖), Gong Xiangrui (龚祥瑞) and Lou Bangyan (楼邦彦).

In 1952, in response to the government policy of turning Tsinghua University into an engineering-focused university, the law school was disbanded; the faculty were appointed to other universities, including Peking University and Peking College of Political Science and Law (the predecessor of China University of Political Science and Law). Until 1995, there was no formal "school of law" at Tsinghua University, yet courses on law were still taught in Tsinghua University from the early 1980s.

On 8 September 1995, the Tsinghua University Department of Law was formally re-established; on 25 April 1999, the 88th anniversary of Tsinghua University, the university formally changed the department into the "School of Law". The "new" law school was similar to the "old" law school and has tried to add international factors to its students' curriculum. Due to the efforts of its faculty members and students, the Tsinghua University School of Law has become one of the leading law schools in China and since 2011, has been consistently ranked as the best or the second-best law school in mainland China by QS World University Rankings.

=== Graduate School at Shenzhen ===
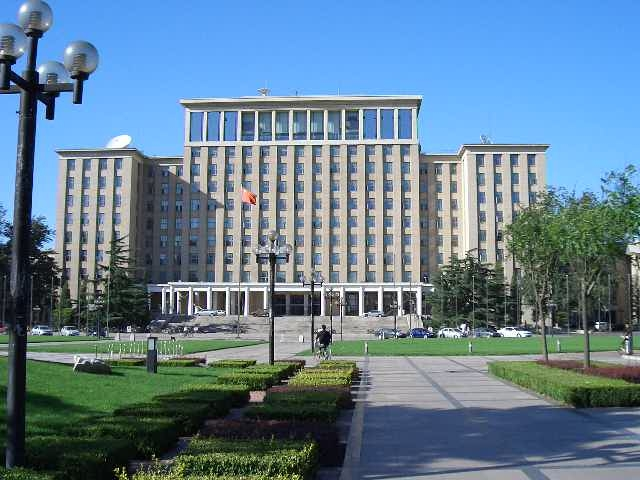
A main building that was built in the 1950s

The Graduate School at Shenzhen was jointly founded by Tsinghua University and the Shenzhen Municipal Government. The school is directly affiliated with Tsinghua University in Beijing. The campus is located in the University Town of Shenzhen since 18 October 2003. The Graduate School at Shenzhen, Tsinghua University, was jointly founded by Tsinghua University and the Shenzhen Municipal Government for cultivating top level professionals and carrying out scientific and technological innovations. The academic divisions are the following:

- Division of Life Science and Health
- Division of Energy and Environment
- Division of Information Science and Technology
- Division of Logistics and Transportation
- Division of Advanced Manufacturing
- Division of Social Sciences and Management
- Division of Ocean Science and Technology

== Campus ==
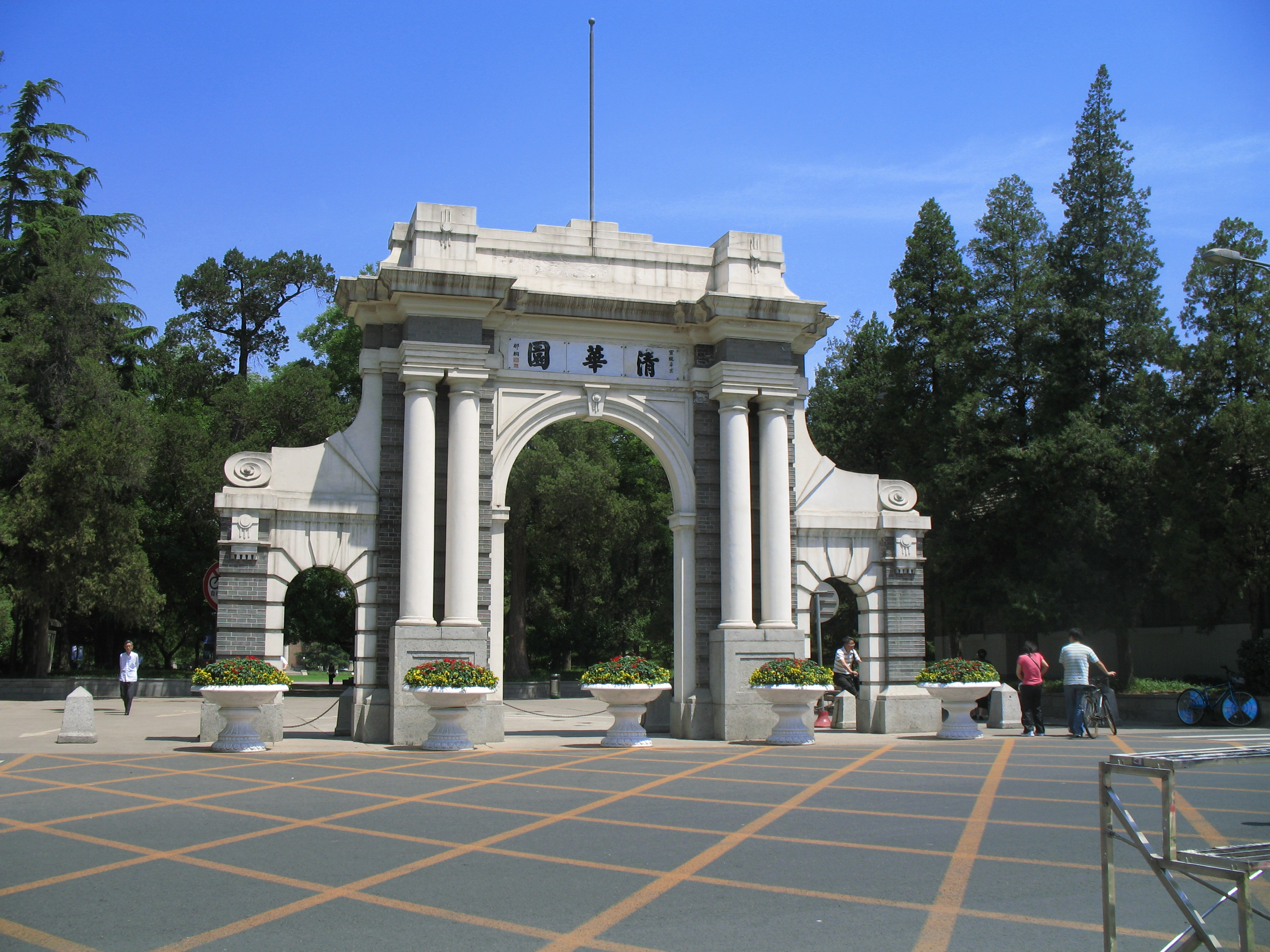
The Second Gate is a landmark on the Tsinghua University campus

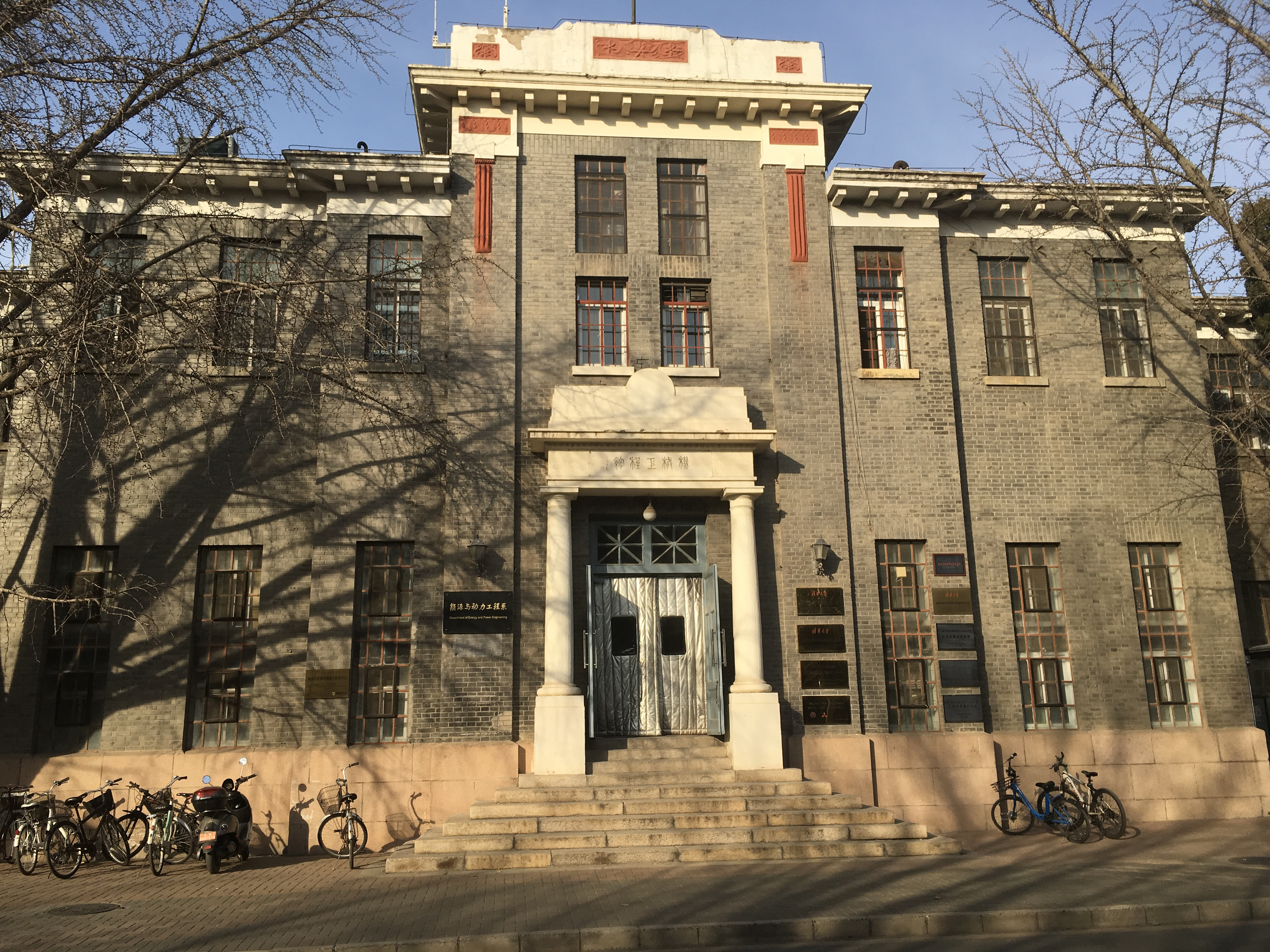
The Mechanical Engineering Hall

The campus of Tsinghua University is located in northwest Beijing, in the Haidian district. Tsinghua University's campus was named one of the most beautiful college campuses in the world by a panel of architects and campus designers in Forbes in 2010; it was the only university in Asia on the list.

Numerous architects were involved in the designing of buildings on the campus. American architect Henry Killam Murphy (1877–1954), a Yale graduate, designed the Grand Auditorium, the Roosevelt Memorial Gymnasium, the Science Building and the east side of the Old Library. Yang Tingbao designed the Observatory, the Life Sciences building, the Mingzhai of the student dormitory buildings and the middle and west side of the Old Library. Shen Liyuan designed the Mechanical Engineering Hall, the Chemistry Hall and the Aviation Hall. Zhuang Jun designed the Civil Engineering Hall, Zhaolan Yuan, and the West Dormitories. T. Chuang, a 1914 graduate of the University of Illinois at Urbana–Champaign, helped design the campus grounds of the Tsinghua University with influences of Neoclassical and Palladian architectural styles and architectures. Zhang Bo designed the Shengyinyuan. Other notable 20th-century Chinese architects such as Li Daozeng, Zhou Weiquan, Wang Guoyu and Guan Zhaoye have all designed various buildings on the Tsinghua University campus.

The university's Institute of Nuclear and New Energy Technology is on a separate campus in a northern suburb of Beijing.

The Tsinghua History Museum covers a construction area of 5,060 m^{2}. A collection of old documents, pictures, artworks, maps, graphics, videos and music tells the visitors the history of Tsinghua University. The exhibition also pays tribute to the people who contributed to the development of the institution. The university also operates its own art museum, the Tsinghua University Art Museum, which derives its collection from the university's Academy of Arts & Design since 1956.

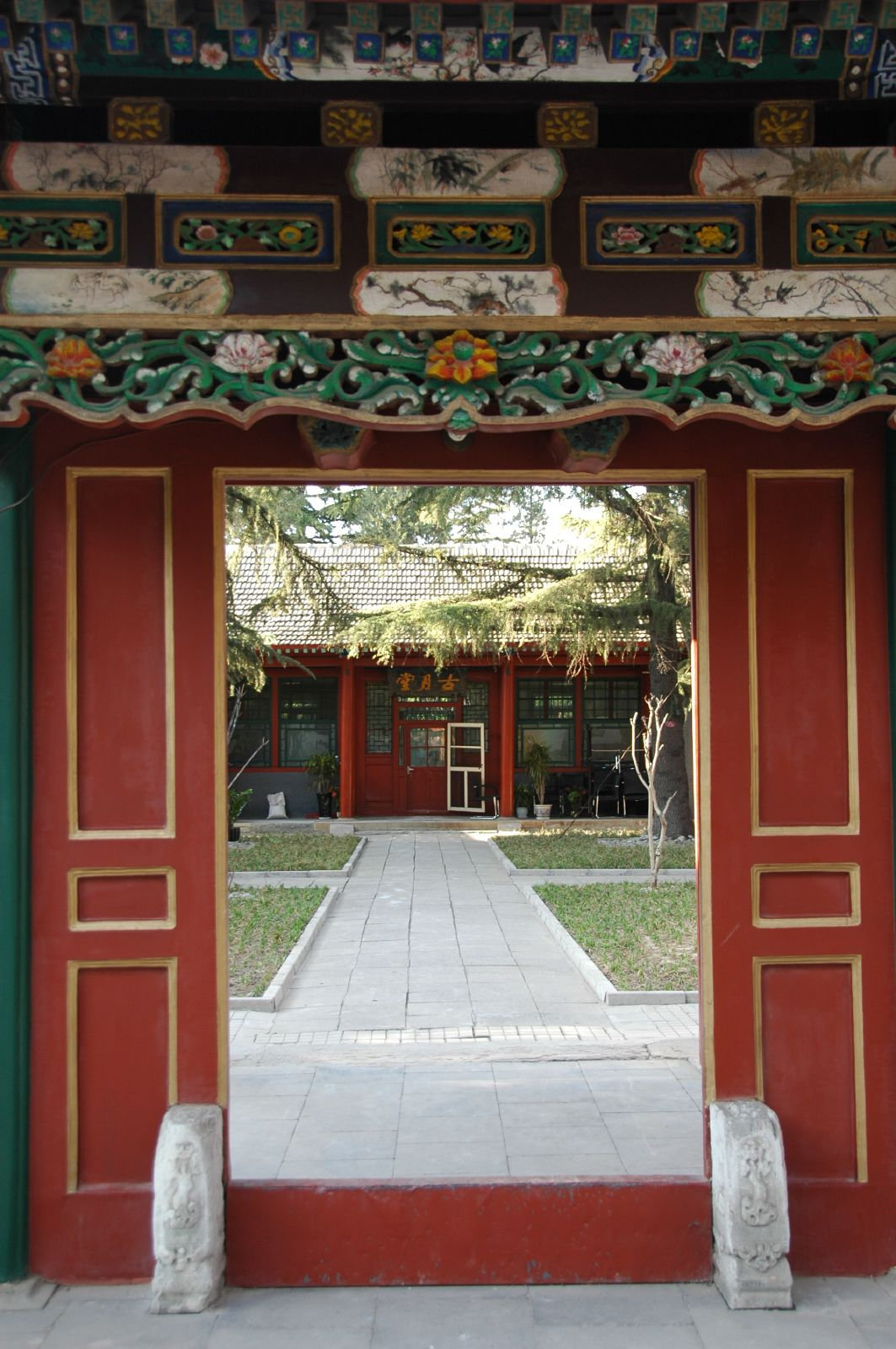
Entrance to "工 Shape Hall", the former Qing Prince's Mansion and the current office of the president

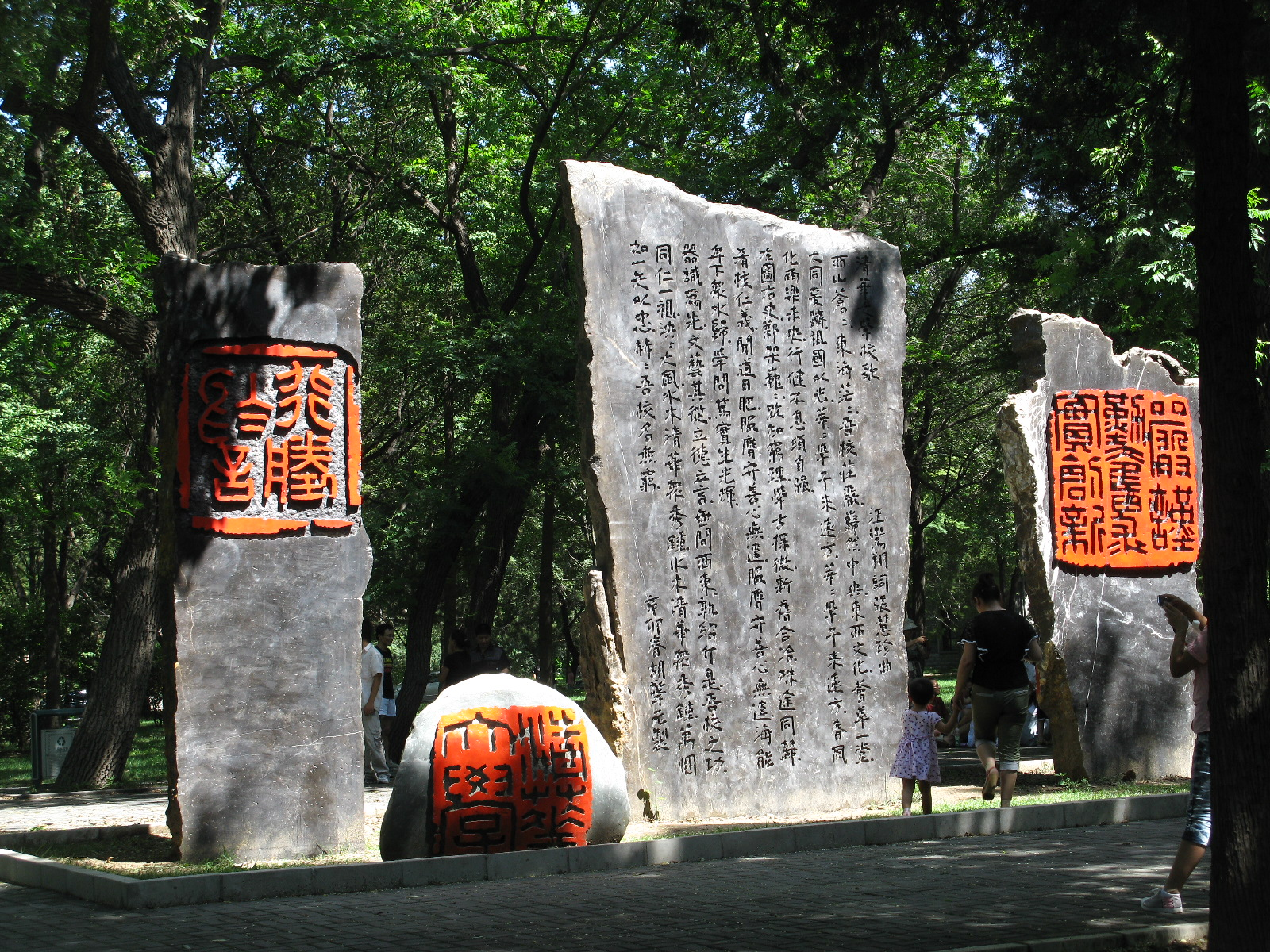
Sculptural artworks on the campus

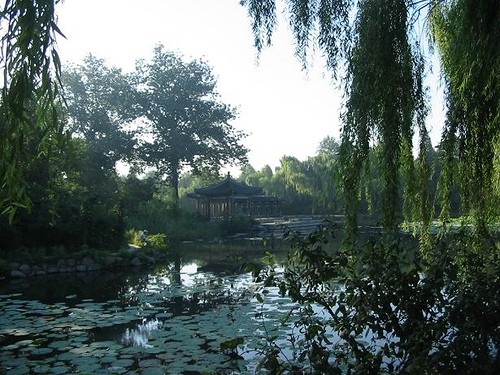
Tsinghua campus scenery

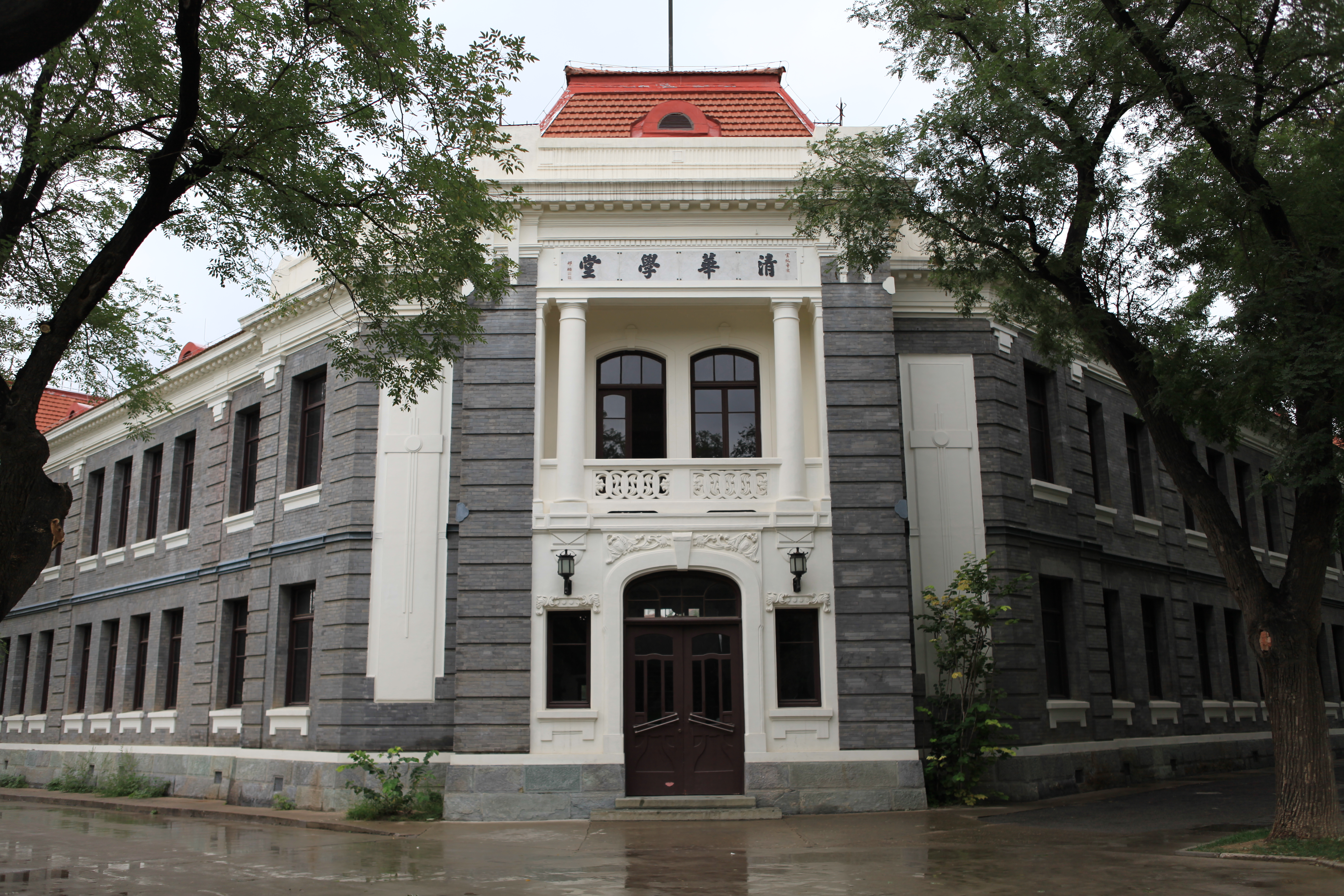
A teaching and protected heritage building (the former Tsinghua College)

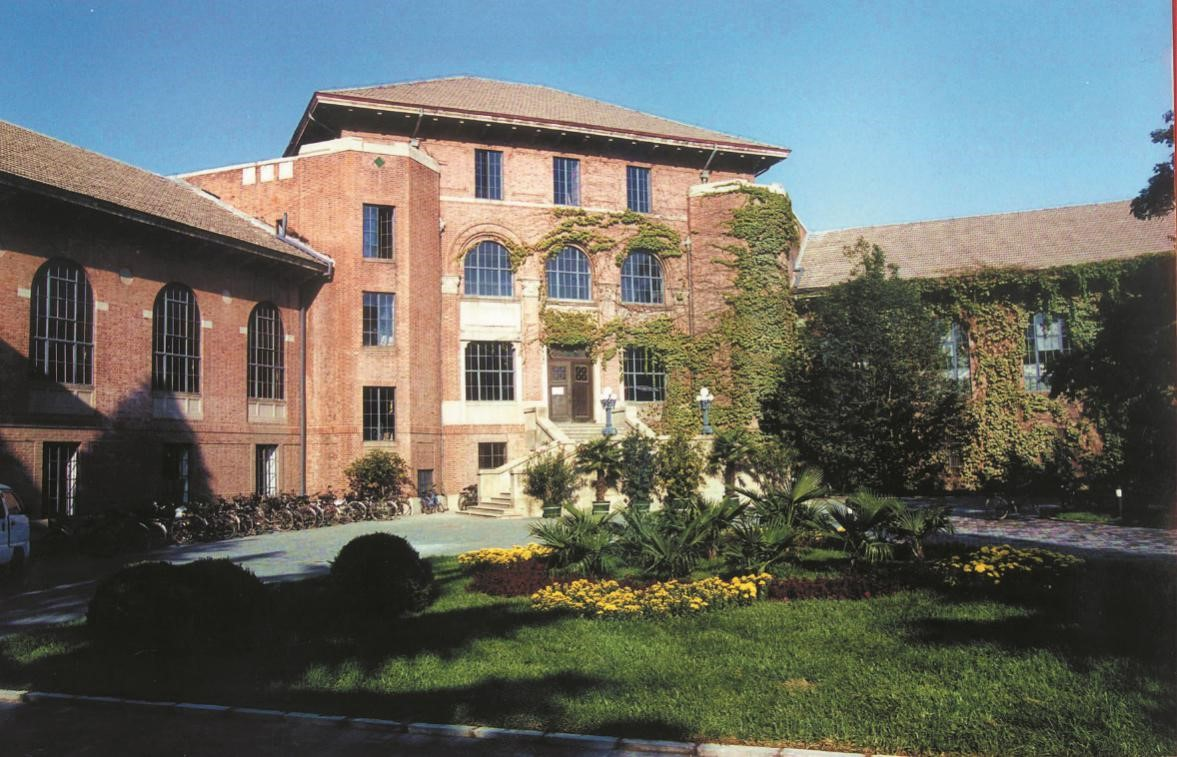
The Old Library building of the Tsinghua University Library

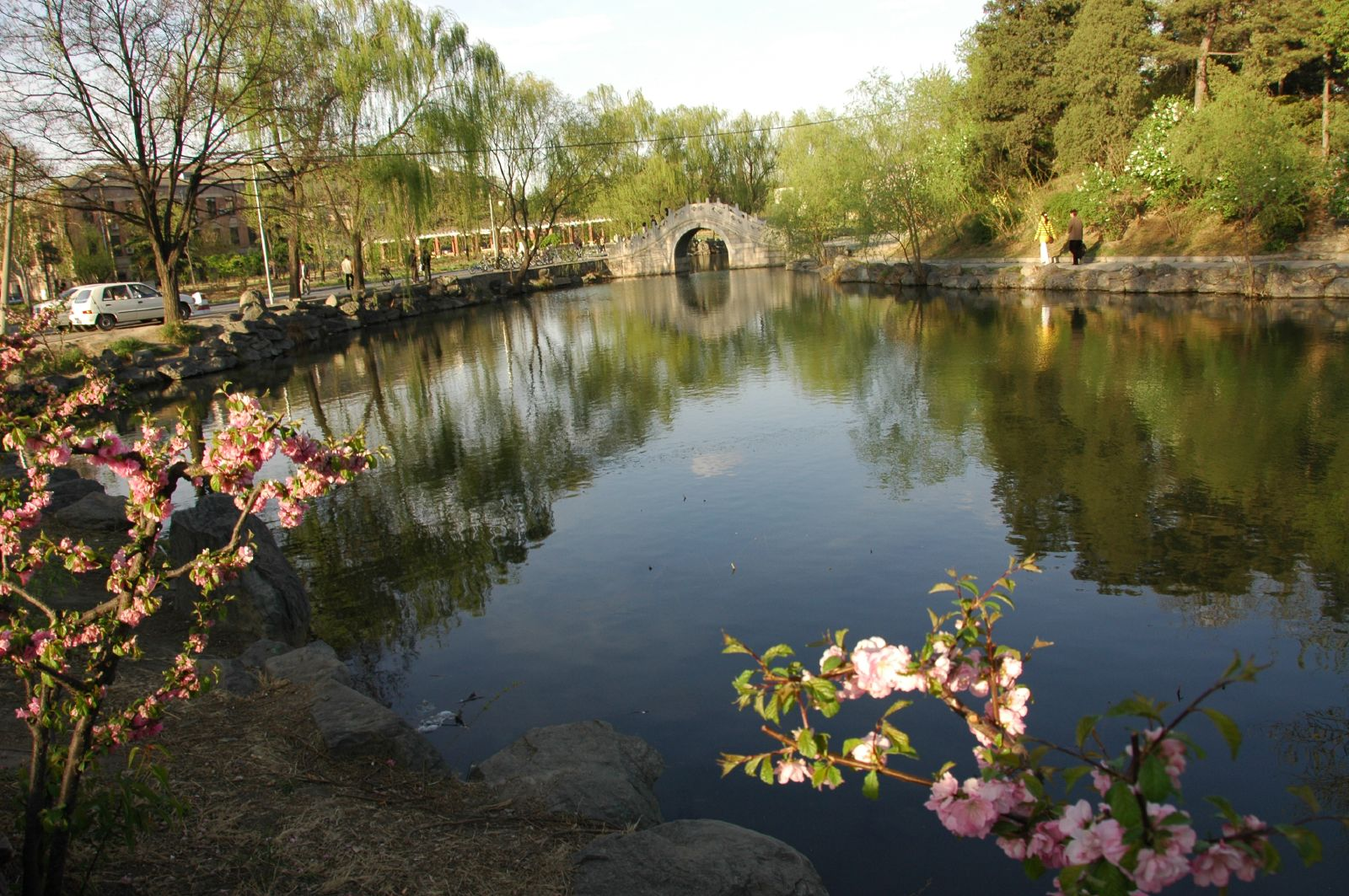
A Qing dynasty Jinchun Garden on the Tsinghua University campus

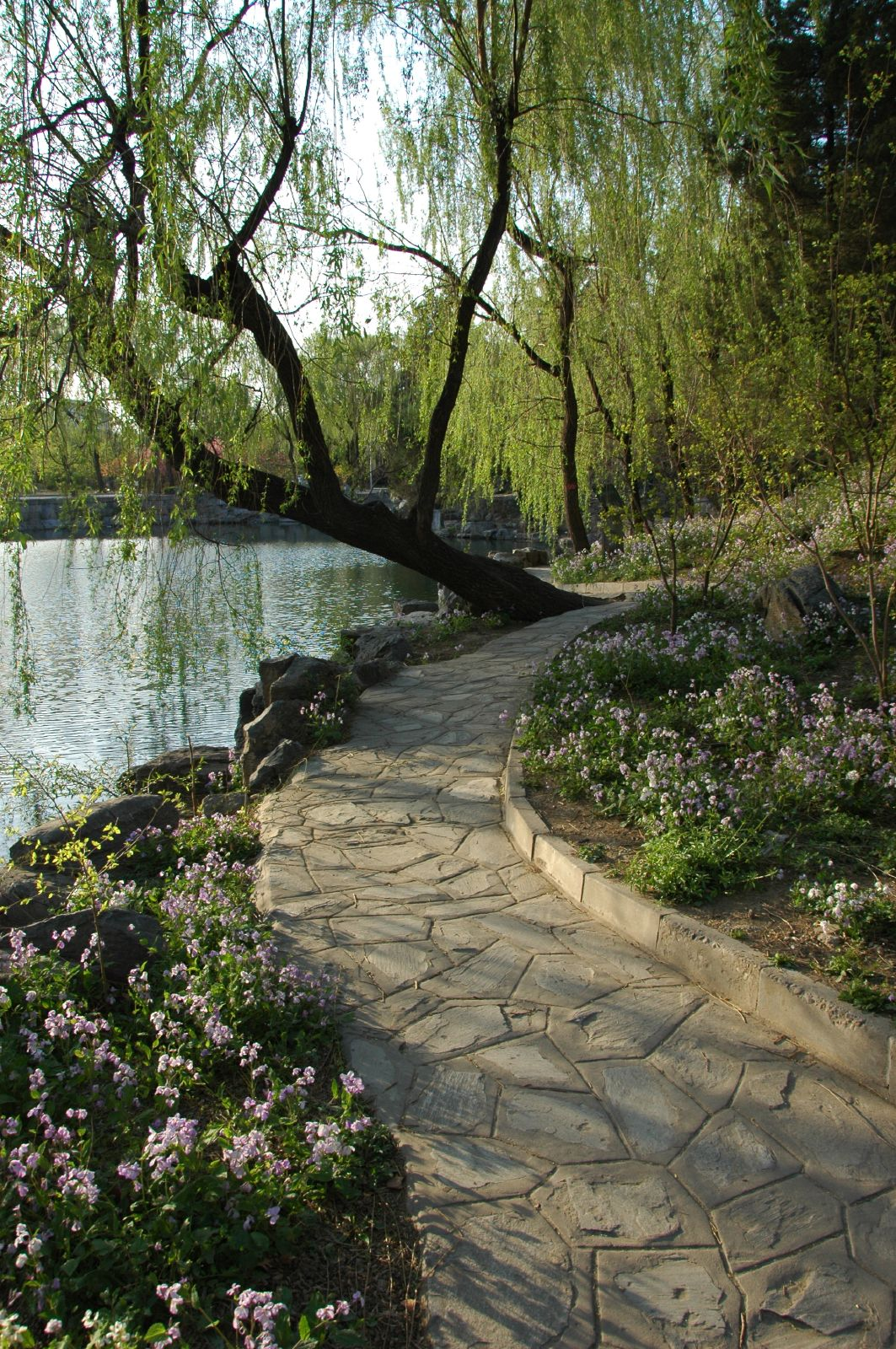
A pathway in the campus

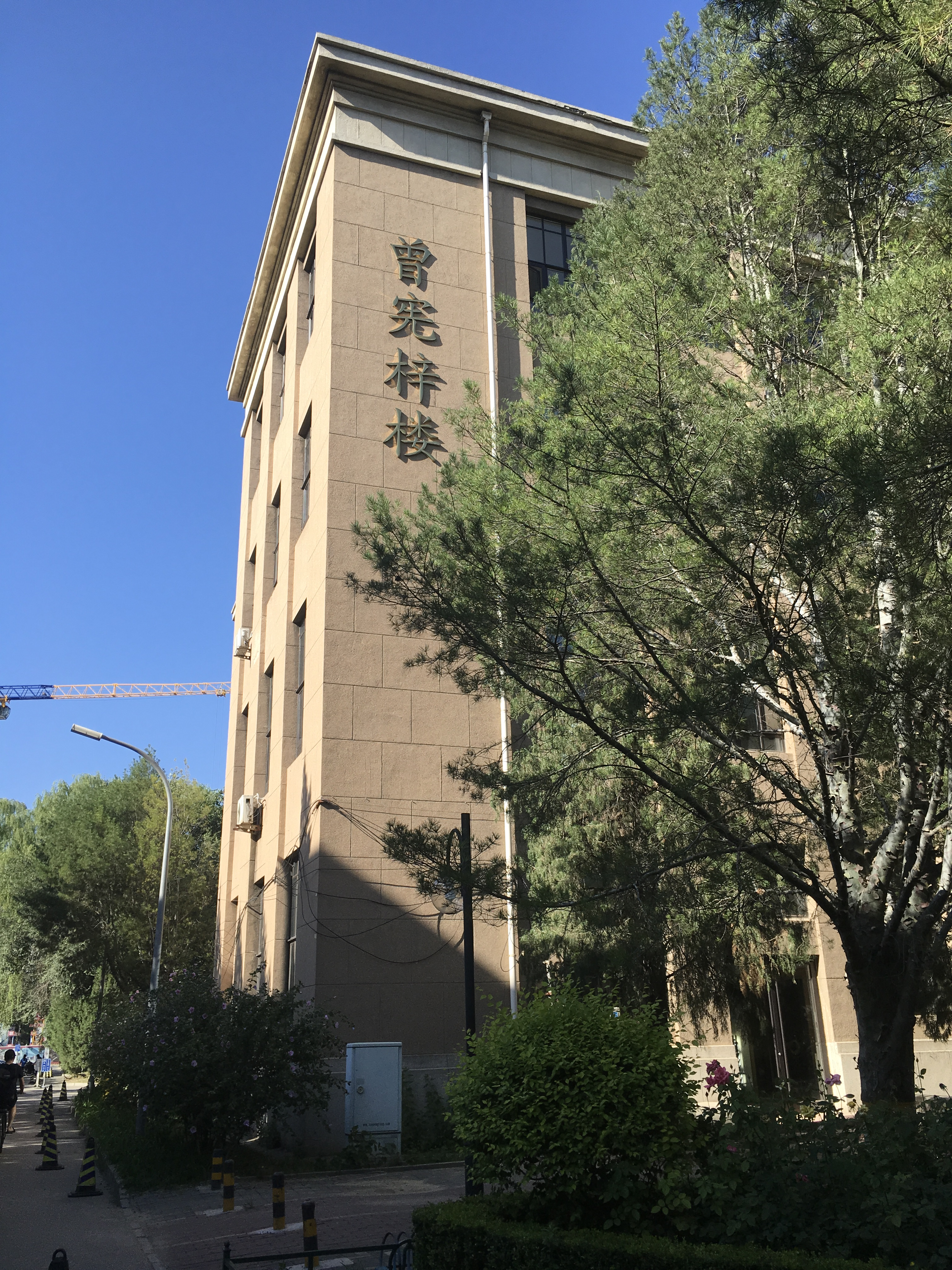
Zeng Xianzi Building

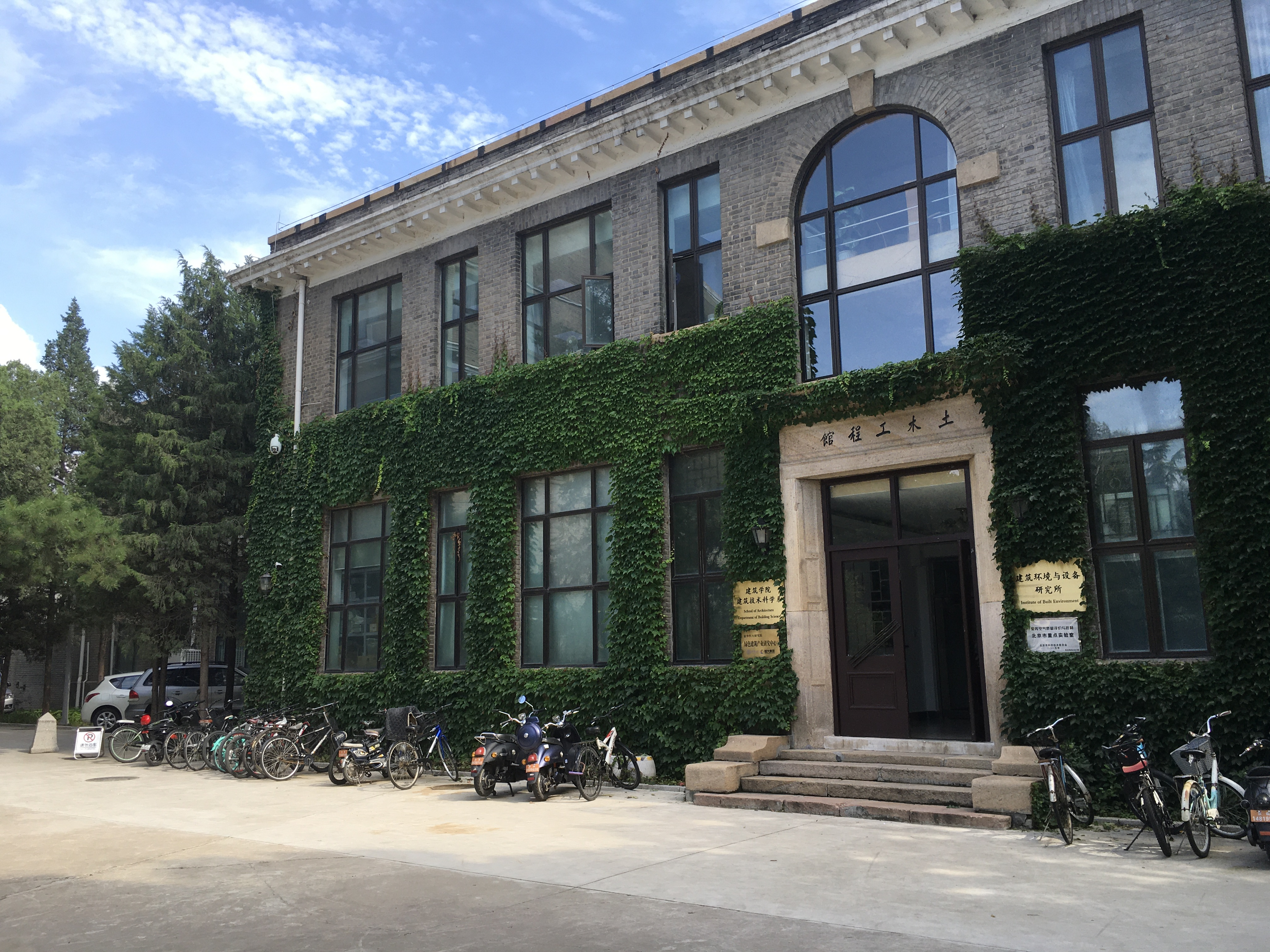
The Civil Engineering Hall

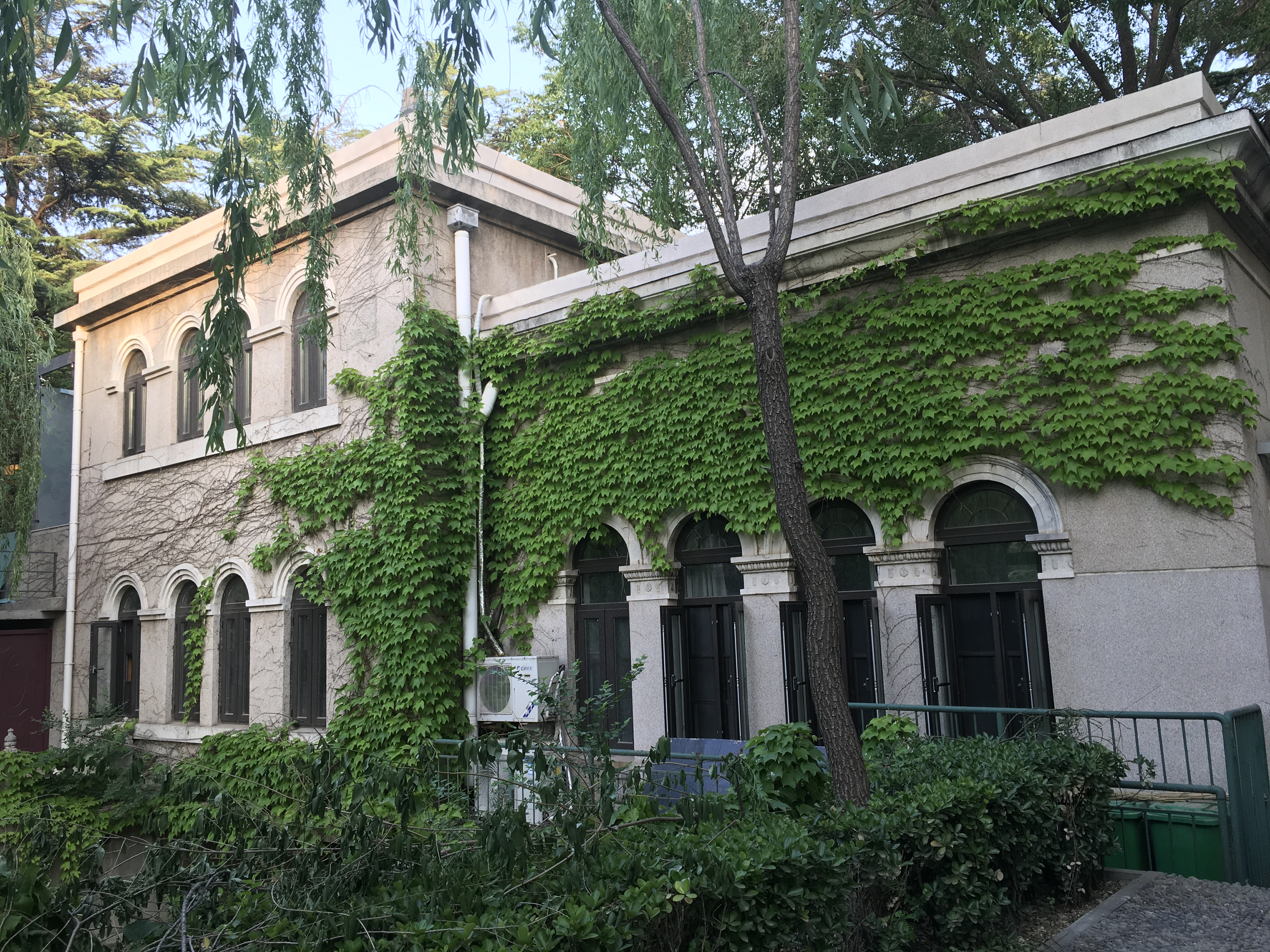
The Geological Hall

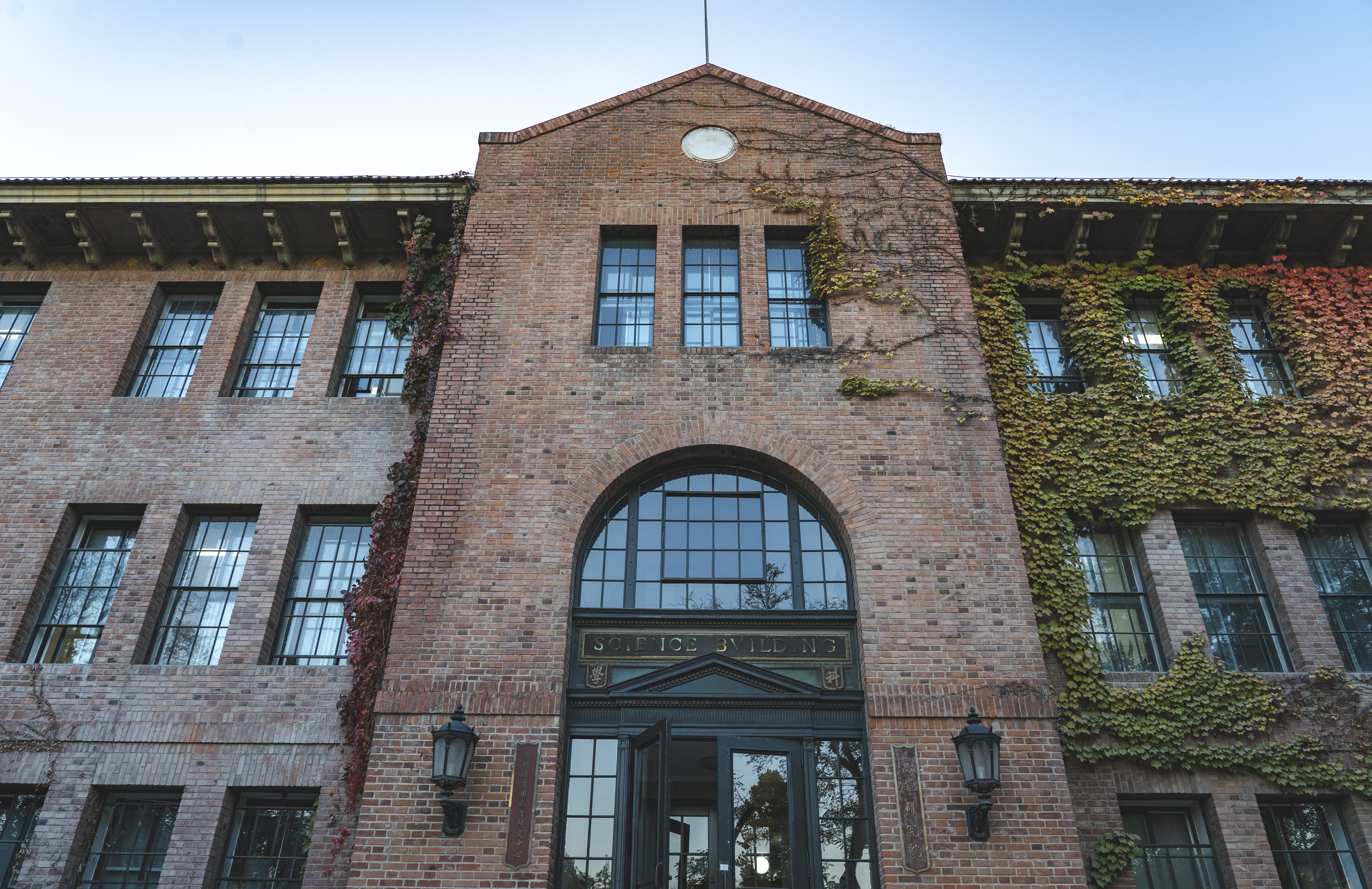
The Science Building

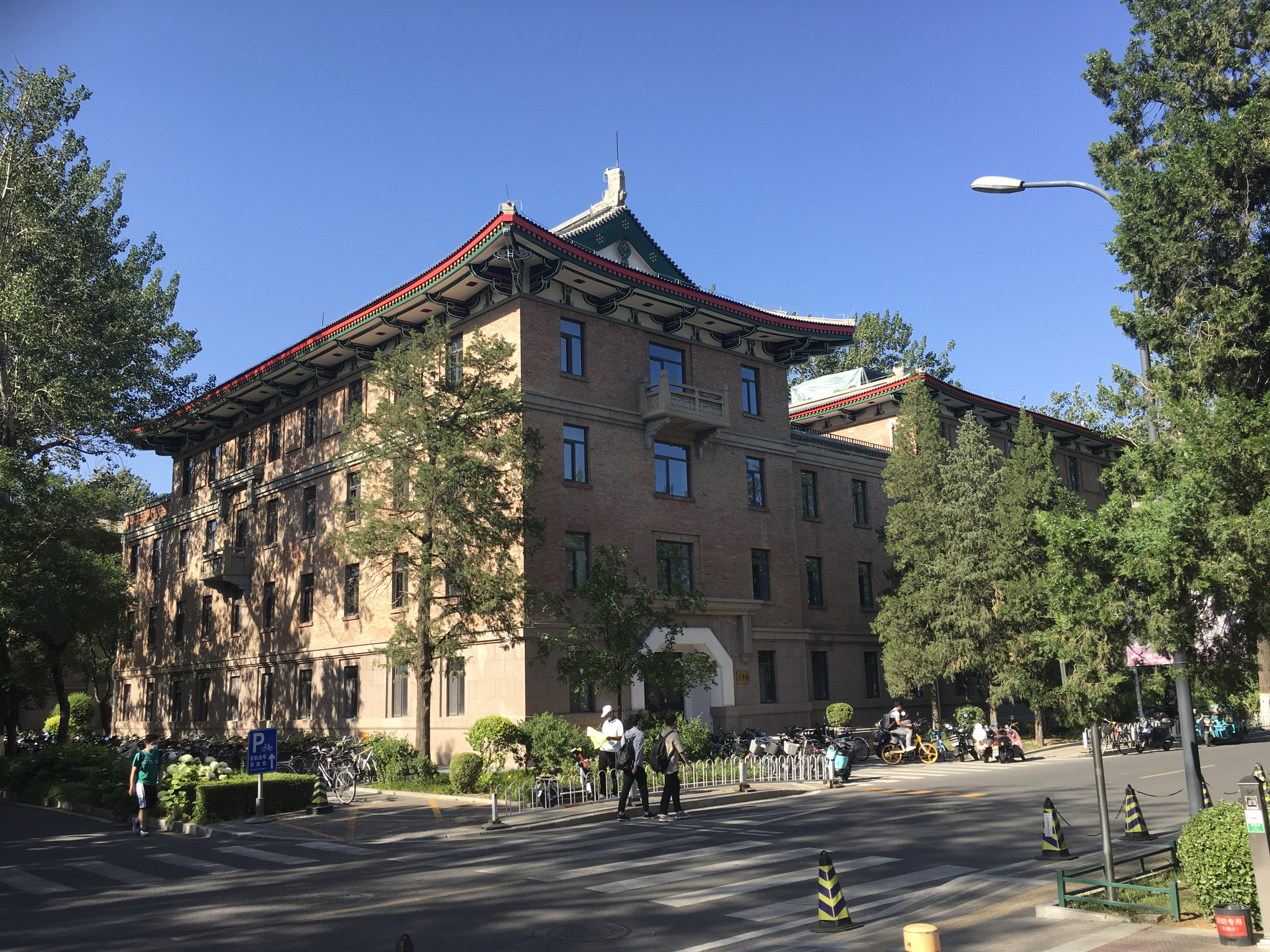
A building from the old student dormitory

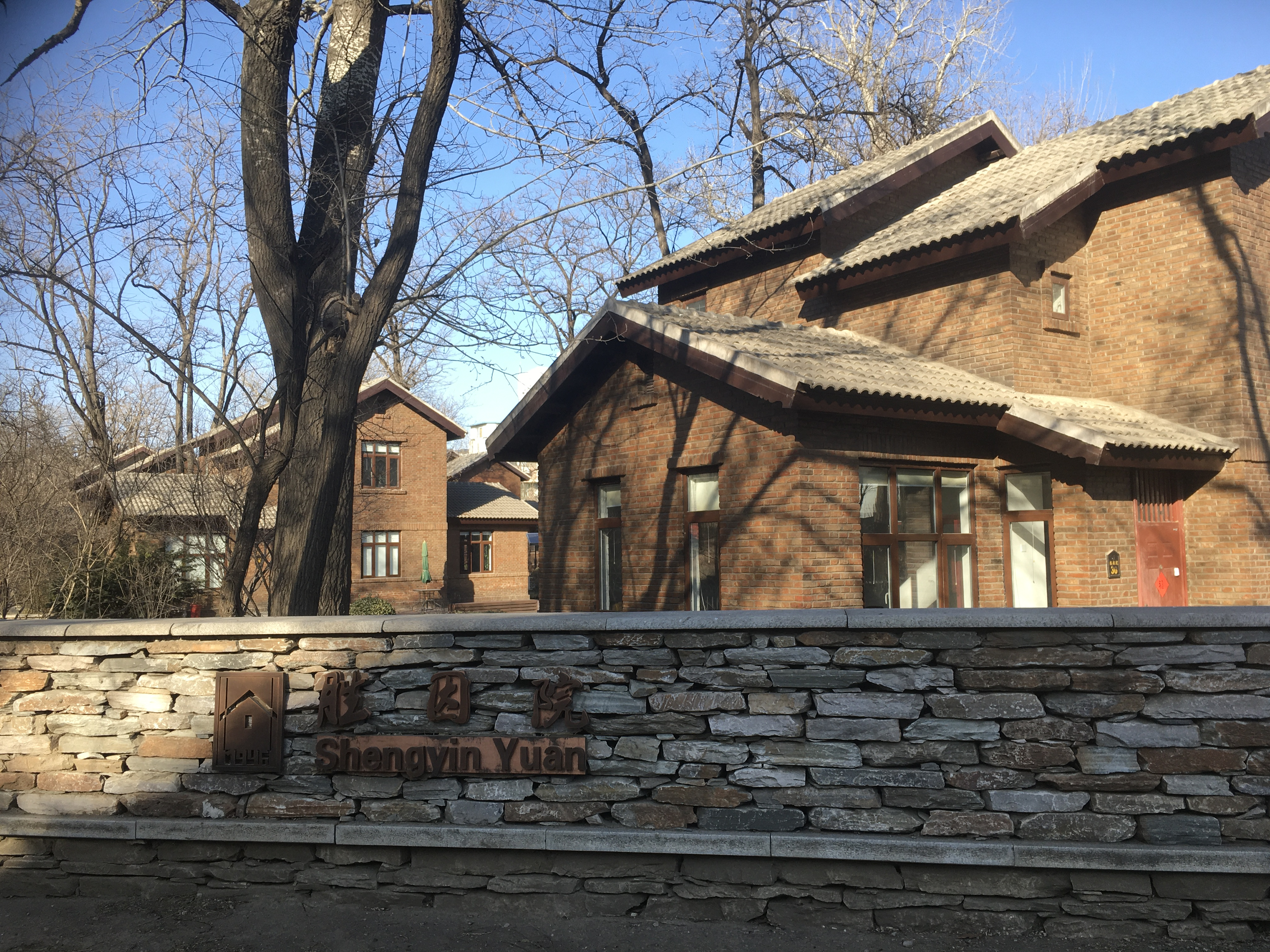
The Shengyinyuan, built in 1946, contains numerous residential houses for the faculty

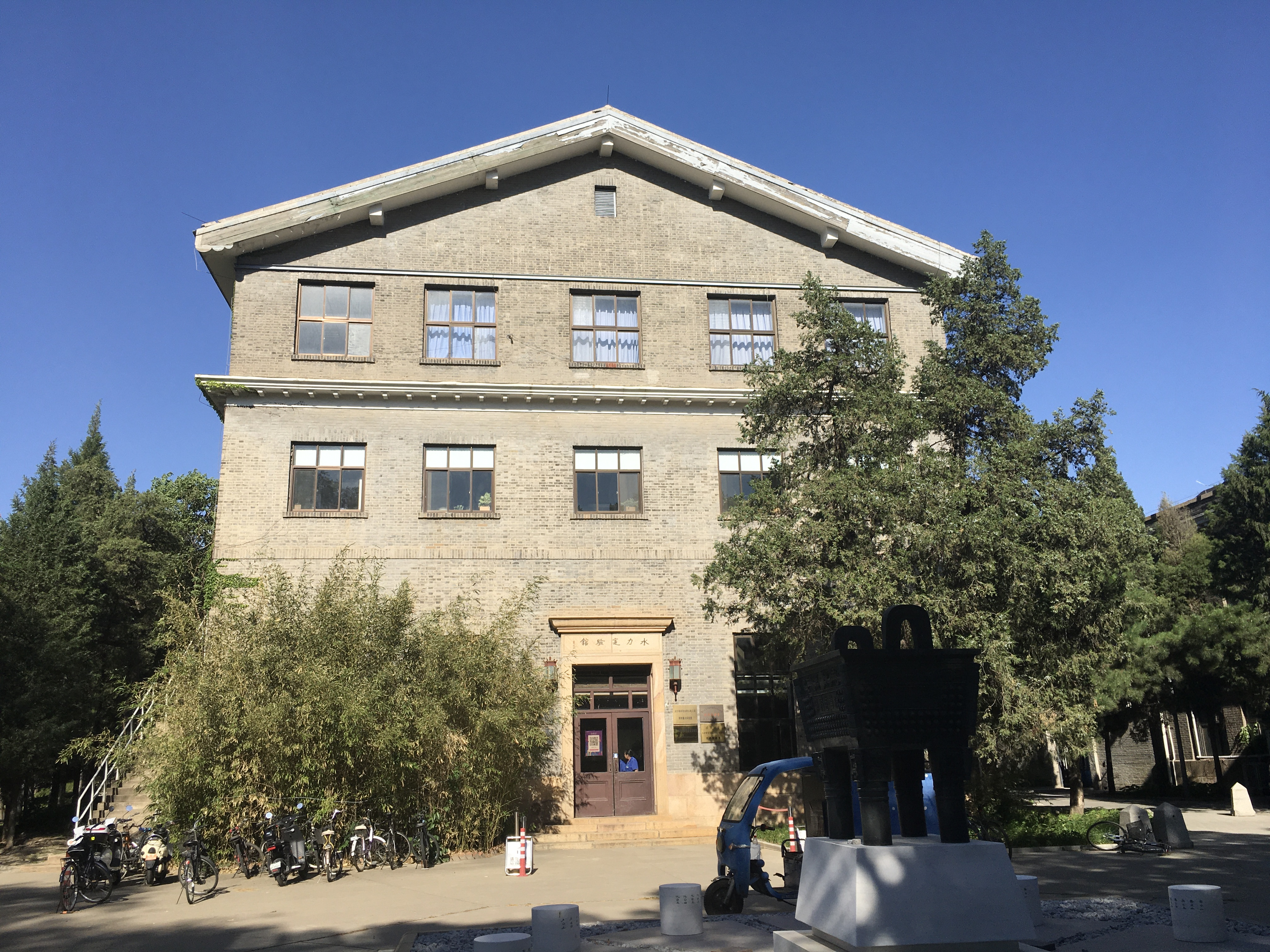
Hydraulic Experiment Hall

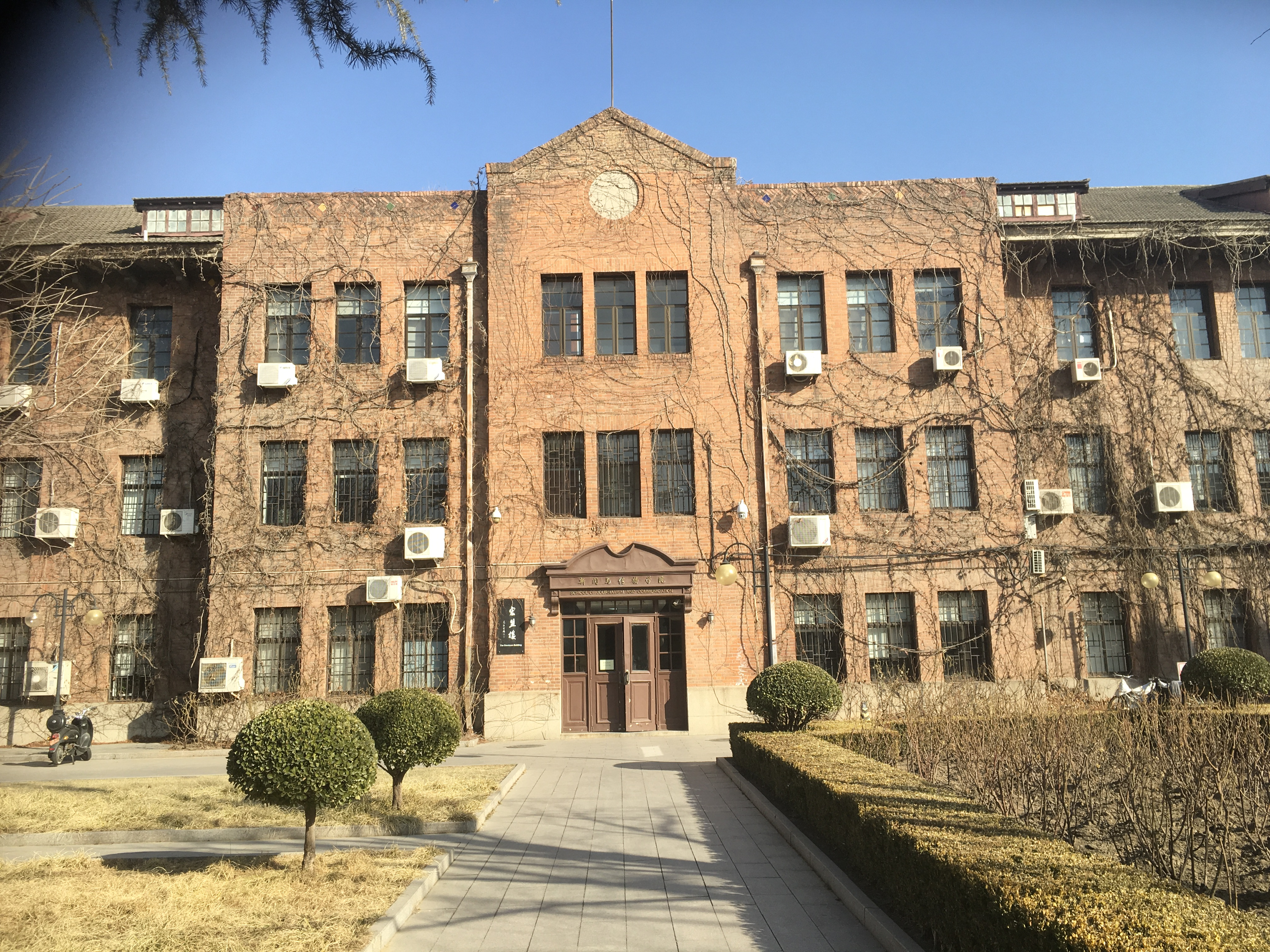
The Electrical Engineering Hall

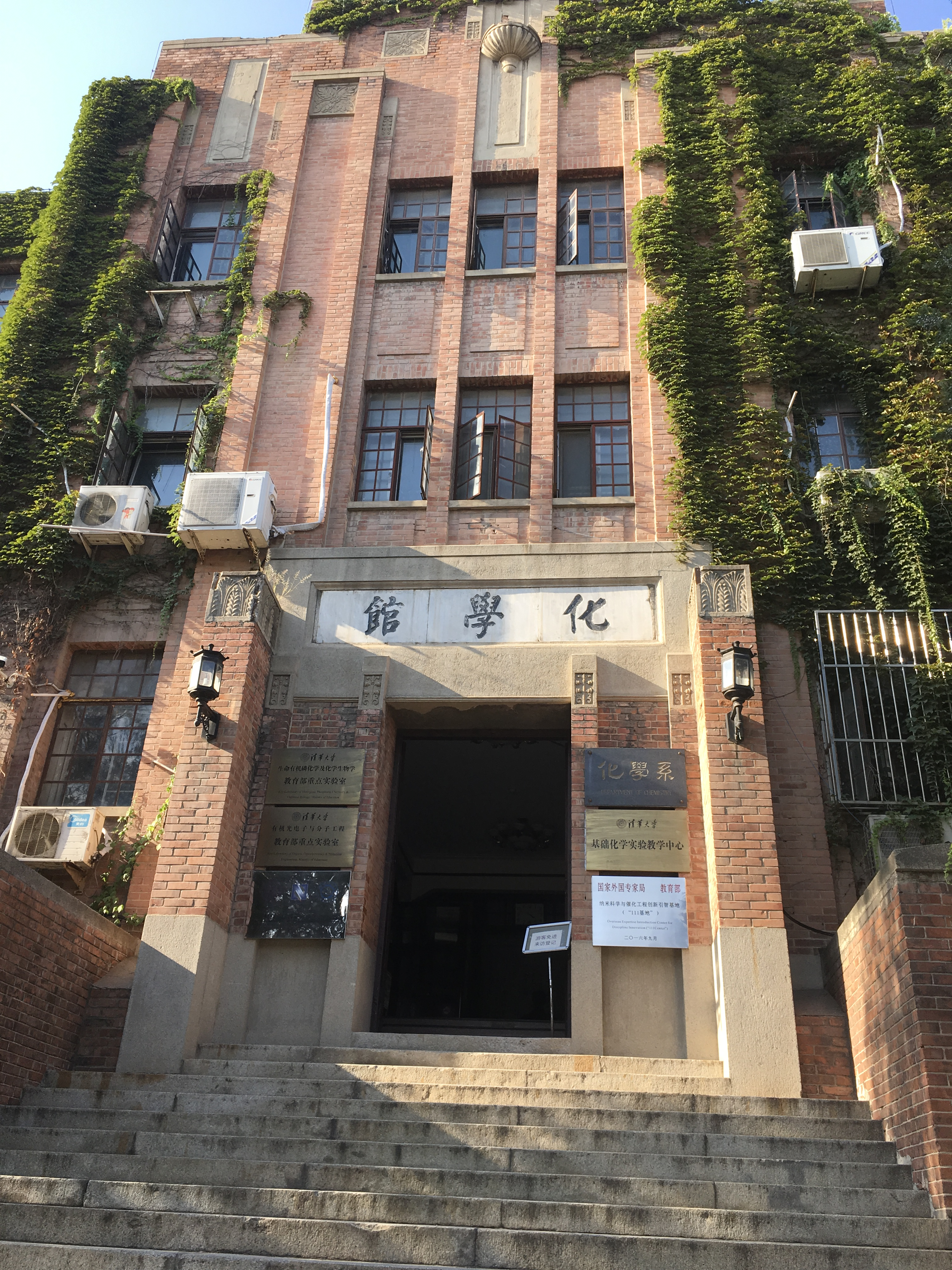
The Chemistry Hall

== Notable people ==
=== Notable alumni ===
Tsinghua University has produced many notable graduates, especially in political sphere, academic field and industry. Forbes has referred to Tsinghua as China's "power factory", citing the number of senior Chinese politicians the university has produced.

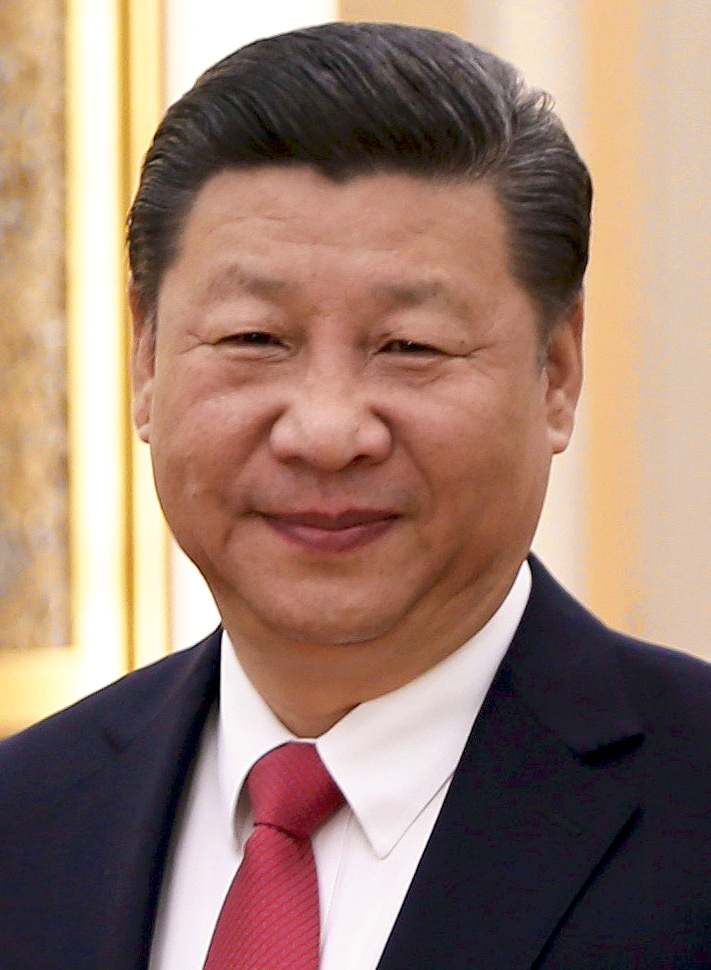
President of China Xi Jinping (Chemical Engineering 1979)

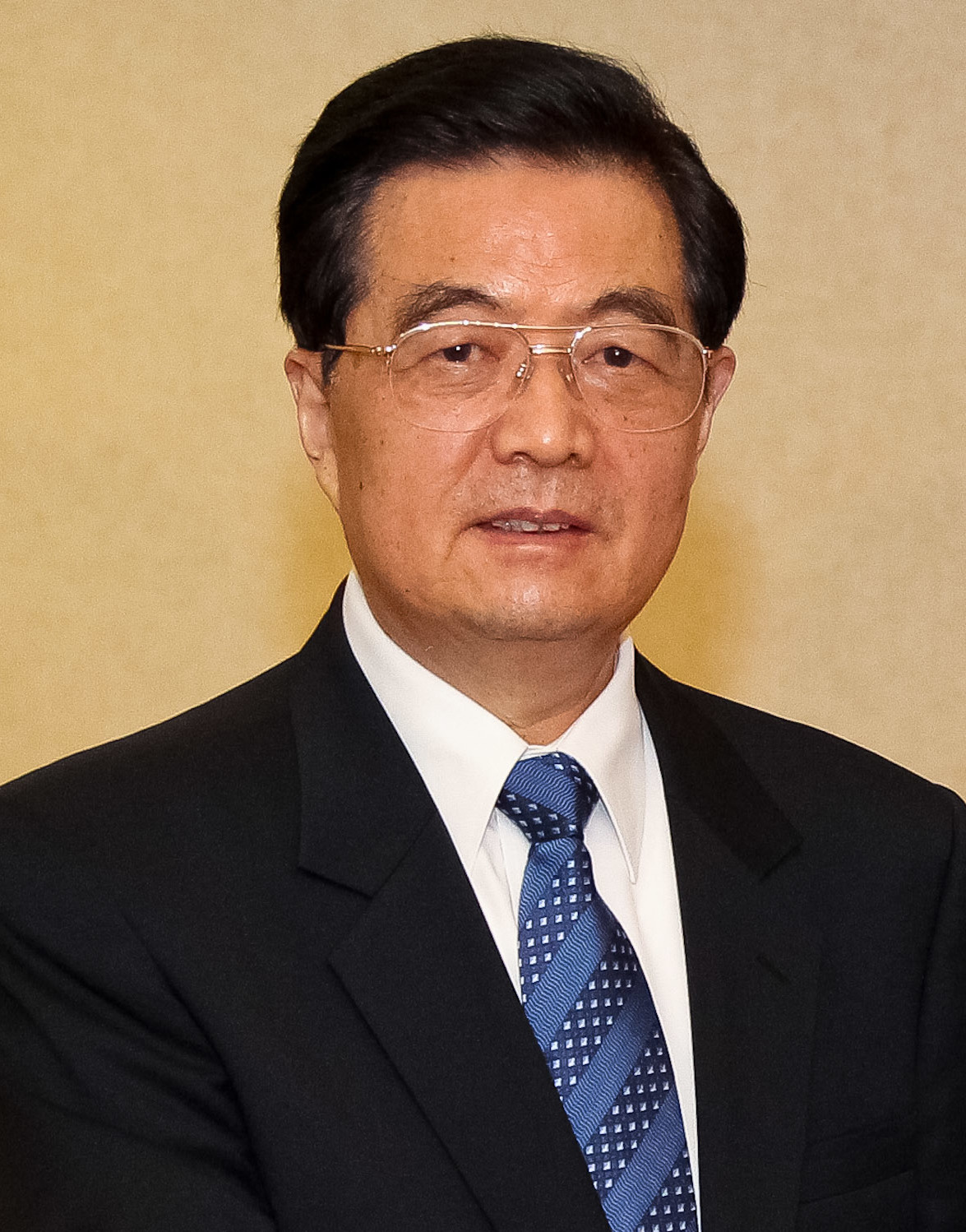
Former president of China Hu Jintao (Hydraulic Engineering 1964)

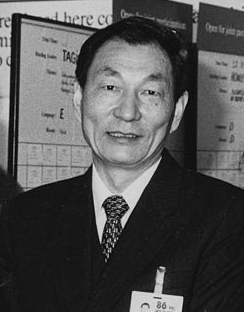
Former premier of China Zhu Rongji (Electrical Engineering 1951)

Notable alumni who have held senior positions in Chinese politics include current general secretary and president of China, Xi Jinping, former general secretary and president of China Hu Jintao, former chairman of the National People's Congress Wu Bangguo, former premier Zhu Rongji, and the former first vice premier Huang Ju. This also includes politicians like Wu Guanzheng, former governor of the People's Bank of China Zhou Xiaochuan, former minister of finance Lou Jiwei, general Sun Li-jen, Liang Qichao, and more. Since 2016, Tsinghua graduates who have political prominence are disproportionately greater in number than graduates of other famous universities.

Notable alumni in the sciences include Nobel laureate Yang Chen Ning, who was awarded the Nobel Prize in Physics for his work with Tsung-Dao Lee on parity nonconservation of weak interaction; Wolf Prize-winning mathematician Shiing-Shen Chern, biologist Min Chueh Chang, theoretical physicist Zhou Peiyuan, astronomer Zhang Yuzhe, biomedical engineer Leslie Ying, mechanical engineer Qingyan Chen, anthropologist Fei Xiaotong, sociologist and ethnologist Wu Wenzao, political scientist K. C. Hsiao, and sociologist Pan Guangdan.

Tsinghua is known for having educated the most billionaires of any university in China, and since 2017 counts 152 billionaires amongst its alumni. These include billionaires Sun Hongbin (real estate), chairman of Goertek Jiang Bin (components), Xu Hang (medical devices), and Zhang Zetian (e-commerce), among others.

Notable alumni in the arts and poetry include author Qian Zhongshu, Wen Yiduo, painter Xinyi Cheng, historian and poet Wang Guowei, Chen Yinke, and architect Xu Tiantian.

=== Tsinghua clique ===
The term Tsinghua clique refers to a group of Chinese Communist Party politicians that have graduated from Tsinghua University. They are members of the fourth generation of Chinese leadership, and are purported to hold reformist and hesitantly pro-democratic ideas (a number have studied in the United States following graduation from Tsinghua, and some are said to be influenced by the reform ideals of Hu Yaobang). In the PRC, their ascendance to power began in 2008 at the 17th National Congress of the Chinese Communist Party.

== Canteens ==
Student canteens

- The Zijingyuan Canteen is located at the northeast corner of Tsinghua University, within the Zijing Student Apartments zone. The canteen has five floors (including one basement level), with a building area of 11,671 m², and can accommodate over 3,500 people dining at the same time.
- The Taoliyuan Canteen covers an area of 9,696 m², has four floors (including one basement level), and began formal food service on August 6, 2004.
- The Qingfenyuan Canteen began construction in March 1957, originally named the “Seventh Canteen”. The name “Qingfen” derives from the stone inscription “清芬挺秀、华夏增辉”. The canteen was renamed to “Qingfenyuan” in December 2006, with the intention of inspiring future generations to strive ceaselessly. The new Qingfenyuan was built on the site of the old Qingfenyuan and Qing Qing fast-food area, and officially opened for dining at the end of November 2015. It is located southeast of the intersection of Xuetang Road and Zhishan Road, a route that students pass regularly between classes. Qingfenyuan has four floors, a usable area of approximately 8,600 m², and can accommodate over 1,900 people dining simultaneously.
- The Tīngtaoyuan Canteen was completed in July 1981, originally called the “Tenth Canteen”. It is located at the junction of Xuetang Road and Zhishan Road, covers more than 2,000 m², and can accommodate over 1,000 people dining at one time. It sits east of the Wan quan River; to its west are a hundred willow trees, and to the southwest a gently winding lawn and clusters of bamboo. When a breeze stirs, teachers and students dining here can sit and watch the rippling water and listen to the rustling pines — hence in 2006 it was renamed “Tīngtaoyuan”. Tīngtaoyuan has two levels.
- The Rongyuan Canteen was established on January 8, 2013, located within the School of Finance at Wudaokou of Tsinghua University, with a building area of 1,286 m², and is the only canteen within the School of Finance. Rongyuan has two floors.
- The Dingxiangyuan Canteen, originally known as the “Fourteenth Canteen”, was completed in January 1987, has a usable area of 1,300 m², and can accommodate over 580 people dining at the same time. Its name derives from “white lilac” (one of Tsinghua's campus flowers), symbolizing that though its area is modest, its food is as pure, elegant and fragrant as lilac flowers.
- The Wenxinyuan Canteen is located at the southwest corner of the Guanchouyuan Canteen, and started use in 2001. It provides halal cuisine; the environment is elegant and clean, and it can accommodate over 100 people dining at the same time.
- The Shuangqingyuan Canteen began trial operations on August 16, 2021, located around the off-campus Shuangqing Apartments, facilitating daily meals for nearby students and faculty.

Staff Canteens

- Tsinghua University's Guanchouyuan Canteen (originally known as “Tsinghua University Dining Plaza”) is located on the north side of the West-Grand Sports Field, with a building area of 13,250 m², spread over three floors, and can seat approximately 3,000 diners simultaneously. It is a comprehensive large canteen integrating full-service Chinese meals, Western cuisine, and flavour-specialty snacks. According to research, in 1707 the Emperor Kangxi's third son built the Xichun Garden (now the Gong-zi-Ting), within which there were 150 mu of fertile fields; the Qianlong Emperor built the Guanchou Building by the fields and repeatedly composed poems praising agricultural labour. Today Guanchouyuan stands beside the former imperial farmlands of over two centuries ago, its name meant to remind Tsinghua's faculty and students not to forget the hardships of tilling and the labours of the farmers.
- The Teachers’ Restaurant is located on the third floor of Qingfenyuan Canteen; it officially opened on March 21, 2016, and can accommodate around 400 diners at the same time. The restaurant is tastefully decorated and pleasantly appointed, with attentive service, designed to provide the faculty a comfortable and delightful space for academic exchange.
- The Zhilanyuan Dining Hall is located northeast of the Zijing Apartments, with a building area of 2,500 m², provides halal meals, has two floors, and can serve approximately 800 diners simultaneously.

Specialty Dining Halls

- Qingqing Fast Food: Located on the basement level of the Qingfenyuan Dining Hall, with an approximate usage area of 340 m². It can accommodate about 400 people dining simultaneously. The fast-food hall adheres to the concept of convenience, speed, nutrition and hygiene, aligning with the fast-paced modern lifestyle, and aims to quickly provide delicious Western-style fast meals for faculty, staff and students.
- Qingqing Leisure Dining: Located in the basement level of the Taoliyuan Dining Hall, this “Qingqing series” casual dining hall is designed to give students a place to chat, relax, or read.
- Qingqing Yonghe: Located on the north side of the first floor of the Guanchouyuan Dining Hall, it can accommodate 112 people simultaneously.

== See also ==
- Tsinghua Shenzhen International Graduate School
- Tsinghua-Berkeley Shenzhen Institute
- Anti-Corruption and Governance Research Center
- Institute of Nuclear and New Energy Technology
- Peking Union Medical College
- National Tsing Hua University
- SMTH BBS
- Tsinghua clique
- Tsinghua Holdings
- Tsinghua University Press
- Education in the People's Republic of China
- Tsinghua University High School
- List of colleges and universities in Beijing
- Wudaokou
