= Tsinghua–Berkeley Shenzhen Institute =

Institute in Shenzhen, Guangdong, China

- 清华-伯克利深圳学院
- Type: Public
- Established: 2014; 12 years ago
- President: Gao Hong; Liwei Lin
- Location: Shenzhen, China
- Flower: Redbud and Lilac
- Colors: Purple; White
- Website: www.tbsi.edu.cn

Chinese name
- Simplified Chinese: 清华-伯克利深圳学院
- Traditional Chinese: 清華-伯克利深圳學院
Transcriptions
Standard Mandarin
- Hanyu Pinyin: Qīnghuá-Bókèlì Shēnzhèn Xuéyuàn

The Tsinghua–Berkeley Shenzhen Institute (TBSI; 清华–伯克利深圳学院) is an institute which was established in Shenzhen, Guangdong, China in 2014 according to an agreement signed by Tsinghua University, the University of California, Berkeley, and the Shenzhen Municipal People's Government. In 2018, the city of Shenzhen agreed to spend $220 million on the institute.

The institute aims to develop a research program that supports multidisciplinary collaboration on societal and economic challenges in China, the United States and globally.

== Controversy ==
In July 2023, the United States House Select Committee on Strategic Competition between the United States and the Chinese Communist Party initiated an investigation into TBSI and its research into dual-use technology.

In April 2025, an additional investigation was launched regarding the enforcement of Section 117, a federal law requiring colleges to disclose foreign gifts and contracts valued at $250,000 or more. They asserted that UC Berkeley failed to report $220 million in funding from the Chinese government to build TBSI. They also posited that American researchers at TBSI contributed to China's technological advancement and military modernization. UC Berkeley denied these claims, but also ended their affiliation with TBSI.

== See also ==
- List of universities and colleges in Guangdong
- Tsinghua Shenzhen International Graduate School
- Tsinghua University
- University of California, Berkeley
