= Pan Guangdan =

Chinese sociologist, eugenist, and writer (1898–1967)

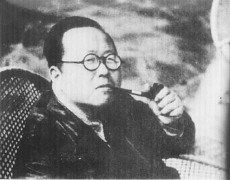
Pan Guangdan

Pan Guangdan (Chinese: 潘光旦; 1898–1967) known in English as Quentin Pan, was a Chinese sociologist, eugenist, and writer. He was one of the most distinguished sociologists and eugenists of China. Educated at Tsinghua University on a Boxer Indemnity Scholarship, Dartmouth College and Columbia University, where he was trained by Charles B. Davenport, Pan was also a renowned expert on education. His wide research scope included eugenics, education policy, matrimony policy, familial problems, prostitute policy, and intellectual distributions. Pan's wide-ranging intellect led to his active participation in the Crescent Moon Society.

Pan's most famous student was Fei Xiaotong, the "father of Chinese anthropology."

== Career ==
Pan joined the China Democratic Groups League (later China Democratic League) in 1941, and was a standing committee member of the central committee of the League. During the Anti-Rightist Movement, he was determined to be a "rightist." Pan was persecuted in Cultural Revolution, and died in 1967, at 69. He was rehabilitated in 1979.

== Eugenics ==
For Pan, eugenics was both a political and scientific matter, as well as economic, ethnological and sociological; and he is credited with the popularization of eugenic thought in the 1920s and '30s in China. Some of his most influential works include The Eugenic Question in China (中国之优生问题) and Chinese Family Problems (中国之家庭问题) (1928). In these works, Pan promoted the family structure over individualism, which he believed, along with traditional marriage, to be most effective in racial improvement through biological inheritance. Urban living, he said, only promoted decadent individualism and contributed nothing to the racial fitness of the nation. Although he supported the use of state power for the implementation of eugenic policies, primarily through his founding of The Chinese Eugenics Institute, conflicts such as the Sino-Japanese War, World War II, and the civil war between the KMT and the Communists prevented governmental adoption of his ideas.

In a 1937 volume of essays, "Minzu texing yu minzu weisheng" (民族 特性 与 民族 卫生 Racial characteristics and racial hygiene) Pan argued that government programs of health and reconstruction were of no use if the majority of the people were of low quality. He included his translations from the works of Ellsworth Huntington and the American missionary Arthur H. Smith's 1894 book Chinese Characteristics. Smith's chapters "Absence of Nerves", "Disregard of Accuracy", and "Absence of Public Spirit", he said, illustrated the selfish, unscientific, face-loving, "Chinese Everyman" who weakened the Chinese race. He called for educated and intelligent Chinese to increase their rate of birth and improve Chinese people's health by increasing the number of people who were genetically superior.

Pan argued that the anthropological category of "race" was not yet scientifically substantiated. Eugenics as a newly established discipline should not, he believed, become entangled with dubious claims about superior races, since every "color" of people shared both the good and the bad germplasm distributed in its own population.

During the Second Sino-Japanese War, Pan was among the prominent Chinese eugenists who viewed the war as a contest of population that would allow only the strongest to survive. Consistent with this reasoning, Nationalist China enacted more stringent abortion laws during the war.
