= Tsinghua Shenzhen International Graduate School =

Graduate school in Shenzhen, Guangdong, China

Coordinates: 22°35′55″N 113°58′32″E

- 清华大学深圳国际研究生院
- Former name: Graduate School at Shenzhen (GSST)
- Motto: 自强不息、厚德载物
- Motto in English: Self-Discipline and Social Commitment
- Type: Public
- Established: 2019; 7 years ago
- Dean: Ouyang Zheng
- Location: Shenzhen, China
- Colors: Blue; Orange
- Website: sigs.tsinghua.edu.cn

Chinese name
- Simplified Chinese: 清华大学深圳国际研究生院
- Traditional Chinese: 清華大學深圳國際研究生院
Transcriptions
Standard Mandarin
- Hanyu Pinyin: Qīnghuá Dàxué Shēnzhèn Guójì Yánjiūshēng Yuàn

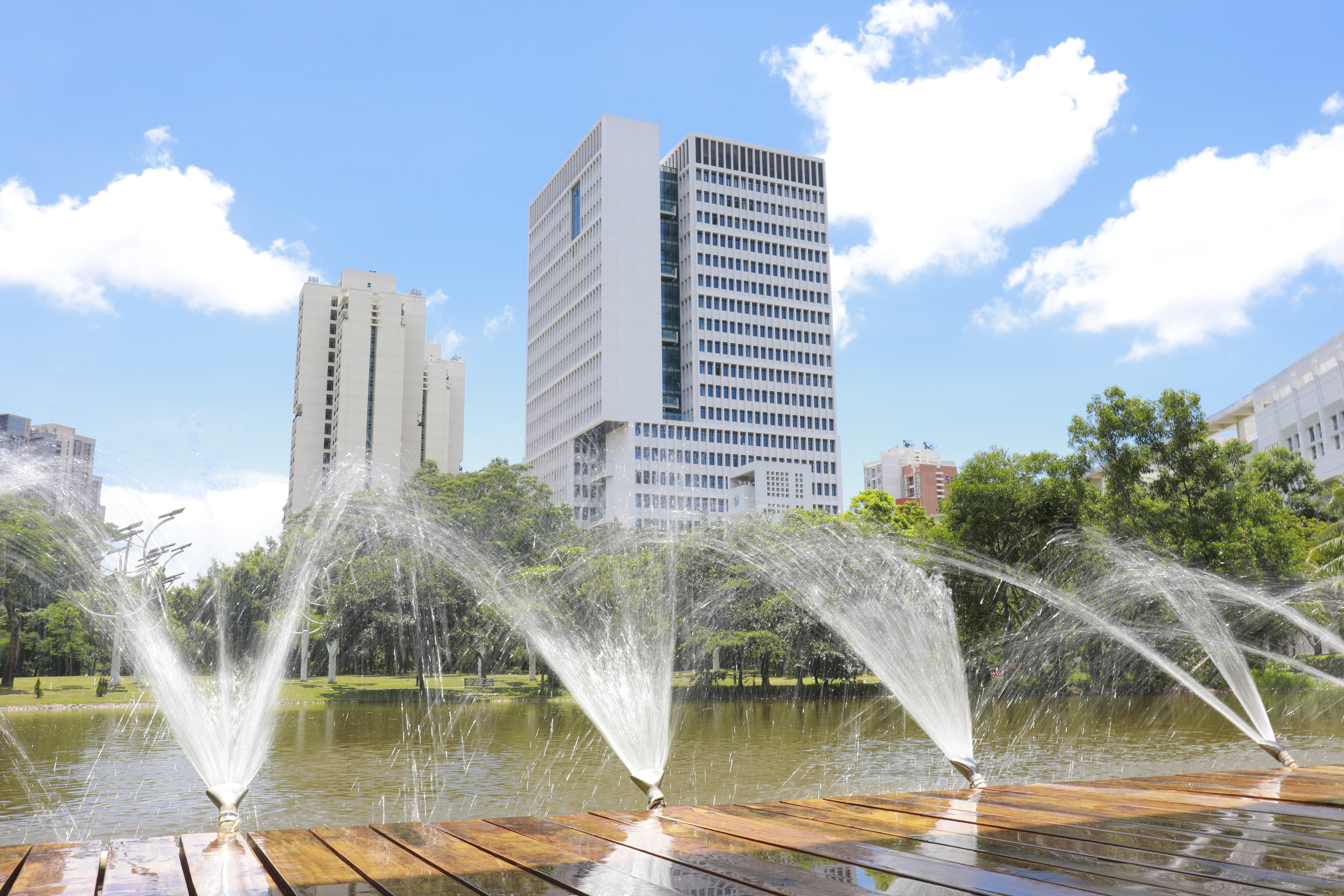
Information Building at Tsinghua SIGS

Tsinghua Shenzhen International Graduate School (Tsinghua SIGS; 清华大学深圳国际研究生院) is a joint-venture graduate school established by Tsinghua University and the Shenzhen Municipal People's Government in 2001. The school is located in University Town, Nanshan, Shenzhen, Guangdong, China.

By 2025, Tsinghua SIGS has expanded its current size of full-time graduate students to over 5,000 students.

== History ==
Tsinghua SIGS traces its origins to the establishment of the Graduate School at Shenzhen, Tsinghua University (GSST) in 2001. Founded as part of Tsinghua University's broader strategy to enhance its global profile and promote innovation in higher education, GSST implemented a comprehensive and internationalized model for graduate studies. It was designed to support technological, economic, and social development in Shenzhen and the wider Guangdong-Hong Kong-Macau Greater Bay Area.

The institution actively pursued international collaboration, establishing partnerships with overseas research and academic organizations. A significant milestone was reached in 2014 with the launch of the Tsinghua-Berkeley Shenzhen Institute (TBSI), a joint initiative with the University of California, Berkeley. This was followed in 2015 by the creation of the Open Faculty for Innovation, Education, Science, Technology & Art (Open FIESTA) in cooperation with the Center for Research and Interdisciplinarity in Paris.

In March 2019, GSST was restructured and expanded to form the Tsinghua Shenzhen International Graduate School (Tsinghua SIGS), integrating the functions and programs of its predecessors, including TBSI. Tsinghua SIGS continues its mission to deliver advanced graduate education, foster cutting-edge interdisciplinary research, and facilitate collaboration with industry partners within Shenzhen and the Greater Bay Area.

== International partnerships ==
In December 2017, the Shenzhen Geim Graphene Research Center, jointly established by Tsinghua University and the Shenzhen Municipal Government, officially opened.

In November 2019, the RISC-V International Open Source Laboratory (RIOS Lab) was officially unveiled. Under the leadership of 2017 A.M. Turing Award winner Dr. David Patterson, and operational support from TBSI, RIOS Lab mainly conducts research in RISC-V hardware and software technology.

The University of California, Berkeley is in the process of withdrawing from and divesting its stake in the Tsinghua Berkeley Shenzhen Institute (TBSI) nonprofit entity in Shenzhen.

== See also ==
- Tsinghua University
