= Sociology in China =

In the People's Republic of China, the study of sociology has been developing steadily since its reestablishment in 1979 (it had been previously banned by communist authorities as a bourgeois pseudoscience). Chinese sociology has a strong focus on applied sociology, and has become an important source of information for Chinese policymakers.

== History ==
Since 1840, China's traditional self-sufficient feudal economy has been impacted by the modern economy represented by the West. The Westernization Movement and the subsequent development of national capitalism have made China's economy gradually modernized. The Kui Ge Group was born in the background of this era. Yunnan University established the Department of Sociology in 1938, and in 1939 it jointly established the Sociology Laboratory with Yenching University. Carry out sociological surveys. Because Kunming was bombed by Japanese planes in 1940, the sociology research office had to be evacuated to the countryside in Chenggong County near Kunming. They rented the local three-story Kuixing Ge 大古城魁阁as a work base, so this research room has since been called "Kui Ge". According to the research content, the main representative works of the Kui Ge period can be summarized as follows: Agriculture, "Lu Village Farmland", "Study on the Small Farmer Economy in Er Village"; other traditional industries, "Yi Village Handicraft Industry"; Commerce, "Yucun Land and "Business", "Kunchang Workers", "Gejiu Miners", "Inland Women Workers"; Minority Society, "The Pendulum in the Border Area of Mangshi"; Traditional Society, "Under the Shadow of the Ancestor: Chinese Culture and Personality"; Political Society, "Huacheng City Grassroots Administration" "Chenggong Grassroots Power Structure".

Chinese sociologists believe that the development of Chinese sociology to the present is the result of historical accumulation. From Xunzi's group studies, we can get an insight into the embryonic form of Chinese sociology. During the Warring States Period, the disciplines were divided into 16 disciplines, and the Chinese Social Degree was ranked as the fourth discipline. Xunzi is defined as the first sociologist in China. In 1940, some scholars suggested that China also has indigenous sociology.

Sociology became a subject of academic interest in China in the 1920s, and in 1947 sociologist Fei Xiaotong published a book, From the Soil, that sought to establish a framework for detailing Chinese society and its moral and ethics. A few years later, in 1949, the Communist Party established control of Mainland China, and by 1952 sociology was banned by communist authorities as a bourgeois pseudoscience, similar to what happened in other communist countries (see for example history of sociology in the Soviet Union or sociology in People's Republic of Poland). Existing sociologists were discriminated against during the Cultural Revolution and their works restricted. In 1979, Chinese communist leader Deng Xiaoping noted the need for more studies of the Chinese society and supported the reestablishment of the discipline. That year, in March, Chinese Sociological Association (CSA) was reestablished. Since then, sociology has been accepted as a useful tool for the state, and sociology graduates have often been employed in government institutions. Reestablishment of the field was also aided by the growing cooperation between Chinese and American sociologists. The American scholar Nan Lin's "The Next Step in the Sinicization of Sociology" mentioned that from the resumption of sociological research in mainland China after 1979, there are deviations and limitations in the construction of sociology in China today.

However, sociology suffered another setback in China after the 1989 Tiananmen Square protests and massacre. Sociology was seen as a politically sensitive discipline, and was replaced in the role of primary social science state adviser by economics. In recent years, with socio-economic policies such as the socialist harmonious society, sociology has been coming back to graces with Chinese policymakers.

1979–1988 was the initial stage of Chinese sociology. By the end of 1987, the study of the history of Chinese sociology had achieved important academic results, that is, the publication of two monographs on the history of Chinese sociology: Yang Yabin and Han Mingmo's work of the same name "History of Chinese Sociology". The period from 1989 to 1999 was the stage of contention in the study of the history of Chinese sociology. Entering the 21st century, Chinese sociology continues its strong development momentum, and research on the history of Chinese sociology is also constantly deepening. This is reflected in its research outputs, foremost among which is the continuous publication of academic monographs. The period from 1989 to 1999 was the stage of contention in the study of the history of Chinese sociology. After Han Mingmo published "The Historical Tradition of the Application of Chinese Sociology", three years later, Chen Shude published "Reflections on the History of Chinese Sociology", which put forward a different point of view from Han Mingmo on the stage and research scope of the history of Chinese sociology.

In 1993, Chen Shude's "Re-discussion of Several Questions in the Study of Chinese Sociological History-Answering Professor Han Mingmo's Criticisms and Questions" was published in "Sociological Research". One year later, Han Mingmo wrote: "The History of Chinese Sociology Is Not Equal to the History of the Spread and Development of Western Sociology in China-Three Discussions with Comrade Chen Shude". The history of communication and development can only be a unipolar academic standpoint based on Western sociology. It is a one-sided understanding that does not conform to historical facts. The development history of Chinese sociology should integrate Chinese social thoughts and cultural factors.

== Institutions ==
As of 2008, Chinese universities and social science academies for example :(Chinese Academy of Social Sciences) employ over 6,000 sociologists and their programs offer 74 bachelor's degrees in sociology, 87 master's degrees, and 16 doctoral degrees.

China has two representative sociology journals: the Journal of Sociological Research (JSR)(Shehuixue Yanjiu, published since 1986) and Society(社会 (学术期刊)) (Shehui, since 1982)."Society" (formerly "Journal of Sociology") is a sociology journal sponsored by the Department of Sociology of Shanghai University. It was founded in October 1981. It was the first sociology journal published after the restoration and reconstruction of Chinese sociology. "Sociological Research" is a professional academic publication sponsored by the Institute of Sociology of the Chinese Academy of Social Sciences. Its predecessor was "Sociological News" (internally issued). It was officially released to China and abroad on January 20, 1986. As the main academic journal of Chinese sociology, it has published 82 issues so far, and published more than 1,000 academic papers and survey reports, most of which are important and outstanding achievements of sociological scientific research in the past ten years, reflecting China from one aspect. The growth and development process of the academic research of sociology also reflects the academic level and research trends of the sociology circle in China today. There are also hundreds (about 900) university- or Institute-sponsored social science journals in which sociological research is often published, most notably, Chinese Academy of Social Sciences, Shanghai Social Sciences(上海社会科学院) and Social Science Frontiers(中国社会科学评价研究院).

As of 2005, Chinese universities had more than 70 departments of sociology, 186 departments of social work and social work, about 4,000 full-time teachers, and about 40,000 undergraduates and junior college students. The Chinese Academy of Social Sciences and the Communist Party Department have established more than 50 sociological research institutes with nearly 1,000 professional researchers. Each key university and important scientific research institution has 16 doctoral programs (25), 97 master's programs (115), and recruits 160 doctoral students and 1,083 master's students. There are more than 40 sub-disciplines of sociology. China has established first-level societies such as the Chinese Sociological Society and the Chinese Sociological Association Psychological Society, and several second-level societies such as the China Rural Sociology Society and the Chinese Society for Social Policy Research, as well as several professional committees. In 2006, the society also approved the establishment of a new family and gender major Committee. All provinces in China have generally established their own societies. In addition, many universities and research institutions have established several substantive and non-substantial related research centers.

== Focus and research ==
Chinese sociology, since its reestablishment in 1979, concentrates on applied, policy-oriented, empirical research, to justify its support by the state. A notable example of the use of sociology by state planners was the impact of works by Fei Xiaotong on the policies of industrialization and urbanization of the rural countryside. In the recent years, policy priorities have been shifting from efficiency and growth to social justice, in order to reduce social tension and maintain political stability. In particular, sociological research in China focuses on issues related to socioeconomic developments, such as social stratification, social mobility, community construction, state-society relations, migration and economic sociology.

In 2003, a large Chinese General Social Survey program (中国性别平等与妇女发展) began.

Chinese sociology has also been steadily moving from overemphasis on Marxism (see also Maoism and Marxist sociology).

On the other hand, there is a notable lack of theoretical research in Chinese sociology, as it is still looked upon unfavorably by the state.

Since 2003, Chinese sociological scholars believe that the history of Chinese sociology should be limited to Chinese popular sociology, and should focus on pure sociological theories and applied departments. At the same time, Chinese sociology began to integrate concepts from Chinese history to solve life problems. Compared with Western sociology, Chinese sociology has four basic characteristics: human nature, integration, connectivity, and applicability. The combination of these four basic characteristics constitutes the foundation of Chinese sociology. These characteristics are achieved through four characteristics. Reflected by basic concepts (group, theory, benevolence, and the golden mean). The history of Chinese sociology is the history of the formation and development of sociology in China. It is a history of self-development based on critically inheriting the rich traditional ideas in the history of Chinese social thought and introducing foreign sociology. The nearly 30-year pause that began in the 1950s tried to replace sociology with historical materialism, and the restoration and reconstruction of sociology marked that the construction of Marxist sociology was officially put on the agenda. Marxist sociology will naturally become the main content of the history of Chinese sociology.

=== Research on Family Marriage Issues ===
Under the leadership and auspices of Professor Lei Jieqiong, the "Study on Marriage and Family in Five Cities in China" began in 1983."Study on Marriage and Family in Five Cities" is one of the key topics of the Sixth Five-Year Plan of National Social Science. The full name is "The Status Quo and Development Trends of Urban Families in my country: A Study on Families in Five Cities". The research was initiated by the Institute of Sociology of China, Fudan University, and other institutions. The participating institutions include the Institute of Sociology of Tianjin Academy of Social Sciences, Beijing School of Economics, the Institute of Sociology of Shanghai Academy of Social Sciences, Shanghai University, etc. The famous sociologist Lei Jieqiong served The purpose of academic leadership is to explore the law of urban family development, study the best model of socialist family and predict its future based on understanding the changes and current status of urban families in China, and provide basic and suggestions for the country to formulate family policies. From 1979 to 1989, a large number of popular books and publications on family sociology came out. Among them, Deng Weizhi's "Various Family Problems" and Liu Dalin's "Family Sociology" were simultaneously published by Tianjin People's Publishing House in November 1983. "Random Talk" uses profound and simple methods to integrate family sociology knowledge into history and real life, and introduces relevant knowledge and theories by analyzing various family phenomena in history and real life.

=== Social Issues Research ===
As far as China is concerned, the current population problem is mainly the problem of overpopulation. In the early 1970s, the attitude of Mao Zedong and others changed, and the Chinese government began to implement family planning. Family planning policies of China have been implemented in the cities. In economically developed areas, birth control and "giving a child is good" have become a conscious behavior of women of childbearing age. However, in rural areas, because the old-age care model has not changed from family old-age care to social old-age care, and the current cultural and ideological qualities of farmers still lag behind modernization, the seriousness of China's population problem still exists. With the deepening of research, sociologists pay attention to the problem of population quantity and pay attention to the research of population quality and population mobility. For example, the concept of "reverse elimination of population quality" put forward by Zhou Xiaozheng (周孝正) divides the reverse elimination of Chinese population quality into "reverse elimination of physical fitness" and "reverse elimination of cultural quality", which is important for the development of the population quality of the entire Chinese nation. The alarm bell rang. In addition, there are also studies on the massive transfer of agricultural surplus labor caused by rural reforms. The "migrant labor wave" in the late 1980s attracted widespread attention in sociology, and a large number of results have emerged. For example, the book "Population Mobility and Urbanization in Contemporary China" edited by Gu Shengzu and Jian Xinhua published by Wuhan University Press in 1994 is for rural areas. The resettlement of surplus laborers proposes to take a road of urbanization in China that emphasizes both urbanization and rural urbanization and focuses on the construction of leading cities and towns.

=== Community research ===
Fei Xiaotong wrote, "Jiangcun Economy", a work that had a huge impact on anthropology and sociology, based on his first-hand data from his investigations in "Jiangcun" (Kaixiangong Village, Jiangsu Province). To compare social processes from different stages and make more scientific inferences, soon after the restoration of sociology, Fei Xiaotong began to trace Jiangcun. When Fei Xiaotong visited Jiangcun for the third time in 1981, he clearly proposed a plan to establish a social survey base in Jiangcun. In December of the same year, under the guidance of Fei Xiaotong, an investigation team composed of sociologists from Beijing, Tianjin, Shanghai, Nanjing, and other places came to Jiangcun for investigation. In the future, such investigations and studies continued to be carried out. By 1985, Fei Xiaotong organized the Jiangcun 50-year research team again to conduct a systematic, comprehensive, and in-depth investigation of the changes in Jiangcun for half a century and obtained a large number of valuable results. His works such as "Three Visits to Jiangcun", "Nine Visits to Jiangcun", and "Fifty Years of Jiangcun" have demonstrated his proposition that "there are more people and less land, and agriculture and industry are complementary". Since then, the research on Jiangcun is still developing in-depth. In 1993, he published Shen Guanbao's "A Quiet Revolution: Industry and Society in Southern Jiangsu's Rural Areas", which put Jiangcun into a macroscopic view of social changes and examined Jiangcun's social, economic, and cultural changes. In addition, other scholars have also conducted a lot of research on rural communities. For example, Zhang Yulin's "The Transformation and Modernization of Villages" and "A View of the All-round Social Development Issues from a Village in Southern Jiangsu", through a village survey, pointed out that the overall progress of society and economic development are interdependent and mutually promoted. There are also articles such as Zou Nongjian's "Towards Modernization of Southern Jiangsu Rural Areas" and other articles. While studying rural communities, sociologists also attach importance to the study of small towns and urban communities. The Sixth Five-Year Key Project (第六个五年计划 (中国)) of sociology in China, "Research on Small Towns in Jiangsu", pointed out the functions and roles of small towns, as well as the development and construction prospects of small towns. In addition, there are also works such as "Research on the Coordinated Development of Urban and Rural Development" edited by Zhang Yulin and others published by Jiangsu People's Publishing House in 1991, and "The Road of China's Urban and Rural Coordinated Development" edited by He Jinming published by Shanxi People's Publishing House in 1991. These results will reflect the thoughts and opinions of sociologists on small-town research, and explore the core issue in small-town research—the rise of the township and village enterprises, and the industrialization of rural areas, agricultural modernization, township industry, and cities at a deeper level. The coordination of industry and agriculture, combined with the construction of small cities and towns, has strongly promoted the coordinated development of the urban and rural economy and society in various parts of China.

=== Modernization problem ===
The study of modernization in China is first the translation and introduction of foreign modernization research results, and then the descriptive introduction. Since the end of the 1980s, the descriptive introduction has turned to in-depth analysis, and the scattered research has turned to systematic research. And research results have increased dramatically.

== See also ==
- Scientific Development Concept
- Xiaokang
