= List of Chinese sociologists and anthropologists =

This is a list of Chinese sociologists and anthropologists. The academic disciplines of sociology and anthropology were under active development in China in the 20th century.

== Chinese sociologists and anthropologists ==
Name	Alternative spelling	Year of birth	Year of death	Known for
Fei Xiaotong	Fei Hsiao-Tung	1910	2005	Role in establishing sociological and anthropological studies in China; social activism
Huang Wenshan		1898	1988	
Wu Dingliang	Woo Ting-Liang	1893	1969	Founder of Chinese physical anthropology
Wu Wenzao		1901	1985	Founded the Department of Sociology of Yunnan University. Also an ethnologist
Dong Tichen	Ti-Chen Tung	1931	1966	Pioneer of Chinese physical anthropology
Rahile Dawut	Rèyīlā Dáwútí	1966	Living	Uyghur ethnographer

== See also ==
- Chinese Academy of Social Sciences
- Chinese Social Sciences Citation Index
- List of anthropologists
