= Wu Qing =

Wu Qing may refer to:

- Wu Qing (athlete) (born 1988), Chinese Paralympic athlete
- Wu Qing (footballer) (born 1981), Chinese football player
- Wu Qing (politician, born 1937), Chinese former municipal councillor
- Wu Qing (politician, born 1965), China Securities Regulatory Commission chairman, former executive vice mayor of Shanghai and chairman of the Shanghai Stock Exchange
