= Marxist sociology =

Study of sociology from a Marxist perspective

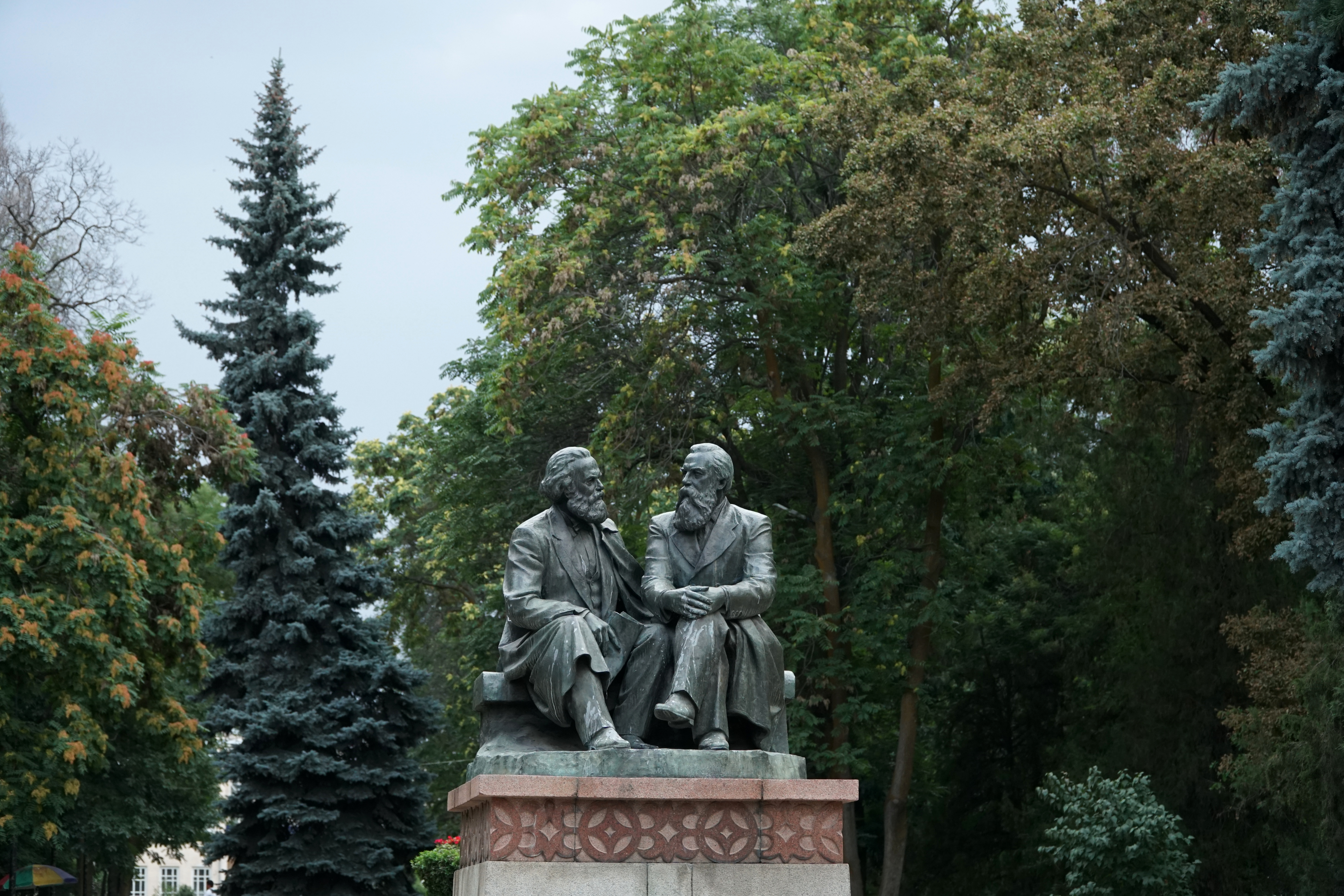
Statues of Marx and Engels in Bishkek, Kyrgyzstan

Marxist sociology is the application of Marxist epistemologies within the study of sociology. It can often be economic sociology, political sociology or cultural sociology. Marxism itself is recognised as both a political philosophy and a social theory, insofar as it attempts to remain scientific, systematic, and objective rather than purely normative and prescriptive. This approach would come to facilitate the developments of critical theory and cultural studies as loosely distinct disciplines. Marx himself has been considered a founding father of sociology.

The foundational basis of Marxist sociology is the investigation of capitalist stratification. An important concept of Marxist sociology is "a form of conflict theory associated with…Marxism's objective of developing a positive (empirical) science of capitalist society as part of the mobilization of a revolutionary working class." The American Sociological Association (ASA) has a section dedicated to the issues of Marxist sociology that is "interested in examining how insights from Marxist methodology and Marxist analysis can help explain the complex dynamics of modern society."

== Concepts and issues ==
Marxist sociology is primarily concerned with, but not limited to, the relations between society and economics. More specifically, key concepts in the sub-field include historical materialism, modes of production, and the capital-labour relation. Marxist sociology is also concerned with the way in which police forces are used to control indigenous populations, enslaved peoples, and the labouring poor in the name of capitalism.

Key questions asked by Marxist sociologists include:

- How does capital control workers?
- How does a mode of production influence the social class?
- What is the relation between workers, capital, the state and culture?
- How do economic factors influence inequalities such as those relating to gender and race?
- What role do police play within Marxist socialism?

Within theoretical field, Marxist sociology is recognized as one of the major sociological paradigms and is associated with conflict and critical theory. Unlike Marxism and Marxist philosophy, Marxist sociology has put relatively little weight on creating class revolution, pursuing instead the development of an objective, politico-economic study of society rather than a critical philosophy of praxis. As such, it may be understood as a field of economic sociology.

The study of "socio-nature" emerged from this line of thought. Socio-nature is "a concept that is used to argue that society and nature are inseparable and should not be analyzed in abstraction from each other."

== Historical development ==
Influenced by the thought of Karl Marx, Marxist sociology emerged around the turn of the 20th century. The first Marxist School of sociology was known as Austro-Marxism, of which Carl Grünberg and Antonio Labriola were among its most notable members.

Much of the development in the field occurred on the outskirts of academia, pitting Marxist against "bourgeois" sociology. For some time, this division was reinforced by the Russian Revolution that then led to the creation of the Soviet Union. Soon, however, sociology found itself a victim of the suppression of "bourgeois" science within the Soviet Union. While, after several decades, sociology was reestablished in the Communist states, two separate currents of thought evolved within Marxist sociology:

- Soviet Marxism: a Marxist-Leninist school that developed under 20th-century Communism (primarily the Soviet Union) to serve state interests. The school was heavily influenced by Marx's theory of historical materialism.
- Western Marxism: a Marxist school centered on the studies of Marxism in the West. It would become accepted within Western academia during the 1940s, and would subsequently fracture into several different perspectives, such as the Frankfurt School (critical theory)

Due to its former state-supported position, there has been a backlash against Marxist thought in post-Communist states (e.g. sociology in Poland). However, Marxist sociology is still dominant in sociological research that is sanctioned and supported by remaining Communist states (e.g. sociology in China).

== List of Marxist sociologists ==
- Benedict Anderson
- Perry Anderson
- Giovanni Arrighi
- Zygmunt Bauman
- Himani Bannerji
- Michael Burawoy
- Simon Clarke
- Oliver Cox
- W. E. B. Du Bois
- John Bellamy Foster
- Paulo Freire
- Erich Fromm
- Antonio Gramsci
- Stuart Hall
- John Holloway
- Max Horkheimer
- Bob Jessop
- Boris Kagarlitsky
- Henri Lefebvre
- Marcel Liebman
- Michael Löwy
- Maria Mies
- Robert Miles
- Ralph Miliband
- Antonio Negri
- Evgeny Pashukanis
- Nicos Poulantzas
- Gillian Rose
- Göran Therborn
- Lise Vogel
- Immanuel Wallerstein
- Erik Olin Wright
