= C. K. Yang (sociologist) =

American sociologist (1911–1999)

Ch'ing-k'un Yang
- Born: 1911; Guangzhou, Qing China
- Died: January 10, 1999 (aged 88–89)
- Spouse: Louise Chin 1914–2006
- Scientific career
- Fields: Sociology, Religion
- Workplaces: University of Pittsburgh
- Academic advisors: Robert E. Park

Chinese name
- Traditional Chinese: 楊慶堃
- Simplified Chinese: 杨庆堃
Transcriptions
Standard Mandarin
- Hanyu Pinyin: Yáng Qìngkūn
- Wade–Giles: Yang Ch'ing-k'un

Ch'ing-k'un Yang (Chinese: 楊慶堃; pinyin: Yáng Qìngkūn; 1911 – 10 January 1999), better known as C. K. Yang, was an American sociologist who supported the application of sociological theory to the study of China. He was known for his contributions to the study of Chinese religion and his argument that religion in China was "diffuse" and present in many aspects rather than being institutionalized in churches.

Yang was born in Guangzhou and educated at Yenching University, where he became interested in the study of sociology, and taught for much of his career at the University of Pittsburgh, where he trained American and Chinese sociologists and used periodic leaves of absence to build sociology programs in Hong Kong and the People's Republic of China.

In 2007, friends and colleagues published a festschrift in his memory, Social Change in Contemporary China: C. K. Yang and the Concept of Institutional Diffusion.

== Family and career ==
Born in 1911 in Canton, where his father owned both a wholesale fish market and land in the countryside, Yang was tutored at home in the Confucian classics. Over his father's objections, Yang decided to end his home tutoring and enter Yenching University, where he shared a room with Fei Xiaotong, who was to become China's leading anthropologist. The American sociologist Robert E. Park spent the year 1931 at Yenching, strengthening Yang's ambition to become a sociologist himself. Yang, Fei, and Wu Wenzao translated a collection of Park's sociological essays published by the Yenching Department of Sociology in 1934. After receiving his bachelor's and master's degrees from Yenching, Yang went to the United States and took his PhD in sociology at University of Michigan in 1939.

In December, 1939, he married Louise Chin, a Chinese-American whose parents operated a laundry in Queens. She graduated from Barnard College, earned a degree in social work from University of Pittsburgh, and worked for many years in the Pittsburgh public school system. The couple had two sons, Wallace and Wesley.

The first job Yang held after earning his PhD was as editor of the Chinese Journal, a New York City publication for which he investigated crime and local news in the Chinese American community. He then became an assistant professor at University of Washington, Seattle, where he taught from 1944 to 1948. In 1948, he became head of the sociology department at Lingnan University in Canton. Yang told an American friend that he could work with the new government because he agreed with them that foreign domination of China had to end. He and a group of his students did field studies in a nearby village. His eye-witness accounts became part of the books he published later, A Chinese Village in Early Communist Revolution and The Chinese Family in the Communist Revolution. Yang also worked with another group to translate articles written by Mao Zedong into English. But in 1951, after the outbreak of the war in Korea turned into a confrontation with the United States, Yang was warned that he would be arrested if he did not leave.

In 1951 Yang took his family to live in the United States, where he was research associate at the MIT Center for International Studies in 1951 and at Harvard in 1952. He became associate professor of sociology at University of Pittsburgh in 1953, full professor in 1958, and retired from Pittsburgh in 1981. He died on January 10, 1999.

== Intellectual innovations and scholarly contributions ==
Yang's first study published in English, A North China Local Market Economy (1944), summarized his pre-war field work in Zouping County, the site of Liang Shuming's work in rural reconstruction. Though brief, the study is considered a groundbreaking work.

C.K. Yang became known for his studies of the early years of the People's Republic of China, first The Chinese Family in the Communist Revolution (1954), then A Chinese Village in Early Communist Revolution (1959). He then turn to the field of Chinese religion, including Religion in Chinese Society (1961), which pioneered the application of functionalist theory to the study of religion in China. Yang argued that although it was not embodied in institutions such as churches, religion was nonetheless an important diffuse force in Chinese society.

During the 1960s, Yang began to use leaves of absence for a series of extended visits to universities in Hong Kong and other parts of Asia to strengthen their instruction in sociology.In the late 1970s, following the end of the Cultural Revolution, Fei Xiaotong invited Yang to return to China to give seminars in the newly rehabilitated discipline of sociology, but Fei was then criticized for wanting to "bring capitalism back to China" and the invitation was cancelled. Yang did return a few years later.

== Selected publications ==
- Yang, Ching-kin (1944). A North China Local Market Economy; a Summary of a Study of Periodic Markets in Chowping Hsien, Shantung. New York: Institute of Pacific Relations.
- Yang, Ching-kin (1946). 美國與留美 (Meiguo Yu LiuMei) [America and foreign study in America]. New York: Guoji jiaoyu she.
- Yang, C. K. (1954). The Chinese Family in the Communist Revolution. Cambridge, Mass.: M.I.T. Press.
- —— (1957). The Functional Relationship between Confucian Thought and Chinese Religion.
- Yang, C. K. (1959). A Chinese Village in Early Communist Transition. Cambridge, Mass.: The Technology Press/M.I.T. Press.
- Yang, C. K. (1959). Chinese Communist Society: The Family and the Village. Cambridge, MA: M.I.T. Press.
- Yang, C. K. (1961). Religion in Chinese Society. Berkeley and Los Angeles: University of California Press.
  - Yang, Qingkun (2007). 中国社会中的宗教: 宗教的现代社会功能与其历史因素之研究 (Zhongguo Shehui Zhong de Zongjiao: Zongjiao de xiandai shehui gongneng yu qili shiyin suzhi yanjiu) [Translation of Religion in Chinese Society]. Shanghai: Shanghai renmin chubanshe. ISBN 9787208064133.

=== Translation, introduction ===
- Park, Robert Ezra (1933). 派克社會學論文集 (Paike Shehuixue Lunwenji) [Sociological Essays of Robert Park]. Translated by Yang Qingkun; Wu Wenzao; Fei Xiaotong. Beiping: Yanjing da xue she hui xue hui.
- Weber, Max (1951). The Religion of China : Confucianism and Taoism. Introduction by C. K. Yang. New York: Macmillan.

== Sources ==
- Chen, Yong (2013). Confucianism as Religion: Controversies and Consequences. Leiden; Boston: Brill. ISBN 9789004243736.
- Holzner, Burkart (2007), C.K. Yang: Sociology in China and the Encounter of Civilizations, in Tang and Holzner (2007), BRILL, pp. 17–29, ISBN 9789004243781, also online at
- Guldin, Gregory Eliyu (1994). The Saga of Anthropology in China: From Malinowski to Moscow to Mao. Armonk, N.Y.: M.E. Sharpe. ISBN 1563241854.
- Sun, Qingzhong 孙庆忠 (2012). "杨庆堃的社会学研究及对中国社会学发展的贡献" [C. K．Yang and the study of Chinese society] (PDF). 河北学刊 [Hebei Academic Journal]. 32 (6): 111–116. Archived from the original (PDF) on 2015-09-06.
- Tang, Wenfang; Holzner, Burkart (2007). Social Change in Contemporary China : C.K. Yang and the Concept of Institutional Diffusion. Pittsburgh PA: University of Pittsburgh Press. ISBN 978-0822942979.
