= A Maze of Stars and Spring Water =

Two poetry collections by Bing Xin

A Maze of Stars (Fanxing) and Spring Water (Chunshui), are two collections of poetry written by Bing Xin. They were both published in 1923 when she was 19 years old and directly inspired the poetic movement of short poetry (xiaoshi in classical Mandarin) that emerged after the May Fourth Movement and the New Literature movement. A Maze of Stars and Spring Water are regarded as representative works of the short poetry genre and Bing Xin is considered as the cultural representative of the genre. Expressions remain common to refer to the short poetry genre such as "Bing Xin style", "Fanxing style" or "Chunshui style". A Maze of Stars was published in February 1923 and Spring Water was published three months later in May 1923. Bing Xin was inspired by Rabindranath Tagore's 1916 work Stray Birds. She wrote about nature, youth, abstract concepts of love and emotions and social and political perspectives.

== Background and writing ==
Bing Xin was one of the first writers to use the short poem structure in a poetry book and she was inspired by Rabindranath Tagore's work Stray Birds. She acknowledged his influence over her writing style in her introductory essay, "How I Wrote A Maze of Stars and Spring Water" originally published in Shi Kan in 1954 and reprinted in 1982.

She started to gather her pieces of work in 1919 while she was completing a bachelor's in Literature in the Arts faculty of Yenching University. The first short pieces were published in Beijing's Chen Bao, a newspaper published in Shanghai, in 1919. The title A Maze of Stars comes from the way Bing Xin gathered the words and sentences that sounded poetic, resonant and suggestive to her. According to Bing Xin, the title of the first book, A Maze of Stars (Fanxing in Chinese), comes from her "scattered and fragmentary thoughts". The second book is called Spring Water (Chunshui in Chinese).

Bing Xin admitted in her introductory essay, "How I Wrote A Maze of Stars and Spring Water", about the New Poetry movement that she did not understand it at the time and that she did not feel entitled to be one of the representatives of the movement. It wasn't until February 1919, when she wrote a short piece of her work called Beloved and sent it to the Chenbao Literary Supplement that she felt legitimated. The editor eventually rearranged the lines of her poems and she admitted that she felt confident to write New Poetry after that moment.

== The influence of Tagore ==
Bing Xin openly picked her influence from the New Literature and the poetry book Stray Birds written by Rabindranath Tagore. Bing Xin wrote in her introductory essay that she started to write her thoughts at 19 years old after she had discovered Tagore's poetry book, Stray Birds, in an attempt to imitate the form of his art. The structure of her poetry is inspired from Tagore's structure, who wrote short and concise poems. Bing Xin was inspired by Tagore's poems that consisted of a few lines of irregular length.

Bing Xin in her introductory essay admitted that she earlier thought poetry had to respect formal rules and that the musicality of her poetry had to be pronounced. Therefore, she did not consider her work as poetry. Originally, classic poetry had been following writing rules: authors had to write in regulated verses and lines of five or seven monosyllables that belonged to a fixed pattern with a set-end rhymes scheme. In her introductory essay, Bing Xin explains that when she realized that length, conciseness and constraints such as rhythm and tonal patterns, could be erased, she started to write differently. Indeed, she used her own style to write poems with no more than 12 characters per line, and no poems with less than three lines or more than fourteen lines.

Tagore also influenced Bing Xin's poetry when it comes to the images that she chose to introduce in her poems. Bing Xin and Tagore both write about nature through the natural elements and phenomena of light and darkness. Furthermore, the authors both find inspiration in the seasons, the celestial objects like the moon, the sun and the stars and the fauna. Finally, Bing Xin's images about abstract concepts of time, love, loneliness, death and eternity are inspired by Tagore's themes. However, she presented them with the perspective of a Chinese woman who lived during a revolutionary time.

== Themes ==
=== Nature ===
Bing Xin finds her inspiration in the natural elements and celestial objects. The first book, Fanxing, contains the word flower 15 times. Sixty of the poems in Fanxing are about nature and one hundred and two poems of Chunshui are about nature. Bing Xin uses the images of natural elements like water, fire, "sand" and "rocks". She perceives the beauty of nature and positively describes natural elements with terms like "blossoming" and "beautiful". Celestial objects like the moon, the sun and the stars are wrote in poems with words like "clouds", "sky" and "earth".

The author writes about the relationship between nature and time. The seasons are personified in the second book, Spring Water, to symbolize the time passing by. The poem "Autumn is late./The leaves of the trees put on red garments" symbolizes the relationship between nature and the time. Another poem, "Sunflower faces these men who have never seen a lotus bloom [...]/Lotus rises from the water. /Sunflower sinks." is a metaphor of the time passing by.

=== Youth ===
May Fourth Movement inspired writers and poets and the flagship journal of the movement was called New Youth. The name referred to the youth of Chinese society and the hope for a future for the Chinese nation. Bing Xin was involved in the democratic movement in favour of the May Fourth Movement and she used to be the secretary for the Students' Association of the Union College, as she composed occasional propaganda pieces for May Fourth Movement.

Bing Xin uses specific words and figures of speech to represent the role of children and the youth. She uses a lyrical field to express her feelings for children in the poem "I can't tell how deep,/these children in my heart" and she uses the subject "you" to talk directly to the young people. The children, on one hand, are portrayed by the author as innocent human beings in the poem "Numberless angels/Will rise to sing the praises of a child./A child –/This fragile flesh/Enfolds a great spirit".

On the other hand, Bing Xin directly speaks to the youth. The preface has several poems that include direct messages to the youth through the language of nature ("Delicate shoot,/To the youth you say:/'Extend yourself.'"). She also talks directly to the young people in the poem "Youth–/Trust in yourself./Only when you take hold of the truth/Will you be able to become yourself". The author uses opposition figures of speech to represent the youth and the older generations in the poem: "An old man's past, And a young man's future".

=== Love and emotions ===
May Fourth Movement inspired writers to express their feelings through personal stories and autobiographical poems and writings. Bing Xin uses the first-person perspective and elements of her life to write her poetry. The autobiographical aspect of her poems is inspired by the sentiment of love she feels for her relatives. She uses the metaphor of nature as her mother and father to express her emotions for them. For instance, she expresses her love and sadness of missing her mother in the poem "Western hills, farewell. I cannot bear to leave you, but the memory of my mother lingers painfully". She also writes to her father through the natural elements in the poem "Father-/Comes out into the moonlight./Let me hear you describe the sea".

She also expresses her fear of the time destroying love, by using the lexical field of melancholia, loneliness, and death in opposition to life and love. The poem "Fate – /cannot even intellect resist you?/Life – Death,/All within your sway". Life and death are represented by the natural elements such as seasons in the poem: "A man breaks off a flowering branch,/And puts it in a vase –/When autumn comes and fruits ripen,/He sighs over bare twigs". The parallel between eternity and death is made through the opposition between the two lexical fields in poems like "And yet,/What I cast abroad is ephemeral,/What I seek is eternal".

=== The social and political perspectives ===
Bing Xin was a writer and poet that was part of the May Fourth Movement advocating for democracy and freedom. Bing Xin, like Chinese writers of the movement, used the vernacular language or what we call baihua (Plain Speech) instead of the classical Chinese language as an act of rebellion and change. The New Literature movement, which arose from the May Fourth Movement, was lyrical as Zhou Zuoren explained that "as for the meaning of literature, though different schools have different theories, we can say that in origin and essence it is the expression of the writer's emotions" (Zhou Zuoren, 1920: 138). A Maze of Stars and Spring Water represent autobiographical poetry books that reflect the emotions of the writer, symbolizing spontaneity and freedom in writing. Bing Xin discusses themes like love, death and the beauty of nature that are lyrically expressed.

Bing Xin, as a modern Chinese female writer, was inspired by Li Qingzhao, a respected female poet in Chinese literature. When she was studying at Wellesley College from 1924 to 1926, Bing Xin studied her poems for her academic project and her master's thesis. The work she published inspired by Li QingZhao is called the English Translation and Edition of the Poetry of the Lady Li I-An. Bing Xin writes about maternal love in her poems, and she reflects on the relationship between mothers and daughters. She uses the autobiographical point of view to talk to her mother in the poem "Mother/lay aside your sadness/Let me bury myself in your breast./You alone can still my heart.".
