= Pearl River Model =

Development model of China

The Pearl River Model (Chinese: 珠江模式), also known as the Pearl River Delta Model or Pearl Delta Model, refers to the unique development path of the Pearl River Delta region in Guangdong Province, China (centered on cities such as Guangzhou, Shenzhen, Dongguan, Foshan, Zhongshan, and Zhuhai) during the early stages of China's reform and opening-up. It was proposed by Fei Xiaotong in the 1980s.

The Pearl River Model, along with the Sunan Model and Wenzhou Model is regarded as one of the three major regional economic development models in the early phase of China's reform and opening-up. However, its most prominent feature is its highly outward-oriented nature and industrialization driven by foreign capital under strong local government guidance. Its core driving force stems from the geographical advantage of being adjacent to Hong Kong and Macau, achieving a rapid transition from a traditional agricultural society to a modern industrial society through large-scale attraction of foreign investment and the development of processing trade.

== Background ==
With the launch of China's reform and opening-up, the Pearl River Delta region took advantage of special policies granted by the state (such as the establishment of the Shenzhen and Zhuhai Special Economic Zones) and overseas Chinese resources to be the first to undertake the transfer of labor-intensive industries from Hong Kong, Taiwan, and other places. In 1985, the State Council officially designated the Pearl River Delta region as the Pearl River Delta Economic Open Zone.

== Core features ==
In its early stage, the Pearl River Model mainly exhibited the following distinctive characteristics:

- Three Supplies and One Compensation (三來一補): Namely, processing incoming materials, processing according to incoming samples, assembling incoming parts, and compensatory trade. Enterprises utilized local cheap labor and land to engage in low-value-added assembly processes.
- Front Shop, Back Factory: A close industrial division of labor formed with Hong Kong. Hong Kong served as the "front shop," responsible for receiving orders, financing, design, and marketing; the Pearl River Delta served as the "back factory," responsible for production and manufacturing.
- Outward-Oriented Drive: Economic growth was highly dependent on exports, with capital inputs mainly coming from foreign direct investment.
- Township Economy: It formed industrial clusters centered on specialized towns, such as electronic components in Dongguan, lighting in Zhongshan, and furniture in Foshan.

== Development course and evolution ==
Entering the 21st century, the Pearl River Model underwent multiple upgrades:

- 2001–2010: After joining the WTO, the Pearl River Delta shifted from primary processing trade to large-scale industrial chain supporting, becoming an important global production base for electronic information products.
- 2010–Present: Due to rising labor costs and resource constraints, Guangdong Province proposed the "cage-for-bird" policy (腾笼换鸟), promoting the transformation from "Made in China" (中國製造) to "Intelligent Manufacturing in China." (中國智造)
- Current Stage: The model has now been integrated into the Guangdong-Hong Kong-Macao Greater Bay Area strategy, emphasizing deep integration of Shenzhen-Hong Kong technological innovation with finance, logistics, and services across the entire region.
