= C. K. Yang =

C. K. Yang may refer to:

- C. K. Yang (sociologist) (Ch'ing-k'un Yang), Chinese-American sociologist
- Yang Chuan-kwang, Taiwanese decathlete
