= Hiram Harrison Lowry =

American Christian missionary (1843–1924)

Father Hiram Harrison Lowry D.D., M.A.

Personal details
- Born: May 29, 1843 Zanesville; Muskingum County; Ohio
- Died: January 13, 1924 (aged 80) Beijing
- Education: Ohio Wesleyan University

Hiram Harrison Lowry
- Traditional Chinese: 劉海瀾
- Simplified Chinese: 刘海澜
Transcriptions
Standard Mandarin
- Hanyu Pinyin: Liú Hǎilán
Eastern Min
- Fuzhou BUC: Làu Hāi-làng

Hiram Harrison Lowry (May 29, 1843 – January 13, 1924) was an educator, Methodist clergyman and college president in China.

== Early life ==
Lowry was born on May 29, 1843, in Zanesville, Ohio, to Hiram and Margaret née Speare. He graduated from the Ohio Wesleyan University, and received the degrees of Bachelor and Master of Arts and Doctor of Divinity. In 1862–1863 Lowry served during the American Civil War in the ninety-seventh regiment of the Ohio Volunteer Infantry. In 1867 he was ordained to the ministry of the Methodist Episcopal Church and was sent out to China.

== China ==
On October 10, 1867, Lowry arrived with his wife, Parthenia Nicholson, in Fuzhou, where they labored till 1869. In 1869 he was sent to Beijing, where the foundations of the work of the North China Mission was laid. In 1870, Lowry built up the first Methodist church in Northern China, the Asbury Church (today the Chongwenmen Church in Beijing), named after the American Methodist Bishop Francis Asbury. From 1873 to 1893, Lowry served as superintendent of North China Mission (until it became the North China Annual Conference) and since 1914 president of Huiwen University (匯文大學), the precursor of Yenching University (燕京大学). From 1894 until it became a union institution, he was president of Huiwen University, later be part of Yenching University, where he trained thousands of young Chinese who are now active in Christian work, in business, the professions and in government.

Lowry retired in 1922 and died in Peking on January 13, 1924. He was survived by six children: George Davis Lowry, Edward Kinsley Lowry, Fanny May Lowry, Grace Ernestine (Lowry) Hooper, Ernest Wilbur Lowry, and Mabel Annetta (Lowry) Dobson.
