= China Centenary Missionary Conference =

1907 Protestant missionary conference in Shanghai

The China Centenary Missionary Conference, held in 1907 in Shanghai, China commemorated 100 years of Protestant missionary work in China and debated future courses of action. Among other actions, the conference approved a resolution endorsing the exclusion from Chinese law given Chinese Christians in the "unequal treaties" imposed on China by European countries, the United States, and Japan.

== The Conference ==
The Conference celebrated the centenary of the arrival of the first Protestant missionary to China, Robert Morrison. It was convened on April 25 and adjourned on May 8, 1907.

Attendees at the Conference totaled 1,170 persons, mostly missionaries from every province of China and with representatives from 25 countries. About 100 missionary organizations were operating in China, although not all were present at the conference. Most attendees were British and American. Despite the fact that the subject of the conference was the promotion of Christianity in China fewer than 10 Chinese can be identified among the delegates. Also, although missionary wives and single women missionaries outnumbered male missionaries in China, women were under-represented. Luella Miner chaired a committee related to women's work.

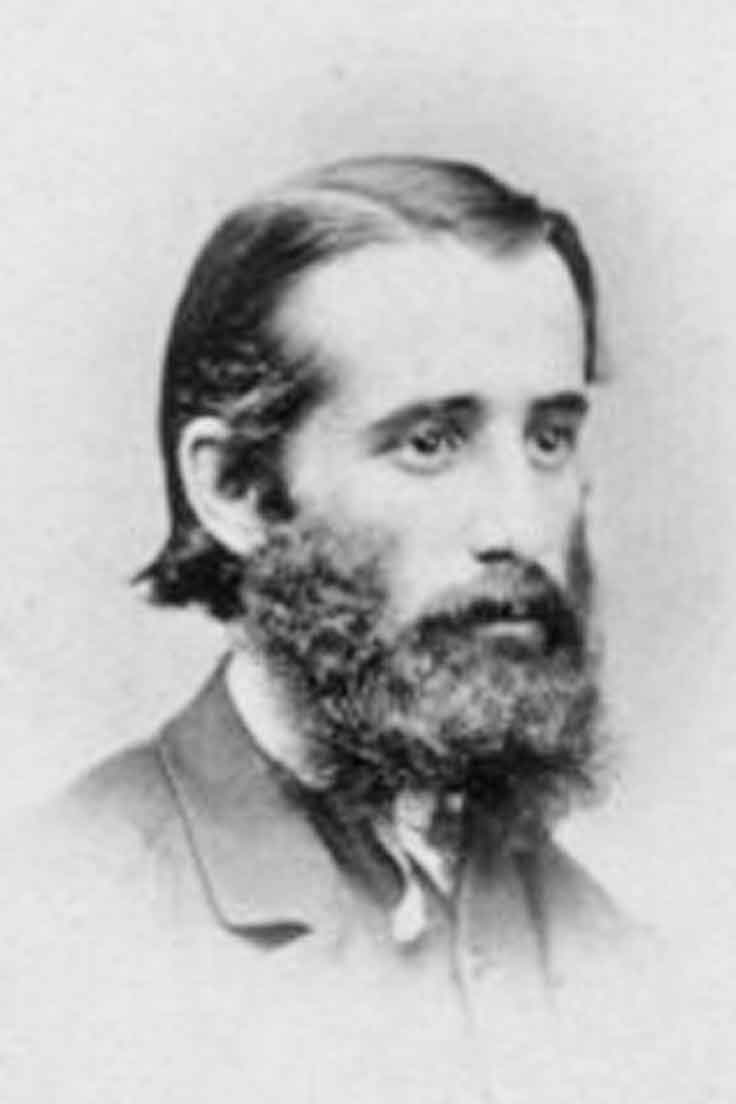
Congregationalist author-missionary Arthur Henderson Smith was elected co-chairman of the Conference.

American missionary author and Congregationalist Arthur Henderson Smith and British Presbyterian John C. Gibson were elected joint chairmen for the Conference. Eleven Committees presented resolutions on different subjects of interest to the delegates.

== Debate and Decisions ==
The tenor of the Conference was optimistic. The martyrdom of 189 Protestant missionaries – men, women, and children—during the Boxer Rebellion seven years before was hardly mentioned. Since the Boxer Rebellion, the Chinese government had undertaken a large number of internal reforms and missionaries perceived a much greater openness by the Chinese to Western influences, including Christianity.

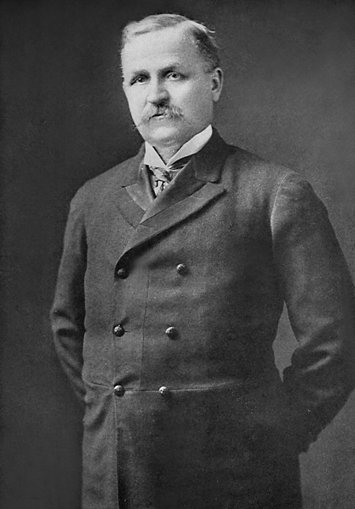
Missionary William Scott Ament, famous for his clash with Mark Twain, headed a Committee at the Conference.

The missionaries celebrated their success in converting about 180,000 Chinese to Christianity during the previous 100 years. However, J. W. Lowrie interjected a negative note into the conference by saying that "the far larger part of this century's sowing [i.e. spreading Christianity]... has been on fallow ground," an acknowledgement that the missionaries had often been disappointed at the pace of their progress and their results.

A major objective of many at the Conference was to unite Protestant efforts into a single coordinated body rather than the diverse and often competitive efforts of many different missionary organizations. William Scott Ament chaired the Committee of Federation and Comity which established a framework for united action. The Conference also called for an expansion of resources devoted to education and medical work – to the discomfort of evangelical missionaries who said that "education is not...a substitute for preaching."

The most divisive and controversial issues at the Conference were the privileges and exemptions from Chinese law given Chinese Christians under the unequal treaties. Some missionaries wanted to forgo these protections of Chinese Christians as "a hated yoke upon the [Chinese] government" and an encouragement for unscrupulous Chinese to become Christians for personal advantage. The majority disagreed and the resolution adopted by the Conference stated that "the time has not come when all the protection to Christian converts provided in the treaties can safely be withdrawn."

== Consequences ==
The missionaries at the 1907 Conference "did not see any need to make fundamental adjustments or to reorient the missionary movement in China." Events soon proved they were short-sighted. The optimism of the missionaries that Christianity would continue to progress in China was soon dashed as was the spirit in favor of "federation and comity." The Qing dynasty fell in 1911 and it was followed by an era of chaos and warlords and the increasingly hostile identification of Christianity with Western colonialism and imperialism. Within 10 years the spirit of Protestant unity and cooperation coming out of the Conference was undermined by disagreement between fundamentalists and liberals.
