= From the Soil =

1947 book by Fei Xiaotong

- English translated copy from 1992
- Author: Fei Xiaotong
- Original title: 乡土中国
- Language: Chinese
- Subject: Sociology, anthropology
- Genre: Scholarly monograph
- Publication date: 1947
- Publication place: China
- English publication date: 1992

From the Soil (simplified Chinese: 乡土中国; traditional Chinese: 鄉土中國; pinyin: Xiāngtǔ zhōngguó), first published in 1947, is a work by Fei Xiaotong, a Chinese sociologist and anthropologist. The book is a compilation of the author's lecture notes and a series of essays he wrote for Chinese journal Shiji Pinglun. Banned in Mainland China shortly after the communist takeover and in Taiwan due to Fei's perceived support of the Communist regime, the book remained available in the Chinese-speaking world only in Hong Kong until the 1980s, when Fei was rehabilitated and instated as a professor at Peking University. It was only translated into English in 1992.

Fei wrote the book in an effort to develop a conceptual framework for depicting the moral and ethical characteristics of Chinese society, while simultaneously contrasting Chinese society's organizational structure with Western society. According to Fei, the title came from his trying to convey the idea that "the Chinese people come from the soil". Originally written with a Chinese audience in mind for the purpose of explicitly delineating the unique characteristics of their society, the book is also popular outside of China as a way to study and relate to Chinese society.

== History ==
From the Soil is a compilation of lecture notes from courses author Fei Xiaotong taught on Chinese rural society in the 1940s, and a series of essays he wrote for Shiji Pinglun, a Chinese intellectual journal. Published in 1947, From the Soil quickly became one of Fei's most widely read books, and along with Reconstructing Rural China made Fei famous within China's intellectual circles. Even though Fei supported the Chinese Communist Party, following their consolidation of rule on the mainland his works were nonetheless branded as "rightist" and "anti-Marxist" and were subsequently banned; in neighboring Taiwan, Fei's works were similarly restricted because he had expressed support for the Communist party, although From the Soil remained available in Hong Kong. During these years, however, Fei's books (but not From the Soil) were translated into English and spread to the West, where they became widely read.

After Fei was rehabilitated and sociology re-instated as a discipline in China in 1979, he was hired as a professor at Peking University and began teaching From the Soil as one of three required texts to small groups of graduate students.

== Themes ==
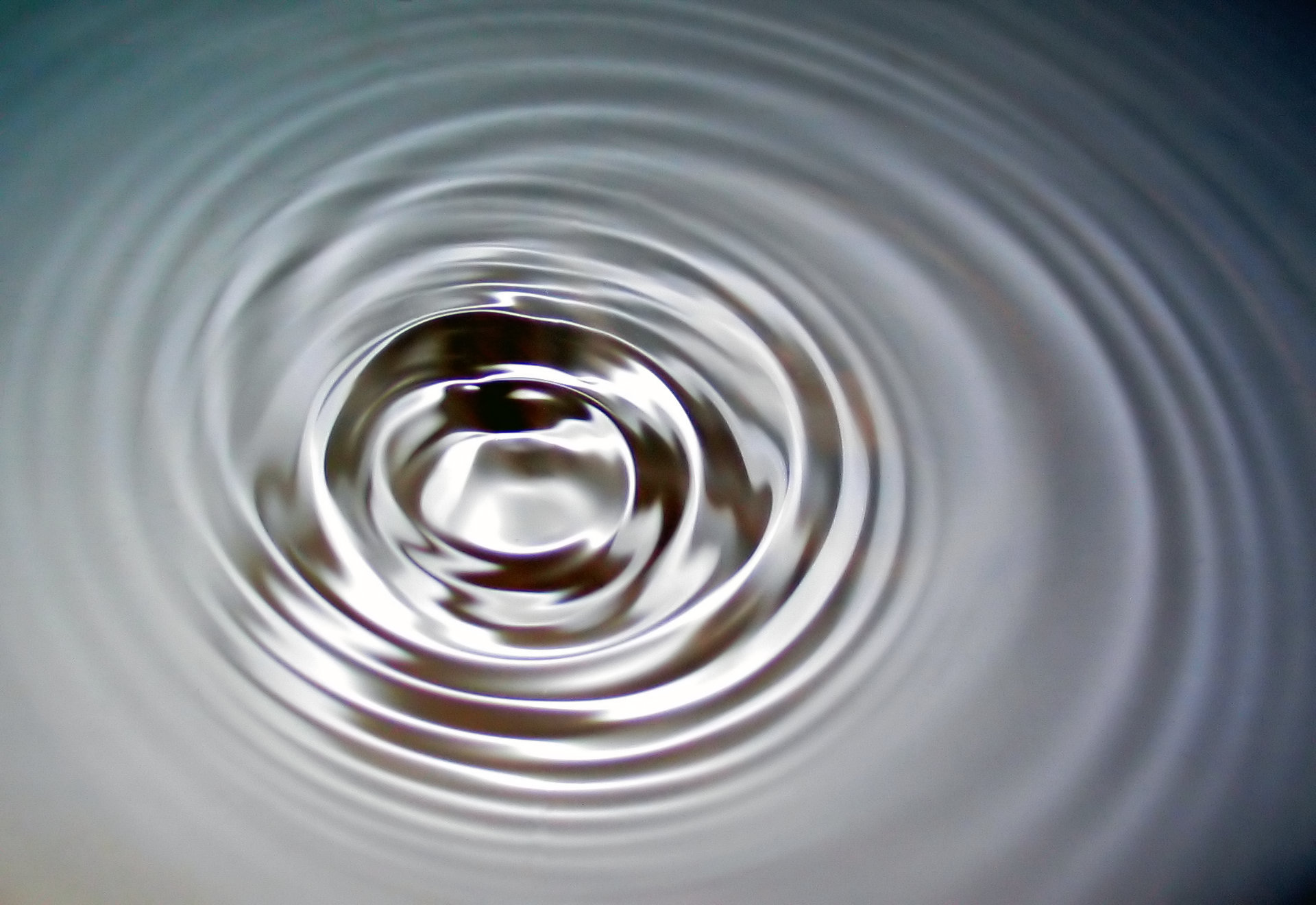
Fei uses the imagery of water rippling from a center as a metaphor for Chinese society's focus on the self in regards to relationships and guanxi.

The primary theme of From the Soil is that Chinese people were "inseparable from the soil" which nurtured Chinese society but also limits its potential, a description that Andrea Janku calls "the portrait of a rural and inward looking country".

Fei also tackles the issue of selfishness in Chinese society, lamenting how the beautiful canals of Suzhou are routinely marred by garbage thrown in by residents with no sympathy for their fellow neighbors who use the canal's water to wash their clothes and vegetables. He uses the concentric ripples of a pebble hitting water as an analogy for Chinese societal structure to explain this selfishness, in what he calls a "self-centered quality" inherent in Chinese social relationships. In addition, he explains how kinship form the nexus of social relationships, governed under rules called guanxi, with every relationship falling under one of many distinct categories. Those falling further from the center (self) of the metaphorical ripples are categorized differently than those falling closer to the center. Fei further explains the unspoken rules of guanxi, explaining that rights and obligations to one another must be balanced and favors must be returned over set periods of time to prevent relationships from being severed.

He also observes how Chinese political structure is on a "two-track" system: one centered on the central government and the other on local government, with each trying to influence the other with varying levels of success. Within this context, Fei offers suggestions on political reform that rest on restoring strong local power.

== Reception ==
While From the Soil was banned in much of the Chinese-speaking world mere years after its publication, today it is one of Fei's most widely read books and, according to The New York Times, is a "cornerstone of modern sociology and anthropology. While Gary Hamilton and Wang Zheng called Fei's prose "disarming", they also observed that Fei possessed a deep understanding of Western sociological thought, mentioning and borrowing ideas from Western thinkers such as Emile Durkheim, George Herbert Mead, and William James. The University of California Press, its publisher in English, calls the book both "succinct and accessible" and "likely to have a wide impact on Western social theorists". According to Hamilton, "it is through this book that many Westerners can now learn about China."
