= Wu Dingliang =

Chinese anthropologist

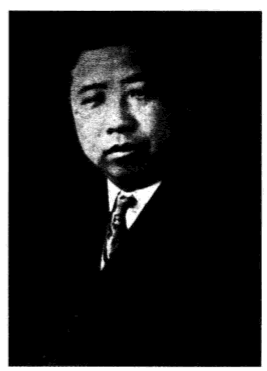
- Born: January 1893; Jintan, Qing China
- Died: 24 March 1969 (age 76); People's Republic of China
- Scientific career
- Fields: anthropologist

Wu Dingliang (Chinese: 吴定良; January 1893 – 24 March 1969), also known as Woo Ting-Liang, was a pioneering Chinese anthropologist and educator. He is considered the founder of Chinese physical anthropology.

== Biography ==
Wu was educated in Britain during the 1920s and came back to China after he obtained a doctor's degree in anthropology. He continued his work in Academia Sinica as the director and researcher of the Group of Anthropology in the Institute of History and Language. His research concentrated on somatometry, description of biological variation of ethnic minorities in China. He collected morphological measurements and described physical characteristics of living people in different parts of China. He also prepared the foundation of Institute of Physical Anthropology. He published more than 10 papers on physical anthropology, for example, in 1942, he published "the Physical Characteristics of Miao in South China" in "Journal of Anthropology" edited by Britain Royal Society. Moreover, Wu Dingliang set up and edited "Renleixue Jikan"(Communication on Anthropology).

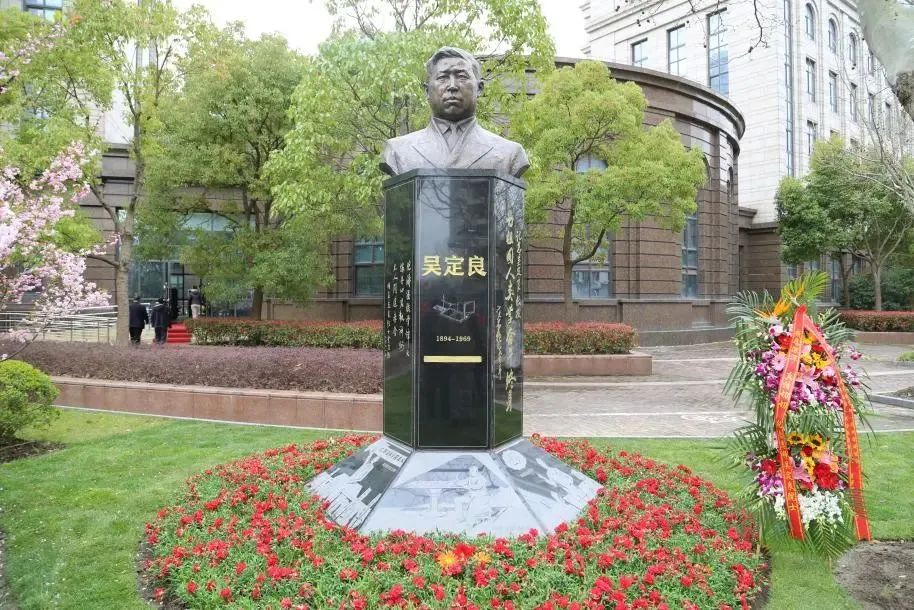
The statue of Professor Wu Dingliang

In 1941, Wu published the paper "Somatometry of Chinese in the Plain of North China" (including 190 indexes of somatometry) in Vol.2 of "Communication on Anthropology". In Sept.of 1947, the Department of Anthropology and the Institute of Anthropology were set up at Zhejiang University, Wu Dingliang assumed the dean of the department and the chief of the institute. Wu Dingliang educated many students that became prominent scholars of physical anthropology. Among them are Zhang Yinyun and Han Kangxin. In the period from 1946 to 1948, he also worked as part-time professor in the department of anthropology at Jinan University in Shanghai. In 1948, Wu Dingliang was elected as academician of Academia Sinica.

During the 1950s, Wu and Liu Xian invited Dong Tichen and Zhao Yiqing to Fudan University. They created the first teaching and research unit of physical anthropology in China.

During the Cultural Revolution, while bedridden, he was publicly denounced and humiliated, and his home was raided multiple times. In 1969, during the campaign to purge 'May 16 elements,' he was implicated once again. His residence was ransacked anew. As the elderly and paralyzed Mr. Wu watched helplessly, his life's work—bound volumes of academic papers—along with his research tools, such as slide rules, straight calipers, and curved calipers, were confiscated. He broke down, sobbing uncontrollably. That very night, his condition worsened dramatically, and by the following morning, the persecution had driven him to his death.

== Sources ==
T. L. Woo and G. M. Morant, 1932, A Preliminary Classification of Asiatic Races Based on Cranial Measurements [monograph], Academia Sinica Monograph of the National Research Institute of Social Sciences, No.7

Communication on Anthropology https://web.archive.org/web/20100507105727/http://comonca.org.cn/

== See also ==
- Fei Xiaotong
