= He Jinming =

Chinese politician

- 何金铭

Communist Party Secretary of Dexing
- In office May 2011 – June 2014
- Preceded by: Chen Ronggao
- Succeeded by: Xie Guansen

Mayor of Dexing
- In office May 2010 – May 2011

Governor of Hengfeng County
- In office January 2006 – May 2010

Personal details
- Born: November 1968 (age 57) Shangrao, Jiangxi, China
- Party: Chinese Communist Party (expelled)
- Education: Shangrao Normal University

Chinese name
- Traditional Chinese: 何金銘
- Simplified Chinese: 何金铭
Transcriptions
Standard Mandarin
- Hanyu Pinyin: Hé Jīnmíng

He Jinming (Chinese: 何金铭; born November 1968) is a former Chinese politician, and former Chinese Communist Party Committee Secretary of Dexing, a county-level city in Jiangxi province. He was investigated for corruption in 2014, tried and convicted on charges of bribery, and sentenced to eleven years in prison.

== Life ==
He was born and raised in Shangrao, Jiangxi. He entered Shangrao Normal University in September 1985, majoring in history, where he graduated in August 1988. After graduation, he taught at Fenglingtou High School (枫岭头中学).

He worked as a local officer in the Government of Shangrao County from 1990 to 2006.

In January 2006, He was promoted to become the Chinese Communist Party Deputy Committee Secretary and mayor of Hengfeng County, a position he held until May 2010, when he was transferred to Dexing and appointed the CCP Party Vice-Chief and Mayor. In May 2011, he was elevated to the Chinese Communist Party Committee Secretary of Dexing.

On June 4, 2014, He was placed under investigation by the Shangrao Municipal Discipline Inspection Commission for "serious violations of laws and regulations". The internal party investigation concluded that he took bribes, abused power, and committed adultery; he was promptly expelled from the Chinese Communist Party and his case moved to criminal prosecution. He was tried at the Intermediate People's Court in Jingdezhen on charges of bribery. In June 2015, he was convicted of taking bribes worth some 2.49 million yuan, and sentenced to eleven years in prison.

Party political offices
Preceded by Chen Ronggao	Communist Party Secretary of Dexing; 2011–2014	Succeeded by Xie Guansen
