= Arthur Henderson Smith =

Missionary and author from the United States in China (1845–1932)

- Chinese: 明恩溥
Transcriptions
Standard Mandarin
- Hanyu Pinyin: Míng Ēnpǔ
- Wade–Giles: Ming2 En1-p'u3

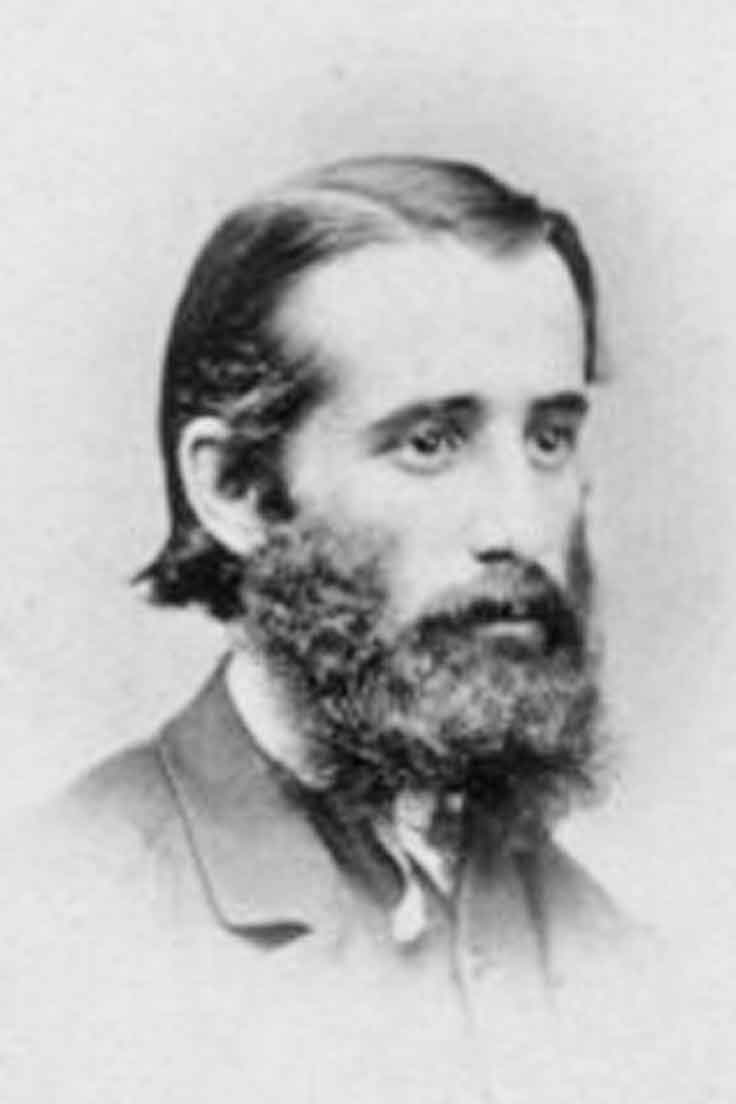
Arthur Henderson Smith (1845-1932)

Arthur Henderson Smith (July 18, 1845 – August 31, 1932) (Chinese name: 明恩溥; pinyin: Ming Enpu) was a Christian missionary and a member of the American Board of Commissioners for Foreign Missions, noted for spending 54 years as a missionary in China and writing books that presented China to foreign readers. These books include Chinese Characteristics, Village Life in China, The Uplift of China and China in Convulsion (1901), which describes his time under siege in Beijing (Peking) in the Boxer Rebellion. In the 1920s, Chinese Characteristics remained the most widely read book on China among foreign residents there.

== Biography ==
Smith was born in Vernon, Connecticut, to a middle-class Protestant family described by historian Lydia H. Liu as "rich on either side with clergy and local respectability." He came from a line of respected clergymen and scholars. His father was a pastor in Williamstown, Massachusetts and his grandfather was a pastor in Greenwich, Connecticut who later became the president of Marietta College. He served in the Wisconsin Infantry in the Civil War before graduating from Beloit College in 1867 as valedictorian, and was a part of the Hundred Days Men. He then briefly attended Andover Theological Seminary before taking a degree in 1871 from Union Theological Seminary. After marrying Emma Jane Dickinson, he was ordained into the Congregational ministry. The couple sailed for China in 1872. After two years of language study in Tianjin, they established themselves at Pangzhuang, a village in Shandong, where they stayed until the Boxer Uprising. Smith was among only two Beloit College alumni to go to China as a missionary before the Boxer Uprising, the other being Henry D. Porter.

In 1907, Smith was elected the American co-chair of the China Centenary Missionary Conference in Shanghai, a conference attended by more than 1,000 Protestant missionaries, and was a member of the editorial board of the Chinese Recorder. He retired in 1926, 54 years after his arrival in China. His wife died the same year. He died in California in 1932 at the age of 87.

Smith's "Rex Christus: An Outline Study of China" (1904) was a brief presentation of "a few selected topics" ranging from the religions to the make up of the soil. He also spoke out against the Chinese practice of infanticide of girls, drawing attention to this often-ignored practice.

== The Boxer Uprising ==
The Boxer Rebellion, which Smith called the "Boxer Movement," was an anti-foreign, anti-imperialist, and anti-Christian uprising in North China between 1899 and 1901, towards the end of the Qing dynasty. One of the missionaries there, possibly Smith, named the participants, mostly farmers, the “Boxers” because of their athletic rituals. Following the First Sino-Japanese War, villagers in North China feared the expansion of foreign spheres of influence and resented the extension of privileges to Christian missionaries, who used them to shield their followers. The events came to a head in June 1900, when Boxer fighters, convinced they were invulnerable to foreign weapons, converged on Beijing with the slogan "Support the Qing government and exterminate the foreigners". Smith and his wife were attending a missionary conference in Tongzhou in May 1900 when all the missionaries in Northern China found it necessary to seek safety from the Boxers by fleeing to Beijing or Tianjin. The missionary William Scott Ament rescued Smith, 22 other American missionaries and about 100 Chinese Christians in Tongzhou and escorted them to Peking. They took refuge in the Legation Quarter during the siege of the legations from June 20 to August 14, 1900.

Smith's role in the siege was a minor one as a gate guard, but he gathered material for his book, China in Convulsion, which is the most detailed account of the Boxer Rebellion. In 1906, Smith helped to persuade President Theodore Roosevelt to devote the indemnity payments China was making to the United States to the education of Chinese students. More than $12 million was spent on this Boxer Indemnity Scholarship Program.

== Influence and legacy ==
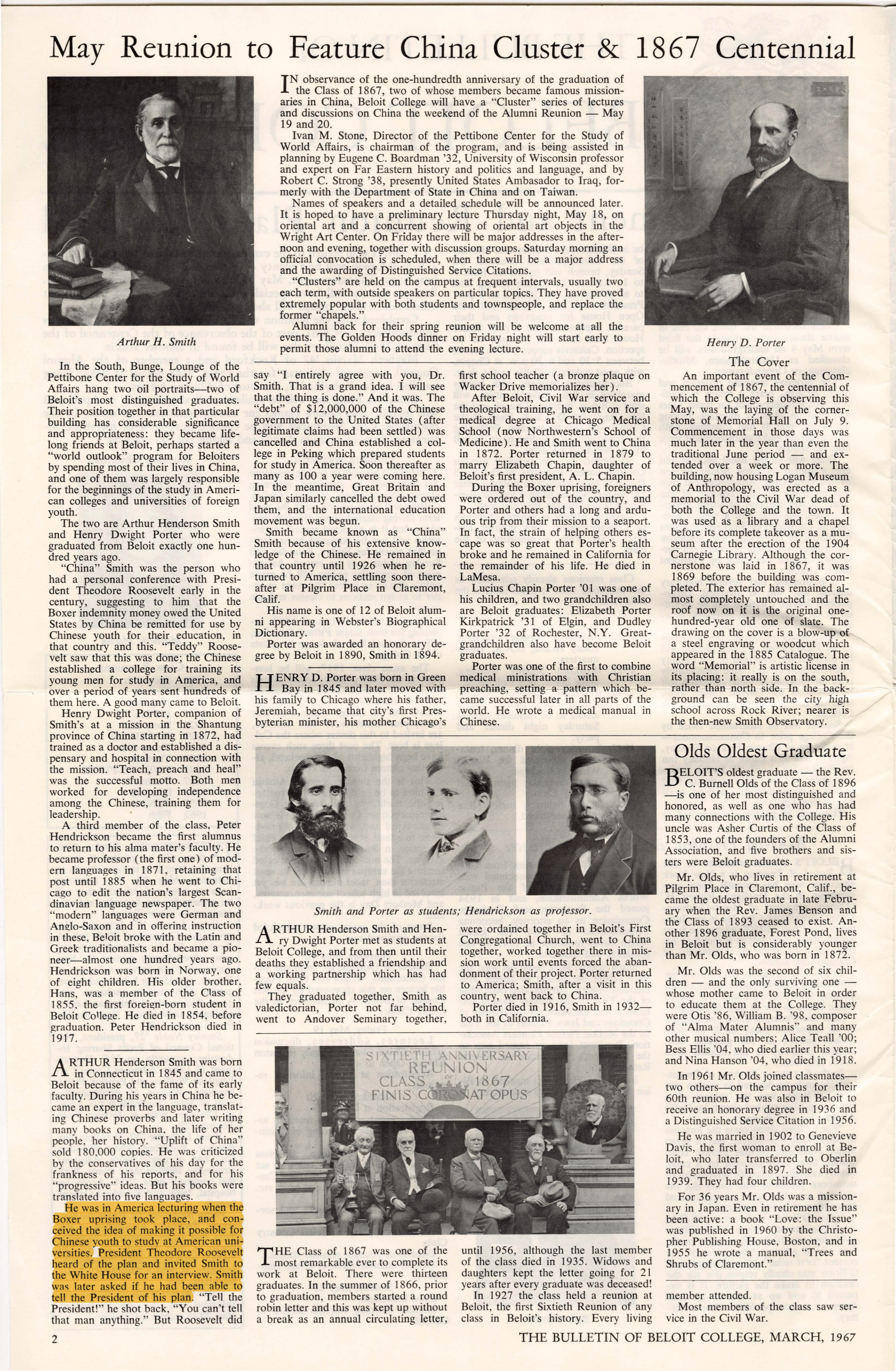
Bulletin of Beloit College, 100 Years After 1867 Graduation of Arthur H. Smith and Henry D. Porter. Highlighted mention of Smith's plan to educate Chinese youth in America

Smith's acerbic style and pithy judgments excited interest in both Chinese and Westerners. Chinese Characteristics was translated into Japanese, and from that translation into Chinese. One study found that among English readers the book was the most widely read book on China until it was replaced by Pearl Buck's The Good Earth (1931). Gu Hongming, who idealized Imperial China, harshly criticized Smith, but the pioneer of China's new literary language Lu Xun wrote that he was influenced by Chinese Characteristics.

Smith drew a range of comment from later Western historians and critics. Harold R. Isaacs, in his influential Scratches on Our Minds (1958), said Smith wrote with a "suggestion of exhausted patience" as he undertook to write in the "scholarly manner", complete with "prefatory warnings against generalizations and a text dotted with sweeping statements." Isaacs quoted extensively from Smith and singled out examples of his dismissive characterization of Chinese society. He wrote that Smith also deplored the widespread use in the United States of the phrase "John Chinaman" applied to all Chinese because it spread the idea that all Chinese were alike and had no individual identities Timothy Cheek for instance, wrote that Smith's work exemplified the ‘thinly disguised racism’ contained in the writings of many Protestant missionaries in China at that time.

== Selected works ==
- Chinese Characteristics (New York: Revell, 1894). Various reprints: EastBridge, D'Asia Vue, with a Preface by Lydia Liu, 2003. ISBN 1-891936-26-3. Online at Internet Archive here
- Village Life in China; a Study in Sociology. New York, Chicago [etc.]: F. H. Revell Company, 1899. Various reprints.
- China in Convulsion. New York,: F. H. Revell Co., 1901. Volume 1 Volume 2
- Proverbs and Common Sayings from the Chinese: Together with Much Related and Unrelated Matter, Interspersed with Observations on Chinese Things-in-general (1902)
- Rex Christus: an outline study of China (1904)
- The Uplift of China (1907)
- China and America To-day: A Study of Conditions and Relations, Volume 1 (1907)
- Proverbs and Common Sayings from the Chinese, Together with Much Related and Unrelated Matter, Interspersed with Observations on Chinese Things in General. New York, 1914. Reprint, Paragon 1965.
