= Ava Milam Clark =

American home economist

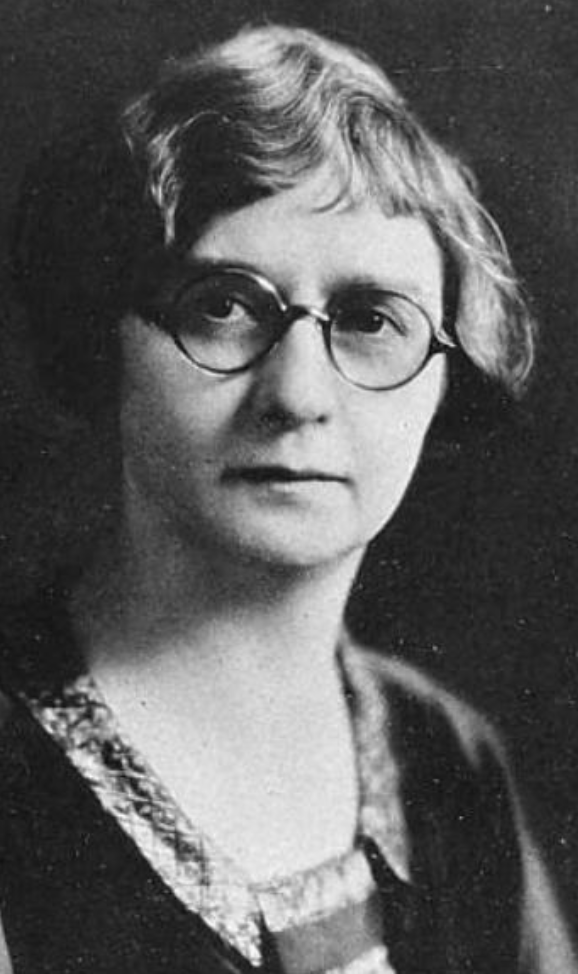
- Ava B. Milam, from a 1928 publication
- Born: November 27, 1884; Macon County, Missouri, U.S.
- Died: August 24, 1976 (aged 91); Corvallis, Oregon, U.S.
- Other names: Ava B. Milam
- Occupations: Home economist, college dean

Ava Bertha Milam Clark (November 27, 1884 – August 24, 1976) was an American home economist and college professor. She was dean of the School of Home Economics at Oregon State College from 1917 to 1950, and she helped to establish the home economics department at Yenching University in China in the 1920s. She also taught in Korea in the 1940s, and in Syria in the early 1950s.

== Early life and education ==
Milam was born and raised in Macon County, Missouri, one of the five daughters of farmers Ancil Milam and Mary Louisa McGinnis Milam. She had a twin sister, Ada. She graduated from the University of Chicago in 1910, and earned a master's degree in nutrition there in 1911. Her master's thesis was titled "Factors Affecting the Economic and the Dietetic Value of Foods. No. 1. A Study of Cakes" (1911). Among her instructors at Chicago were Marion Talbot and Sophonisba Breckinridge.

== Career ==
Milam taught domestic science at Oregon State College, where she was named dean of the School of Home Economics in 1917, and remained dean until her retirement in 1950. From 1922 to 1924, she and her former student Camilla Mills worked in China, establishing the home economics department at Yenching University. She organized a study tour of Korea for American home economists in 1937, and taught in Korea in the 1940s. She also worked in Japan and the Philippines.

In retirement Clark worked as a technical advisor in Syria and Iraq for the Food and Agriculture Organization of the United Nations, and wrote her autobiography, Adventures of a Home Economist (1969). In 1956 she was named Home Economist of the Year by the Oregon Home Economics Association. In 1966 she received the Golden Torch Award from the Oregon State Federation of Business and Professional Women.

== Publications ==
- "Principles of Cake Making" (1913)
- "Comparative cooking qualities of some of the common varieties of apples grown in Oregon" (1915, with Harriet B. Gardner)
- "The School Luncheon" (1916, with Anna M. Turley and Helen Cowgill)
- "A Unique College Exhibit" (1916)
- "Baby Week" (1917)
- Camp Cookery: A Cookery and Equipment Handbook for Boy Scouts and Other Campers (1918, with Alma Grace Johnson and Ruth McNary Smith)
- "Standards of Living among Intermediate Income Groups in China" (1927)
- A Study of Student Homes in China (1930)
- "The Challenge in China" (1947)
- "Home Economics: A Basic Need for the Orient" (1949)
- "Home Economics Workshop in Syria" (1952)
- Adventures of a Home Economist (1969, with J. Kenneth Munford)
- "The Home Economics Movement" (1972)

== Personal life ==
Ava Milam married Jesse Claude Clark in 1952; he died in 1956. She died in 1976, at the age of 91, at a nursing home in Corvallis. Her papers are in special collections at Oregon State University Libraries. Milam Hall at OSU was named for her at a rededication in 1976.
