= Luella Miner =

American educator and missionary in China (1861–1935)

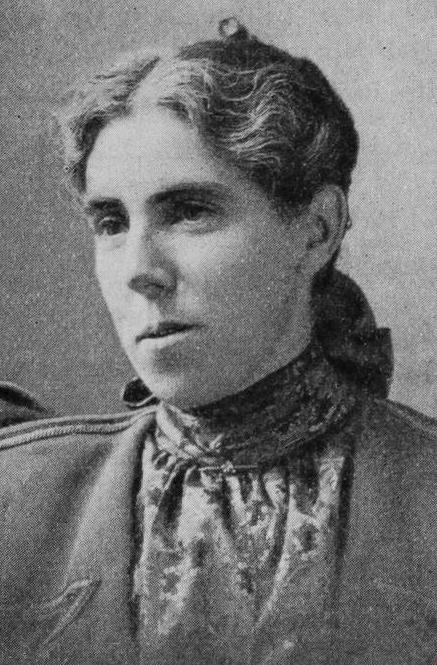
- Luella Miner, from an 1898 publication.
- Born: October 30, 1861; Oberlin, Ohio, United States
- Died: December 2, 1935 (aged 74); Jinan, China
- Occupation: Christian missionary in China
- Known for: Founder, North China Union Women's College (1905)
- Notable work: China's Book of Martyrs; Two Heroes of Cathay

Sarah Luella Miner (October 30, 1861 – December 2, 1935) was an American educator and a Christian missionary in China from 1887 until her death in 1935. She founded and led the North China Union College for Women, China's first women's college.

== Early life ==
Miner was born in Oberlin, Ohio, the daughter of Daniel Irenaeus Miner and Lydia Jane Cooley Miner. Her father was a missionary and teacher; after the American Civil War he taught freedmen at Tougaloo College in Mississippi, and Miner trained as a teacher there. She completed a bachelor's degree at Oberlin College in 1884. She received an honorary Doctor of Letters degree from Oberlin College in 1914.

== Career ==
=== Teaching ===
After a stint at Fisk University, Miner became a teaching missionary in China, commissioned by the American Board of Commissioners for Foreign Missions (ABCFM) in 1887. She studied Chinese, including literary Chinese, at Paotingfu. From 1888 to 1902, she taught at Luho School for Boys and the North China Union College in Tungchow. In 1900 she was among the foreigners besieged in the foreign legations in Beijing during the Boxer Rebellion.

In 1901, she escorted two Chinese students, H. H. Kung and Fei Ch'i-hao, to Oberlin College. She helped fund their education with the sale of a book, Two Heroes of Cathay, which also included her plea against the Chinese Exclusion Act: "We have made the laws. If they are working injustice, it is ours to change them." While in the United States in 1901, she also spoke at the meeting of the Woman's Board of Missions of the Interior, held at Oberlin. In 1907, Miner chaired the Women's Committee at the China Centenary Missionary Conference in Shanghai.

In 1903, she moved to Peking and was principal of the Bridgman Academy, a girls' school, for a decade. She founded the North China Union College for Women in 1905, China's first college for women, and served as the college's dean until 1922. At Shantung Christian University, she was dean of women and taught theology, from 1922 to 1932. Miner represented China on the International Missionary Council when it met in Jerusalem in 1928.

=== Writing ===
Miner wrote Text Book of Geology for use in Chinese schools. She wrote about her experiences in the Boxer Rebellion in Two Heroes of Cathay (1902), and in another book, China's Book of Martyrs: A Record of Heroic Martyrdoms and Marvelous Deliverances of Chinese Christians During the Summer of 1900 (1903). She also published a school history, Evolution of a woman's college in China: North China Union Woman's College, Peking (1914); Christian Education of Chinese Women (Chicago, n.d.)

== Death and legacy ==
Miner died from pneumonia at Jinan, China, in 1935, aged 74 years. Her former student H. H. Kung paid for her funeral "as a traditional mark of respect". There is a residence hall at Yenching University Women's College named for Miner. Miner's papers can be found in the ABCFM papers at Harvard's Houghton Library. There is also a small collection of her papers at the University of Washington Libraries.
