= Bing Xin =

Chinese writer

Bing Xin (Xie Wanying)
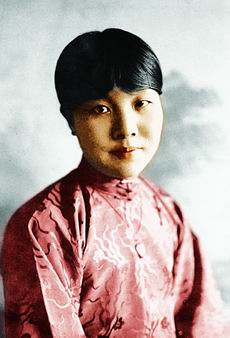
- Bing Xin in the 1920s.
- Born: 5 October 1900; Fuzhou, Fujian, Qing Empire
- Died: 28 February 1999 (aged 98); Beijing, China
- Education: Yenching University, Wellesley College
- Spouse: Wu Wenzao
- Children: Wu Qing
- Parent(s): Xie Baozhang (謝葆璋); Yang Fuci (楊福慈)
- Awards: 1998 Lu Xun Literary Prize

Bing Xin
- Chinese: 冰心
- Literal meaning: "Ice Heart"
Transcriptions
Standard Mandarin
- Hanyu Pinyin: Bīng Xīn
- Wade–Giles: Ping^{1} Hsin^{1}
- IPA: [píŋ ɕín]

Xie Wanying
- Traditional Chinese: 謝婉瑩
- Simplified Chinese: 谢婉莹
Transcriptions
Standard Mandarin
- Hanyu Pinyin: Xiè Wǎnyíng

Xie Wanying (simplified Chinese: 谢婉莹; traditional Chinese: 謝婉瑩; October 5, 1900 – February 28, 1999), better known by her pen name Bing Xin (Chinese: 冰心) or Xie Bingxin, was one of the most prolific Chinese women writers of the 20th century. Many of her works were written for young readers. She was the chairperson of the China Federation of Literary and Art Circles. Her pen name Bing Xin (literally "Ice Heart") carries the meaning of a morally pure heart, and is taken from a line in a Tang dynasty poem by Wang Changling.

Bing Xin published her first prose in the Morning Post (Chinese: 晨報) The Impressions of the 21st Hearing and her first novel Two Families in August 1919. Before and after studying abroad in 1923, she began to publish prose letters Jixiaoduzhe (To Young Readers; Chinese: 寄小讀者), which became a foundation stone of Chinese children's literature. Bing Xin was hired by the University of Tokyo as the first foreign female lecturer to teach a Chinese New Literature course. She returned to China in 1951.

== Life ==
Bing Xin was born in Fuzhou, Fujian, moved to Shanghai with her family when she was seven months old, and moved again to the coastal port city of Yantai, Shandong when she was four. These moves had a crucial influence on Bing Xin's personality and philosophy of love and beauty, as the vastness and beauty of the sea greatly expanded and refined young Bing Xin's mind and heart. It was also in Yantai that Bing Xin first began to read the classics of Chinese literature, such as Romance of the Three Kingdoms and Water Margin, when she was just seven.

Bing Xin entered Fuzhou Women's Normal School and started preparatory study in 1911. In 1913, Bing Xin moved to Beijing. She entered the science department of North China Union Women's University (華北協和女子大學) and began to learn to become a doctor. Influences by the May Fourth Movement and the New Culture Movement, Bing Xin transferred to the Department of Literature. The May Fourth Movement in 1919 inspired and elevated Bing Xin's patriotism to new high levels, starting her writing career as she wrote for a school newspaper at Yanjing University where she was enrolled as a student and published her first novel. While at Yanjing in 1921, Bing Xin was baptized a Christian, but was throughout her life generally indifferent to Christian rituals.

Bing Xin graduated from Yanjing University in 1923 with a bachelor's degree, and went to the United States to study at Wellesley College, earning a master's degree at Wellesley in literature in 1926. Before and after studying abroad, she wrote prose about her journeys while traveling in foreign countries and sent them back to China for publication. The collection was To Young Readers, which was an early work of Chinese children's literature. She then returned to Yanjing University to teach until 1936.

In 1929, she married Wu Wenzao, an anthropologist and her good friend when they were studying in the United States. Together, Bing Xin and her husband visited different intellectual circles around the world, communicating with other intellectuals such as Virginia Woolf.

In 1940, Bing Xin was elected a member of the National Senate , and became a respected figure among Chinese and foreign people.

During the Second Sino-Japanese War, she wrote guanyu nüren (About Women) under the pen name Nan Shi (Mr. Man) in Chongqing, and actively engaged in creation and cultural salvation activities in Kunming, Chongqing and other places. Her 1943 My Standards for a Wife satirized the misogyny of the Republic of China era.

After war period, Bing Xin worked at the Department of New Chinese Literature at the University of Tokyo, and taught the history of Chinese new literature from 1949 to 1951, and published some short articles in local newspapers , which made it very famous.

Later in her life, Bing Xin taught in Japan for a short period and stimulated more cultural communications between China and the other parts of the world as a traveling Chinese writer. In literature, Bing Xin founded the "Bing Xin Style" as a new literary style. She contributed a lot to children's literature in China (her writings were incorporated into children's textbooks), and also undertook various translation tasks, including translating the works of Indian literary figure Rabindranath Tagore.

Because of the translation of Kahlil Gibran's The Prophet, Sand and Foam, Rabindranath Tagore's Gitanjali, The Gardener and other works, she was awarded the National Order of the Cedar by the president of the Republic of Lebanon in 1995. Tagore's prose poems inspired Bing Xin. She wrote the influential prose letters To the Little Readers, which was the best example. Affected by Tagore's pantheism, Bing Xin's creation moves towards the chant of tender love. With Tagore's influence, Bing Xin also created Fanxing and Chunshui. Bing Xin said, when she wrote Fanxing (A Maze of Stars)繁星 and Chunshui (Spring Water)春水, she was not writing poems. She was just influenced by Tagore's Stray Birds and wrote these "fragmented thoughts" in a few words in her notebook then collected into a collection.

Bing Xin's literary career was prolific.

During the Cultural Revolution (1966–1976), Bing Xin and her family were denounced. She was sent to a May Seventh Cadre School in Xianning, Hubei province.

After the Cultural Revolution, Bing Xin ushered in the second creative climax in her life. In June 1980, Bing Xin suffered from cerebral thrombosis, but she still insisted on writing. The short story Kongchao (Empty Nest)空巢 was published during this period and won the National Excellent Short Story Award.

In September 1994, Bing Xin was admitted to Beijing Hospital due to heart failure. From February 13, 1999, her condition deteriorated and she died on February 28, 1999, in Beijing Hospital at the age of 98. Shortly before her death, Zhu Rongji, Li Ruihuan, Hu Jintao and other central leaders, as well as leaders and writers' representatives of the China Writers Association visited her in person in the hospital.

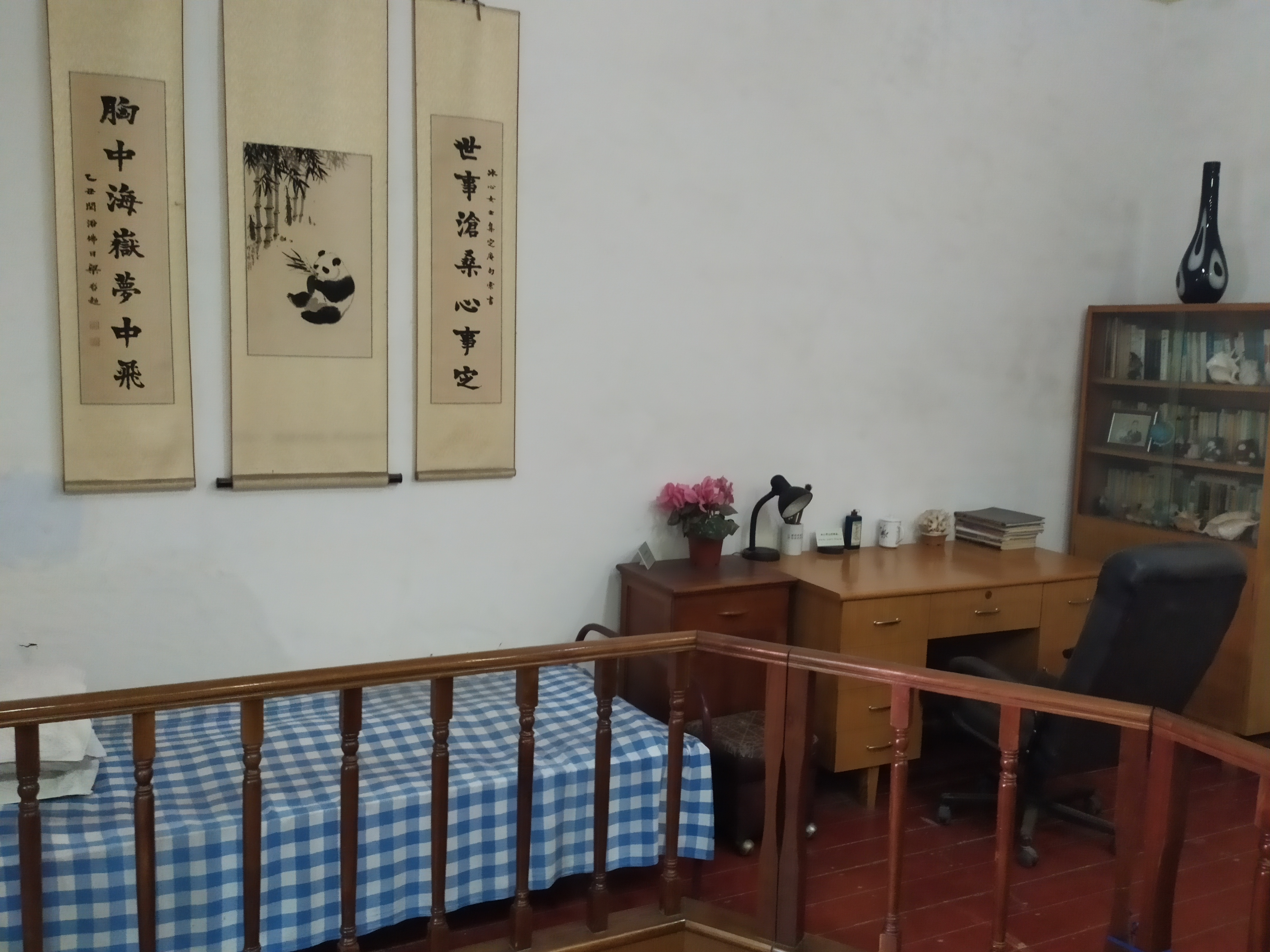
Photo of Bing Xin's bedroom displayed in Bing Xin Literature Museum in Fujian Province.

== Legacy ==
- There is a Bing Xin Literature Museum in Changle in Fujian Province.
- The Bing Xin Children's Literature Award (冰心兒童文學新作獎) is named in her honour. Her daughter Wu Qing continues to be involved with the award.

== Selected works ==
- Liangge Jiating (两个家庭, Two Families) (1919)
- Jimo (寂寞, Loneliness) (1922)
- Xianqing (閒情, Leisure) (1922)
- Chaoren (超人, Superhuman) (1923)
- Fanxing (繁星, A Myriad of Stars) (1923)
- Chunshui (春水, Spring Water) (1923)
- Liu yi jie (六一姐, Six-one sister) (1924)
- Ji xiao duzhe (寄小讀者, To Young Readers) (1926)
- Nangui (南歸, Homeward South) (1931)
- Wangshi (往事, The Past) (1931)
- Bing Xin Quanji (冰心全集, The Collected Works of Bing Xin) (1932–1933)
- Yinghua zan (櫻花讚, Ode to Sakura)
- Wo men zheli meiyou dongtian (我們這裡沒有冬天, No Winter in My Hometown) (1974)
- Wo de guxiang (我的故鄉, My Home) (1983)
- Guanyu nuren (關於女人, About Females) (1999)

=== Poetry ===
- "Stars·Spring Water", Shanghai Commercial Press, 1923
- "The Complete Works of Bing Xin Part 2: Collected Poems of Bing Xin", Shanghai Beixin Book Company, 1932; Kaiming Publishing House, 1943

=== Prose ===
- "The Complete Works of Bing Xin Part 3: Collected Prose by Bing Xin", Shanghai Beixin Book Company, 1932; Kaiming Publishing House, 1943
- "Travel Notes along Pingsui Railway", Pingsui Railway Administration, 1935
- "About Women", Shanghai Tiandi Publishing House, 1943
- "Returning to the South", Shanghai Beixin Book Company, 1945
- "After Returning", Writers Publishing House, 1958
- "We Awakened the Spring", Baihua Literature and Art Publishing House, 1960
- "Ode to Cherry Blossoms", Baihua Literature and Art Publishing House, 1962
- "Xiaozha Gleaners", Writers Publishing House, 1964
- "Selected Prose by Bing Xin", Beijing People's Literature Publishing House, after 1983, Bing Xin wrote other novels in 1984

=== Novels ===
- "The Complete Works of Bing Xin Part 1: Collected Novels of Bing Xin", Shanghai Beixin Book Company, 1932; Kaiming Publishing House, 1943
- "Going to the Country", Shanghai Beixin Book Company, 1933
- "Dong'er Girl", Shanghai Beixin Book Company, 1935
- "Aunt", Kaiming Publishing House, 1987

=== Letters ===
- "Past Events", Peking Xinhua News Agency, 1931

=== Children's literature ===
- "Tao Qi's Summer Diary", Beijing Children's Publishing House, 1956
- "Miscellaneous Notes on Returning Home", Beijing Children's Publishing House, 1957
- "Remail to Little Readers", Beijing People's Daily, Children's Times, 1958
- "For Young Readers (26 articles in total)", Kaiming Publishing House, 1978
- "Three Letters to Little Readers", Beijing Children's Publishing House, 1981
- "Only Picking Children and Traveling to Many Places", Beijing Children's Publishing House, 1981
- "Selected Works of Bing Xin", Beijing Children's Publishing House, 1982

=== Discussions ===
- "Memory Beads", Beijing People's Literature Publishing House, 1982
- "Bing Xin on Creation", Shanghai Literature and Art Publishing House, 1982

=== Collections ===
- "Leisure" (poetry, prose), Shanghai Beixin Book Company, 1922
- "Selected Novels and Essays of Bing Xin" (novels, essays), China International Humanities Publishing House, 1954
- "Little Orange Lantern" (novel, prose, poetry), Writers Publishing House, 1960
- 1980* "Wanqing Collection" (prose, novels), Baihua Literature and Art Publishing House, 1980
- "Selected Works of Bing Xin" (two volumes), Chengdu Sichuan People's Publishing House, 1983

=== Translations ===
- "Birds" (poetry), Rabindranath Tagore, India, 1929
- "The Prophet" (prose poem), by the Lebanese-American poet Jiha Gibran, Crescent Bookstore, September 1931
- "Collection of Indian Fairy Tales" (Collection of Fairy Tales), India's Mu Ra Annad, China Youth Publishing House, January 1955
- "Gitanjali" (Collection of Poems), Tagore, India, Beijing People's Literature Publishing House, 1955
- "Indian Folktales" (Collection of Stories), India's Mu Ra Annad, Children's Publishing House, 1955
- "Selected Poems of Rabindranath Tagore" (co-translation) (Collection of Poems), Rabindranath Tagore, India, Humanities Press, 1958
- "Collected Plays of Rabindranath Tagore" (Collection of Plays), Rabindranath Tagore, India, China Drama Publishing House, 1959
- "Copy of Mahendra's Poems" (Co-translation) (Collection of Poems), Mahend Writers Publishing House, Nepal, 1965
- "Lamp Burner" (Collected Poems), Anton Buttigieg, Malta, People's Literature Publishing House, 1981

=== Complete works ===
- Complete Works of Bing Xin (eight volumes), Fuzhou: Straits Literature and Art Publishing House, December 1994; (9 volumes) March 1999; (ten volumes) May 2012
- The Complete Works of Bing Xin, Volume 1 Literary Works 1919 -1923
- The Complete Works of Bing Xin Volume 2 Literary Works 1923-1941
- The Complete Works of Bing Xin Volume 3 Literary Works 1942-1957
- The Complete Works of Bing Xin Volume 4 Literary Works 1958-1961
- "The Complete Works of Bing Xin" Volume 5 Literary Works 1962-1979
- "The Complete Works of Bing Xin" Volume 6 Literary Works 1980-1986
- "The Complete Works of Bing Xin" Volume 7 Literary Works 1987-1997
- "The Complete Works of Bing Xin" Volume 8 Letters 1928-1997
- "The Complete Works of Bing Xin" Volume 9 Translations 1931-1961
- "The Complete Works of Bing Xin" Volume 10 Translations 1962-1980

== Honours ==
=== Foreign Orders and Medals ===
National Order of the Cedar (Lebanon, approved in March 1995, awarded at Beijing Hospital in 1997, now in the Bing Xin Literature Museum)

== Works available in English ==
- The Photograph. Beijing: Chinese Literature Press (1992)
- Spring Waters. Peking, (1929)
- The Little Orange Lamp (小橘灯, 1957), translated by Gong Shifen, Renditions, Autumn 1989, pp. 130–132.

== Portrait ==
- Bing Xin. A Portrait by Kong Kai Ming at Hong Kong Baptist University Library
