= Deng Weizhi =

Chinese politician

Deng Weizhi (born 1938) is a Standing Committee Member of the 9th CPPCC National Committee. He is also the Vice Chairman of the 10th Central Committee of the China Association for Promoting Democracy.

Mr. Deng is also a professor at the Department of Sociology, Shanghai University. He is the author of more than 20 books. His main research areas include: family study, urbanization, and social policy.
