= Dong Tichen =

Chinese anthropologist and educator

Dong Tichen or Ti-Chen Tung (Chinese: 董悌忱; 1931 – 2 September 1966) was a Chinese anthropologist and educator. He was a pioneer in physical anthropology in China.

He was educated in Fu Jen Catholic University (Beijing Normal University) in the 1940s, then attended Moscow State University in 1957. In the 1960s, He was invited to Fudan University by Wu Dingliang. Dong, Wu, and Liu Xian created the first department of physical anthropology at Fudan University in mainland China.

His research concentrated on paleoprimatology, dermatoglyphics, description of biological variation of ethnic minorities in China. He collected anthropometric measurements and described physical characteristics of living people in different parts of China. In 1962, he published "The Taxonomic Position of Gigantopithecus in Primates". In 1964, Dong published the paper "Study of dermatoglyphics of Zhuang nationality in Guangxi".

When the Cultural Revolution began in 1966, he was severely persecuted and died as a result.
