= Wu Qing (politician, born 1937) =

Chinese politician

- Born: 1937 (age 88–89); Beijing, China
- Occupations: Human rights activist, legislator and professor
- Parent(s): Wu Wenzao, Bing Xin

Wu Qing (Chinese: 吴青; born 9 November 1937) is a Chinese feminist activist, English language professor, and a seven-term district-level congress member. In this capacity she not only sought to uphold the rule of law as per the Chinese constitution, but also promoted women's rights in China, particularly in rural areas. She said, "China is still a Third World country. To change China, you've got to change the countryside. To do that, you've got to change the status of the women there. If you educate a woman, it's like educating a whole family, even several generations of the family. If you educate a man, you are only educating one person." She is actively involved in running a school for rural women sponsored by the Xie Lihua's Rural Woman magazine, educates and persuades women to stand for village elections. In China, she is considered a model person for the Chinese women and politicians.

In 2001, Wu won the Ramon Magsaysay Award for Public Service, which has been called "Asia's Nobel Prize"; she was the first Chinese woman to receive this honour. Her active role in women's welfare ensured that the Chinese women were represented at the 1995 UN Conference on Women held in Beijing.

Wu Qing continues to be involved with the Bing Xin Children's Literature Award (named after her mother). She was selected as a member of the jury for the Hans Christian Andersen Award 2016, being the Chinese jury member for the award. Together with her husband, she translated Beatrix Potter's Peter Rabbit books into Chinese.

== Biography ==
Wu was born in 1937 in China, the daughter of the famous female novelist Bing Xin and the pioneering sociologist Wu Wenzao. She received her primary education at Chongqing during the Second Sino-Japanese War in the early 1940s. While studying in the first grade her mother had encouraged her to raise funds for the soldiers wounded in the war. She was also told to share and be helpful to others. Her father was a sociologist who had founded the theory of sociology as relevant to China and encouraged students to do research in this field. After the war, he was posted as the Head of the Chinese diplomatic mission to Japan. Christianity also influenced her as she studied in the International School of Sacred Heart in Tokyo from 1949 to 1951. While still a student, on her return from Japan, the books which influenced her were: Serve the people heart and soul by Mao Zedong and the Russian novels such as Zoya, Shura and the Gadfly and many books on history and sociology. Premier Zhou Enlai was her father's friend and her role model, and he encouraged her to learn English as it provided a link to the outside world. As her family was democratic she was outspoken from a young age. She was the Communist Youth League secretary of her class. In 1957, her college education was at the Beijing Foreign Languages Institute (now known as Beijing Foreign Studies University). She was very bright in her studies and also got involved with tree-planting initiative in the hills and tile making as part of rural service, which first exposed her to rural life. After her studies, from 1960 she joined the institute as an English teacher.

Wu taught English and American studies for 40 years from 1960 to 2000 at the Beijing Foreign Languages Institute. Within the premises of this college she spends every Tuesday afternoon hearing the grievances of rural people to provide redress. From 1986 to 1995, as a teacher she has won many awards, notable of which are: Excellent Professor Award, Excellent Teacher Awards by the Municipality of Beijing, and Margaret Turner Award. She also hosted an English teaching programme on Chinese Television which was broadcast throughout the country. From 1986 to 1995, she was a member of Women's Studies Forum in the English Department of Beijing Foreign Studies University. From 1984, she worked for the Canadian International Development Agency as gender specialist.

Wu's advocacy is for ensuring the government's adherence to promises to people and not allowing misuse of power as she says: "I believe in the rule of law. I believe in transparency. I believe in democracy. I believe in supervision. But none of these exist in our Chinese culture. It's always been authoritarian. It's like in a family, [all it takes is to say] 'I'm your father!' and no one else dares say a word."

Wu was elected as People's Deputy in 1984 from the Haidian District People's Congress. Her mother Bing Xin was a former National People's Congress deputy. After Wu was elected as a district-level National People's Congress deputy, Bing Xin gave Wu a copy of the book 1982 "Constitution of the People's Republic of China." Since then, Wu began to use the powers granted by the Constitution to actively carry out rights protection activities.

Even as Deputy of the People's Congress, Wu was not afraid to say what she believed was right, when in 1988, she voted against the People's Congress for its Party policy. For this brazen opposition she was not permitted in 1989 by the Communist Party to get reelected for the People's Congress. But the will of the people of her constituency prevailed and she obtained 70 percent of the votes and got elected for a third term as People's Deputy. She attributes her boldness to address problems and face the government's lies to the fact that her mother imbibed in her this quality at a young age, and she says: "My mother told me at the beginning when I was very young, I'm a human being first and a woman second".

As of 2009, Wu had served as People's Deputy of the Congress for a seventh term as an elected member which records her 25 years of service in a legislative capacity. She served as the Deputy from 1984 to 2011. Because of her adherence to the constitution, a copy of which she carried with her all the time, she was known as "Deputy with the Constitution."

From 1988 to 2007, with support from peer deputies at the district level, Wu worked at the Beijing Municipal People's Congress, the city's parliament for four terms.

Though retired at the age of 72 (in 2009) Wu still continues to serve her people. She teaches at the Rural Women Training School at Changping, in Beijing (now known as Beijing Cultural Development Center for Rural Women), which was co-established for providing practical skills training for Rural Women. In this school she urged and advised women to take up business enterprises. The objective of her school is to make young women from rural areas literate, computer savvy, get basic legal knowledge, and also learn a trade for living.

Some of Wu's international assignments and achievements covered: Organizing the Fourth World Conference on Women during 1994–1995; as member of the board of the Beijing Cultural Development Center for Rural Women; member of the Global Fund for Women based in San Francisco; and Gender Action based in Washington D.C. She has chaired the Women's World Summit Foundation of Geneva; is chair of the Women Interchange Network of San Francisco, in an honorary capacity; and is represented on the United Nations Educational, Scientific, and Cultural Organization (UNESCO) as member of the jury to give International Award on Peace Education. She has also hosted an English teaching programme on Chinese Television which was broadcast throughout the country.

== Awards ==
As teacher, Wu has won many awards, notable of which are: Excellent Professor Award, Excellent Teacher Awards by the Municipality of Beijing and Margaret Turner Award. The Changping District Education Committee gave her the title of "Outstanding Individual of 2007", Chinese Senior Citizens' magazine named her the "Top Cover Personality", and the Schwab Foundation Network honoured her with an award as the World’s Outstanding Social Entrepreneurs of 2003.

== Bibliography ==
- Brill, Alida (1995). A Rising Public Voice: Women in Politics Worldwide. Feminist Press at CUNY. ISBN 978-1-55861-111-5.
- Nielsen, Gert Holmgaard (2014). Walking a Tightrope: Defending Human Rights in China. NIAS Press at NIAS (Nordic Institute of Asian Studies), Copenhagen. ISBN 978-87-7694-131-4.
