= Shangrao Normal University =

University in Shangrao, China

Shangrao Normal University (SNU, simplified Chinese: 上饶师范学院; traditional Chinese: 上饒師範學院; pinyin: Shàngráo Shīfànxuéyuàn) is a teacher's college in Shangrao, Jiangxi, China. It has an area of 983 mu or 65.5 hectares (162 acres).

== History ==
In 1958 the university was established as Shangrao Normal Junior College. The following year the name was changed to Gan Dong Bei University (simplified Chinese: 赣东北大学; traditional Chinese: 灨東北大學; pinyin: Gàn Dōngběi Dàxué; lit. 'Northeastern Jiangxi University'). The university closed during the Cultural Revolution and reopened in 1978. In March 2000 the name of the university changed to its current name after the Jiangxi provincial government and the Ministry of Education approved of the change.

== Demographics ==
As of 2014 has 14,405 full-time students and 1,561 adult education students. The full-time students originate from 30 provinces.

As of 2014 there are 979 employees, including faculty and staff, at Shangrao Normal University.
