= Socionature =

Socionature is the idea that nature and humanity are one and the same and can be thought of or referenced as a single concept. An example of this perspective would be the difference in experience two cultures might have with a drought. One culture might view drought as a form of natural variability in the environment and store surplus food for these times. Another culture might be engaged in profit farming and see the drought as a damaging natural crisis. The first culture would be an example of a socionature viewpoint.

== Definition and link to Marxist critique ==
In the Encyclopedia of Geography, Christopher Bear explained:

"Socionature is a concept that is used to argue that society and nature are inseparable and should not be analyzed in abstraction from each other. The concept is rooted in – but operates as a critique of – Marxist approaches such as historical materialism and post-structural approaches such as actor-network theory. Drawing on the former, it emphasizes temporality and processes of becoming, while its engagement with post-structural thought leads to a focus on ontological hybridity. At the heart of research on socionatures is an interest in processes of their production, and especially on the labour that is involved and the uneven power relationships that emerge."
