= Wu Wenzao =

Chinese sociologist, anthropologist, ethnologist

Wu Wenzao 吴文藻
- Born: 20 December 1901; Jiangyin, Jiangsu, Qing dynasty
- Died: 24 September 1985; Beijing, People's Republic of China
- Education: Columbia University
- Occupation: sociologist
- Spouse: Bing Xin
- Children: Wu Qing

Wu Wenzao was a Chinese sociologist, anthropologist, ethnologist.

== Biography ==
He was born in Jiangyin, Jiangsu. He was admitted into Tsinghua University at 1917. In 1923, his schoolmate Pan Guangdan (Quentin Kuang-tan Pan) persuaded him to go abroad to study at Dartmouth College after his graduation from Tsinghua. The classes in biology, chemistry, and the other natural sciences at Dartmouth greatly influenced him, and he later attempted to have his students use the scientific methods in their social studies. In 1925, he was admitted into Columbia University, and in 1928 he got his PhD in the Department of Sociology.

In 1929, he married Bing Xin, when they were studying in the United States. Together, he and Bing Xin visited different intellectual circles around the world, communicating with other intellectuals such as Virginia Woolf. In 1938 he founded the Department of Sociology of Yunnan University, after 1950 he served as a professor of Central College for Nationalities. Fei Xiaotong, Lin Yaohua, Huang Huajie, Qu Tongzu were his students. Wu greatly promoted localization of sociology and ethnology in China as a whole.

Wu Wenzao was one of the pioneers and the guide of Chinese ethnological anthropology. Since the early 1940s, he vigorously advocated the academic thought of Chinese ethnological anthropology. For more than half a century, Wu Wenzao's thought guided the development direction of Chinese ethnological anthropology.
