= Yenching University =

Private research university in China from 1919 to 1952

- 燕京大學
- Motto: 因真理 得自由 以服務
- Motto in English: Freedom Through Truth for Service
- Active: 1919–1952
- Location: Beijing, China; 39°59′30″N 116°18′14″E

Chinese name
- Simplified Chinese: 燕京大学
- Traditional Chinese: 燕京大學
Transcriptions
Standard Mandarin
- Hanyu Pinyin: Yānjīng Dàxué
- Bopomofo: ㄧㄢ ㄐㄧㄥ ㄉㄚˋ ㄒㄩㄝˊ
- Gwoyeu Romatzyh: Ianjing Dahshyue
- Wade–Giles: Yen^{1}-ching^{1} Ta^{4}-hsüeh^{2}
- IPA: [jɛ́n.tɕíŋ tâ.ɕɥě]
Yue: Cantonese
- Yale Romanization: Yingīng Daaihhohk or Yīngīng Daaihhohk
- Jyutping: Jin3ging1 Daai6hok6 or Jin1ging1 Daai6hok6

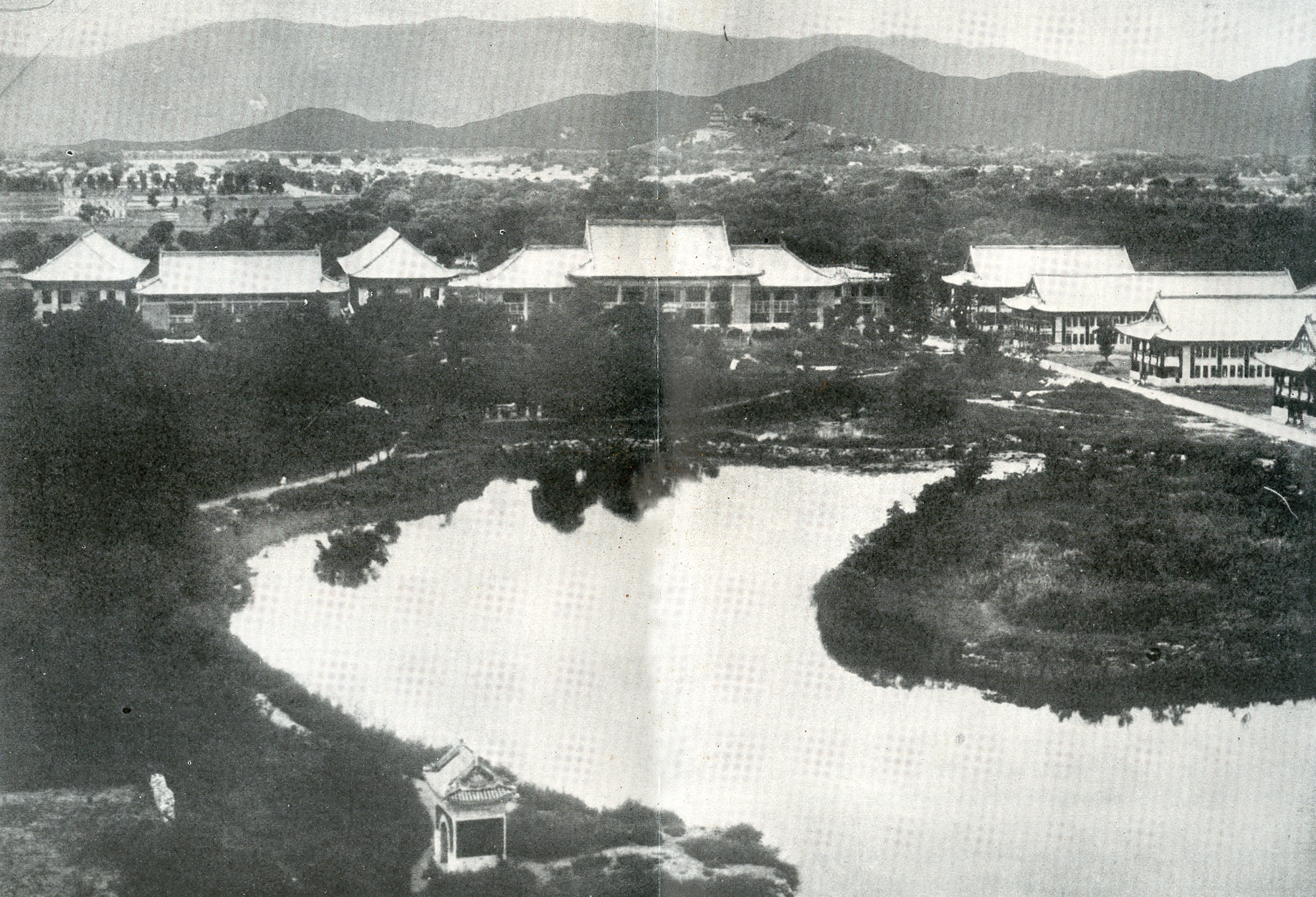
Yenching University campus

Yenching University (Chinese: 燕京大學; pinyin: Yānjīng Dàxué) was a private research university in Beijing, China, from 1919 to 1952.

The university was formed out of the merger of four Christian colleges between 1915 and 1920. The term "Yenching" comes from an alternative name for old Beijing, derived from its status as capital of the state of Yan, one of the seven Warring States that existed until the 3rd century BC.

== History ==
Yenching University was formed through the merger of four Christian schools over the course of five years, from 1915 to 1920:

- Hweiwen University (匯文大學), also known as the Methodist Peking University, founded in 1890 by the Methodist Episcopal Church. This should not be confused with the National Peking University founded eight years later in 1898. Huiwen's precursor (崇內懷理書院) was founded in 1870. Hiram Harrison Lowry was its principal.
- North China Union College in Tongzhou (通州協和大學). Its precursor (公理會潞河書院) was founded by the Congregational Church. Devello Z. Sheffield was the school's principal.
- North China Union Women's College (華北協和女子大學). Its precursor, Bridgman Academy (貝滿女塾), was founded in 1864 by Eliza J. Bridgman. It would be renamed the North China Union Women's College in 1907, with Luella Miner as its first president. When it joined Yenching University in 1920, it bore the name College of Arts and Sciences for Women of Peking University.
- The school of theology was itself a union of the theological seminary of North China Education Union and two Methodist theological schools in Beijing.

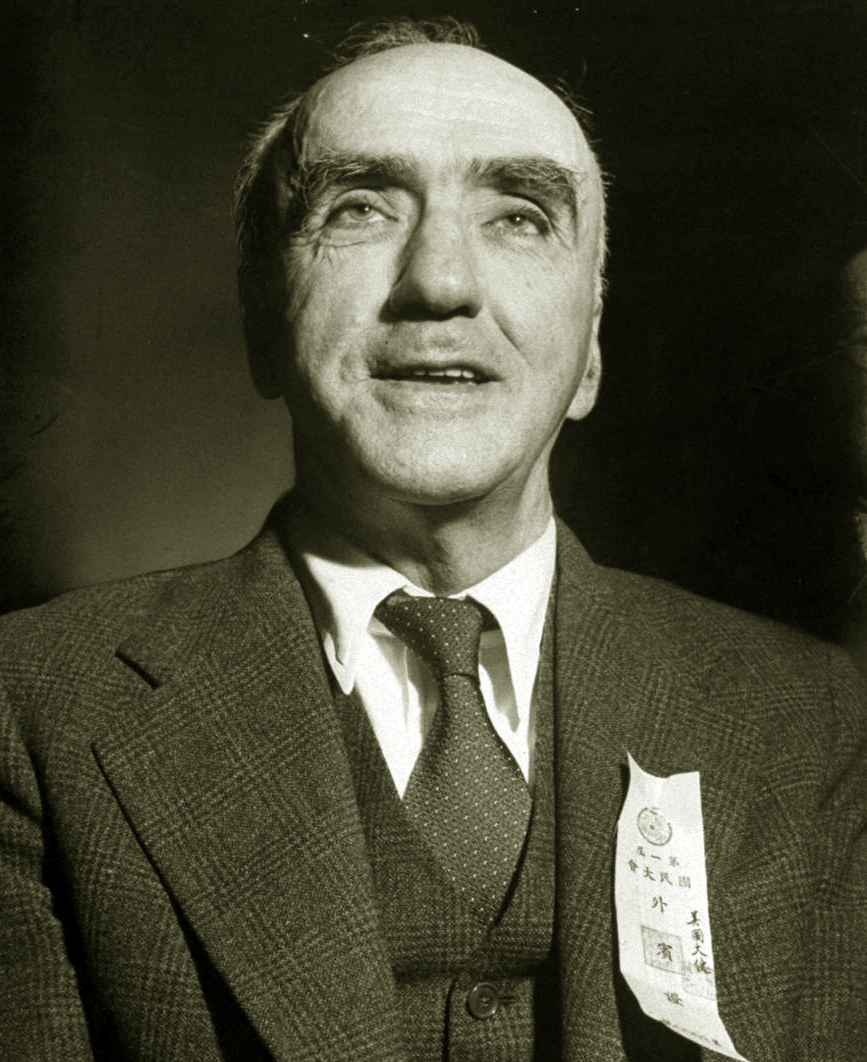
John Leighton Stuart, first principal of the university

John Leighton Stuart was appointed as the principal of the university in January 1919, prior to which he had been teaching Greek at the Jinling Theological Seminary (金陵神學院) in Nanjing. As the university was initially short on funds, he turned to fundraising worldwide and received support from the estate of Charles Martin Hall, an American executive of Alcoa Aluminum. The university bought the royal gardens of a Qing Dynasty prince to build a scenic campus and employed gardeners from the Imperial gardens. In 1926 the campus was completed. Theology, Law, and Medical were the main schools of the university, together with Arts and Science studies.

Stuart determined to create a university that served the Chinese nation. He attracted major Chinese and Western scholars to teach. Religion was not a qualification, although Stuart gave major support to the School of Theology. Among the first was William Hung, who became Chairman of the History Department and Dean. In 1928, the Harvard-Yenching Institute was jointly founded by Yenching University and Harvard University for the teaching of the humanities and social sciences in East Asia. Under Hung, the university's reputation for Chinese studies rose steadily, especially with the publication of the Harvard-Yenching Sinological Index Series. By 1930, the school was among the top universities in China, its teaching distinguished itself by a considerable academic freedom.

During the Second Sino-Japanese War, the area was occupied by Japan. Japanese military police (Kempeitai) sealed off the campus and also arrested its foreign faculty. The university was moved to Chengdu, Sichuan. After the People's Republic of China was established in 1949, Yenching University remained open.

In 1950, the School of Religion of Yanching University became independent as the Yanjing (Modern Pinyin spelling of Yanching) School of Religion, which was later renamed Yanjing Theological Seminary.

In response to the PRC's entry into the Korean War, the US froze all Chinese assets in America. The United States also prohibited transfers funds from the United States to recipients within the PRC, which cut off funding for American-influenced institutions in the PRC. The PRC began efforts to remove American cultural influence from China, including by nationalizing cultural institutions affiliated with the United States. In early 1951, Yenching University was nationalized and became administered by the Ministry of Education.

In 1952, Mao Zedong's government re-grouped the country's higher education institutions with individual institutions tending to specialize in a certain field of study after the Soviet model. As a result, Yenching University was closed up, and its arts and science faculties were merged into Peking University and other state-operated institutions, its politics and law faculties were merged into China University of Political Science and Law, its economics faculties were merged into Central University of Finance and Economics, its sociology faculties were merged into Minzu University of China, and other faculties merged into other institutions. At the same time, its engineering section was merged with Tsinghua University, and Peking University moved from central downtown Beijing to take over the former Yenching University campus in the city's Haidian District.

== Scholars ==
Among the scholars who taught at Yenching University were:

- Wu Leichuan (theology)
- William Hung (sinologist)
- Zhao Zichen (theology)
- Qian Mu (historian)
- Jian Bozan (historian)
- John Stewart Burgess (sociologist)
- Kenneth K.S. Chen (historian of Buddhism)
- Lu Zhiwei (theologian)
- Edgar Snow (journalism)
- Louis Rhys Oxley Bevan (Law)
- Luella Miner (dean of the women's college)
- Margaret Bailey Speer (dean of the women's college)
- Ava Milam Clark (home economics)

== Alumni ==
Prominent alumni include:

- Fei Xiaotong (anthropologist)
- Han Suyin (author)
- C.K. Yang (anthropologist)
- Bing Xin (Xie Wanying) writer
- Teng Ssu-yu (historian)
- Gong Peng (diplomat)
- Huang Hua (diplomat)
- James Shen (diplomat)
- Larry Wu-tai Chin (double-agent)

== See also ==
- History of Beijing
- Michael Lindsay, 2nd Baron Lindsay of Birker and Hsiao Li Lindsay, Baroness Lindsay of Birker
