= Fei Xiaotong =

Chinese anthropologist and political figure (1910–2005)

- 费孝通
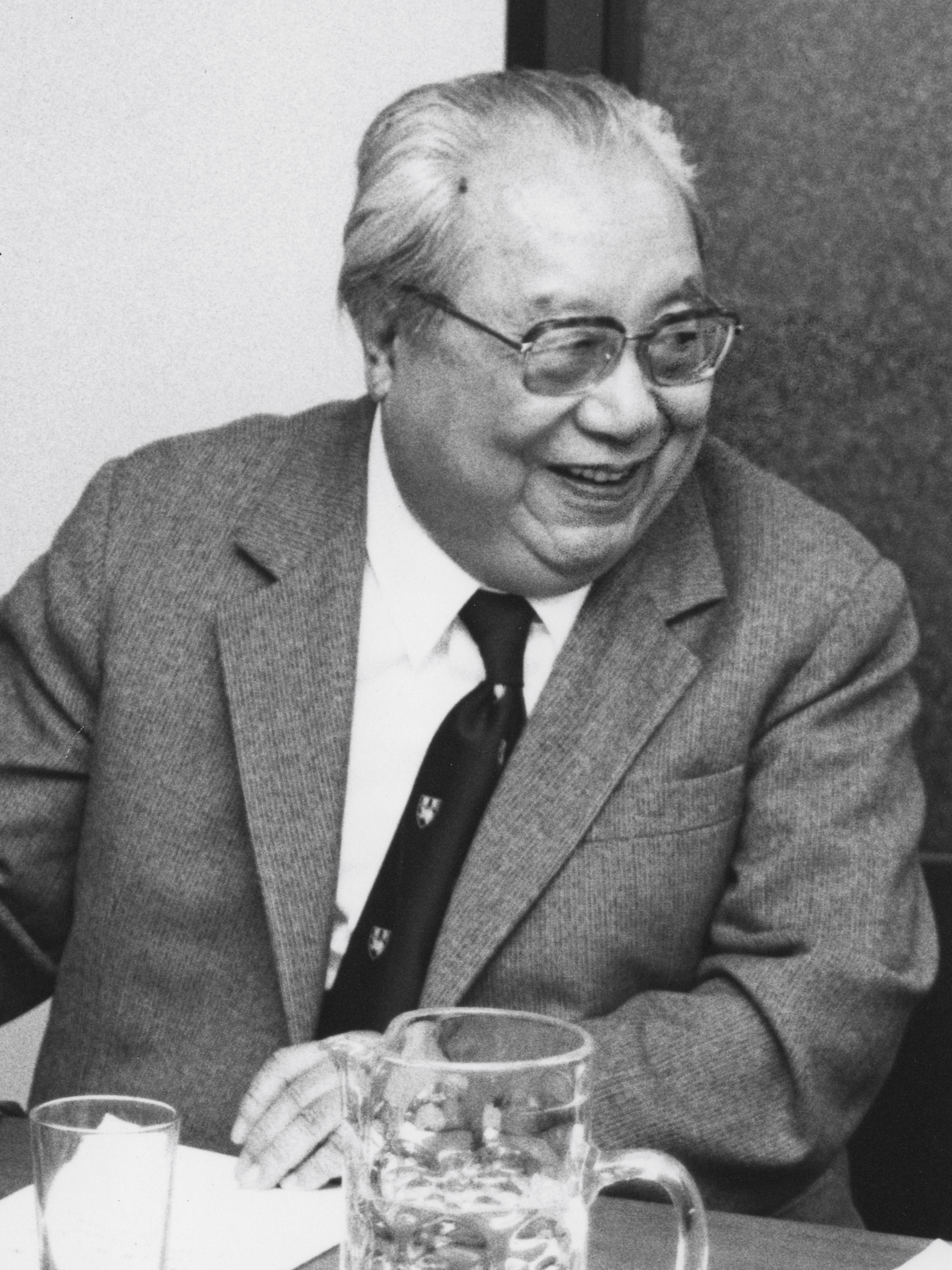
- Fei at the LSE in 1986.

Vice Chairman of the Standing Committee of the National People's Congress
- In office April 8, 1988 – March 16, 1998
- Chairman: Wan Li; Qiao Shi

Vice Chairman of the Chinese People's Political Consultative Conference
- In office June 17, 1983 – April 10, 1988
- Chairwoman: Deng Yingchao

Chairman of the China Democratic League
- In office January 1987 – November 1996
- Preceded by: Chu Tunan
- Succeeded by: Ding Shisun

Personal details
- Born: November 2, 1910 Wujiang, Suzhou, China
- Died: April 24, 2005 (aged 94) Beijing, China
- Party: China Democratic League
- Education: Yenching University (BS); Tsinghua University (MA); London School of Economics (PhD)
- Occupation: Anthropologist, sociologist
- Known for: The development of sociological and anthropological studies in China

Fei Xiaotong
- Traditional Chinese: 費孝通
- Simplified Chinese: 费孝通
Transcriptions
Standard Mandarin
- Hanyu Pinyin: Fèi Xiàotōng
- Wade–Giles: Fei Hsiao-t'ung

Fei Xiaotong or Fei Hsiao-tung (November 2, 1910 – April 24, 2005) was a Chinese anthropologist and sociologist. He was a pioneering researcher and professor of sociology and anthropology; he was also noted for his studies of China's ethnic groups as well as a social activist. Starting in the late 1930s, he and his colleagues established Chinese sociology and his works were instrumental in laying a foundation for the development of sociological and anthropological studies in China, as well as in introducing social and cultural phenomena of China to the international community. His last post before his death in 2005 was as Professor of Sociology at Peking University.

== Early years ==
Fei Xiaotong was born in Wujiang County of Suzhou on November 2, 1910. His world was one plagued with political corruption and abject poverty. He grew up in a gentry but yet not wealthy family. His father, Fei Pu'an (费朴安) was educated in the Chinese classics, earned a shengyuan civil service degree, studied in Japan, and founded a middle school. Fei's mother, Yang Renlan (杨纫兰), the Christian daughter of a government official and also highly educated for her time, established a nursery school in Wujiang which Fei attended. Her brothers include Chinese politician Yang Qianli (father of Hong Kong director and lyricwriter Evan Yang), Architect Yang Xiliu (S. J. Young), Chinese-American animator Cy Young, and entrepreneur Yang Xiren.

== Career in academic sociology ==
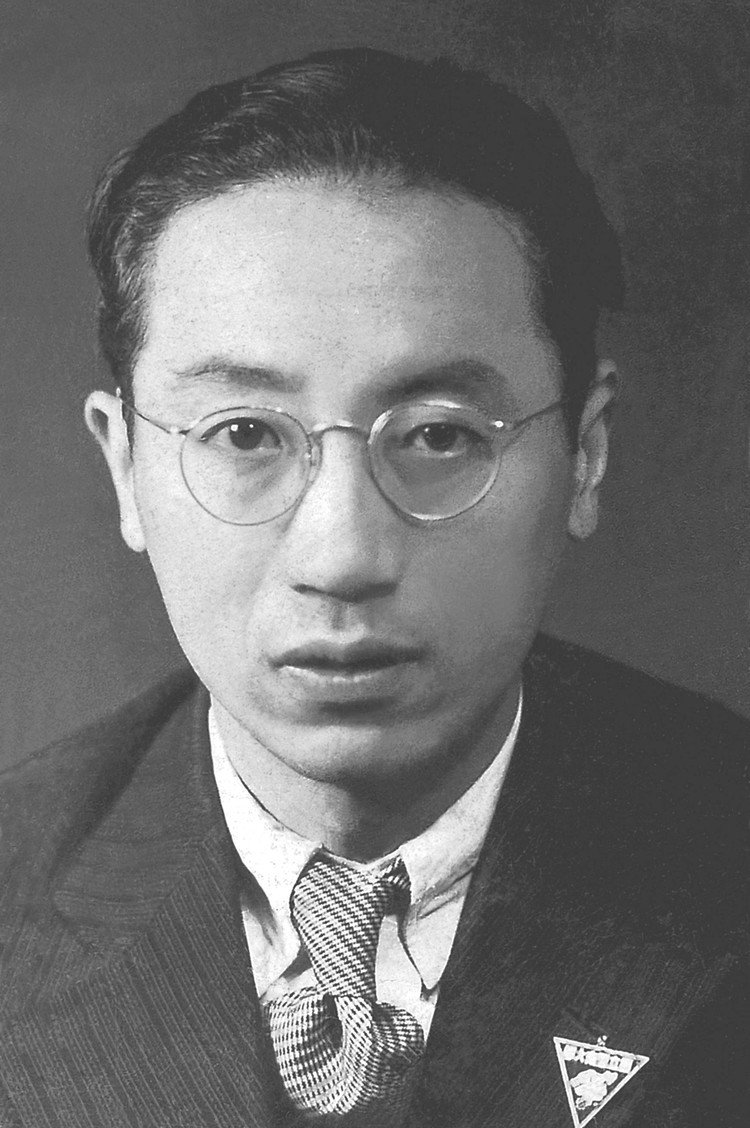
Fei Xiaotong in Yenching University

At missionary-founded Yenching University in Beiping, which had China's best sociology program, he was stimulated by the semester visit of Robert E. Park, the University of Chicago sociologist. For an M.A. in anthropology, Fei went to nearby Tsinghua University where he studied with Pan Guangdan and learned fieldwork methods from a White Russian émigré, S. M. Shirokogoroff. Fei's first fieldwork experience, in the rugged mountains of Guangxi province in the far south, ended tragically: Fei's leg was crushed by a tiger trap, and as his young and pregnant bride and research co-worker Wang Tonghui (王同惠) went to seek help, she fell into a pond and drowned.

=== "Functional" anthropology ===
From 1936 to 1938 Fei studied at the London School of Economics under the pioneer anthropologist Bronisław Malinowski. "From Malinowski and A.R. Radcliffe-Brown, Fei learned to focus on the functional interrelationships of various "parts" of a community and on the meaning of a culture as seen by its members. He devised survey methods which incorporated the functional approach ... " Fei wrote his 1938 PhD thesis, based on earlier fieldwork in Kaixiangong (Chinese:開弦弓) village, China and published it as Peasant Life in China (1939).

Among Fei Xiaotong's contributions to anthropology is the concept that Chinese social relations work through social networks of personal relations with the self at the center and decreasing closeness as one moves out. Among the criticisms of Fei Xiaotong's work is that his work tended to ignore regional and historical variations in Chinese behavior. Nonetheless, as a pioneer and educator, his intent was to highlight general trends, thus this simplification may have had significant justification for Fei's intent, even if they contributed to a bias in studies of Chinese society and culture.

In 1948, Fei published From the Soil, in which he discussed the agricultural basis for society in China. The text extensively used bucolic imagery.

An important work of the period, China's Gentry, was compiled from Fei's field interviews, and was published in the United States in 1953. It went on to become a staple of American university courses on China. The compilation and U.S. publication of China's Gentry grew out of a relationship Fei developed at Tsinghua University with the University of Chicago anthropologist Robert Redfield and his wife, Margaret Park Redfield.

In China, Fei sought to promote the discipline of sociology.

== Leading intellectual in People's Republic of China ==
=== 1950s and 1960s: Politics in command ===
After the establishment of the People's Republic of China in 1949, Fei played an important role in national intellectual and ideological life, and before long he began to hold a growing number of political positions. He was made vice president in 1951 of the Central Institute for Nationalities in Beijing (today, Minzu University of China), and in 1954 attended the First National People's Congress as a member of the Nationalities Affairs Commission. Fei was a key figure in the China Democratic League.

In 1950, Fei compared the governance of China to that of western democracies, writing

We have been familiar with the term 'democracy' for more than thirty years. What I found (in 1947) in America and England was something that looked like the real thing but was not. What I learned at the recent conference of people's representatives in Peking in six days exceeded all the knowledge that I had acquired on the subject in the previous six years. As soon as I set foot in the assembly hall I found a multitude of people in uniform, in working garb, in short dresses, in long gowns, in foreign-style clothes, in skull caps. This was the first time in my life I saw such a cosmopolitan crowd assembled together... These people did not come together as a result of elections held among the populace and formally they did not satisfy the conditions of democracy I had previously known. But could anybody like this be produced in Britain or the United States?... This was dictatorship, it is true. But only because of such a dictatorship were we able to have democracy in our conference hall. Understanding dawned on me. I realized now how democracy and dictatorship could be blended together.

— Quoted in New York Herald Tribune 13 May, 1950

Soon thereafter, however, departments of sociology were eliminated (as a "bourgeois pseudo-science"). Fei no longer taught, and published less and less. During the Hundred Flowers Campaign of 1956–57, he began to speak out again, cautiously suggesting the restoration of sociology. But then the climate suddenly changed with the Anti-Rightist Campaign. Public criticisms contended that Fei was a "big Rightist," a "poisonous weed," "anti-Party, anti-socialist," and "insidiously disgusting." He was spurned from academia. In response to these criticisms during the Anti-Rightist Campaign, Fei admitted what he characterized at the time as "crimes".

=== 1970s and 1980s: A 'second life' ===
In the 1970s, Fei, internationally known, began to receive foreign visitors, and after Mao's death he was asked to direct the restoration of Chinese sociology. He visited the United States again and was subsequently able to arrange the visits to China of American social scientists to help with the gigantic task of training a whole new cadre of Chinese sociologists. In 1980 he was formally rehabilitated, and was one of the judges in the long, televised trial of the Gang of Four and others held responsible for the crimes of the Cultural Revolution.

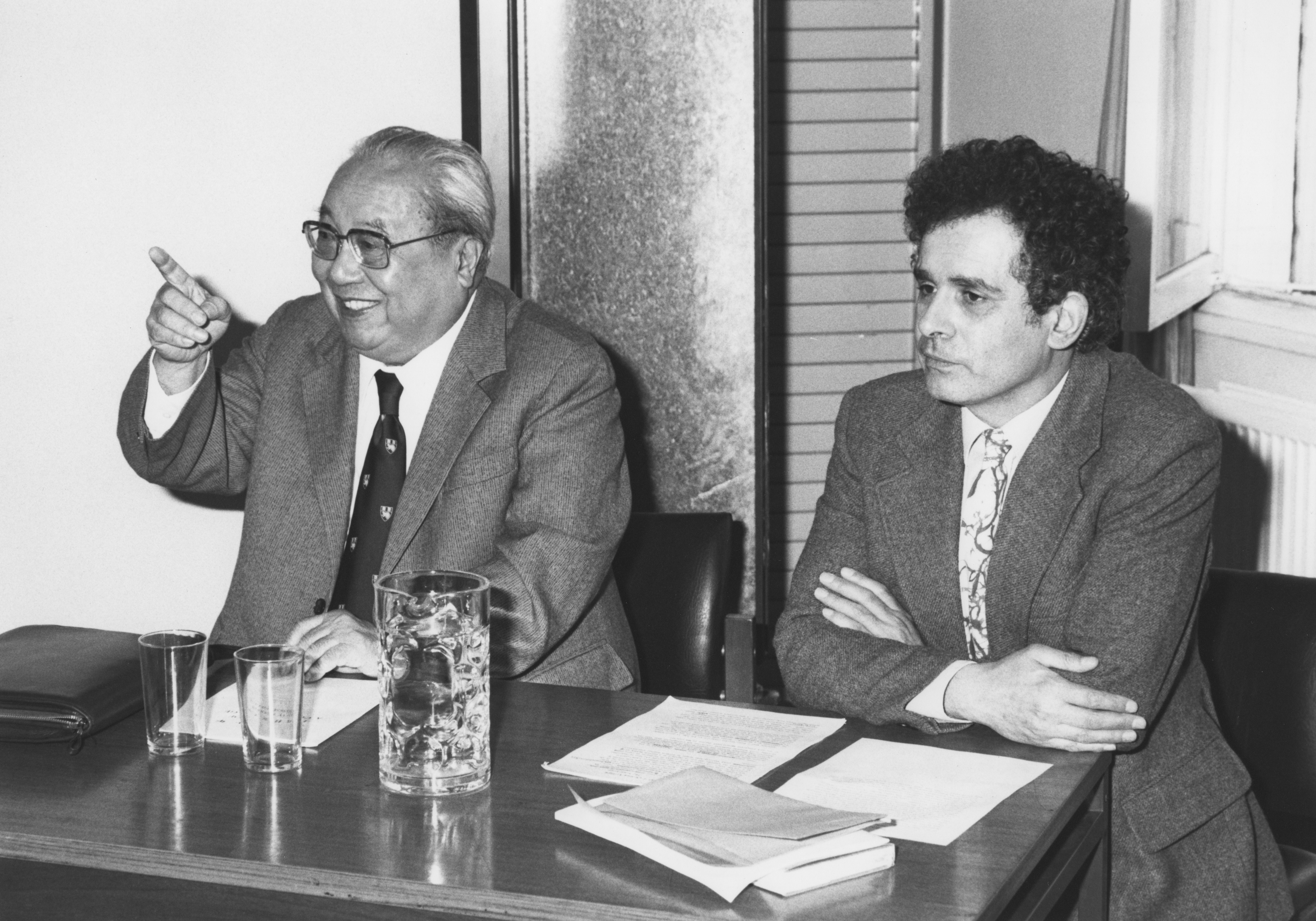
Fei Xiaotong and Professor Maurice Bloch, 1986

His 'second life' was more than ever that of the public intellectual, with important political posts and contact with policy makers. His influence is thought to have been important in convincing the government to promote rural industry, whose rapid growth in the 1980s raised the income of hundreds of millions of villagers all over China. Virtually every week in the 1990s his name was in the newspapers and his face on television. He traveled all over China, went abroad, to the US, Canada, Europe, Japan, Australia, and elsewhere, and was showered with international honors: the Malinowski Award of the Society for Applied Anthropology, the Huxley Memorial Medal of the Royal Anthropological Institute, an honorary doctorate from the University of Hong Kong, and other honors in Japan, the Philippines, Canada. He played a role in promoting and directing the reestablishment of sociology and anthropology in China, training scholars and developing teaching materials after thirty years of prohibition.

Fei is also known for his influential theory on ethnic groups in Chinese history, which follows the tradition of Lewis H. Morgan's stage-developmental evolutionism. A representative example of his work is Fei's 1988 Tanner lecture in Hong Kong, "Plurality and Unity in the Configuration of the Chinese Nationality." According to Fei, the Huaxia became a true ethnic group, the Han, during the Qin dynasty. Afterwards, the Han became "a nucleus with centripetal force" with their stable agricultural society attracting and assimilating ethnic nomads from China's northern frontier such as the Qiang.

=== The 1990s and 2000s: reminiscence and caution ===
Above all, it was as a writer that Fei flourished in his 'second life'. Virtually all of his old books were republished during these years, and he turned out new books and articles in even greater quantity. Of the fifteen volumes of his "Works" (1999–2001), new writings from the 1980s and 1990s fill over half. Many of the themes were familiar. He repeatedly and forcefully set forth the case for sociology and anthropology in China if modernization were to succeed. He reminisced about his village fieldwork, his studies, and his teachers. There were articles and books on rural industrialization, small towns, national minorities, and developing frontier areas. He championed the cause of intellectuals. He recounted what he had learned from his trips abroad and made some new translations from English. There was even a little book of his poetry. What is different in all this new writing is political caution; Fei had too much to do and too little time in the last decades to risk playing with fire again.

He was Professor of Sociology at Peking University at the time of his death on April 24, 2005, in Beijing at the age of 94. A memorial has been set up in the Department of Sociology at the university, where he has taught and directed since the 1980s.

== Career landmarks ==
=== Major works ===
- Peasant Life in China: A Field Study of Country Life in the Yangtze Valley. Preface by Bronislaw Malinowski. London: G. Routledge and New York: Dutton, 1939, and various reprints and a Japanese translation.
- Fei and Chang Chih-I [Zhang Zhiyi 张之毅], Earthbound China: A Study of Rural Economy in Yunnan. University of Chicago Press, 1945.
- China's Gentry: Essays in Rural-Urban Relations. Chicago: University of Chicago Press, 1953.
- Neidi de nongcun 《內地的農村》(Villages of the interior). Shanghai: Shenghuo, 1946.
- Shengyu zhidu 《生育制度》 (The institutions for reproduction). Shanghai: Shangwu, 1947.
- From the Soil (Xiangtu Zhongguo, 《鄉土中國》). Shanghai: Guancha, 1948. (Translated as From the Soil: The Foundations of Chinese Society, U. of California Press, 1992)
- Xiangtu chongjian 《鄉土重建》 (Rural recovery). Shanghai: Guancha, 1948.
- Fei Xiaotong et al. Small Towns in China: Functions, Problems & Prospects. Beijing: New World Press, 1986.
- Xingxing chong xingxing 《行行重行行》 (Travel, travel, and more travel). Ningxia Renmin Chubanshe, 1992.
- Fei Xiaotong wenji 《费孝通文集》 (Collected works of Fei Xiaotong), 15 vols. Beijing: Qunyan chubanshe, 1999.

=== Awards ===
- 1980: Bronislaw Malinowski Award of the International Applied Anthropology Association
- 1981: Huxley Memorial Medal of the Royal Anthropological Institute of Great Britain and Ireland
- 1988: Encyclopædia Britannica Prize in New York
- 1993: USA and Asian Cultural Prize in Fukuoka, Japan
- Doctor of Letters degree, honoris causa by the University of Hong Kong
- Doctor of Social Science degree, honoris causa, University of Macau
- 1994: Ramon Magsaysay Award for Community Leadership in the Philippines.

=== Political positions ===
Fei also made significant contributions to the study and management of the development of China's rural economy.

Before his death, Fei held a number of political positions, although these are mostly honorary; he was considered by many to be "active politically".

- Vice-president of the 6th Chinese People's Political Consultative Conference
- Vice-chairman of the 7th and 8th Standing Committee of the National People's Congress
- Vice-chairman of the Drafting Committee for the Basic Law of the Hong Kong Special Administrative Region of the People's Republic of China
- Honorary Chairman of the Central Committee of the China Democratic League, a minor party which is part of the United Front led by the Chinese Communist Party
- Deputy Director of the Experts Bureau of the State Council
- Deputy Director of the National Ethnic Affairs Committee
- Chairman of the Central Committee of the Democratic Union

== See also ==
- List of sociologists
- List of Chinese sociologists and anthropologists
- Francis L. K. Hsu

Party political offices
Preceded by Chu Tunan	Chairman of China Democratic League; 1987–1996	Succeeded by Ding Shisun
