= Sociology in Poland =

Polish field of study

Sociology in Poland has been developing, as has sociology throughout Europe, since the mid-19th century. Although, due to the Partitions of Poland, that country did not exist as an independent state in the 19th century or until the end of World War I, some Polish scholars published work clearly belonging to the field of sociology.

During the Interbellum, in the Second Polish Republic, sociology was popularized through the works of scholars such as Florian Znaniecki. Much of Polish sociology has been substantially influenced by Marxism (see "Marxist sociology"). A number of Jewish-Polish sociologists, including Zygmunt Bauman, were subjected to the 1968 antisemitic government campaign.

Contemporary Polish sociology is a vibrant social science with its own experts and currents of thought. Jan Stanisław Bystroń wrote in 1917 that Polish sociology is – as is any other national sociology – a notable and distinct field:

Is the term 'Polish sociology' justified, as science is universal and does not know state or national borders? ... Academics of a given nationality deal with some problems more often [than do those of other nationalities]. ... When we turn our attention to Polish sociological theories, one cannot fail to notice…that they were evoked by other needs and other problems that [produced] a different theoretical answer than in Western science.

== History ==
The history and theory of Polish sociology is a significant academic discipline in Poland, with most of its body of work only being published in the Polish language.

A biographical dictionary of Polish sociology was first published in 2001, and, though only dealing with scholars with surnames between A and H who had died, includes a list of 213 sociologists.

=== Early history ===
Early Polish sociological thought would reflect that of the three founding fathers: Auguste Comte (positivism), Karl Marx, and Émile Durkheim. Prominent among the first Polish sociologists were Ludwik Gumplowicz, Leon Petrażycki, Edward Abramowski, and Kazimierz Kelles-Krauz. In 1860, economist Józef Supiński would write and publish the first Polish sociological text, titled Myśl ogólna fizjologii powszechnej (General Thought on Universal Physiology).

Sociology in Poland developed significantly during the interbellum period, emerging from its niche into a respectable, mainstream science. Chairs in sociology would be created in Poland around the 1920s (including Poznań in 1920; Warsaw, 1923; and Kraków, 1930). The first chair would be founded by Florian Znaniecki, the most notable Polish sociologist during this period, whose influence would also turn the University of Poznań into a major sociological centre in Poland.

Other Polish notable sociologists of the early 20th century include Ludwik Krzywicki, Jan Stanisław Bystroń, and Stefan Czarnowski, as well as Bronisław Malinowski, both a sociologist and anthropologist, who would gain international fame during this period. The first specialized research institutes created in Poland were the Institute of Social Economy in Warsaw (1920), headed by Krzywicki, and the Institute of Sociology in Poznan (1921), headed by Znaniecki. The first sociological journals were also published in this period.

=== World War II and Communist Poland ===
World War II interrupted the development of Polish science, as both Nazi Germany and the Soviet Union occupied Poland, closing down Polish educational and research institutions, as well as persecuting Polish intelligentsia, including social scientists. In the early years of communist Poland (1948–1956, i.e. the Stalinist period), sociology would be banned by authorities as "bourgeois pseudoscience".

Polish sociology was, however, revived following the Gomułka's Thaw in 1956, with the foundation of the Polish Sociological Association and with Warsaw and Łódź becoming major centers for sociological studies. Later on, Polish sociology (as all other social sciences in the Eastern Bloc) would have to deal with Marxist influence and political interference. Due to these developments, Marxist thought was over-represented, and studies were censored or not allowed. For example, to prevent scholars from openly advocating ideas that might have undermined the communist government, research was restricted into political organization of society.

This would also lead to the circulation of underground, illegal publications (e.g. Bibuła). The notable names of the early postwar period include Stanisław Ossowski his wife, Maria Ossowska, Julian Hochfeld, Józef Chałasiński, and Andrzej Malewski. Zygmunt Bauman would flee the University of Warsaw to work at the University of Leeds in the United Kingdom.

=== Western influence ===
Throughout its history, even during the times of partition and under the communist regime, Polish sociology has been influenced by developments in Western sociological theory.

Some Poles can be found among the International Sociological Association, including Jan Szczepański who would be president from 1966 to 1970; Stanisław Ossowski, vice-president (1959–1962); and Magdalena Sokołowska, vice-president (1978–1982). The Polish Sociological Association has also been relatively independent. Even under the communist regime, the freedom of Polish academics seemed to have been greater than in other communist countries, and thus Polish academics often spread Western ideas among their colleagues in the East and South.

== Concepts and trends ==
=== War and post-war ===
During the interbellum period, Polish sociology was most closely related to the neopositivist perspective. During the communist period, in addition to unavoidable stress on the Marxist approach, Polish sociologists also pursued Znaniecki's humanistic sociology among other approaches.

Following the fall of communism, the Marxist approach became quickly marginalized, resulting in the closure of two major research institutions that advocated the Marxist approach to sociology: the Institute for Basic Problems of Marxism-Leninism and the Academy for Social Sciences. Marxist themes remain present in Polish sociology, however they are not dominant.

=== 1990s onward ===
Although no single theory or ideology has replaced the marxist influence, many Polish sociologists are adherents of theoretical liberalism. There is also a trend of a retreat from "theory as such" and from the general methodology of the social sciences. Studies into methodology of empirical research, both qualitative and quantitative, are popular. Since 2000 the methodology of qualitative research becomes very popular in Poland. Many publications appeared and the specialized in qualitative methodology journal has been created. http://www.qualitativesociologyreview.org/ENG/index_eng.php

Since 1990, common themes among Polish sociologists include:

- Socioeconomic transformation within Poland (i.e. from communist to capitalist), with focus on issues such as privatization, private entrepreneurship, rise of new social classes, poverty, unemployment, and corruption.
- Changes of political life in Poland, such as the evolution of new political parties, elections, public sphere, etc.
- Gender research;
- Religiosity
- Ethnic groups.

The number of sociological books on the market has grown rapidly since 1989, with publishing houses specializing in sociology. Polish sociologists and their institutions have also increased participation in various international organizations and research programs. By the end of the 1990s, altogether, about 11,000 people majored in sociology on the BA and MA levels in both public and private schools. Moreover, all major Polish universities offer degrees in sociology.

== Journals ==
Journals published by the Polish Academy of Sciences (PAN)
Original title	Translated title	PAN department
Archiwum Historii Filozofii i Myśli Społecznej	Archives of the History of Philosophy and of Social Thought	Institute of Philosophy and Sociology
ASK: Społeczeństwo, Badania, Metody	ASK: Society, Research, Methods	Institute of Philosophy and Sociology
Sisyphus: Sociological Studies JSTOR 522790		Institute of Philosophy and Sociology
Kultura i Społeczeństwo	Culture and Society	Institute of Political Science; Committee on Sociology
LUD	PEOPLE	Committee on Ethnology; Polish Ethnographic Society
Studia Socjologiczne	Sociological Studies	Institute of Philosophy and Sociology; Committee on Sociology
Roczniki Socjologii Morskiej	Annals of Marine Sociology	Gdańsk

Other journals
Original title	Translated title	Publisher
Polish Sociological Review (formerly The Polish Sociological Bulletin)		Polish Sociological Association
Przegląd Socjologii Jakościowej (also QSR international edition)	Qualitative Sociology Review	Sociology of Organization & Management Dept., University of Łódź
Przegląd Socjologiczny	Sociological Review	Łódzki Ośrodek Socjologiczny
Roczniki Socjologii Rodziny	Annals of Family Sociology	Adam Mickiewicz University Press
Ruch Prawniczy, Ekonomiczny i Socjologiczny	The Juridical, Economic and Sociological Movement	Adam Mickiewicz University; Poznan University of Economics

== See also ==
- History of philosophy in Poland
- History of sociology
- Polish Sociological Association
- Polish sociologists
