= Catherine Kerr =

Catherine Kerr may refer to:

- Catherine Kerr (environmentalist) (1911–2010), pioneer in environmentalism
- Catherine Kerr (neuroscientist) (1964-2016)
- Catherine Kerr (athlete) (1921–2014), athlete from Manitoba, Canada

== See also ==
- Katharine Kerr (born 1944), American science fiction and fantasy novelist
