= Jolanta Żyndul =

Polish historian

Jolanta Maria Żyndul (born 1964) is a Polish historian, a specialist on modern Jewish history and Polish-Jewish relations in 19th and 20th century.

== Life ==
She joined the historical faculty of the John Paul II University of Lublin, but later moved to Warsaw, where she graduated in 1990 from the Faculty of History of University of Warsaw. Since 1991 she works for the university's Mordechaj Anielewicz Centre for the Study and Teaching of the History and Culture of Jews in Poland, initially as a technical assistant, then assistant professor (1992–1999) and since 1999 as an adjunkt. When Jerzy Tomaszewski retired in 2001, she replaced him as director of that institution.

In 1999 she received a doctoral degree (under tutelage of prof. Marcin Kula), and in January 2013 she received habilitation.

She also works as a chief specialist at the POLIN Museum of the History of Polish Jews and teaches as a visiting scholar at the Jagiellonian University.

Her 2011 book Kłamstwo krwi (The Blood Libel) is a monograph on the perseverance of the belief that Jews sacrifice humans as part of their religion. It received favourable reviews.

In 2000 she received the KLIO award for her monograph Państwo w państwie? on the national and cultural autonomy in Central-Eastern Europe in the 20th century. In 2007 she was awarded with the Warsaw Ghetto Uprising commemorative medal.

== Notable publications ==
- Zajścia antyżydowskie w Polsce w latach 1935-1937, Warsaw 1994.
- Apolinary Hartglas. Na pograniczu dwóch światów, ed. J. Żyndul, Warsaw 1996.
- Państwo w państwie? Autonomia narodowo-kulturalna w Europie Środkowowschodniej w XX wieku, Warsaw 2000.
- Kłamstwo krwi. Legenda mordu rytualnego na ziemiach polskich w XIX i XX wieku, Warsaw 2011.
