= Barbara Szacka =

Polish sociologist (1930–2025)

- Born: 20 April 1930; Kalisz
- Died: 17 January 2025
- Occupation: Sociologist

Academic background
- Education: University of Warsaw
- Doctoral advisor: Nina Assorodobraj-Kula

Barbara Szacka (20 April 1930 – 17 January 2025) was a sociologist.

== Biography ==
The daughter of physicians: Wojciech Plewniak and Zofia née Chmielińska. Her father died in Katyń. She was raised by her mother, who was a dentist.

In 1952 she graduated in sociology from the University of Warsaw. In 1962 she obtained doctorate upon dissertation Teoria społeczna i społeczna utopia. Analiza poglądów Stanisława Staszica supervised by Nina Assorodobraj-Kula.

Her research interests included collective memory, the biological foundations of social life and general sociology.

She was a member of the Polish Sociological Association. She supervised two doctoral dissertations. She was married to Jerzy Szacki. She was a feminist.

== Works ==
- Stanisław Staszic: portret mieszczanina. Warszawa. 1962.
- Stanisław Staszic. Warszawa. 1966.
- Przeszłość w świadomości inteligencji polskiej. Warszawa. 1983.
- Czas przeszły i pamięć społeczna. Warszawa. 1990. Co-authored with Anna Sawisz.
- Wprowadzenie do socjologii. Warszawa. 2003. 2008.
- Czas przeszły, pamięć, mit. Warszawa. 2006.
- Między codziennością a wielką historią. Druga wojna światowa w pamięci zbiorowej społeczeństwa polskiego. Warszawa. 2010. Co-authored with Piotr T. Kwiatkowski, Lech M. Nijakowski, Andrzej Szpociński.
- Życie i pamięć w mrocznych czasach. 2024. Memories.

=== Editions ===
- Polska dziecięca. Warszawa. 1987. 2005.
- Człowiek, zwierzę społeczne. Czytelnik. 1991. Translated and edited with Krzysztof Najder and Jakub Szacki.
