= Beata Szydło =

Prime Minister of Poland from 2015 to 2017

Her Excellency Beata Szydło MEP
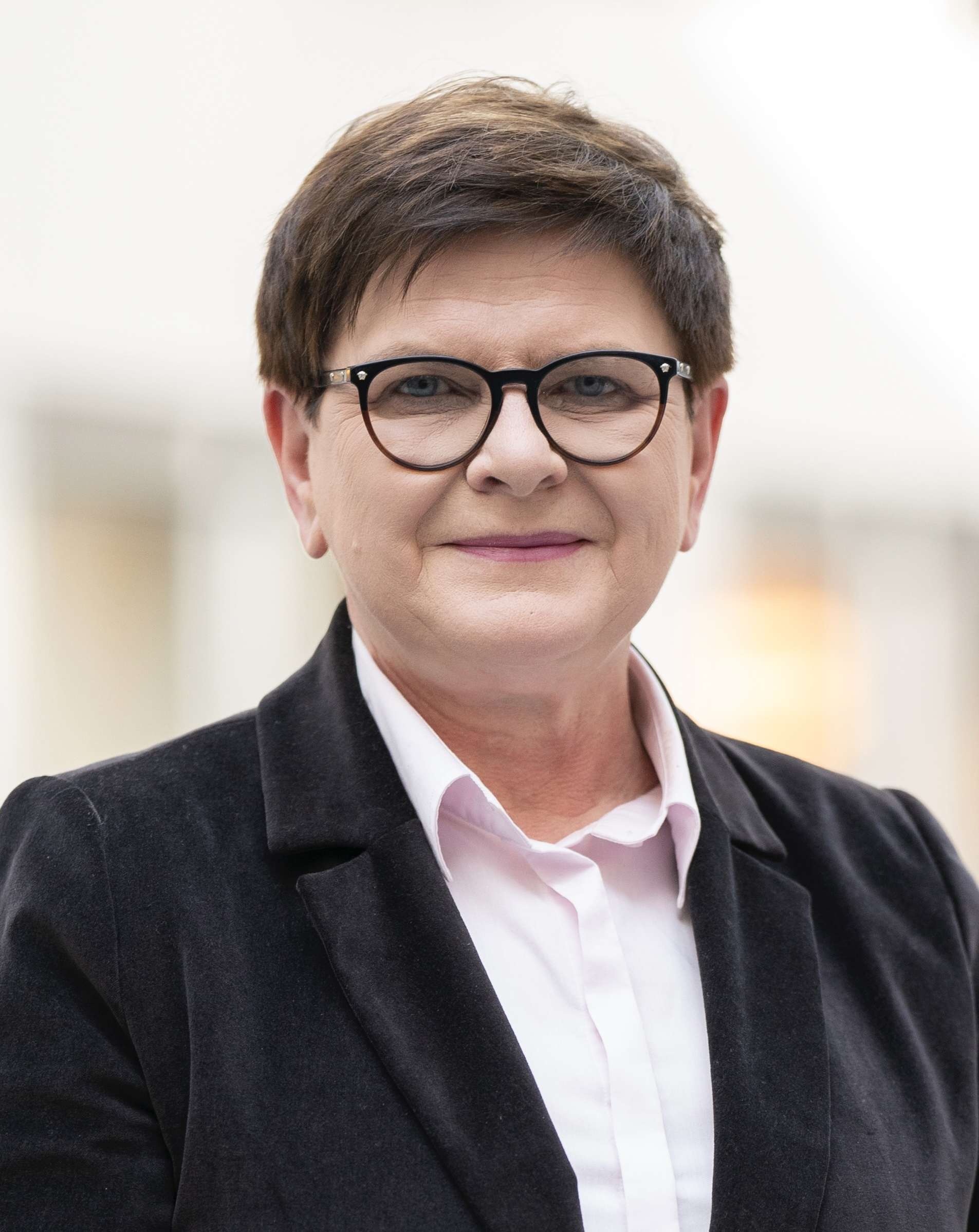
- Official portrait, 2024

Prime Minister of Poland
- In office 16 November 2015 – 11 December 2017
- President: Andrzej Duda
- Deputy: Mateusz Morawiecki; Piotr Gliński; Jarosław Gowin
- Preceded by: Ewa Kopacz
- Succeeded by: Mateusz Morawiecki

Deputy Prime Minister of Poland
- In office 11 December 2017 – 4 June 2019 Serving with Piotr Gliński, Jarosław Gowin
- Prime Minister: Mateusz Morawiecki
- Preceded by: Mateusz Morawiecki
- Succeeded by: Jacek Sasin

Member of the European Parliament
- Incumbent
- Assumed office 2 July 2019
- Preceded by: Edward Czesak
- Constituency: Lesser Poland and Świętokrzyskie

Chairman of the Social Committee of the Council of Ministers
- In office 11 December 2017 – 4 June 2019
- Prime Minister: Mateusz Morawiecki
- Deputy: Rafał Bochenek
- Preceded by: Office established
- Succeeded by: Piotr Gliński

Member of the Sejm
- In office 25 September 2005 – 4 June 2019
- Preceded by: Janusz Kozik
- Succeeded by: Krzysztof Kozik
- Constituency: 12 – Chrzanów

Personal details
- Born: Beata Maria Kusińska; 15 April 1963 (age 63) Oświęcim, Poland
- Party: Law and Justice
- Spouse: Edward Szydło
- Children: 2
- Education: Jagiellonian University
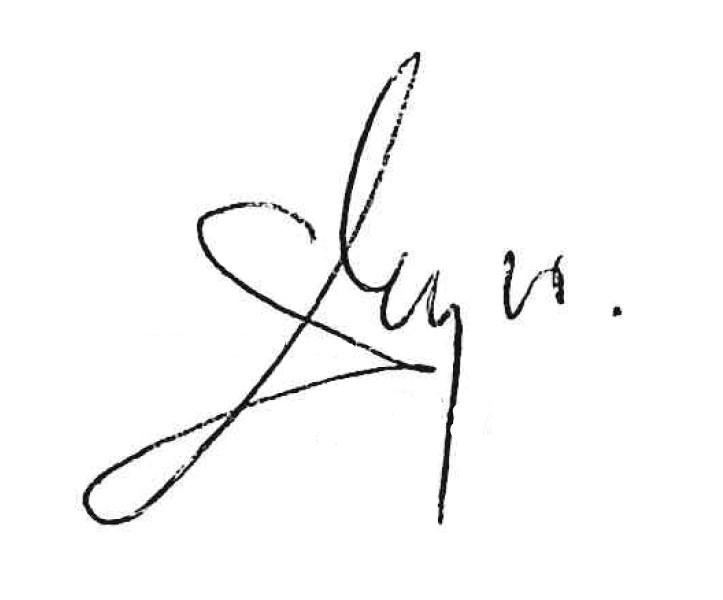
- Signature
- Website: Official website

Beata Maria Szydło (Note: Polish pronunciation: [bɛˈata ˈmarja ˈʂɨdwɔ]) (née Kusińska; (Note: Polish pronunciation: [kuˈɕij̃ska]) born 15 April 1963) is a Polish politician who has served as a Member of the European Parliament (MEP) since 2019. A member of Law and Justice (PiS), she previously served as the prime minister of Poland from 2015 to 2017. Szydło became the third woman to hold the office, after Hanna Suchocka and her immediate predecessor Ewa Kopacz. She currently is a vice-chair of the European Conservatives and Reformists (ECR) group in the European Parliament. She is considered to have been a de jure leader of Poland, with the de facto leader being Jarosław Kaczyński, the leader of the party Szydło is a member of.

She successfully led the presidential campaign of Andrzej Duda, Law and Justice's nominee for President of Poland, to victory. In June 2015, Szydło won internal endorsement to be her party's candidate for prime minister at the forthcoming parliamentary election. On 25 October, Law and Justice went on to win majority government for the first time in the country's history; Szydło was duly appointed Prime Minister on 16 November by President Duda.

She was a vocal critic of numerous European Union policies, particularly on immigration, and robustly defended her government from criticism by other EU leaders. During her time in office, she was ranked 31st in Forbes magazine's ranking of the world's 100 most powerful women and the 10th among the most influential female political leaders. In December 2017, she was forced to resign as prime minister after Jarosław Kaczyński, the Chairman of Law and Justice, withdrew confidence from her to continue as the party's lead election candidate within the Sejm. Her resignation was accepted by President Duda, who at the same time designated her deputy, Mateusz Morawiecki to be the new prime minister. Morawiecki took office three days later, and immediately appointed Szydło his Deputy Prime Minister.

Szydło stood for the European Parliament at the 2019 European Parliament elections, and was elected to represent the constituency of Lesser Poland and Świętokrzyskie; she received the highest number of individual votes of any candidate historically in Poland. She subsequently resigned as deputy prime minister.

== Early years and education ==
Szydło was born in Oświęcim and raised near Brzeszcze, where her father was a miner. She graduated from Jagiellonian University in Kraków in 1989 where she completed studies at the Department of Ethnography. Between 1989 and 1995, she was a PhD student at the Philosophy and History Faculty of that university. In 1997, Szydło completed post-graduate studies for managers of culture at Warsaw School of Economics, whereas in 2001 at Kraków University of Economics - management of local government in the European Union.

== Early political career ==
Szydło was elected Mayor of Gmina Brzeszcze at the age of 35, holding this position for seven years. During her campaign, along with locals she helped renovate the school in a small town of Pcim, which lost its roof in a storm. In 2004, she participated in International Visitor Leadership Program. In September 2005, she was elected to the Sejm, the lower house of the Parliament of the Republic of Poland receiving 14,499 votes in 12 Chrzanów district, as a candidate of the conservative Law and Justice party. She was elected member of the 5th, 6th, 7th and 8th Parliament of the Republic of Poland. Szydło was appointed vice-chairman of the Law and Justice Party on 24 July 2010, after which she succeeded Stanisław Kostrzewski as the treasurer of the Law and Justice party in September 2014.

Following her successful leadership of Andrzej Duda's presidential campaign, at the Law and Justice party convention on 20 June 2015 Szydło was named as Law and Justice's candidate for prime minister in the Polish parliamentary election. She was widely seen as being more moderate than Law and Justice chairman Jarosław Kaczyński.

At the October 2015 election, Law and Justice won a decisive victory, becoming the first Polish party to win an outright majority since the end of Communism. Szydło was sworn in as prime minister on 16 November 2015.

== Prime Minister of Poland (2015–2017) ==
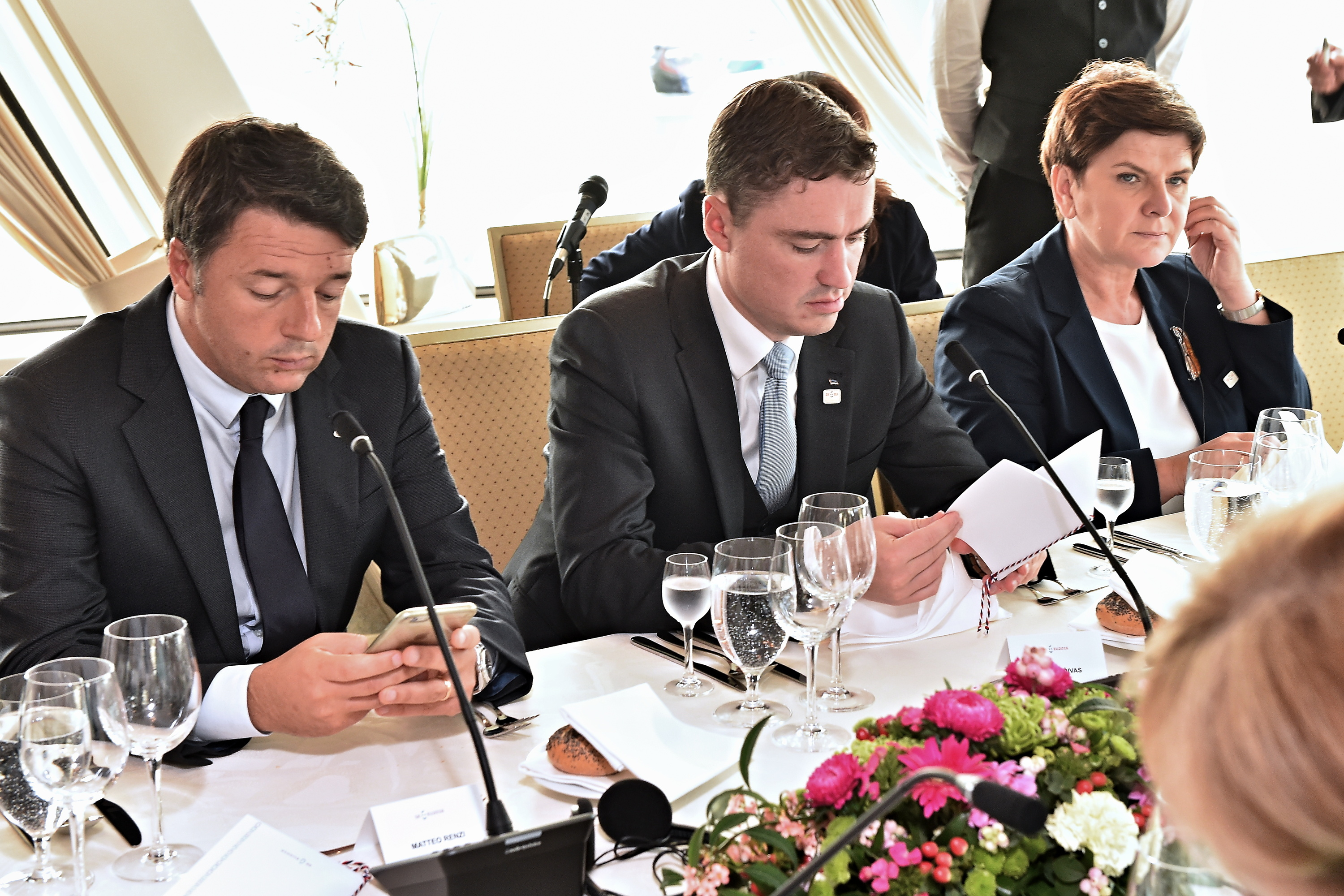
Szydło with Italian Prime Minister Matteo Renzi and Estonian Prime Minister Taavi Rõivas during the Bratislava Summit, 2016

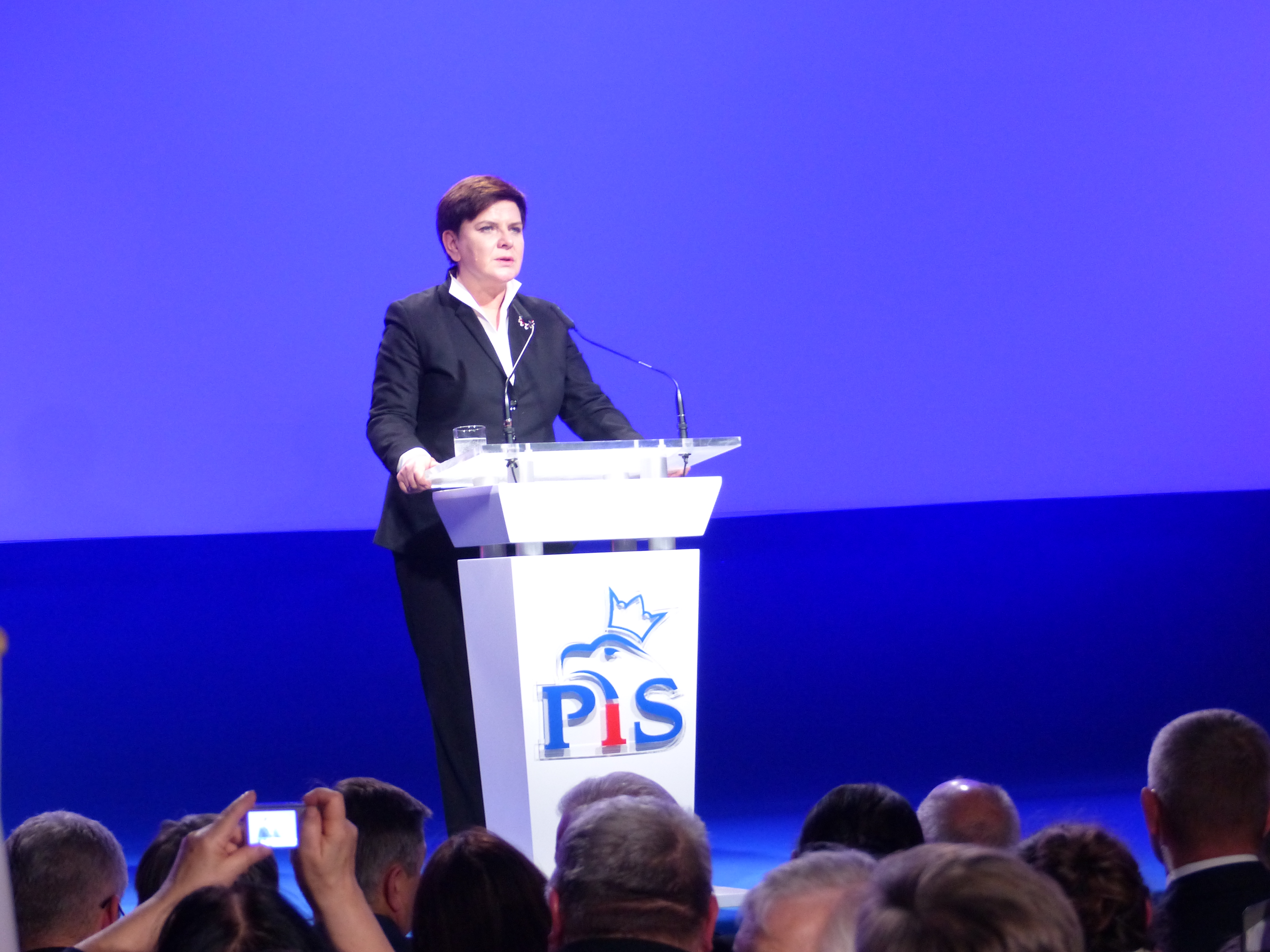
Beata Szydło speaking on National Independence Day in Kraków, 2016

On 18 October 2015 she made her keynote address (Exposé), further receiving 236 votes in favour of her government. One of her first decisions was to remove the European Union flag from press conferences at the Chancellery of the Prime Minister and to replace the clock in the meeting hall of the Council of Ministers with a Cross. In meetings with voters, she promised to reduce the retirement age and raise the minimum wage. She declared introducing the 500+ programme will be her priority as prime minister. The programme was introduced on 1 April 2016, supplying families with 500PLN for every child, starting from the second child. It is intended to serve as a demographic stimulus, and enhance population growth. The program was shown to reduce child poverty from 9% to 4.7% and have moderate positive impacts on fertility.

One of the biggest controversies during her administration, the Polish Constitutional Court crisis, 2015 was officially criticized by the European Parliament, which, on 13 April 2016, passed a resolution declaring that the Parliament "is seriously concerned that the effective paralysis of the Constitutional Tribunal in Poland endangers democracy, human rights and the rule of law".

In May 2017, Szyldo backed away from a deal to accept 7,000 refugees after a terrorist attack in Brussels. Stating within the migrant ranks "there are also terrorists. She joined Austria and Hungary in refusing to participate in the EU brokered deal.

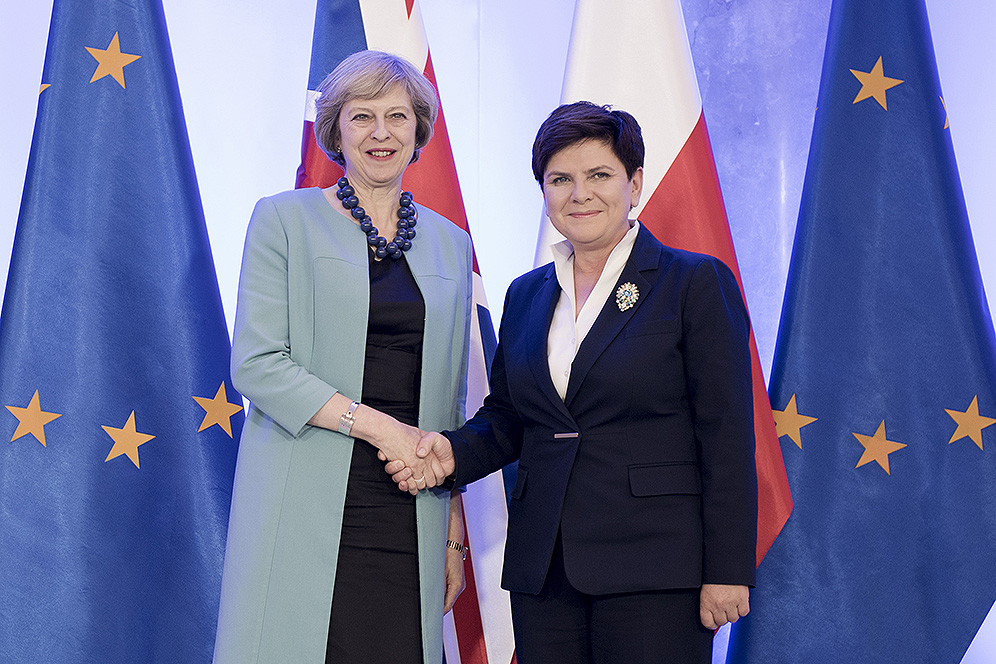
Szydło with British Prime Minister Theresa May in Warsaw, 28 July 2016

Szydło's government was strongly opposed to the UK's effort to stop EU immigrants claiming in-work benefits for four years if they moved to Britain. Increasing the support for Brexit, Szydło offered support in return for a permanent base of NATO troops on Polish territory. She resigned from office along with all members of her cabinet on 7 December 2017. The next day, her resignation was accepted by the President Andrzej Duda, who at the same time designated Finance Minister and Deputy Prime Minister Mateusz Morawiecki as the new prime minister.

== Later career ==
Szydło was appointed Deputy Prime Minister of Poland by her former deputy, Mateusz Morawiecki, several days after her resignation as prime minister.

Szydło later stood for the European Parliament at the 2019 European Parliament elections, and was elected to represent the constituency of Lesser Poland and Świętokrzyskie. In that election, she received the highest number of individual votes of any European Parliamentary candidate in Poland's history. She resigned as deputy prime minister on 4 June in order to take her seat in the European Parliament.

In April 2024, she criticized the European Green Deal, saying, "People can’t pay their bills, people see no future, because of the Green Deal, and we will see this in the elections. The green ideology, which you’ve tried to ram down the throats of Europeans, doesn’t give Europe a future."

== Personal life ==
Szydło is married to Edward Szydło. The couple has two sons: Tymoteusz (born 1992), a Catholic priest (he has since left priesthood), and Błażej (1994). She is a devout Catholic and declares her adherence to conservative Christian values.

=== Security incidents ===
On 21 November 2016, Szydło's vehicle was involved in a five-vehicle crash in Israel which included a police car and ambulance. She was in Israel for the government to government talks and to meet with Prime Minister Benjamin Netanyahu. Just a few months later, on 10 February 2017, Szydło and two security officials were injured in a car crash in her hometown, Oświęcim. Her Audi limousine swerved and hit a tree to avoid a small Fiat whose driver was later charged with involuntary violation of traffic safety. She suffered bruises and was hospitalised in Warsaw.

== State visits gallery ==
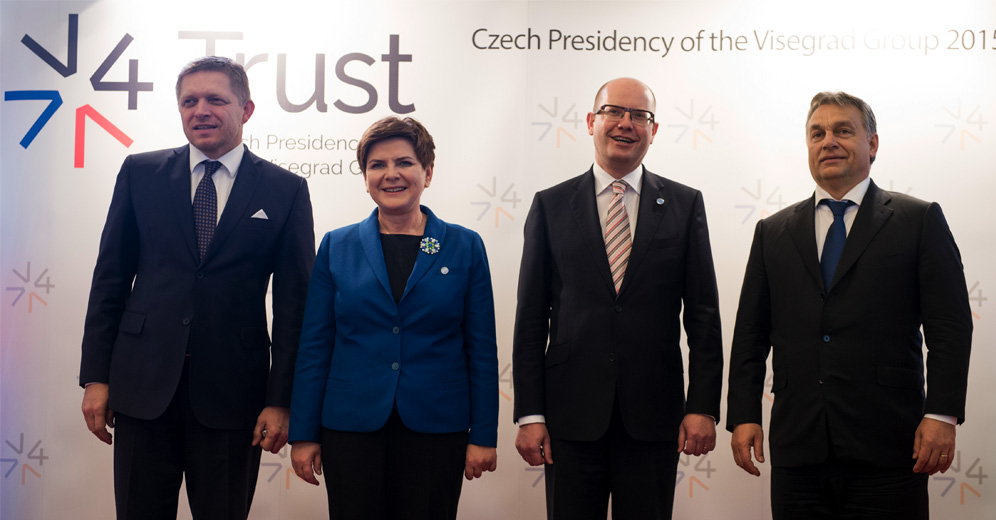
Visegrád Group Leaders: Robert Fico, Szydło, Bohuslav Sobotka, Viktor Orbán (2015)

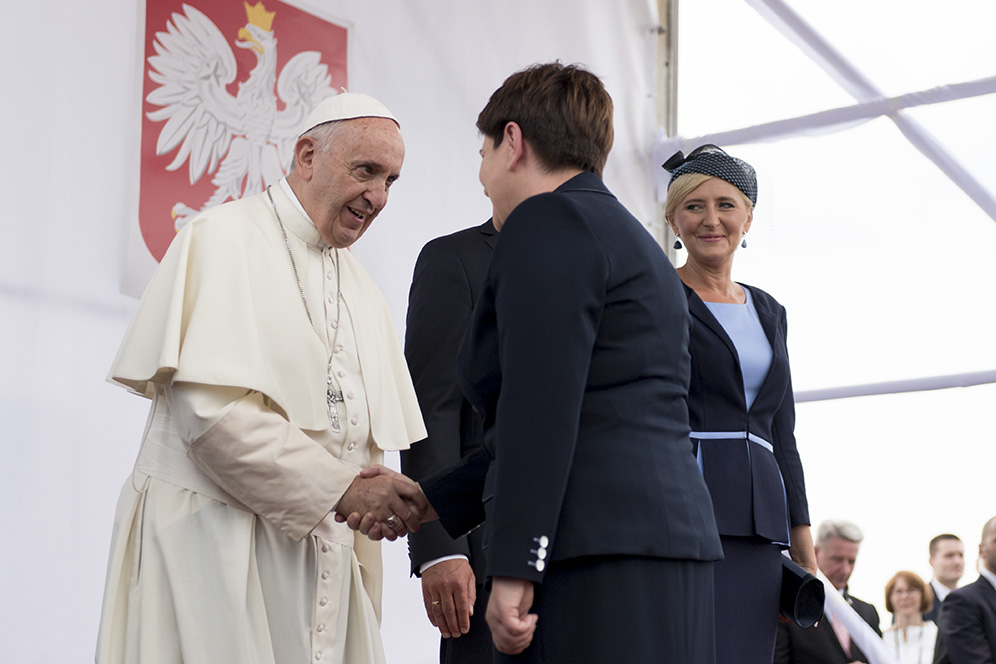
Polish Prime Minister Szydło with Pope Francis (2016)

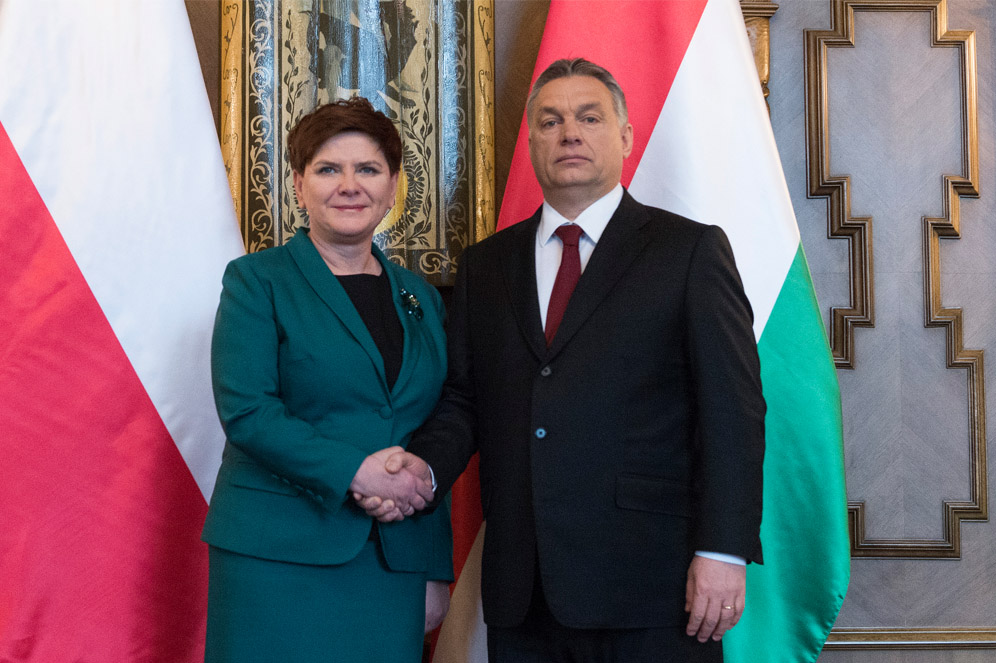
Polish Prime Minister Szydło with Viktor Orbán (2016)

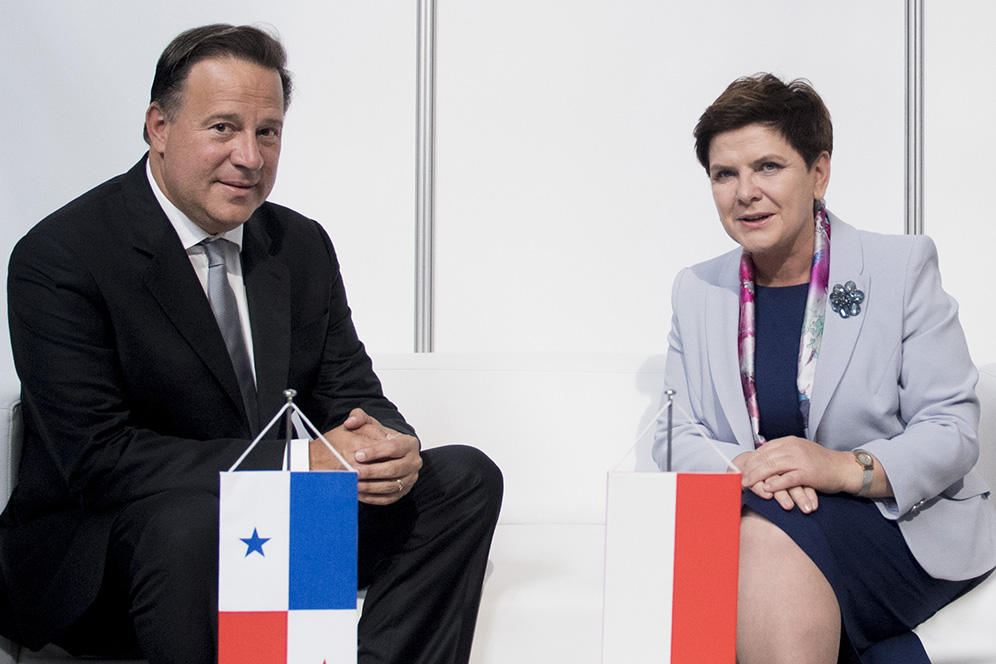
Polish Prime Minister Szydło with Juan Carlos Varela (2016)

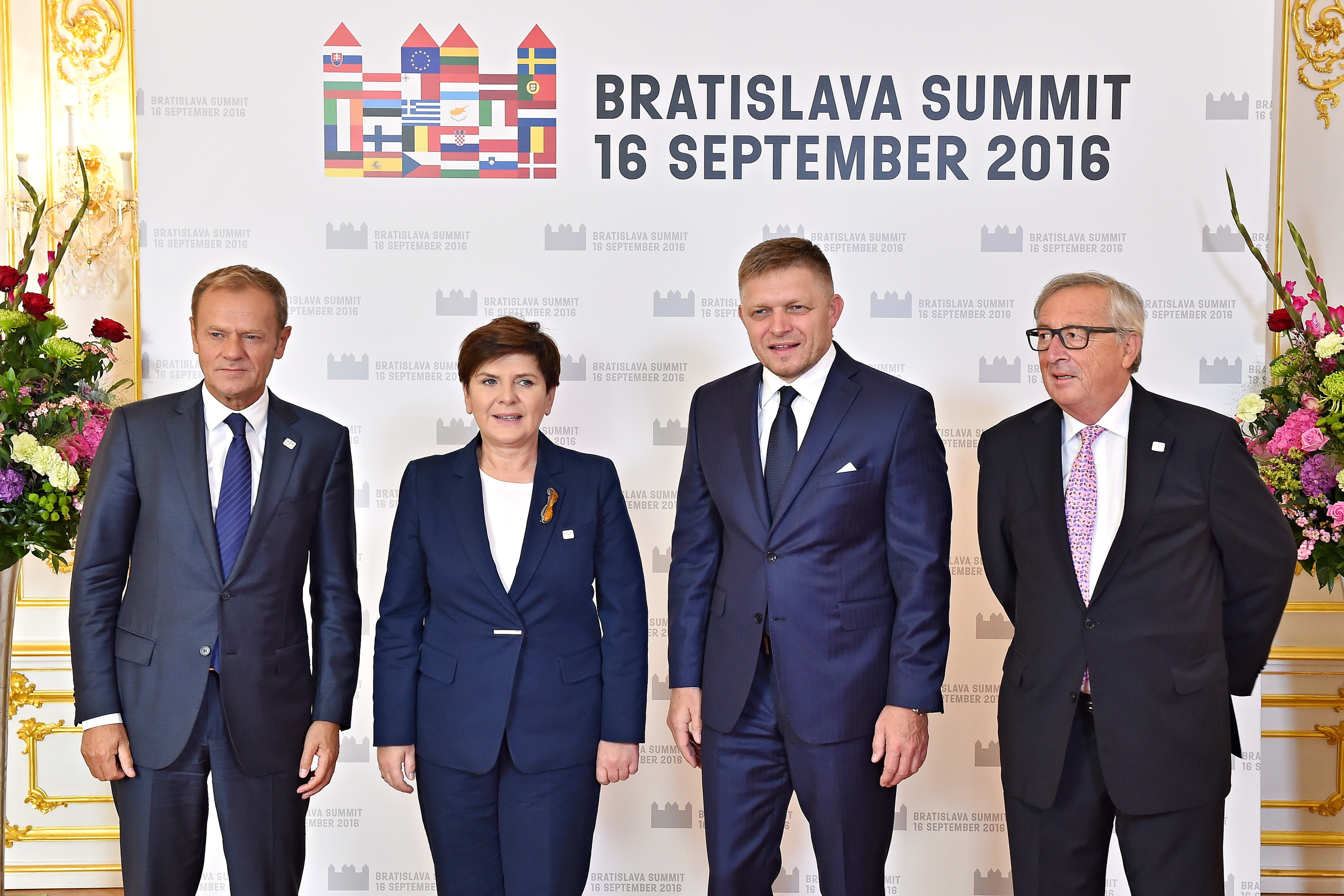
Polish Prime Minister Szydło with Donald Tusk, Robert Fico, Jean-Claude Juncker (2016)

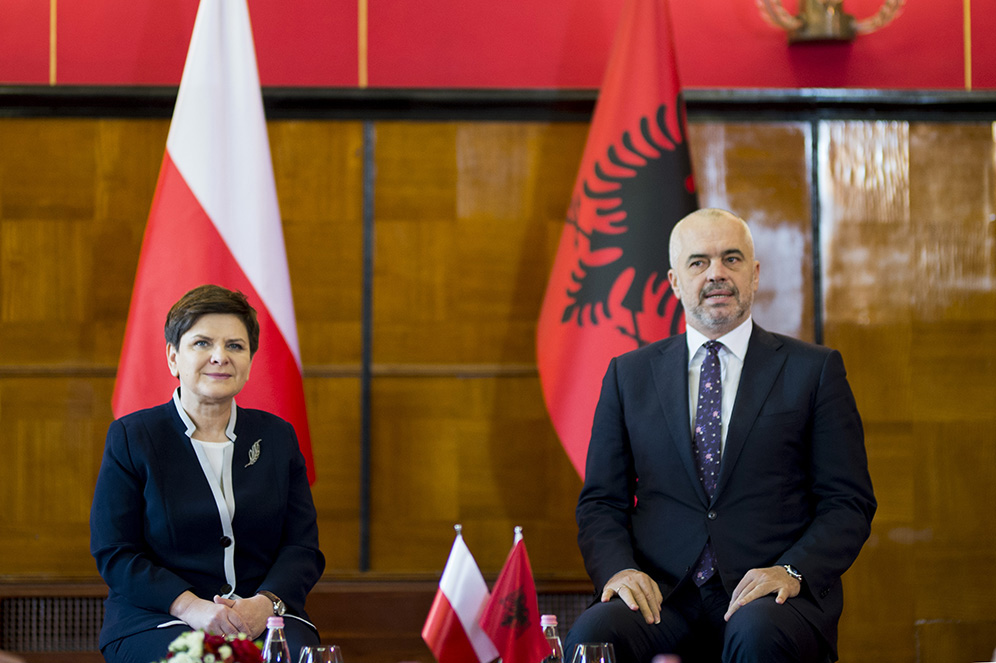
Polish Prime Minister Szydło with Edi Rama (2016)

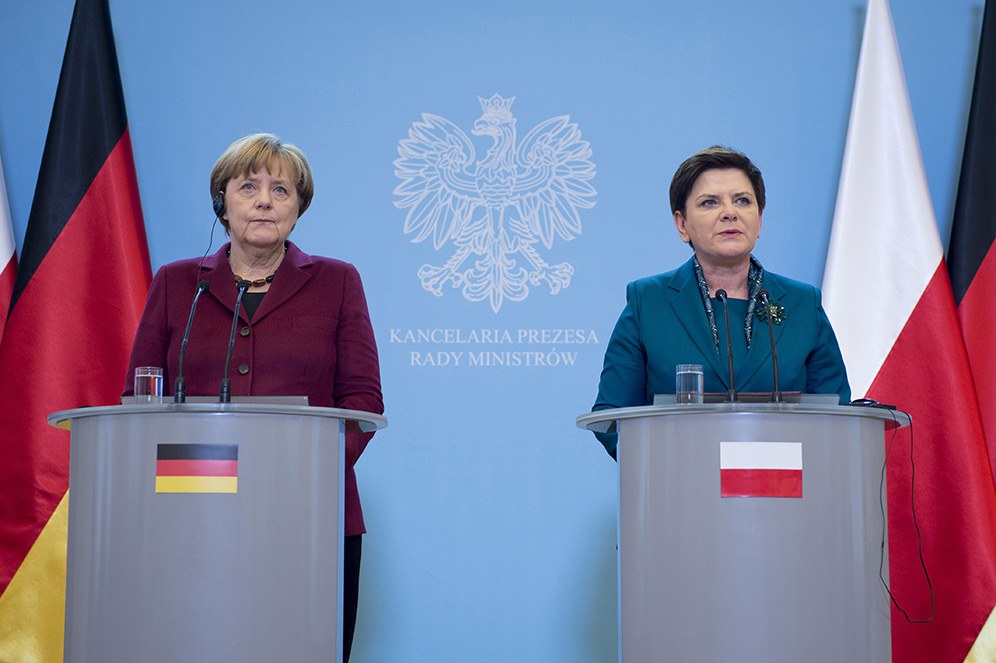
Polish Prime Minister Szydło with Angela Merkel (2017)

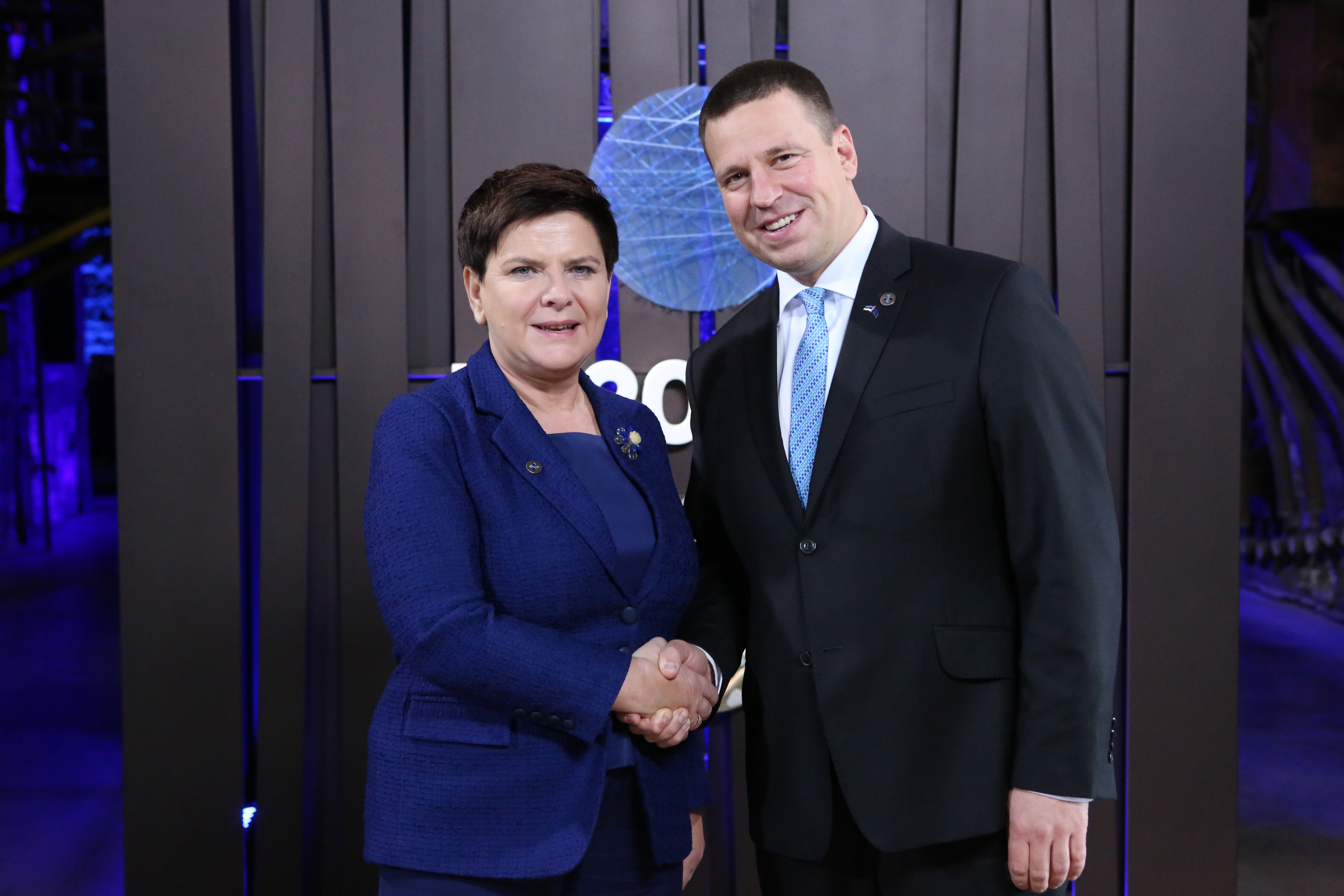
Polish Prime Minister Szydło with Jüri Ratas (2017)

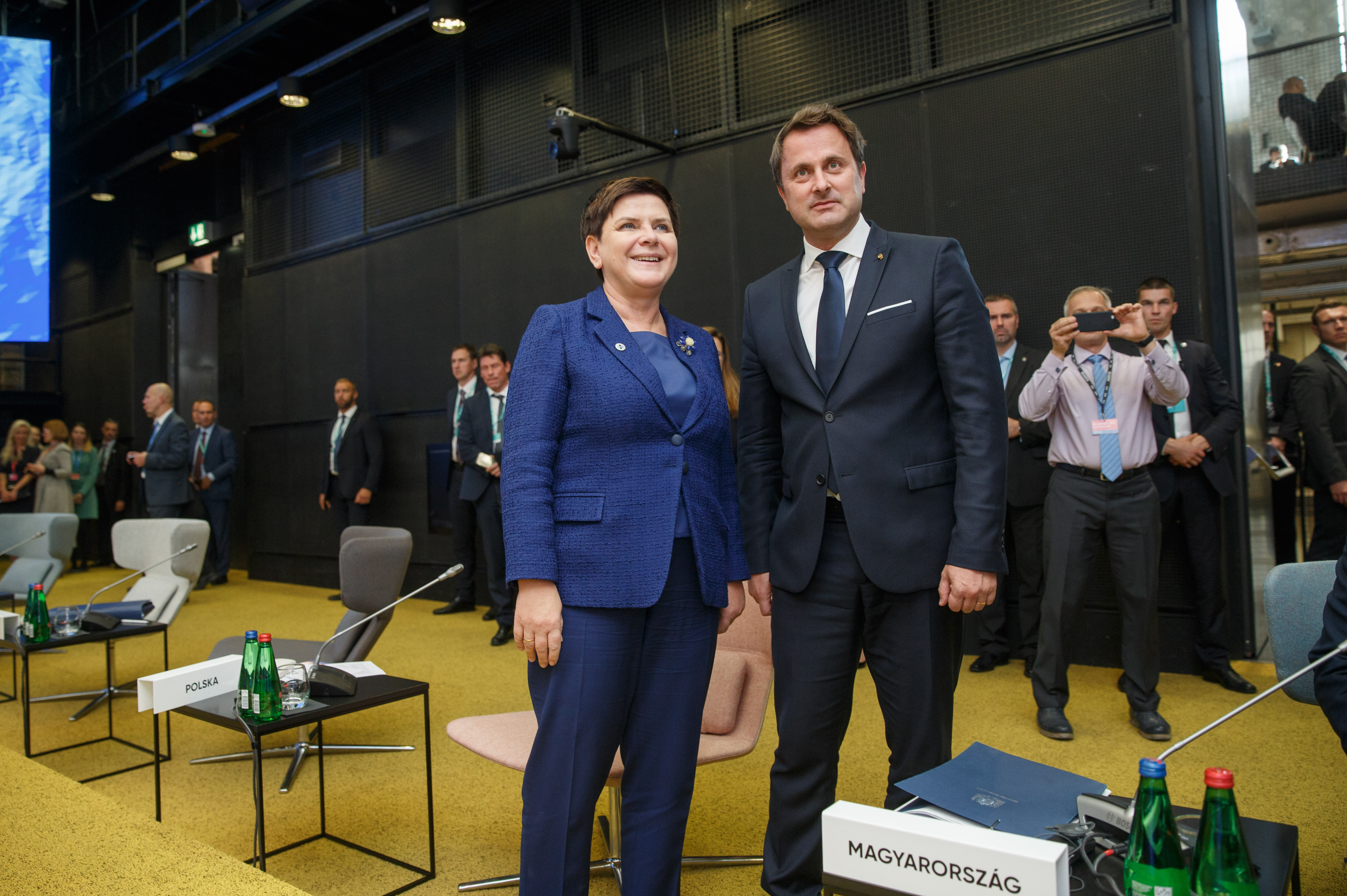
Polish Prime Minister Szydło with Xavier Bettel (2017)

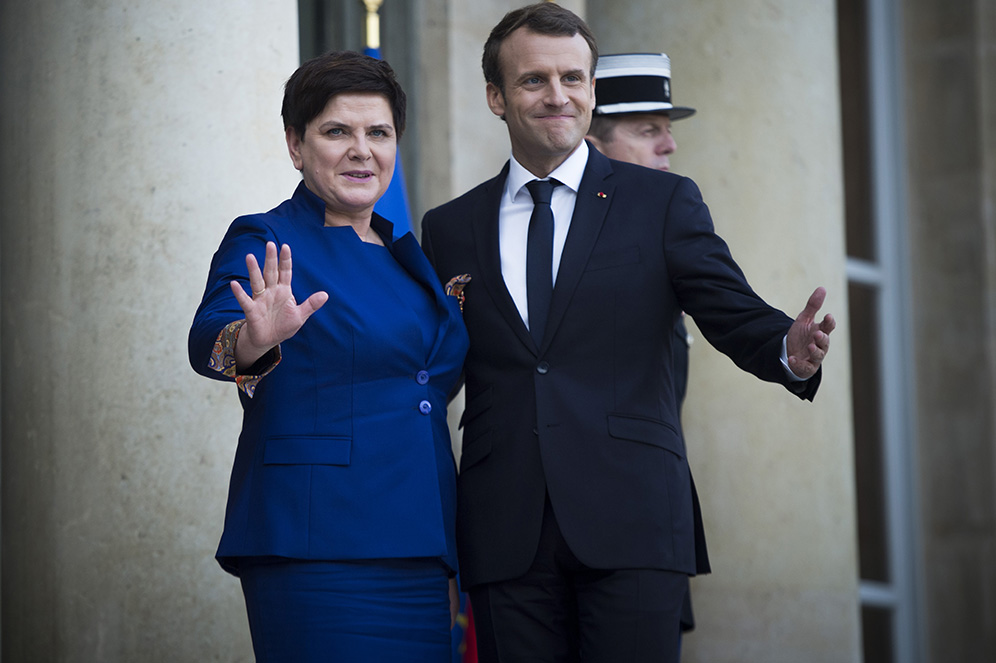
Polish Prime Minister Szydło with Emmanuel Macron (2017)

== See also ==
- Cabinet of Beata Szydło
- History of Poland (1989–present)
- List of political parties in Poland
- List of politicians in Poland
- Politics of Poland
- 2015 Polish parliamentary election
- 2015 Polish presidential election

== Notes ==
Political offices
Preceded by Ewa Kopacz	Prime Minister of Poland; 2015–2017	Succeeded by Mateusz Morawiecki
Preceded by Mateusz Morawiecki	Deputy Prime Minister of Poland; 2017–2019	Succeeded by Jacek Sasin
