= Antonina Kłoskowska =

Polish sociologist

- Born: November 7, 1919 (age 106); Piotrków Trybunalski, Łódź Voivodeship, Second Polish Republic
- Died: July 12, 2001 (aged 81); Warsaw, Masovian Voivodeship, Third Polish Republic
- Title: Professor
- Board member of: FJN; PTS
- Awards: Order of Polonia Restituta; Meritorious Activist of Culture

Academic background
- Education: University of Łódź
- Thesis: Zagadnienie osośbowości człowieka pierwotnego we współczesnej etnosocjologii amerykańskiej (1950)

Academic work
- Discipline: Sociologist
- Sub-discipline: Sociology of culture
- Notable works: Kultura masowa

Antonina Kłoskowska (7 November 1919, Piotrków Trybunalski – 12 July 2001, Warsaw), was a Polish sociologist. In her work, she focused on the sociology of culture. Kłoskowska taught at the universities Łódź (1966–1977) and Warsaw (1977–1990). She was a member of the Polish Academy of Sciences from 1973 and worked in its Institute for Political Studies from 1990. Since 1983, she edited the journal Kultura i Społeczeństwo. From 1989 until 1993, she was the president of the Polish Sociological Association. With Władysław Markiewicz and others, Kłoskowska co-edited a multi-volume Polish complete edition of Bronisław Malinowski's works which appeared 1984–1990.

== Works ==
- 1954: Machiavelli jako humanista na tle włoskiego odrodzenia (transl. Machiavelli as a humanist in the context of the Italian Renaissance). Łódź: Zakład im. Ossolińskich we Wrocławiu [?].
- 1964: Kultura masowa. Krytyka i obrona (transl. Mass culture: Critique and defence). 2nd edition, Warszawa: Państwowe Wydawnictwo Naukowe. ISBN 83-01-01511-X
- 1969: Z historii i socjologii kultury (transl. On the history and sociology of culture)
- 1972: Społeczne ramy kultury (transl. The social framework of culture)
- 1977 (ed. with Guido Martinotti): Education in a changing society. London: 1977. ISBN 0-8039-9984-4
- 1981: Socjologia kultury (transl. Sociology of culture). Warszawa: Państwowe Wydawnictwo Naukowe. ISBN 83-01-02697-9
- 1983: (et al., eds.) Naród, kultura, osobowość: księga poświęcona Profesorowi Józefowi Chałasińskiemu (transl. Nation, culture, personality: Festschrift for Professor Józef Chałasiński). Wrocław: Zakład im. Ossolińskich. ISBN 83-04-01220-0
- 1990 (ed.): Oblicza polskości (transl. The face of Polishness). Warszawa: Uniwersytet Warszawski, Program Badań i Współtworzenia Filozofii Pokoju.
- 1991 (ed.): Encyklopedia kultury polskiej XX wieku (tom 1): pojęcia i problemy wiedzy o kulturze (transl. The encyclopedia of Polish culture in the 20th century (vol. 1): Concepts and problems of knowledge about culture). Wrocław: Wiedza o Kulturze. ISBN 83-7044-022-3
- 1994 (ed. with Richard Grathoff): The neighbourhood of cultures. Warszawa: Instytut Studiów Politycznych PAN. ISBN 83-85479-65-1
- 1996: Kultury narodowe u korzeni Warszawa: Państwowe Wydawnictwo Naukowe. ISBN 83-01-11997-7
  English translation 2001: National cultures at the grass-root level. Budapest/New York: Central European University Press. ISBN 963-9116-83-1
