= Przegląd Socjologiczny =

- Discipline: Sociology
- Language: Polish
- Edited by: Sylwia Męcfal (2026)

Publication details
- History: 1930-present
- Publisher: Łódzkie Towarzystwo Naukowe (Łódź Scientific Society) (Poland)
- Frequency: Quarterly
- Open access: since 2013
- License: Creative Commons Attribution 4.0 International (CC BY 4.0) [since 2023]
- Impact factor: (2021)

Standard abbreviations
- ISO 4: Prz. Socjol.

Indexing
- ISSN: 0033-2356 (print); 2450-9361 (web)
- LCCN: 55059039
- OCLC no.: 3044260

Links
- Journal homepage; https://journals.ltn.lodz.pl/Przeglad-Socjologiczny/Indexation; Online indexes

The Przegląd Socjologiczny is a quarterly Polish peer-reviewed academic journal in sociology. It is published by the Łódzkie Towarzystwo Naukowe (Łódź Scientific Society). Journal offices are at the University of Łódź.

It is the oldest Polish journal in the field of sociology, published since 1930. It was established by Florian Znaniecki and published by the Polish Institute of Sociology (Polski Instytut Socjologiczny) in Poznań. Establishment of this journal was a milestone in the development of sociology in Poland. Publishing of the journal was interrupted by World War II. After the war, the journal was published in the years 1946–1947, then disestablished as part of the ban on the field of sociology instituted by the communist government. Publication resumed following the liberalization of Polish October of 1956, under the Łódzkie Towarzystwo Naukowe (Łódź Scientific Society).

The journal publishes articles in Polish and English, with summaries in both languages.

== Abstracting and indexing ==
The Przegląd Socjologiczny is abstracted and indexed in EBSCOhost, the Central and Eastern European Online Library, and ProQuest databases.
