= Social Committee of the Council of Ministers =

Advisory body to the government of Poland

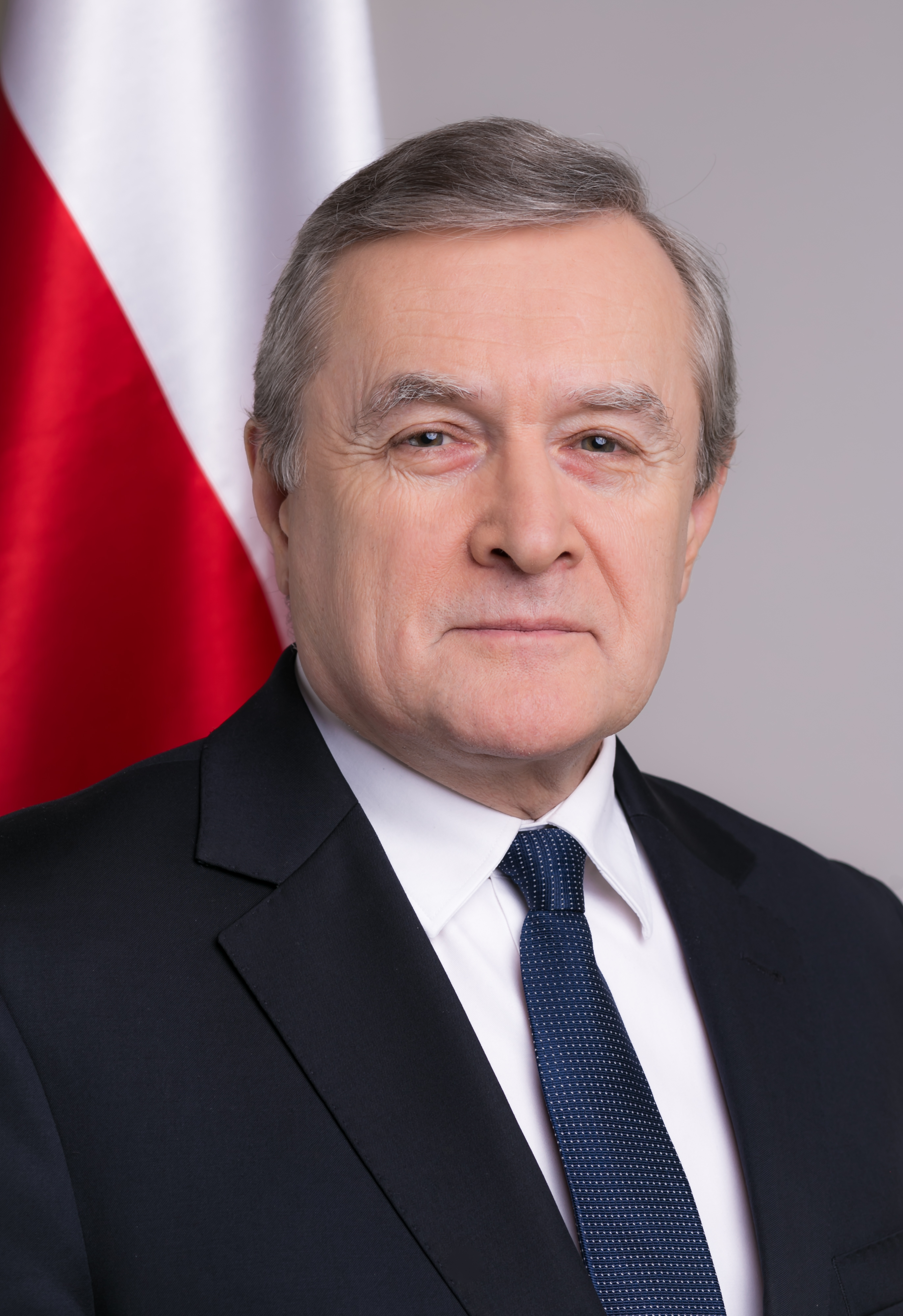
Piotr Gliński, last chairperson of the Committee

The Social Committee of the Council of Ministers (Polish: Komitet Społeczny Rady Ministrów) was an advisory body to the Council of Ministers and the Prime Minister of Poland. The committee's major objective was to shape and overview social policy of the government. It was established in December 2017 under the First Cabinet of Mateusz Morawiecki and continued working during his second and third tenure, until it was abolished in March 2024 after the shift of power, under the Donald Tusk's cabinet. The first chairperson was Deputy Prime Minister Beata Szydło (2017–2019), the previous prime minister, and followed by Deputy Prime Minister Piotr Gliński (2019–2023).

== History ==
On December 8, 2017, Beata Szydło resigned as Prime Minister. Her resignation was accepted by the President of Poland, and the formation of the new government was entrusted to Mateusz Morawiecki. Morawiecki had served as one of the Deputy Prime Ministers in Szydło's cabinet, and Szydło was appointed Deputy Prime Minister in Morawiecki's cabinet. On December 20, Morawiecki issued a regulation that established the Social Committee and entrusted it to Beata Szydło's presidency.

Following her election election to the European Parliament, Beata Szydło tendered her resignation as a member of the cabinet on June 3. On June 18, the Prime Minister altered the 2017 regulation and placed the Social Committee the presidency of then Piotr Gliński, the then Deputy Prime Minister. The regulation took effect on June 24.

The Committee continued in existence upon the 2019 Polish parliamentary election and the subsequent formation of the Second Cabinet of Mateusz Morawiecki. Piotr Gliński's presidency was upheld. As of November 2023, the position of chairman remained vacant.

Abolished by order of the Prime Minister in March 2024.

== Purposes and composition ==
The objective of the Social Committee of the Council of Ministers is the initiation, supervision, and coordination of any governmental projects aiming to improve the situation of Polish families before the projects may be submitted to the Sejm. The committee is required to accordingly conduct analyses and assessments and to take upon any other tasks delegated by the Prime Minister.

The composition of the Committee is specified by the Prime Minister's regulation and includes particular ministers or, in case of their absence, respective ministerial secretaries of state. Meetings are presided by the President, appointed and dismissed by the Prime Minister by way of regulation. The Prime Minister chairs the meetings at which they are present.

== List of presidents ==
- Beata Szydło (20 December 2017 – 3 June 2019)
- Piotr Gliński (24 June 2019 – 27 November 2023)
