= Contemplative education =

Method of study

Contemplative education is a philosophy of higher education that integrates introspection and experiential learning into academic study in order to support academic and social engagement, develop self-understanding as well as analytical and critical capacities, and cultivate skills for engaging constructively with others.

The inclusion of contemplative and introspective practices in academia addresses an increasingly recognized imbalance in higher education: a lack of support for developing purpose and meaning, or for helping students "learn who they are, search for a larger purpose for their lives, and leave college as better human beings". Especially in the current context that the value of Liberal Art Education is being challenged, the urgency in reviewing and innovating its pedagogy becomes prominent. Since "the liberal arts are meant to instruct and inspire", its education pedagogy should then entail "both formal study and self-discovery, shared inquiry and self-understanding" for the whole person.

== Philosophy ==
Informed by the many forms of contemplative practice in philosophies and religions the world over, contemplative education invites students to embrace the immediacy of their interior lives as a means for applying their own first-person experiences to what they are learning in their classrooms. Contemplative practices invite close observation of phenomena (e.g., natural processes, cultural productions, mental and emotional states, biases, media). These practices provide opportunities to develop attention and focus, increase awareness and understanding, listen and speak across difference, support creative approaches to problem solving, and consider the impacts of our actions on the world at large.

Contemplative education is not solely traditional education with, for example, a course in meditation thrown in; it is an approach that offers an entirely new way of understanding what it means to be educated in the modern Western liberal arts tradition. For example, to deepen their academic study, students might engage in mindfulness practices in order to cultivate being present-moment awareness, or engage in dialogue and deep listening practices in order to develop interpersonal skills and be more conscious of the body. Contemplative studies encourage students to push the typical epistemic guidelines to learning and live in a more mindful world.

== Popularity ==
In the past two decades, contemplative practices have become increasingly incorporated across curricular settings. It is very difficult to provide exact numbers; however, recent reviews have clearly depicted this as a historical change in which primary, secondary and higher public (not only alternative) educational institutions are becoming far more receptive to these practices. Contemplative studies can be applied in many disciplines, and are already used in not only wisdom traditions, but in branches of scientific thought, social sciences, humanities, and business, to enhance intelligence and well-being. The students at the Universities can study contemplative methods through practicing meditation of hatha-yoga as it is introduced to the programme of the sociology by Krzysztof Konecki.

The philosophy of contemplative education has been present in the United States since at least 1974, but has gained popularity particularly recently as contemplative practices (such as mindfulness and yoga) have sparked the interest of educators at all levels. It has inspired networks of higher-education professionals for the advancement of contemplative education, primarily the Association for Contemplative Mind in Higher Education (ACMHE), which has an international membership of over 750 faculty, administrators, and higher education professionals. The ACMHE was founded in 2008 by the Center for Contemplative Mind in Society in Massachusetts which has hosted annual conferences on contemplative education since 2009. These retreats encourage curriculum development and have issued 130+ fellowships for integrated contemplative studies programs. The formation of the ACMHE was precipitated by the Contemplative Practice Fellowships, a program administered by the Center for Contemplative Mind in Society from 1997 through 2009. Fellowships were awarded to 153 faculty members at 107 colleges and universities for designing and teaching courses which included contemplative methods. This initiative helped to form a community of practice on the use of contemplative methods across higher education disciplines.

While contemplative education aims to integrate contemplative practices and perspectives within any subject of study, the discipline of contemplative studies—the examination of the contemplative experience itself—has also developed. The Contemplative Studies Initiative at Brown University, founded by Harold Roth, Professor of Religious Studies and Director of the Contemplative Studies Initiative, offers a formal concentration in contemplative studies.

Contemplative education also fueled the Bachelor of Fine Arts in Jazz and Contemplative Studies curriculum at The University of Michigan School of Music, which combines meditation practice and related studies with jazz and overall musical training.

In Colorado, the Rocky Mountain Contemplative Higher Education Network (RMCHEN) launched in September 2006 with an event hosted by Naropa University. Peter Schneider, a renowned architecture professor at the University of Colorado-Boulder and Barbara Dilley, a former president of Naropa and an accomplished dancer, choreographer and educator, spoke at the launch of RMCHEN.

Contemplative media studies are a recent, pressing, topic due to the influx of technology in society. As its influence continues to increase, contemplative media studies is aimed at articulating an ethically responsive and economically sustainable architecture of human flourishing.

Dr Han F. de Wit, the author of "Contemplative psychology", outlined one of the first systematic works suggesting a framework in which a full-fledged contemplative psychology may be developed.

== In practice at Naropa University ==
Students’ engagement with contemplative practices is intended to support focused attention and reflection in learning and teaching at Naropa University (Boulder, Colorado) founded by Chögyam Trungpa, Rinpoche in 1974.

"The point is not to abandon scholarship but to ground it, to personalize it and to balance it with the fundamentals of mind training, especially the practice of sitting meditation so that inner development and outer knowledge go hand in hand. . . . A balanced education cultivates abilities beyond the verbal and conceptual to include matters of heart, character, creativity, self-knowledge, concentration, openness and mental flexibility."

—Judy Lief, former Naropa University president

=== Contemplative disciplines ===
Woven into the curriculum at Naropa, for example, are practices that include sitting meditation, tai chi, aikido, yoga, Chinese brushstroke and ikebana.

These are some of the most commonly referred-to contemplative practices, but there are many others, including other traditional arts, ritual practices and activist practices.
