= Catherine Kerr (neuroscientist) =

American neuroscientist

- Born: 1964; Los Angeles, California, US
- Died: November 12, 2016; Watertown, Massachusetts, US
- Education: Amherst College (1985) Johns Hopkins University (1996)
- Occupations: Assistant Professor of Medicine and Family Medicine Director of Translational Neuroscience, Brown University
- Awards: National Mellon Fellowship Derek Bok Excellence in Teaching Award

Catherine Kerr was an assistant professor of medicine, Assistant Professor of family medicine, and the Director of Translational Neuroscience in the Contemplative Studies Initiative at Brown University at her untimely death in November, 2016. Kerr received her bachelor's from Amherst College before completing her Ph.D. at Johns Hopkins University. Following this she was a post doctoral fellow and Instructor at Harvard Medical School, and it was here that she received a career development award from the NIH to conduct research into the cognitive neuroscience of meditation. She joined Brown's Department of Family Medicine and Contemplative Studies Initiative in 2011.

== Work ==
Her research primarily involved investigating the effects that body-based attention practices such as Tai Chi and mindfulness have on the brain and the nervous system. Her lab specifically focused on sensory and motor cortical dynamics engaged by body-based attention and mindfulness because they see these processes as key to the effects of many contemplative practices. Kerr's work has also been featured in popular culture and media - she can be seen in Forbes, The New York Times, and gave a TED Talk on neural bases of the effects of mindfulness. Kerr continued to receive grants for her growing body of work, which was increasingly cited through her lifetime. Such grants included a NIH grant to study asthma symptom management via mindfulness training. Other notable work Kerr was involved in includes:

- National Center for Complementary and Alternative Medicine (NCCAM) / NIH, "Effects of Mindfulness Meditation on Somatosensory Cortical Maps in Chronic Pain"
- Frontiers in Human Neuroscience 2013; 13, 7–12, "Mindfulness starts with the body: Somatosensory attention and cortical alpha modulation in mindfulness meditation"
- Mindfulness 2014, "Moving beyond mindfulness: Defining equanimity as an outcome measure in meditation and contemplative research"
- Culture, Medicine, and Psychiatry 2002; 26(4):419-447, "Translating 'mind-in-body': two models of patient experience underlying a randomized controlled trial of qigong"
