= Jan Pakulski =

Polish-born Australian sociologist

Jan Pakulski FASSA (born 1950 in Łódź, Poland) is a Polish-born Australian sociologist.

He received a master's degree in sociology in 1973 at the University of Warsaw, and has been living in Australia since 1975 where he completed a PhD at the Australian National University in 1980.

Pakulski taught at the University of Tasmania. He was named professor of sociology in 1998, served as head of the School of Sociology and Social Work from 1998 to 2001, and was executive dean of arts between 2001 and 2008. He has held the title of emeritus professor since 2014 and was a fellow of the Academy of the Social Sciences in Australia (2006+), at St Antony's College, Oxford, a visiting professor at Nanyang University, Singapore, and an affiliate at the Stanford Center on Poverty and Inequality, Stanford University. He was also part of the editorial board of the Polish Sociological Review. From 2015, he served as a Professor at Collegium Civitas, Warsaw.

His book The Death Of Class (co-written with Professor Malcolm Waters) has been used as an undergraduate textbook.

His most recent publication, a chapter titled The Development Of Elite Theory in the Palgrave Handbook Of Elites is targeted at policy-makers and members of parliament.

== Awards and recognition ==
He was awarded the Golden of Cross of Merit from the Polish Republic (1991) for his activism for Polish-Australian relations, especially with respect to his work for the POLCUL Foundation for which he has served as director since 1980. He was President of the Australian Institute of Polish Affairs (AIPA) 2001–05, and 2009–13, and currently holds a position of Vice-President.

== Selected publications ==
- Social Movements: The Politics of Moral Protest, Melbourne Longman Cheshire, 1991.
- Postmodernization: Change in Advanced Society (with S. Crook and M. Waters) London: Sage, 1992 Chinese translation 1994.
- The Death of Class (with M. Waters) London Sage, 1996.
- Postcommunist Elites and Democracy in Eastern Europe (eds with J. Higley and W. Wesolowski) London: Macmillan, 1998.
- Globalizing Inequalities Sydney: Allen and Unwin, 2004.
- Toward Leader Democracy (with A. Korosenyi) New York and London: Anthem Press, 2012 (paperback edition 2014).
- Leadership Failures in Australian Politics (with B. Tranter), Sydney and NY: Palgrave/Macmillan, 2015.
- The Visegrad Countries in Crisis (ed.), Warsaw: Collegium Civitas, 2016 (full text available).
- Palgrave Handbook of Elites (section editor and author in H. Best and J. Higley edition). London and New York: Palgrave Macmillan 2018.
