= Nina Assorodobraj-Kula =

Polish sociologist (1908–1999)

- Born: 16 August 1908; Warsaw, Congress Poland
- Died: 6 November 1999 (aged 91); Warsaw, Poland
- Occupation: Sociologist

Academic background
- Education: University of Warsaw
- Doctoral advisor: Stefan Czarnowski

Nina Assorodobraj-Kula (16 August 1908 – 6 November 1999) was a Polish sociologist. She was president of the Polish Sociological Association from 1964 to 1968.

== Biography ==
Daughter of Nachman Naum Assorodobraj and Rywka née Wierchowska.

In 1930, she completed her master's degree at the University of Warsaw under the supervision of Marceli Handelsman. In 1935 she obtained doctorate upon dissertation supervised by Stefan Czarnowski. In the years 1937–1939 she completed an internship in Paris. From 1939 to 1941, she worked at the Ossolineum in Lviv. In June 1941, she moved to Warsaw, where she taught in secret secondary schools. In 1968 she was expelled from the Polish United Workers' Party.

She was president of the Polish Sociological Association from 1964 to 1968.

She was married to Witold Kula, and was mother to Marcin Kula.

Barbara Szacka was among her doctoral students.

== Works ==
- Zagadnienie siły roboczej w zaraniu industrializmu. Poznań. 1935.
- Początki klasy robotniczej: problem rąk roboczych w przemyśle polskim epoki stanisławowskiej. Warsaw: Spółdzielnia Wydawnicza "Czytelnik". 1946.
- Założenie teoretyczne historiografii Lelewela. Warsaw. 1955.
- Les conditions sociales de la formation des théories de l'évolution et du progrès. Paris. 1956.
- Wokół teorii ekonomicznych "Kapitału". Warsaw. 1967.

=== Editions ===
- Listy emigrantów z Brazylii i Stanów Zjednoczonych 1890–1891. Warsaw. 1973. Co-edited with Witold Kula and Marcin Kula. Second edition: 2012.
- Kula, Witold (1994). Dziennik czasów okupacji. Warsaw. Co-edited with Marcin Kula.

=== Articles ===
- "Elementy świadomości klasowej mieszczaństwa". Przegląd Socjologiczny. 10. 1948.
- "Historia żywa. Świadomość historyczna: symptomy i propozycje badawcze". Studia Socjologiczne. 2 (9): 5–45. 1963.

=== Translations ===
- Maunier, René (1932). Wprowadzenie do socjologii. Nasza Księgarnia.

== Accolades ==
- Gold Cross of Merit (11 May 1946)
- Medal of the 10th Anniversary of People's Poland (19 January 1955)
- Commander's Cross with Star of the Order of Polonia Restituta "for outstanding achievements in the field of sociology, for merits in scientific and teaching work" (24 September 1998)
