= Polish Sociological Review =

- Discipline: Sociology
- Language: English
- Edited by: Krzysztof Zagorski

Publication details
- Former name: The Polish Sociological Bulletin
- History: 1961-present
- Publisher: Polish Sociological Association (Poland)
- Frequency: Quarterly
- Impact factor: 0.12 (2014)

Standard abbreviations
- ISO 4: Pol. Sociol. Rev.

Indexing
- CODEN: PSREFL
- ISSN: 1231-1413
- LCCN: sn94029466
- OCLC no.: 175680586

Links
- Journal homepage; Online indexes

The Polish Sociological Review is a quarterly peer-reviewed academic journal published by the Polish Sociological Association. It covers diverse areas of sociology, especially social theory, social structure, social change, culture and politics in global perspective. The journal publishes articles in English.

Until 1993 it was published under the name Polish Sociological Bulletin.

== Abstracting and indexing ==
The Polish Sociological Review is abstracted and indexed in:

- JCR
- Social Sciences Citation Index
- CSA Sociological Abstracts
- CSA Linguistics and Language Behaviour Abstracts
- CSA Social Planning/Policy and Development Abstracts
- Scopus
- SocINDEX

According to the Journal Citation Reports, the journal has a 2011 impact factor of 0.071, ranking it 132nd out of 137 journals in the category "Sociology".

== Editorial board ==
Editor in Chief Krzysztof Zagórski (Kozminski University) psr@pts.org.pl Statistical Editor Katarzyna Piotrowska (Kozminski University) Managing Editor Hanna Mokrzycka psr@pts.org.pl Editorial Board Zygmunt Bauman (University of Leeds), Zbigniew Bokszański (University of Łódź), Henryk Domański (Polish Academy of Sciences), Irina Tomescu-Dubrow (Polish Academy of Sciences, Ohio State University), Sven Eliaeson (University of Uppsala), Brian Green (Keen College), Michal Illner (Czech Academy of Sciences), Jarosław Kilias (University of Warsaw), Martin Krygier (University of New South Wales), Jan Kubik (Rutgers University), Joanna Kurczewska (Polish Academy of Sciences), György Lengyel (Budapest University of Economic Sciences), Rachel Lovell (Case Western Reserve University), Arvydas Matulionis (Lithuanian Social Research Centre), Barbara Misztal (University of Leicester), Janusz Mucha (AGH University), Michał Nowosielski (Institute for Western Affairs), David Ost (Hobart William Smith Colleges), Jan Pakulski (University of Tasmania), Grażyna Skąpska (Jagiellonian University), Kazimierz M. Słomczyński (Polish Academy of Sciences; Ohio State University), Jerzy Szacki (University of Warsaw) Jan Zielonka (Oxford University)
