= Piotr Gliński =

Polish sociologist and politician

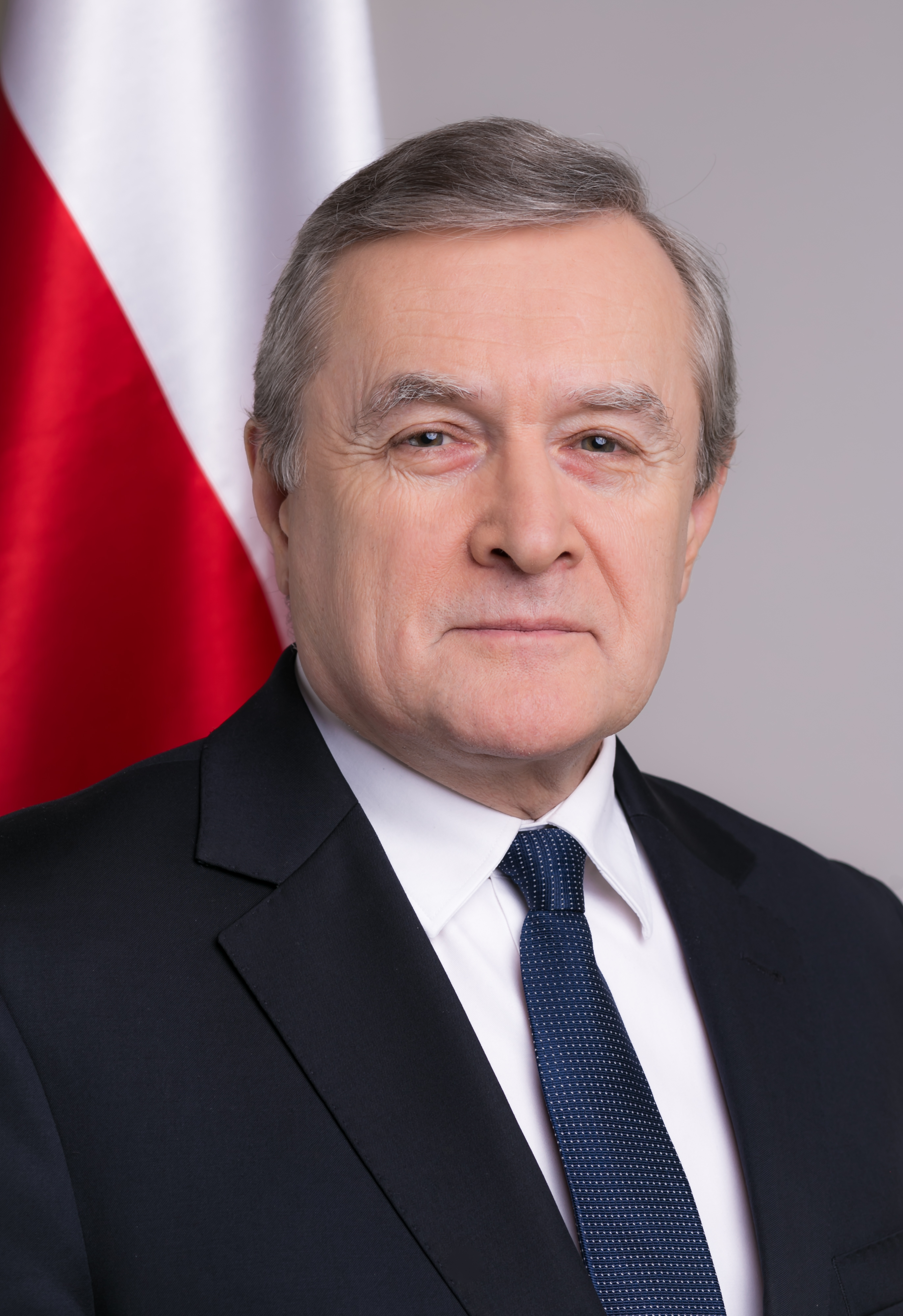
- Official portrait, 2017

Deputy Prime Minister of Poland
- In office 16 November 2015 – 21 June 2023
- President: Andrzej Duda
- Prime Minister: Beata Szydło; Mateusz Morawiecki
- Preceded by: Tomasz Siemoniak; Janusz Piechociński

Minister of Culture, National Heritage and Sport
- In office 16 November 2015 – 27 November 2023
- President: Andrzej Duda
- Prime Minister: Beata Szydło; Mateusz Morawiecki
- Preceded by: Małgorzata Omilanowska
- Succeeded by: Dominika Chorosińska

Member of the Sejm
- Incumbent
- Assumed office 12 November 2015
- Constituency: Łódź

Chairman of the Public Benefit Committee
- In office 8 November 2017 – 27 November 2023
- President: Andrzej Duda
- Prime Minister: Beata Szydło; Mateusz Morawiecki
- Deputy: Adam Lipiński
- Preceded by: Position established
- Succeeded by: Dominika Chorosińska

Chairman of the Social Committee of the Council of Ministers
- In office 4 June 2019 – 27 November 2023
- President: Andrzej Duda
- Prime Minister: Mateusz Morawiecki
- Deputy: Rafał Bochenek; Michał Woś
- Preceded by: Beata Szydło
- Succeeded by: Position abolished

President of the Polish Sociological Association
- In office 1 July 2005 – 1 July 2011
- Preceded by: Włodzimierz Wesołowski
- Succeeded by: Grażyna Skąpska

Personal details
- Born: 20 April 1954 (age 72) Warsaw, Poland
- Party: Law and Justice
- Education: University of Warsaw; Polish Academy of Sciences
- Profession: Sociologist
- Awards: Order of Polonia Restituta
- Website: www.piotrglinski.info.pl

Piotr Tadeusz Gliński (Note: Polish pronunciation: [ˈpjɔtr ˈɡlʲiɲ.skʲi]) (born 20 April 1954) is a Polish sociologist, professor, university lecturer and politician. He served as president of the Polish Sociological Association from 2005 to 2011. He was the nominee of Law and Justice for Prime Minister of Poland in 2012 and again in 2014. In the cabinet of Beata Szydło, he served as the First Deputy Prime Minister and the Minister of Culture and National Heritage. from 2015 to 2023. in the government of Mateusz Morawiecki.

== Early life and education ==
Piotr Tadeusz Gliński was born in Warsaw on 20 April 1954. In 1973, he graduated from the Bolesław Prus High School in Warsaw. He studied at the Institute of Economic Sciences and the Institute of Sociology of the University of Warsaw, earning a master's degree in economics in 1978. He then completed doctoral studies in the Institute of Philosophy and Sociology of the Polish Academy of Sciences. In 1984, on the basis of Labor Economic Conditions Lifestyle: Urban Families in Poland in the Seventies, written under the direction of Andrzej Siciński, he received a Ph.D. degree in humanities. He received his habilitation at the Institute of Philosophy and Sociology in 1997 with a thesis entitled The Polish Greens: The Social Movement in Transition.

== Academic career ==
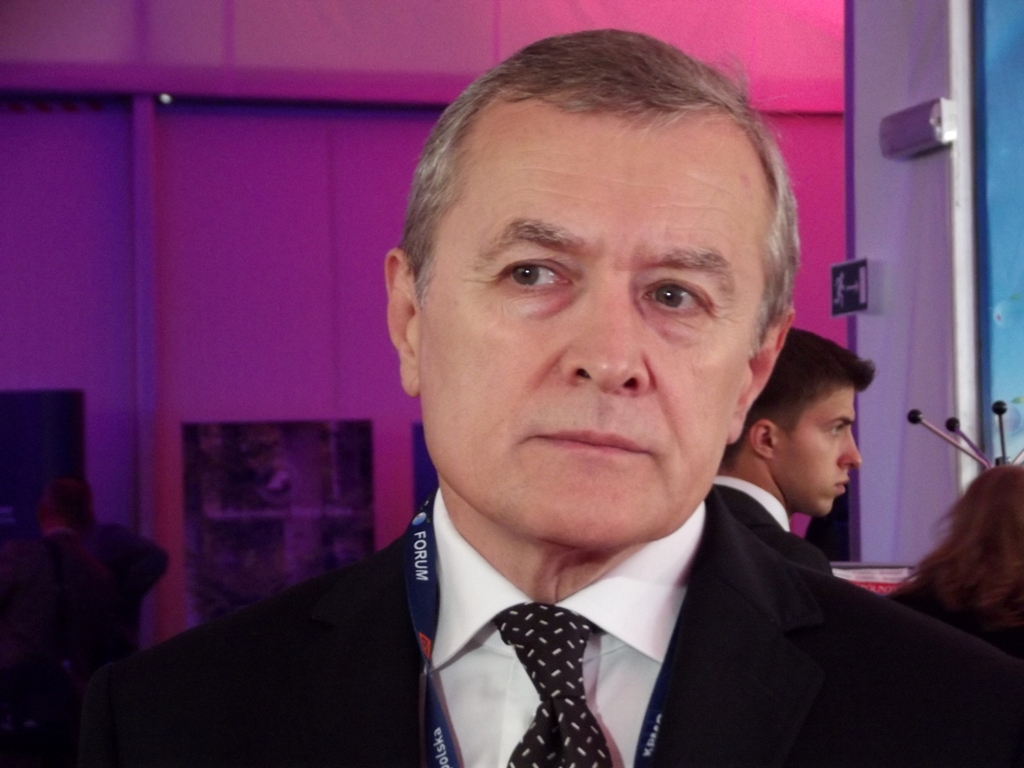
Gliński at the 2013 Economic Forum in Krynica

Professionally associated since the late 1970s with the Institute of Philosophy and Sociology of the Polish Academy of Sciences, he has held various positions. From 1997 to 2005, head of the Civil Society. He was a professor at the Institute of Sociology at the University of Bialystok and head of the Department of Sociology at the university. He was awarded internships outside Poland, lecturing in European universities. His academic specialty was the study of social movements, sociology of culture and civil society, as well as in the social aspects of environmental protection. He participated in the work of the Committee for Research and Forecasting Poland in 2000 and the Committee of Man and the Environment. He has been a consultant for national and international institutions, including the Polish ministries and the United Nations Development Programme.

In 1986, he co-organized the Section of Social Forecasting of the Polish Sociological Association. From 1995 to 1997 he was treasurer of the PSA, vice-president of the organization, and from 2005 to 2011 he served as its president. In 1989 he became a member of the Social Ecological Institute, which he headed from 1997 to 2003. He was a founding member of the Society for the creation of the Mazury National Park. He is also a member of the Collegium Invisibile. In 2003, he participated in the creation of the party Greens 2004, but due to its adoption of a leftist agenda, ultimately did not join. In 2008 Gliński received the title of professor of humanities.

== Public life ==
On 1 October 2012, Law and Justice announced Gliński as candidate for Prime Minister with a request for a constructive vote of no confidence against the government of Donald Tusk. On 16 June 2014, Law and Justice filed a repeat request, again naming Gliński as a candidate for the office.

Four days after the 2015 Polish parliamentary election on 16 November he was nominated Deputy Prime Minister and Minister of Culture and National Heritage in the Cabinet of Beata Szydło. He was appointed by President Andrzej Duda as the Chairman of the Public Benefit Committee in 2017.

He retained his Ministry after the October 2019 Polish parliamentary election, by which Mateusz Morawiecki was elected Prime Minister.

== Honours and awards ==
Poland

- Officer Cross of the Order of Polonia Restituta (15 September 2011)

== Family ==
Piotr Gliński is the younger brother of film director Robert Gliński.

== Select publications ==
- Civil society in the making (red.), IFiS PAN, Warszawa 2006
- Człowiek-środowisko-zdrowie. Problemy polskie z prognostycznego punktu widzenia (red.), KPPRK PAN, Warszawa 1985
- Katastrofa smoleńska, Reakcje społeczne, polityczne i medialne (red.), IFiS PAN, Warszawa 2011
- Kulturowe aspekty struktury społecznej. Fundamenty, konstrukcje, fasady (red.), IFiS PAN, Warszawa 2010
- Polscy Zieloni. Ruch społeczny w okresie przemian, IFiS PAN, Warszawa 1996
- Samoorganizacja społeczeństwa polskiego. III sektor i wspólnoty lokalne w jednoczącej się Europie (red.), IFiS PAN, Warszawa 2002
- Socjologia i Siciński. Style życia, społeczeństwo obywatelskie, studia nad przyszłością (red.), IFiS PAN, Warszawa 2009
- Społeczne aspekty ochrony i kształtowania środowiska w Polsce, Wyd. SGGW-AR, Warszawa 1990
- Style działań organizacji pozarządowych w Polsce. Grupy interesu czy pożytku publicznego?, IFiS PAN, Warszawa 2006
- Teorie wspólnotowe a praktyka społeczna. Obywatelskość, polityka, lokalność (red.), IFiS PAN, Warszawa 2005

== See also ==
- History of Poland (1989–present)
- List of political parties in Poland
- List of politicians in Poland
- Politics of Poland
- 2015 Polish presidential election
