= György Lengyel =

Hungarian sociologist (born 1951)

- Born: 1951 (age 74–75); Hungary

Academic background
- Education: Karl Marx University of Economic Sciences; Eötvös Loránd University

Academic work
- Discipline: Sociology
- Sub-discipline: Economic sociology, elite research
- Institutions: Corvinus University of Budapest

György Lengyel (born 1951) is a Hungarian economic sociologist and professor emeritus at Corvinus University of Budapest. He studies economic elites, entrepreneurs and economic institutions, with a focus on the transformation of elites in Central and Eastern Europe after state socialism. He was president of the Hungarian Sociological Association in 2006 and, with Richard Swedberg, founded the Economic Sociology research network of the European Sociological Association in 1995.

== Education and career ==
Lengyel studied economic planning and economic policy at the Karl Marx University of Economic Sciences in Budapest from 1970 to 1975, and later took degrees in history (1980) and sociology (1981) at Eötvös Loránd University. After three years as an archivist at the Budapest municipal archives, he joined the Karl Marx University in 1978 as a research fellow. He received the candidate of sciences degree from the Hungarian Academy of Sciences in 1991, habilitated in 1997 and was awarded the academy's Doctor of Sciences (DSc) title in 2007.

Lengyel was secretary of the economic sociology section of the Hungarian Sociological Association from 1989 to 1999 and its president in 2006, and he has been a member of the Sociology Committee of the Hungarian Academy of Sciences since 1993. He chaired the advisory board of the academy's Centre for Social Sciences from 2012 to 2015. Internationally, he was vice-chair of the International Sociological Association's research committee on economy and society from 1994 to 2002 and a member of the executive committee of the European Sociological Association from 1999 to 2001. In 1995 he and Richard Swedberg established the association's Economic Sociology research network, which he co-chaired until 1997.

Lengyel was secretary of the economic sociology section of the Hungarian Sociological Association from 1989 to 1999 and its president in 2006, and he has been a member of the Sociology Committee of the Hungarian Academy of Sciences since 1993.

== Research ==
Lengyel's research concerns economic elites, entrepreneurs, economic attitudes and institutions. From 1990 to 2003 he led a research programme on the transformation of the Hungarian economic elite, published in 2007 as A magyar gazdasági elit társadalmi összetétele a huszadik század végén (The social composition of the Hungarian economic elite at the end of the twentieth century), and from 1993 to 2002 he directed the Hungarian enterprise panel survey.

With the American political scientist John Higley he edited Elites after State Socialism: Theories and Analysis (2000), a collection of studies on the political and economic elites of Central and Eastern Europe and Russia after 1989. The editors' introduction proposed a typology of elites and regimes that the Hungarian sociologist András Csite, reviewing the book in Szociológiai Szemle, expected to be widely cited in later elite research. The book was reviewed by Archie Brown in Slavic Review and, critically, by Pete Glatter in Historical Materialism, who contrasted the confident framework of its introduction with the uncertainty of its conclusions.

He took part in the European comparative elite surveys of the IntUne and ENEC projects from 2007 and co-edited, with Heinrich Best and Luca Verzichelli, The Europe of Elites: A Study into the Europeanness of Europe's Political and Economic Elites (Oxford University Press, 2012), which examined how far national political and economic elites identified with European integration. In a 2015 interview with the Journal of Economic Sociology he described Hungarian economic sociology as pragmatic in orientation and increasingly internationalised, and argued that European integration had produced new social categories, such as supranational elites, that sociology had rarely studied.

== Honours ==
Lengyel held a Széchenyi Professorship from 1998 and received the Albert Szent-Györgyi Prize of the Hungarian education ministry in 2009 and the Róbert Angelusz Prize of the Hungarian Sociological Association in 2015.

== Selected works ==
- Higley, John; Lengyel, György, eds. (2000). Elites after State Socialism: Theories and Analysis. Lanham: Rowman & Littlefield. ISBN 0-8476-9896-3.
- Lengyel, György (2007). A magyar gazdasági elit társadalmi összetétele a huszadik század végén. Budapest: Akadémiai Kiadó.
- Best, Heinrich; Lengyel, György; Verzichelli, Luca, eds. (2012). The Europe of Elites: A Study into the Europeanness of Europe's Political and Economic Elites. Oxford: Oxford University Press. ISBN 978-0-19-960231-5.
