= Measures and Men =

Book by Witold Kula

- Author: Witold Kula
- Original title: Miary i ludzie
- Translator: Richard Szreter
- Language: Polish
- Published: 1970 (Państwowe Wydawnictwo Naukowe, in Polish); 1986 (Princeton University Press, in English)
- Media type: Print

Measures and Men (Polish: Miary i ludzie) is a book by Polish economic historian Witold Kula first published by Państwowe Wydawnictwo Naukowe (Warsaw) in 1970. It traces the evolution of measurement systems utilized by human communities within the broader context of historical economic development. The book draws primarily from metrological practices followed across Eastern European societies prior to the widespread adoption of the metric system in the eighteenth century.

Upon its translation into major European languages, including Spanish (1980), French (1984), and English (1986), the book has gained prominence as a major contribution in the field of history of measurement.

== Argument ==
The book examines multiple historical contexts through the lens of the measurement systems adopted by human communities, from traditional measures that developed in the context of menial labor and were hence largely subjective, to the objective metric system that emerged in late eighteenth-century France. In particular, Kula contests the widespread view of pre-metric measurement systems as lacking in precision and therefore suboptimal for economic transactions. Instead, as A. Hunter Dupree argued in his review for the Journal of Modern History, “instead of chaos and irrationality, [Kula] has found that weights and measures had representational and functional significance and levels of precision adequate to the tasks to which they were put”.

Kula employs the Marxist approach to the study of history and centers his discussion of measurement systems around the concept of class struggle. In a break with the body of scholarship that viewed measurements primarily as a historical source of merely factual interest, Kula contends that metrology is also a “medium of political conflict”.

== Reception ==
Fernand Braudel, a preeminent scholar of European economic history, noted on Kula's contributions in Afterthoughts on Material Civilization and Capitalism (1977):

"Witold Kula is one of the few who have not let their vision become obscured by the highs and lows of price curves and by the crises, the distant correlations, and the unifying trends of the market. [...] To use one of Kula's metaphors, one must keep looking down into the well, into the deepest water, down into material life".

As noted in a 2019 review, “there are few historical works touching on the history of economics and measurement which do not pay tribute to Kula on the first pages”. The list of scholars who cited or reported being influenced by the book includes, among others, Michael D. Gordin, Graeme Gooday and Kathryn Olesko.
