= Witold Kula =

Polish historian (1916–1988)

- Born: 18 April 1916; Warsaw, Government General of Warsaw
- Died: 12 February 1988 (aged 71); Warsaw, Poland
- Occupation: Historian

Academic background
- Education: University of Warsaw

Witold Kula (18 April 1916 – 12 February 1988) was a Polish historian, professor at the University of Warsaw.

== Biography ==
The son of Jan Kula „Żakiewicz” and Jadwiga née Liwska.

In 1934 he graduated in history from the University of Warsaw. In 1939 he obtained doctorate from the University of Warsaw. He obtained habilitation from the University of Łódź in 1947.

He was married to Nina Assorodobraj-Kula, and was father of Marcin Kula.

== Works ==
- Historia gospodarcza Polski w dobie popowstaniowej, 1864–1918. 1947.
- Kształtowanie się kapitalizmu w Polsce. 1955.
- Szkice o manufakturach w Polsce XVIII wieku. 1956.
- Rozważania o historii. 1958.
- Teoria ekonomiczna ustroju feudalnego. Próba modelu. 1962.
- Problemy i metody historii gospodarczej. 1963.
- Measures and Men. 1970.
- Historia, zacofanie, rozwój. 1983.
- Wokół historii. 1988.
- Dziennik czasów okupacji. 1994. Edited by Nina Assorodobraj-Kula and Marcin Kula.
- Rozdziałki. 1996.

=== Editions ===
- Listy emigrantów z Brazylii i Stanów Zjednoczonych 1890–1891. Warsaw. 1973. Co-edited with Nina Assorodobraj-Kula and Marcin Kula. Second edition: 2012.
