= Studia Socjologiczne =

- Discipline: Sociology
- Language: English, Polish
- Edited by: Jacek Wasilewski

Publication details
- History: 1961-present
- Publisher: Instytut Filozofii i Socjologii Polskiej Akademii Nauk w Warszawie; Komitet Socjologii PAN; Wydział Filozofii i Socjologii UW (Poland)
- Frequency: Quarterly
- Impact factor: 0.024 (2012)

Standard abbreviations
- ISO 4: Stud. Socjol.

Indexing
- ISSN: 0039-3371

Links
- Journal homepage

The Studia Socjologiczne (Sociological Studies) is a quarterly peer-reviewed academic journal co-published by the Polish Academy of Sciences (PAN Institute of Philosophy and Sociology and the PAN Committee on Sociology) and the University of Warsaw. It covers various areas of sociology. The journal publishes articles in Polish and since 2012, English.

== Abstracting and indexing ==
The journal was abstracted and indexed in the Social Sciences Citation Index up to 2012. According to the Journal Citation Reports, the journal has a 2012 impact factor of 0.024, ranking it 138th out of 139 journals in the category "Sociology".
