= Edward Czesak =

Polish politician

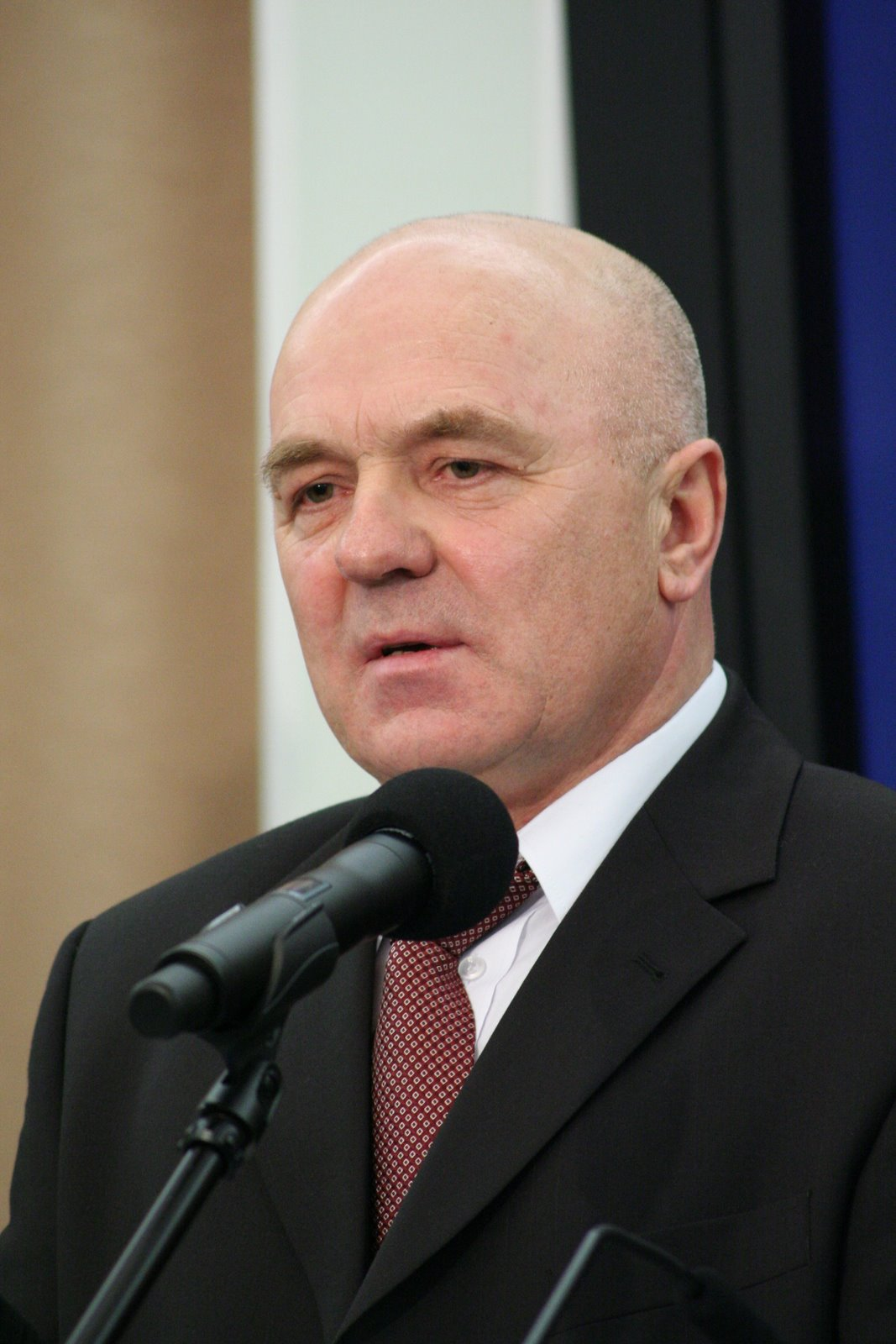

member of Sejm 2005-2007
- In office 25 September 2005 – ?

Personal details
- Born: 1951 (age 74–75)
- Party: Law and Justice

Edward Stanisław Czesak (born 22 February 1951 in Tarnów) is a Polish politician. He was elected to the Sejm on 25 September 2005, getting 7529 votes in 15 Tarnów district as a candidate from the Law and Justice list. He was elected in 2014 and currently serves as an MEP.

== See also ==
- Members of Polish Sejm 2005-2007
