= Marcin Kula =

Polish historian (born 1943)

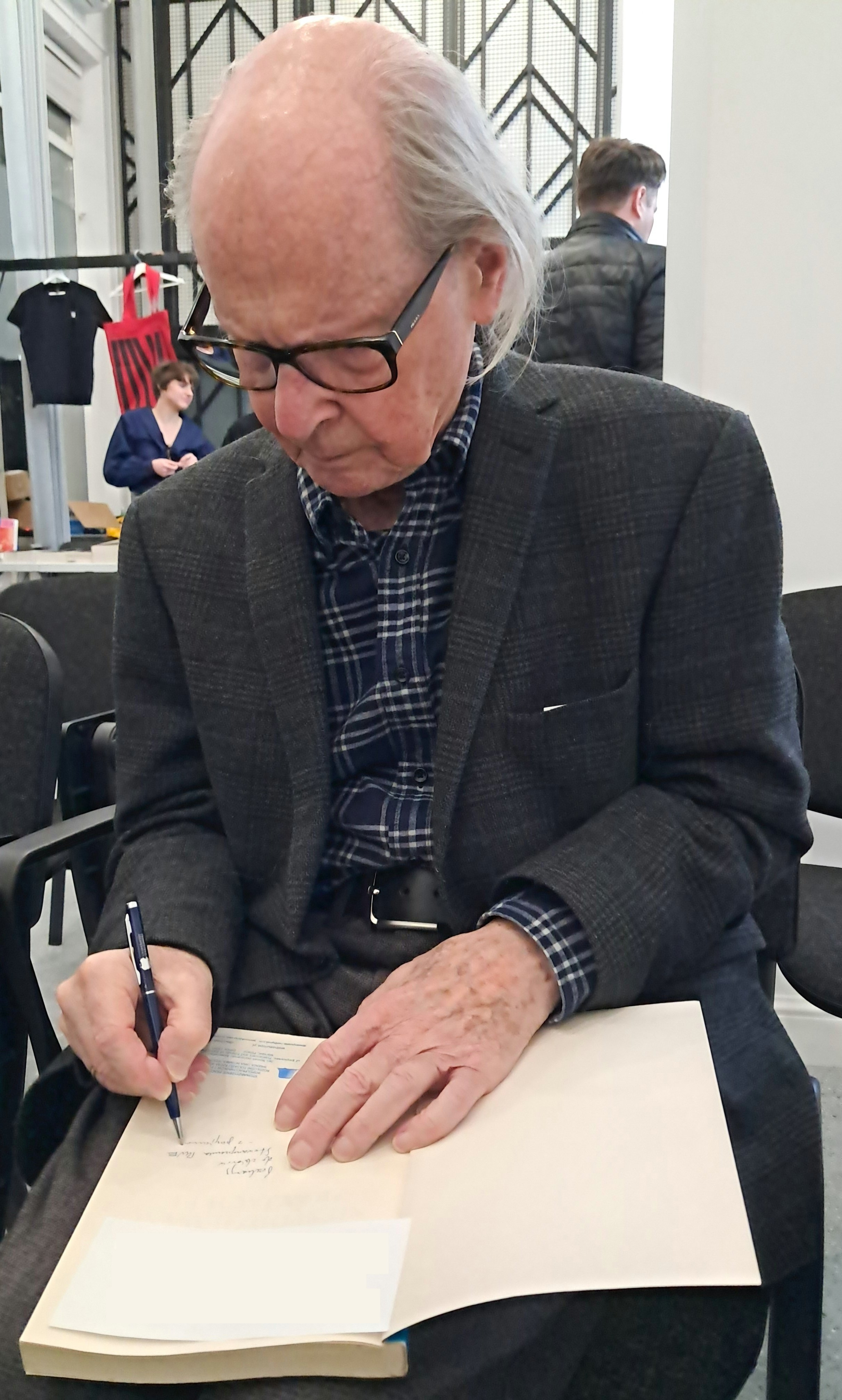
- Kula in 2025
- Born: 24 March 1943 (age 83); Warsaw, General Government
- Occupation: Historian

Academic background
- Education: University of Warsaw

Jan Marcin Kula (born 24 March 1943) is a Polish historian.

== Biography ==
The son of Witold Kula and Nina Assorodobraj-Kula.

In 1965 he graduated in history from the University of Warsaw. In 1967 he graduated from the same university in sociology. In 1968 he obtained doctorate at the Institute of History of the Polish Academy of Sciences. There, he obtained habilitation in 1976. From 1968 until 1990 he worked at the Institute of History of the Polish Academy of Sciences; from 1990 he worked at the University of Warsaw. He also worked as professor at the Aleksander Zelwerowicz National Academy of Dramatic Art.

He supervised nineteen doctoral dissertations. He was elected a member of the Polish Academy of Arts and Sciences (in 2019). He was a member of the Scientific Council of the Jewish Historical Institute.

== Works ==
- Początki czarnego niewolnictwa w Brazylii. Okres gospodarki cukrowej XVI – XVII w. 1970.
- Rewolucja 1933 na Kubie. 1978.
- Polonia brazylijska. 1981.
- Historia Brazylii. 1987.
- Narodowe i rewolucyjne. 1991.
- O Brazylii – ale też trochę o Polsce. 1992.
- Paryż, Londyn i Waszyngton patrzą na Październik 1956 r. w Polsce. 1992.
- Człowiek wojuje. 1994.
- Pod górkę do Europy. O Turcji lat trzydziestych – ale też trochę o dzisiejszej Polsce. 1994.
- Ludzie wśród ludzi: studenci Instytutu Historycznego UW o sobie, kolegach i nauczycielach. 1994.
- Niespodziewani przyjaciele, czyli rzecz o zwykłej ludzkiej solidarności. 1995.
- Anatomia Rewolucji Narodowej. Boliwia w XX wieku. 1999.
- Ekologia humanistyczna. 1999.
- Zupełnie normalna historia, czyli Dzieje Polski zanalizowane przez Marcina Kulę w krótkich słowach, subiektywnie, ku pożytkowi miejscowych i cudzoziemców. 2000.
- Przeszłość: spadek nie do odrzucenia. 2001.
- Zegarek historyka. 2001.
- Nośniki pamięci historycznej. 2002.
- Religiopodobny komunizm. 2003.
- Wybór tradycji. 2003.
- Krótki raport o użytkowaniu historii. 2004.
- Między przeszłością a przyszłością: o pamięci, zapominaniu i przewidywaniu. 2004.
- Uparta sprawa – żydowska? polska? ludzka?. 2004.
- Historia – moja miłość (z zastrzeżeniami). 2005.
- Komunizm i po komunizmie. 2006.
- Autoportret rodziny X. Fragment żydowskiej Warszawy lat międzywojennych. 2007.
- O co chodzi w historii?. 2008.
- Mimo wszystko: bliżej Paryża niż Moskwy: książka o Francji, PRL i o nas, historykach. 2010.
- Najpierw trzeba się urodzić. 2011.
- Naród, historia i... dużo kłopotów. 2011.
- Ostatecznie trzeba umrzeć. 2012.
- Polono-Brazylijczycy i parę kwestii im bliskich. 2012.
- Kartki z socjologii historycznej. 2014.
- Trzeba mieć pieniądze. Wykłady z socjologii historycznej. 2014.
- Trzeba pracować i produkować. Wykłady z socjologii historycznej. 2014.
- Trzeba jeść. Wykłady z socjologii historycznej. 2015.
- Trzeba mieszkać, myć się i ubierać. Wykłady z socjologii historycznej. 2015.
- Trzeba wydorośleć. Wykłady z socjologii historycznej. 2016.
- PZPR jako reżyser życia teatralnego w latach sześćdziesiątych. 2016.

=== Editions ===
- Listy emigrantów z Brazylii i Stanów Zjednoczonych 1890–1891. Warsaw. 1973. Co-edited with Nina Assorodobraj-Kula and Witold Kula. Second edition: 2012.
