= Archibald Brown =

Archibald or Archie Brown may refer to:

- Archibald Brown (architect) (1881–1956), American architect
- Archibald G. Brown (1844–1922), British minister
- Archie Brown (historian) (born 1938), British political scientist and historian
- Archie Brown (rugby) (1894–?), Welsh rugby player
- Archie Scott Brown (1927–1958), British racing driver
- Archie Brown (footballer) (born 2002), English footballer
- Archie Brown (union leader) (1911–1990), Communist activist in the trade union movement
- Arch Brown (1944–2018), Australian rugby league player
