= Krzysztof Konecki =

Polish professor

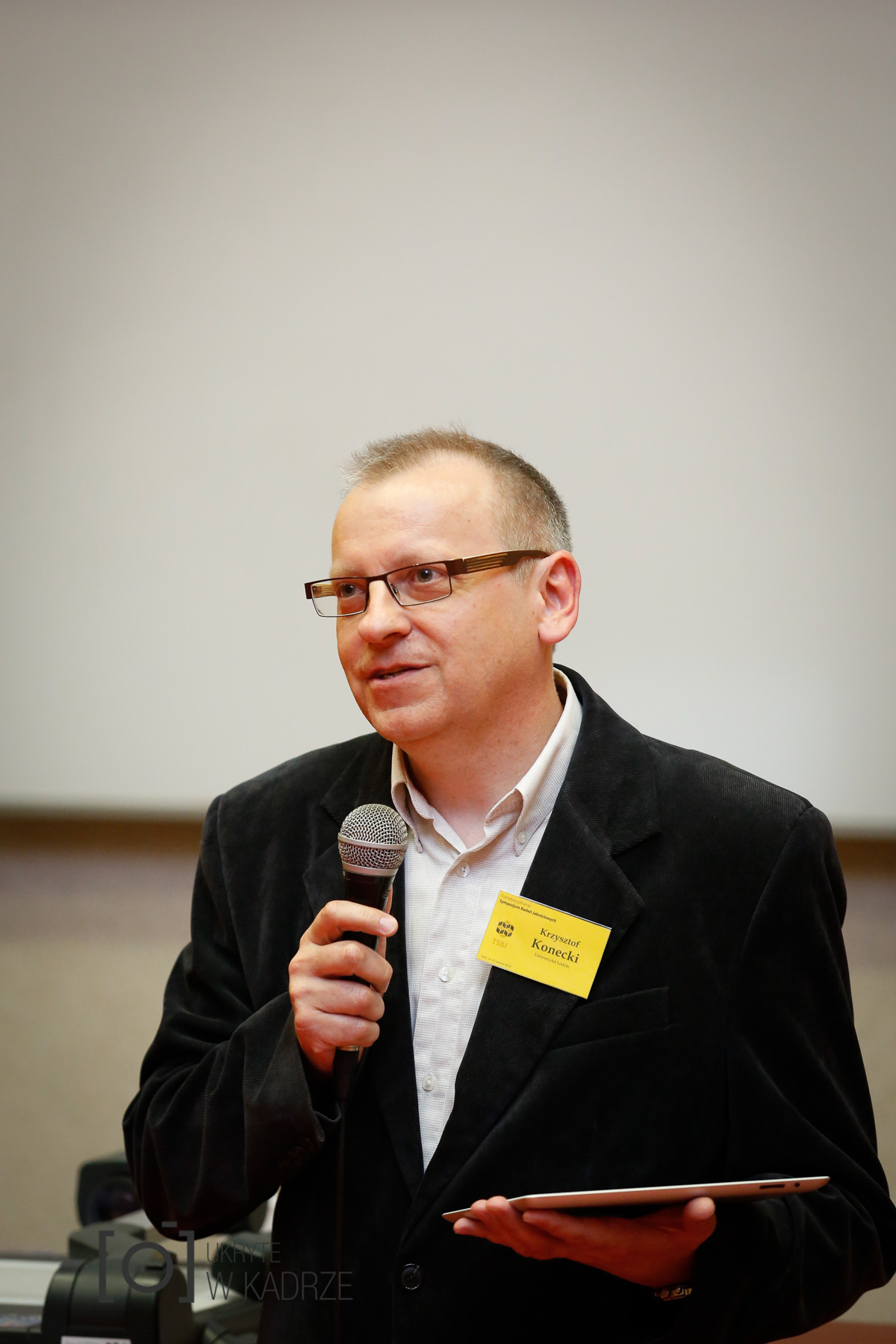

Krzysztof T. Konecki is a Polish sociologist, and professor at University of Łódź. He is the editor-in-chief of Qualitative Sociology Review, and is on the executive board of the Polish Sociological Association.

== Biography ==
Konecki's main theoretical and methodological inspirations stem from the works of Anselm Strauss, with whom he collaborated with while on a Fulbright scholarship at the University of California in the years 1994 – 1995.

He is a member of the Sociology Committee of Polish Academy of Sciences. From 2017 to 2023, he served as the president of the Polish Sociological Association, and from 2023 is on its executive board. His interests lie in qualitative sociology, symbolic interactionism, sociology of body, methodology of social sciences, visual sociology, communication and intercultural management, organizational culture and management, and contemplative sociology.

He has twice received the Stefan Nowak Award, in 2020 and 2021, for achievements in the field of methodology of social sciences and for innovative methodological research.
