= Józef Chałasiński =

Polish sociologist

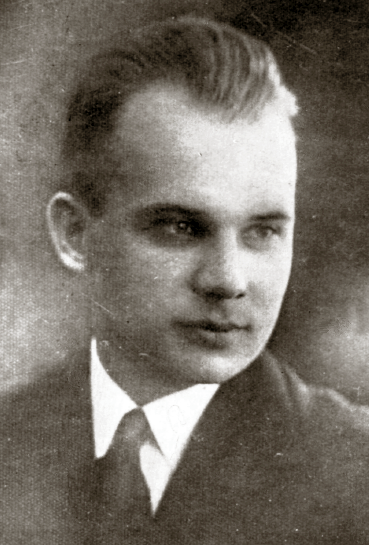
Jozef Chalasinski

Józef Chałasiński (17 February 1904 – 5 December 1979) was a Polish sociologist, academic and university professor.

He studied at the University of Poznań under the famous Polish sociologist, Florian Znaniecki, gaining a PhD in 1927. He joined the faculty of the University of Warsaw in 1935. Since 1945 he became involved with the University of Łódź (from which he received an honorary doctorate). Member of the Polish Academy of Sciences, founding member of the Polish Sociological Association, guest lecturer at the University of California (in 1958), he retired in 1974 and died in 1979.

== Awards ==
For his work he received several awards, such as Polonia Restituta and Cross of Merit.

== Works ==
A major figure in the Łodź school of sociology, and an editor of several Polish sociological journals. He was seen as the follower of Znaniecki. He studied life and careers of workers and peasants, and compared Polish education, culture and science to their American counterparts.
