= Władysław Markiewicz =

Polish sociologist

Władysław Markiewicz (2 January 1920 – 18 January 2017) was a Polish sociologist; professor of Adam Mickiewicz University in Poznań since 1966, and Warsaw University since 1972, director of the Western Institute (Instytut Zachodni) in Poznań in years 1966–1973, member of Polish Academy of Sciences (Polska Akademia Nauk, PAN) since 1972. He was the Polish-side Chairman of German-Polish Textbook Commission from 1972 to 1984.

He was a secretary of the Social Sciences Division of the Polish Academy of Sciences (Wydział Nauk Społecznych PAN) since 1972, editor-in-chief of Studia Socjologiczne (Sociological Studies) quarterly since 1972, chairman of the Poland 2000 Committee (Komitet Polska 2000 PAN) since 1980. From 1969 until 1972, he was the president of the Polish Sociological Association.

== Areas of activity ==
His main areas of interest are: sociology of labour and industry, sociology of the nation, sociology of the political relations.

== Publications ==
- Przeobrażenia świadomości narodowej reemigrantów polskich z Francji (Evolution of the national consciousness of the Polish reemigrants from France)
- Społeczne procesy uprzemysłowienia, 1962 (Social processes of industrialization)
- Społeczeństwo i socjologia w NRF, 1966 (Society and sociology in West Germany)
- Socjologia a słuzba społeczna, 1972 (Sociology and public service)
- Stan i perspektywy rozwoju nauk humanistycznych, 1973 (The state and prospects of development of the humanist sciences)
- Przemiany w strukturze społecznej Polski Ludowej, 1982 (Social structure changes in the People's Poland)
