= Stefan Czarnowski =

Polish sociologist

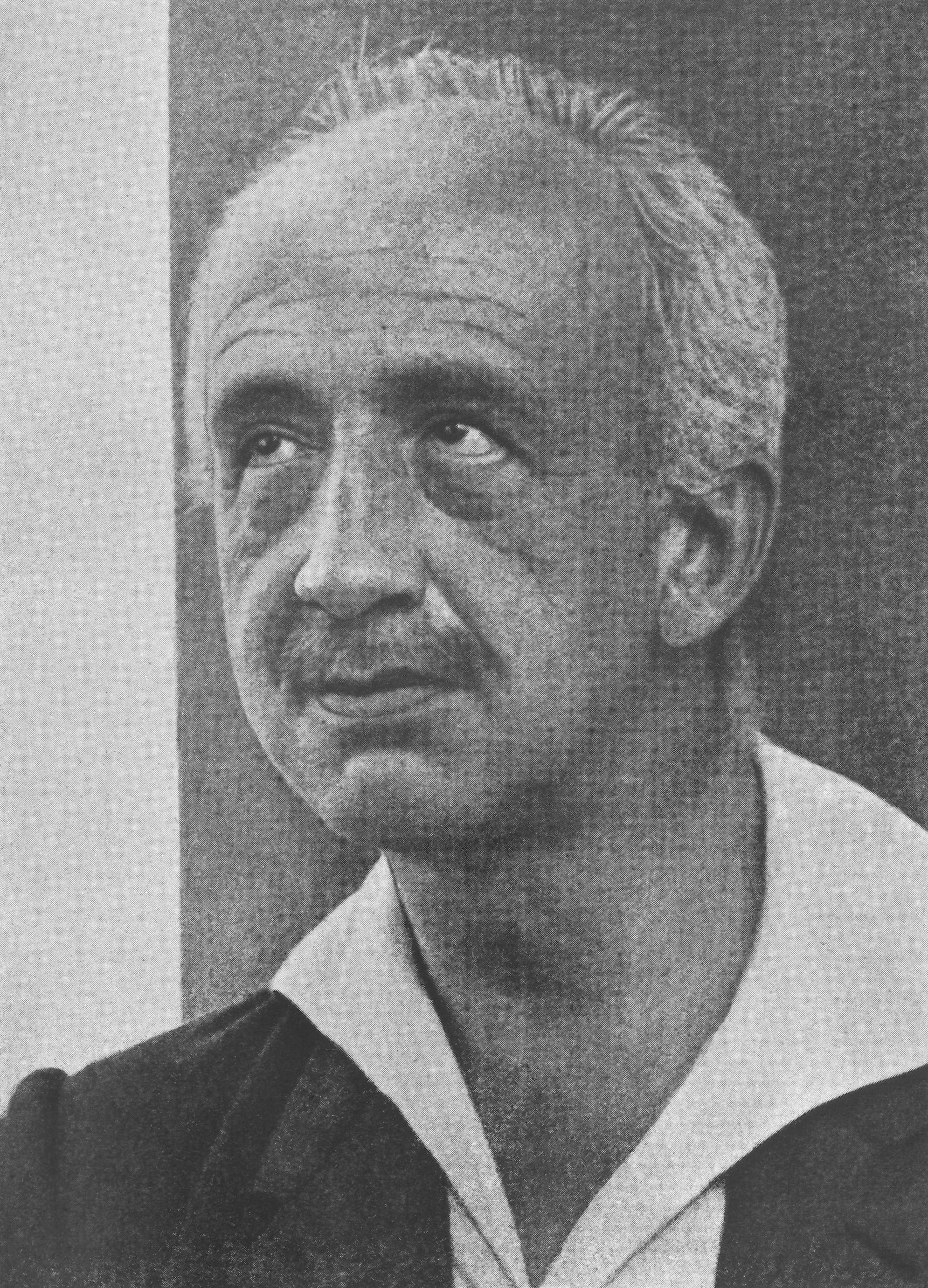
- Photograph in his book Kultura
- Born: 1 September 1879
- Died: 29 December 1937 (aged 58)

Academic background
- Education: University of Warsaw
- Academic advisors: Marcel Mauss, Henri Hubert

Academic work
- Discipline: Sociologist
- Institutions: University of Warsaw
- Main interests: Sociology of culture and religion, folklore
- Notable works: Kultura
- Military career
- Allegiance: Poland
- Service: Polish Legions
- Conflicts: Polish-Soviet War

Stefan Zygmunt Czarnowski (1 September 1879 – 29 December 1937) was a Polish sociologist, folklorist and professor of the University of Warsaw.

== Biography ==
Czarnowski was a member of the Polish pro-independence movements, he fought in the Polish Legions and the Polish-Soviet War. At first supporter of endecja, he gravitated towards supporting Polish Socialist Party.

After studies in Leipzig under figures such as Wilhelm Wundt, in Berlin with Georg Simmel and in Paris as a student and assistant to Marcel Mauss and Henri Hubert, Czarnowski habilitated in 1926 for cultural history at the University of Warsaw, 1928 to 1929 he lectured at the École pratique des hautes études in Paris. From 1930 he taught at the University of Warsaw as an associate professor of cultural history, from 1934 as a full professor of sociology and cultural history.

In his sociological work, Czarnowski closely followed Émile Durkheim's positivist concept of science, in which he researched the socio-cultural world using empirically verifiable theories and methods. At the same time he advocated an "ontological" humanism in the view that this world is a dimension constituted by symbolic communication, to be observed separately from natural phenomena. In most of his work, he appeared simultaneously as a historian and sociologist, which is why he is considered the first Polish representative of historical sociology. His main work Kultura offers a series of historical-sociological studies on the emergence, transformation and renewal of culture and is an attempt at a synthesis of Durkheim's concept of society and Marxist categories of analysis.

His works centered on sociology of culture and religion. He studied social movements, theory of heroes as well as history of the Celts.

He wrote in French a very important book: Le culte des héros et ses conditions sociales; Saint Patrick, héros national de l'Irlande, Paris, Félix Alcan, Collection des travaux sociologiques sous la direction d'Emile Durkheim, Préface d'Henri Hubert, 1919.

His doctoral students included Nina Assorodobraj-Kula.
