= Polish Sociological Association =

Professional sociologists organization

The Polskie Towarzystwo Socjologiczne (PTS) (Polish Sociological Association) is the main professional organization of sociologists in Poland. The PTS defines its mission as "supporting the development of sociology and popularizing sociological knowledge within society".

Currently the organization states to have approx. 1,000 members, out of which the majority are employed by universities or research institutions. Full membership requires a degree in sociology, a related discipline, or any other discipline if the applicant has an established body of work in sociology. Undergraduate students and may register as associated members. Honorary members include James Samuel Coleman and Shmuel Eisenstadt.

Its seat is in Warsaw with regional offices in Białystok, Gdańsk, Katowice, Kraków, Lublin, Łódź, Opole, Poznań, Rzeszów, Szczecin, Toruń, Wrocław, and Zielona Góra.

The PTS publishes the quarterly English-language Polish Sociological Review (entitled Polish Sociological Bulletin from its inception in 1961 until 1993, and "Bibliographical Information"). It also organizes the Polish Sociologocial Convention (Ogólnopolski Zjazd Socjologiczny) in irregular intervals that average about three years.

The PTS also operates a research institute offering social research services to public and private clients (Zakład Badań Naukowych PTS). The proceeds from its work contribute to the PTS budget.

== History ==
In its present form, the PTS has had a continuous existence since 1956, but its history can be traced back to 1927, when Florian Znaniecki established the first Polish organization of sociologists under the name of "Polish Sociological Institute" (Polski Instytut Socjologiczny/PIS). Initially, the PIS combined the tasks of a research institute with the representation of sociologists across the country. In 1931, on the first ever national convention of sociologists in Poznań, separate professional organization under the name of Polskie Towarzystwo Socjologiczne (PTS) was created on Znaniecki's initiative. This association, one of the first of its type in Europe, co-existed with the PIS. Relatively little is known about its activities. Its first two presidents were Ludwik Krzywicki (1931-1935) and Stefan Czarnowski (1935-1938). In 1935, PTS and PIS jointly organized the second Polish Sociologocial Convention in Warsaw. Both bodies existed until the outbreak of World War II in 1939. Towards the end of the war, in 1944 the PIS was reactivated in the Soviet-controlled part of the country, but not so the PTS; some of its previous tasks were reassigned to the new PIS. In 1951, sociology was declared a "bourgeois" science in Poland. All sociological university departments and institutes, including the PIS, were closed, their employees transferred to neighbouring disciplines such as philosophy or history.

After sociology had been readmitted to academic life in Poland in 1956, a group of sociologists at the universities of Warsaw and Łódź around Stanisław Ossowski set up a Sociological Section within the Polish Philosophical Association (Polskie Towarzystwo Filozoficzne), which became a member of the International Sociological Association (ISA) (of which Ossowski had already been a founding member in 1949). The following year, the section transformed into an independent body, adopting the traditional name Polskie Towarzystwo Socjologiczne. Ossowski was elected its first president, other founding board members included Nina Assorodobraj, Józef Chałasiński, Antonina Kłoskowska, Jan Lutyński, Stefan Nowak, Zygmunt Pióro, Jan Strzelecki and Jan Szczepański.

During the time of communist rule in Poland, while academic life was highly formalized, hierarchically structured, and subject to political pressure, the PTS remained fully autonomous from government intervention, making it an attractive venue for unrestricted scholarly as well as political debate. However, lack of government support also constituted a constant problem for the organizational work of the PTS; e.g., the first post-war national convention did not take place until 1965.

== Conventions ==
The first convention had the title I Konferencja Socjologów Polskich ("1st conference of Polish sociologist"), the second II Zjazd Socjologów Polskich ("2nd convention of Polish sociologists"). From the third event onwards, the title has been Ogólnopolski Zjazd Socjologiczny ("All-Polish sociological convention"), with the addition of a vaguely defined overarching topic for papers and sessions as stated below.

- (I) 1931, Poznań - I Konferencji Socjologów Polskich
- (II) 1935, Warsaw - II Zjazd Socjologów Polskich
- (III) 1965, Warsaw - Obraz zmian w społeczeństwie polskim pod wpływem industrializacji i nowego ustroju ("Changes in Polish society under the influence of industrialization and the new system")
- (IV) 1969, Poznań - Teoria i badania socjologiczna a praktyka społeczna ("Sociological theory and research and societal practice")
- (V) 1977, Kraków - Rozwój społeczeństwa polskiego a socjologia ("The development of Polish society and sociology")
- (VI) 1981, Łódź - Socjologia polska wobec problemów społecznych kraju ("Polish sociology faced with the country's problems")
- (VII) 1986, Wrocław - Ziemie Odzyskane procesy integracji społecznej ("The Recovered Territories in the process of social integration", title of the inaugural session)
- (VIII) 1990, Toruń - Przełom i wyzwania. Teorie zmiany społecznej wobec wyzwań współczesności ("Fundamental change und its challenges. Theories of social change faced with the challenges of the present")
- (IX) 1994, Lublin - Ludzie i instytucje. Stawanie się ładu społecznego ("People and institutions. The development of social order")
- (X) 1997, Katowice - Śląsk Polska Europa. Zmieniające się społeczeństwo w perspektywie lokalnej i globalnej ("Silesia, Poland, Europe: Changing society in local and global perspective")
- (XI) 2000, Rzeszów - Los i wybór. Dziedzictwo i perspektywy społeczeństwa polskiego.
- (XII) 2004, Poznań - Społeczne aspekty wstąpienia Polski do Unii Europejskiej ("Social aspects of Poland's accession to the European Union")
- (XIII) 2006, Zielona Góra - Co nas łączy, co nas dzieli? ("What Associates Us, What Differentiates Us")
- (XIV) 2010, Kraków - Co się dzieje ze społeczeństwem? ("What happens to society?")
- (XV) 2013, Szczecin - Co po kryzysie? ("What after the crisis?")
- (XVI) 2016, Gdańsk - Solidarność w czasach nieufności ("Solidarity in times of distrust")
- (XVII) 2019, Wrocław - Ja, my oni? Podmiotowość, tożsamość, przynależność ("Me, us, them? Subjectivity, identity, belonging")
- (XVIII) 2022, Warsaw - Społeczeństwo przyszłości: rekompozycje ("Society of the future: recompositions")
- (XIX) 2025, Białystok - Ryzyka oswojone? Wyzwania współczesności ("Tamed risks? Contemporary challenges")

== Sections ==
The PTS currently has 15 sections dedicated to various subfields of sociology. Members can enroll in more than one section.

- Sekcja Socjologii Pracy (Industrial sociology)
- Sekcja Socjologii Wsi i Rolnictwa (Rural sociology)
- Sekcja Socjologii Nauki (Sociology of science)
- Sekcja Socjologii Dewiacji i Kontroli Społecznej (Sociology of deviance)
- Sekcja Socjologii Miasta (Urban sociology)
- Sekcja Antropologii Społecznej (Social anthropology)
- Sekcja Metodologii Badań Społecznych (Methodology of social research)
- Sekcja Socjologii Jakościowej i Symbolicznego Interakcjonizmu (Qualitative research and Symbolic interactionism)
- Sekcja Socjologicznych Problemów Bezpieczeństwa Narodowego (formerly Sekcja Socjologii Wojska) (Military sociology)
- Sekcja Socjologii Medycyny (Medical sociology)
- Sekcja Pracy Socjalnej (Sociology of social work)
- Sekcja Socjotechniki (Social engineering)
- Sekcja Socjologii Prawa (Sociology of law)
- Sekcja Socjologii Religii (Sociology of religion)
- Sekcja Historii Socjologii (History of sociology)
- Sekcja Kół Naukowych PTS ("Scholarly circles of the Polish Sociological Association")
- Sekcja Socjologii Młodzieży i Edukacji (Sociology of youth and education)

== Presidents ==
Since its inception, the PSA had a number of presidents. They were, in chronological order:

- 1957–1963 Stanisław Ossowski
- 1964–1968 Nina Assorodobraj
- 1969–1972 Władysław Markiewicz
- 1972–1976 Jerzy Szacki
- 1976–1983 Stefan Nowak
- 1983–1989 Janusz Ziółkowski
- 1989–1994 Antonina Kłoskowska
- 1994–1998 Antoni Sułek
- 1998–2002 Andrzej Kojder
- 2002–2005 Włodzimierz Wesołowski
- 2005–2010 Piotr Gliński
- 2010–2017 Grażyna Skąpska
- 2017–2023 Krzysztof T. Konecki
- 2023–present Mirosława Grabowska
