= Corruption in China =

Corruption has been a significant problem in the People's Republic of China. Like other socialist economies that have undertaken economic reforms, such as post-Soviet Eastern Europe and Central Asia, reform-era China has experienced increasing levels of corruption. In Transparency International's 2025 Corruption Perceptions Index (CPI), China ranked 76th out of 182 countries, with a score of 43 out of 100. The Unbundled Corruption Index (UCI), which distinguishes among different types of corruption, shows that when compared to other developing countries, corruption in China is dominated by "access money" (elite exchanges of power and wealth), rather than petty bribery or extortion.

Public surveys on the mainland since the late 1980s have shown that corruption is among the top concerns of the general public. According to Yan Sun, Associate Professor of Political Science at the City University of New York, it was cadre corruption, rather than a demand for democracy as such, that lay at the root of the social dissatisfaction that led to the 1989 Tiananmen Square protests and massacre. Corruption undermines the legitimacy of the authoritarian Chinese Communist Party (CCP) government, adds to economic inequality, undermines the environment, and fuels social unrest.

Since the 1989 Tiananmen Square protests and massacre, corruption has not slowed as a result of greater economic freedom, but instead has grown more entrenched and severe in its character and scope. In popular perception, there are more dishonest CCP officials than honest ones, a reversal of the views held in the first decade of the reform and opening up period of the 1980s. Chinese political scientist Minxin Pei argued in 2007 that failure to contain widespread corruption is among the most serious threats to China's future economic and political stability. He estimated that year that bribery, kickbacks, theft, and the waste of public funds cost at least three percent of GDP.

By the 2000s and early 2010s, corruption had grown to be an extensive problem, impacting government administration, armed forces, law enforcement, healthcare and education. CCP cadre corruption in China has been subject to significant media attention since CCP General Secretary Xi Jinping announced his anti-corruption campaign following the CCP's 18th National Congress, which was held in November 2012. Many high-ranking government and military officials have been found guilty of corruption because of this campaign. According to analysts Neil Thomas and Wang Shengyu, the campaign also led to an overall decrease in petty bribery and open embezzlement. According to the World Bank's Worldwide Governance Indicators, China has advanced under Xi on metrics of "control of corruption" and "government effectiveness", moving from around the same as other upper-middle-income countries to well above the average. Other academics have found that recent anti-corruption campaigns have increased the value of personal connections and driven a rise in other forms of corruption. Writing in 2024, academic Lan Xiaohuan states that China exhibits relatively little petty corruption compared with other developing countries.

== History ==
=== Imperial China ===
The spread of corruption in traditional China is often connected to the Confucian concept of renzhi (人治; rénzhì; 'Rule of the people') as opposed to the legalist "rule of law" (法治; Fǎzhì). Profit was despised as a preoccupation of the base people, while the true Confucians were supposed to be guided in their actions by the moral principle of justice (义; 義; yì).

Another kind of corruption came about in Tang China, developed in connection with the imperial examination system.

In the late Ming dynasty, robust international trade brought an influx of silver into China, enriching merchants and becoming a target of government officials. In the early 1600s, literary works like The Book of Swindles created typologies of fraud, including categories such as "Government Underlings" and "Corruption in Education."

=== Republic of China ===
The widespread corruption of the Kuomintang, the Chinese Nationalist Party, is often credited as being an important component in the defeat of the KMT by the CCP's People's Liberation Army. Though the Nationalist Army was initially better equipped and had superior numbers, the KMT's rampant corruption damaged its popularity, limited its support base, and helped the communists in their propaganda war.

== People's Republic of China ==
Getting high-quality, reliable, and standardized survey data on the severity of corruption in the PRC is enormously difficult. However, a variety of sources can still be tapped, which "present a sobering picture," according to Minxin Pei, an academic with expertise on Chinese affairs.

Official deviance and corruption have taken place at both the individual and unit levels since the founding of the PRC. Initially, the practices had much to do with the danwei (simplified Chinese: 单位; traditional Chinese: 單位; pinyin: dān wèi) (literally, "unit") system, an outgrowth of communist wartime organs. In the PRC, the reform and opening up policy of Deng Xiaoping were much criticized for making corruption the price of economic development. Corruption during Mao's reign also existed, however.

Emergence of the private sector inside the state economy in post-Mao China has tempted CCP members to misuse their power in government posts; the powerful economic levers in the hands of the elite have propelled the sons of some party officials to the most profitable positions. For this, the CCP has been called the "princelings' party" (Chinese: 太子党; pinyin: taizidang), a reference to nepotistic corruption in some periods of Imperial China. The relatives of several prominent political leaders are reported to have generated large personal wealth in business, including relatives of former Premier Wen Jiabao, current CCP general secretary Xi Jinping, and former Chongqing party secretary Bo Xilai. Attacking corruption in the CCP was one of the forces behind the 1989 Tiananmen Square protests and massacre.

The politically unchallenged regime in China creates opportunities for cadres to exploit and control the rapid growth of economic opportunities, and while incentives to corruption grow, effective countervailing forces are absent.

Both structural and non-structural corruption has been prevalent in China. Non-structural corruption exists around the world, and refers to all activities that can be clearly defined as "illegal" or "criminal," mainly including different forms of graft: embezzlement, extortion, bribery, etc. Structural corruption arises from particular economic and political structures; this form is difficult to root out without a change in the broader system.

Weak state institutions are being blamed for worsening corruption in reform-era China. New Left scholars on China criticize the government for its apparent "blind faith" in the market, and especially for its erosion of authority and loss of control of local agencies and agents since 1992. Others also see strong links between institutional decline and rising corruption. Corruption in China results from the Party-State's inability to maintain a disciplined and effective administrative corps, according to Lü Xiaobo, Assistant Professor of Political Science at Barnard College. The Chinese reform-era state has also been an enabling factor, since state agencies have been granted regulatory power without institutional constraints, allowing them to tap into new opportunities to seek profits from the rapid growth in businesses and the economy. This takes place at both the departmental and individual levels. Corruption here is part of the dilemma faced by any reforming socialist state, where the state needs to play an active role in creating and regulating markets, while at the same time its own intervention places extra burdens on administrative budgets. Instead of being able to reduce the size of its bureaucratic machinery (and therefore opportunities for corruption), it is instead pressed to expand further. Officials then cash in on the regulatory power by "seeking rents."

However, not all forms of corruption are uncontrolled. Yuen Yuen Ang's research shows that although bribery increased sharply from the 2000s onward, other predatory forms of corruption—such as embezzlement and misuse of public funds—declined simultaneously. Moreover, methods of bribery have become more sophisticated.

In 2010, in a rare move prompted by concerns over stability, Li Jinhua, vice-chairman of the National Committee of the Chinese People's Political Consultative Conference (NCCPPCC) and former long-serving auditor general of the National Audit Office, issued a warning in the People's Daily, calling for better legal structures and greater supervision over the business dealings of officials and their children. He said the rapidly growing wealth of CCP officials' children and family members "is what the public is most dissatisfied about".

According to a January 2014 investigation by the International Consortium of Investigative Journalists, more than a dozen family members of China's top political and military leaders are linked to offshore companies based in the British Virgin Islands. The report shows that the brother-in-law of China's current paramount leader, Xi Jinping, and the son-in-law of former premier Wen Jiabao are among those using offshore financial havens to avoid tax and transfer money overseas. The Golden Shield Project has blocked foreign news sites that have reported on the scandal.

Among the targets of the anti-corruption campaign since 2012 are Yao Gang, Vice-chairman at the China Securities Regulatory Commission (CSRC), China's top security regulator. He was investigated by the Central Commission for Discipline Inspection in November 2015, after a stock market rout rocked global markets.

A 2022 study by researchers at the University of Navarra and the University of Manchester suggested that certain forms of corruption increased under the general secretaryship of Xi Jinping. In particular, corruption involving CCP cadres and so-called "political scammers" has increased.

The campaign has also led to an overall decrease in petty bribery and open embezzlement. According to the World Bank's Worldwide Governance Indicators, China has advanced under Xi on metrics of "control of corruption" and "government effectiveness", moving from around the same as other upper-middle-income countries to well above the average. According to one study, the campaign led to stronger environmental protection, leading air pollution at the city-level to decrease by around 20.3 percent. Another study showed that companies lost some of the political protection that protected them from punishment for environment. The anti-corruption campaign also helped reduce corruption during the battle against poverty that was launched in 2015, with research suggesting that in normally corruption-prone counties, the anti-corruption campaign helped increase poor households' incomes and reduced poverty by decreasing state expropriation and limiting households' exclusion from transfer payments and formal credit from state financial institutions. In research and development spending, the campaign led to lowered corruption in the allocation of resources, making them "more merit-based and more likely to flow to firms that later produced stronger innovation outcomes".

=== Commentary ===
Melanie Manion, an expert on China's corruption, argues that Xi's anti-corruption campaign has been distinct from previous campaign in that it features institutionalization and credible commitments to good governance, and that it has been the longest campaign with the most far-reaching impact. The enhancement of the power of the CCDI led to streamlining or severing dual rule at the expense of horizontal leadership by the local authorities, and the campaign has significantly reduced rent-seeking opportunities, as thousands (or tens of thousands at the local levels) of regulations required for doing business before 2012 have been abolished compared. Removals of the structural incentives also impacted corruption. Writing in 2024, academic Lan Xiaohuan states that China exhibits relatively little petty corruption compared with other developing countries.

=== Public perceptions ===
Opinion surveys of CCP officials and Chinese citizens identify corruption as one of the public's top concerns. Every year, researchers at the Central Party School, the CCP organ that trains senior and midlevel officials, survey over 100 officials at the school. Between 1999 and 2004, respondents ranked corruption as either the most serious or the second most serious social problem. Similarly, in late 2006, the State Council's Development Research Center asked 4,586 business executives (87 percent in nonstate firms) to rate their local officials in terms of integrity. Almost one-quarter said that their local officials were "bad"; 12 percent said they were "very bad." A Harvard University study of more than 30,000 Chinese found that in 2016, 65% of respondents believed that local officials were not corrupt, an improvement from 35% in 2011.

Official corruption is among the populace's greatest gripes against the regime. According to Yan Sun, "If the Party executes every official for corruption, it will overdo a little; but if the Party executes every other official for corruption, it cannot go wrong." In contemporary China, bribery has become so entrenched that one party secretary in a poor county received repeated death threats for rejecting over 600,000 Renminbi in bribes during his tenure. In 1994, in another area officially designated "impoverished," a delegation of the UN Food and Agriculture Organization arrived for a development conference, but upon seeing rows of imported luxury cars outside the conference site, asked the local officials, "Are you really poor?" A rare online opinion poll in 2010 by the People's Daily found that 91% of respondents believe all rich families in China have political backgrounds.

==== International rankings ====
In Transparency International's 2025 Corruption Perceptions Index, which scored 182 countries on a scale from 0 ("highly corrupt") to 100 ("very clean"), China scored 43. When ranked by score, China ranked 76th among the 182 countries in the Index, where the country ranked first is perceived to have the most honest public sector. For comparison with regional scores, the best score among those countries of the Asia Pacific region that appeared in the Index (Note: Afghanistan, Australia, Bangladesh, Bhutan, Brunei Darussalam, Cambodia, China, Fiji, Hong Kong, India, Indonesia, Japan, North Korea, South Korea, Laos, Malaysia, Maldives, Mongolia, Myanmar, Nepal, New Zealand, Pakistan, Papua New Guinea, Philippines, Singapore, Solomon Islands, Sri Lanka, Taiwan, Thailand, Timor-Leste, Vanuatu, Vietnam) was 84, the average score was 45 and the worst score was 15. For comparison with worldwide scores, the best score was 89 (ranked 1), the average score was 42, and the worst score was 9 (ranked 181, in a two-way tie).

The 2018 through 2022 Corruption Perceptions Index scores showed decreasing corruption in China, and in 2021 and 2022, for the first time, China had less perceived corruption than the average country; that is, China's 2021–22 score of 45 was higher than the average score of 43 in those years. China's 2025 score of 43 was also higher than the average score that year of 42.

=== Means ===
Broadly defined, three types of corruption are common in China: graft, rent-seeking, and prebendalism.

Graft is the most common and refers to bribery, illicit kickbacks, embezzlement, and the theft of public funds. Graft involves something of value given to, and accepted by, public officials for dishonest or illegal purposes. It includes officials who spend fraudulently or use public funds for their own benefit.

Rent-seeking refers to all forms of corrupt behavior by individuals with monopolistic power. Public officials, through granting licenses or monopolies to their clients, obtain "rents"—additional earnings as a result of a restricted market. Rent-seeking happens when officials grant rents to those in their favor. This is akin to cronyism. In the Chinese case, public officials are both rent-generators and rent-seekers, both making rent opportunities for others and seeking such opportunities to benefit themselves. This may include profiteering by officials or official firms, extortion in the form of illicit impositions, fees, and other charges.

Prebendalism is the practice whereby holders of public office gain privileges and perquisites through their positions. Controlling an office entitles the holder to rents or payments for real or fake activities, and organizations are turned from places of work into "resource banks" where individuals and groups pursue their own interests. Prebendal corruption doesn't necessarily need to be about monetary gain, but may include usurpation of official privilege, backdoor deals, clientelism, cronyism, and nepotism.

Corruption in the PRC has developed in two major ways. In the first mode, corruption is in the form of ostensibly legal official expenditure, but is actually wasteful and directed toward private benefits. For example, the increasing number of local governments are building massive administrative office buildings that resemble luxurious mansions. At the same time, many corrupt local officials have turned their jurisdictions into virtual "mafia states," where they collude with criminal elements and unsavory businessmen in illegal activities. In the People's Liberation Army (PLA), corruption took the form of senior posts and promotions being sold and those in positions of authority soliciting bribes from military contractors and businesses involving PLA-controlled real estate.

While the state and its bureaucrats are major players in the reform-era economy, new interests and concentrations of economic power have been created, without legitimate channels between administrators and entrepreneurs. A lack of regulation and supervision has meant these roles are not clearly demarcated (Lü Xiaobo, in his text, titles one section "From Apparatchiks to Entrepreneurchiks"). Illicit guandao enterprises, formed by networks of bureaucrats and entrepreneurs, are allowed to grow, operating behind the façade of agencies or state-owned enterprises, in a realm neither fully public nor fully private. More recently, Ben Hillman has shown how official intrastate patronage networks facilitate corruption. According to Hillman, patronage networks 'grease the wheels' of a dysfunctional bureaucracy while simultaneously extracting spoils for the private benefit of their members. Patronage networks also protect transgressors from intrusion by the Party-state's disciplinary agencies. Hillman's study of patronage networks helps to explain how corruption and economic development have been able to coexist in China.

The PLA has also become a major economic player and a participant in large- and small-scale corruption. Inconsistent tax policy and a politicized and poorly organized banking system create ample opportunities for favoritism, kickbacks, and "outright theft," according to Michael Johnston, Professor of Political Science at Colgate University in Hamilton, New York.

Corruption has also taken the form of collusion between CCP officials and criminal gangs. Often hidden inside legitimate businesses, gangs had infiltrated public offices and worked closely with the police. The Daily Telegraph quoted an employee of a state company saying: "In fact, the police stations in Chongqing were actually the centre of the prostitution, gambling and drugs rackets. They would detain gangsters from time to time, and sometimes send them to prison, but the gangsters described it as going away for a holiday. The police and the mafia were buddies." In some cases, innocents were hacked to death by roaming gangs whose presence was allowed by regime officials, according to The Daily Telegraph.

Some officials have been complicit in sex trafficking in China.

==== Housing ====
China's housing boom and the shift of central government policy towards social housing are providing officials with more ways to siphon off properties for personal gain. The Financial Times cites several public scandals involving local officials in 2010: for example, in a province in eastern China, a complex of 3,500 apartments designated as social housing in Rizhao, Shandong, was sold to local officials at prices 30-50 per cent below market values. It said in Meixian, Shaanxi, that around 80 percent of the city's first social housing development, called Urban Beautiful Scenery, went to local officials. In Xinzhou, Shanxi, a new complex of 1,578 apartments on the local government's list of designated social housing was almost entirely reserved for local officials, many of whom were 'flipped' for tidy profits even before construction was completed. Jones Lang LaSalle said that transparency about plans for affordable housing was severely lacking.

==== Welfare ====
In October 2025, Sichuan authorities reported that 119 officials in the city of Shifang had illegally claimed unemployment benefits while receiving public-sector salaries, in a scheme running from 2014 across 43 villages and costing approximately 1.5 million yuan.

=== Effects ===
Whether the effects of corruption in China are solely positive or negative is a subject of hot debate. Corruption is harmful in that it favors the most connected and unscrupulous, rather than the efficient. It also creates entry barriers in the market for those without such connections. Bribes also misdirect resources into wasteful or poor-quality projects. Further, proceeds from illegal transactions are usually sent to foreign bank accounts, resulting in capital flight. In short, as Yan Sun argues, corruption distorts and retards development.

The deleterious effects of corruption were thoroughly documented in Minxin Pei's report. The amount of money involved in corruption scandals has risen exponentially since the 1980s, and corruption is now more concentrated in state-controlled sectors. These include infrastructure projects, real estate, government procurement, and financial services. Pei estimates the cost of corruption could be up to $86 billion per year, though he does not specify his methodology for arriving at such an estimate.

Corruption in China also harms Western business interests, particularly those of foreign investors. They risk human rights, environmental, and financial liabilities, at the same time squaring off against rivals who engage in illegal practices to win business. In the long term, corruption has potentially "explosive consequences," including widening income inequalities within cities and between city and countryside, and creating a new, highly visible class of "socialist millionaires," which further fuels resentment from the citizenry.

Some corruption scandals violently attacked ordinary citizens, as in the case of Hewan village in Jiangsu province, where 200 thugs were hired to attack local farmers and force them off their land so CCP bosses could build a petrochemical plant. Sun Xiaojun, the party chief of Hewan village, was later arrested. One farmer died. Officials have also employed hit men or launched acid attacks on their rivals. In August 2009, a former director of the Communications Bureau in Hegang, Heilongjiang, who hired hitmen to kill his successor, supposedly because of the latter's ingratitude, was given the death penalty.

On the other hand, it is argued that corruption can bring benefits, and thus frown on anticorruption efforts for three reasons: rooting out corruption may lead to excessive caution; corruption may act as a "lubricant" to "loosen up" the bureaucracy and facilitate commercial exchanges; and thirdly, corruption is a necessary trade-off and inevitable part of the process of reform and opening up. Proponents argue that corruption helps allocate power to officials, perhaps even enabling the rise of a "new system" and acting as a driving force for reform.

A third argument is that corruption should not be understood simplistically as being either "good" or "bad." Political scientist Yuen Yuen Ang argues that all corruption is harmful, but different types of corruption harm in different ways. The defining type of corruption in China, according to her, is called "access money," exchange-based corruption among elites (for example, massive graft). She compares such corruption to steroids: "steroids are known as 'growth-enhancing drugs,' but they come with serious side effects." In an interview with The Diplomat, Ang said, "The right way to understand China's economy is that it's not just a high-growth economy, but also an imbalanced and unequal economy. This reflects the prevalence of access to money." Academic Lan Xiaohuan distinguishes between (1) predatory corruption like extortion or bribery, which impairs property rights, and (2) cronyism, which can coexist with economic growth for a time but which, over the long term, impairs or distorts economic development.

=== Countermeasures ===
The CCP has employed anti-corruption measures by creating laws and agencies for the purpose of decreasing corruption.

The Criminal Law of China (1997) defines numerous corruption-related offenses, the most common of which include: embezzlement, bribery, collective embezzlement, misappropriation, holding huge property with unidentified sources, misuse of authority, dereliction of duty, and fraud.

In 2004, the CCP devised strict regulations on officials assuming posts in business and enterprise. The Central Commission for Discipline Inspection and the Organization Department of the Chinese Communist Party issued a joint circular instructing CCP committees, governments and related departments at all levels not to give approval for CCP and government officials to take up concurrent posts in enterprises.

From 2005 to 2006, 6,000 officials were investigated and sentenced for corruption.

In 2007, Chinese authorities established a National Corruption Prevention Bureau, focused primarily on gathering information and intra-agency coordination. Unlike the Ministry of Supervision, Procuratorate, or CCDI, the NCPB was focused on "implementing preventive measures, monitoring the transfer of assets across organizations, facilitating and promoting information sharing between agencies, and policing corrupt practices within the nongovernmental sphere, including private enterprises, social organizations, and NGOs." The lack of independence of the NCPB, however, meant that its impact on actual corruption was limited.

The Anti-Unfair Competition Law prohibits commercial bribery, punishable by economic and administrative sanctions. It is prohibited to give or receive bribes in the course of selling or purchasing goods. In case of misconduct, companies are fined between 10.000 RMB and 200.000 RMB The Criminal Law of China prohibits giving and receiving property to obtain undue benefit, with penalties including fines, confiscation of property, imprisonment, or death. Such measures are largely ineffective, however, due to insufficient enforcement of the relevant laws. Further, because the Central Commission for Discipline Inspection largely operates in secrecy, it is unclear to researchers how allegedly corrupt officials are disciplined and punished. The odds for a corrupt official to end up in prison are less than three percent, making corruption a high-return, low-risk activity. This leniency of punishment has been one of the main reasons corruption is such a serious problem in China.

While corruption has grown in scope and complexity, anti-corruption policies, on the other hand, have not changed much. Communist-style mass campaigns with anti-corruption slogans, moral exhortations, and prominently displayed miscreants are still a key part of official policy, much as they were in the 1950s.

In 2009, according to internal CCP reports, there were 106,000 officials found guilty of corruption, an increase of 2.5 percent on the previous year. The number of officials caught embezzling more than one million RMB (US$146,000) went up by 19 percent over the year. With no independent oversight like NGOs or free media, corruption has flourished.

These efforts are punctuated by an occasional harsh prison term for major offenders or even executions. But rules and values for business and bureaucratic conduct are in flux, sometimes contradictory, and "deeply politicized." In many countries, systematic anti-corruption measures include independent trade and professional associations, which help limit corruption by promulgating codes of ethics and imposing quick penalties, watchdog groups like NGOs, and a free media. In China, these measures do not exist as a result of the CCP's means of rule.

Thus, while CCP disciplinary organs and prosecutorial agencies produce impressive statistics on corruption complaints received from the public, few citizens or observers believe corruption is being systematically addressed.

There are also limits to how far anti-corruption measures will go. For example, when Hu Jintao's son was implicated in a corruption investigation in Namibia, Chinese Internet portals and CCP-controlled media were ordered not to report on it.

At the same time, local leaders engage in "corruption protectionism," as coined by the head of the Hunan provincial Party Discipline Inspection Commission; apparatchiks thwart corruption investigations against the staff of their own agencies, allowing them to escape punishment. In some cases, this has impelled high-ranking officials to form special investigative groups with approval from the central government to avoid local resistance and enforce cooperation. However, since in China vertical and horizontal leadership structures often run at odds with one another, the CCP anti-corruption agencies find it hard to investigate graft at the lower levels. The goal of effectively controlling corruption thus remains elusive to the ruling Party, and only a propaganda tool to mislead the Chinese public on its false promises.

In May 2017, Alibaba signed a memorandum with the Supreme People's Procuratorate's Anti-Corruption Bureau "to create a clean, credible, rule-of-law market environment." Pursuant to the memorandum, the Bureau provides Alibaba and Ant Group with access to criminal records from bribery cases and Alibaba and Ant Group query those records, including during verification of Taobao sellers and in connection with anti-money laundering initiatives and financial risk controls.

In December 2020, the National Health Commission issued additional policies to combat fraud and corruption in healthcare. As part of its campaigns against fraud, inspections of 627,000 medical institutions were conducted, resulting in 26,100 people being sanctioned and the recovery of 22,310 million yuan.

A December 2020 article in Foreign Policy suggested that decades of corruption inside the CCP had created vulnerabilities exploited by outside intelligence agencies, particularly the American Central Intelligence Agency. CCP purges under the guise of anti-corruption were at least partially motivated by counterintelligence concerns.

No inheritance tax exists in China; The Economist speculates that a reason for this could be worries about exposing widespread graft among the political elite.

==== Political incentives for cracking down ====
Prominent anti-corruption cases in China are often an outgrowth of factional struggles for power in the CCP, as opponents use the "war of corruption" as a weapon against rivals in the CCP or the corporate world. Often, too, the central leadership's goal in cracking down on corruption is to send a message to those who step over some "unknown acceptable level of graft" or too obviously flaunt its benefits. Another reason is to show an angry public that the CCP is doing something about the problem.

In many such cases, the origins of anti-corruption measures are a mystery. When Chen Liangyu was ousted, analysts said it was because he lost a power struggle with leaders in Beijing. Chen was Shanghai's party secretary and a member of the CCP Politburo. In 2010, a re-release of the Chinese Communist Party's 52 code of ethics was published.

=== Individuals ===
Whistleblowers

The strict controls placed on the media by the Chinese government limit the discovery and reporting of corruption in China. Nevertheless, there have been cases of whistleblowers publicizing corruption in China, such as Guo Wengui.

== See also ==
- Anti-corruption campaign under Xi Jinping
- Crime in China

Anti-corruption organizations

- Anti-Corruption and Governance Research Center, School of Public Policy and Management, Tsinghua University, Beijing
- International Association of Anti-Corruption Authorities (IAACA) in Beijing
- Three-anti/five-anti campaigns (1951/1952)
- Central Commission for Discipline Inspection
- National Supervisory Commission
- Independent Commission Against Corruption (Hong Kong)
- Commission Against Corruption (Macau)

Cases

- Shanghai pension scandal
- Allegations of corruption in the construction of Chinese schools of the 2008 Sichuan earthquake
- Chongqing gang trials
- S-Chips Scandals

Society

- Guanxi (personal relationships in Chinese culture)
- Capital punishment in the People's Republic of China
- Naked official
- Law enforcement in the People's Republic of China
- Penal system in China

International corruption index

- Corruption Perceptions Index
- List of countries by Corruption Perceptions Index
