= Anti-Corruption and Governance Research Center =

The Anti-Corruption and Governance Research Center of Tsinghua University was established in November 2000. It is China's first university-based institute devoted to anti-corruption research.

The center has formed a multidisciplinary research team and it also benefits from its advisors, including Professor Susan Rose-Ackerman of Yale University.

The Center aims to assist China's ongoing anti-corruption campaign with high quality research on corruption control, corruption prevention and good governance.

Most of the center's current research projects concentrate on how China can prevent various types of corruption from happening through institutional reforms. The center has successfully carried out a number of important research projects on topics such as China's corruption prevention strategies, corruption prevention strategies of the 2008 Beijing Olympic Games, etc.

The Center aspires to become an important think tank on anti-corruption policies both in China and worldwide.

== See also ==
- Transparency International
- Corruption in China
