= Yao Gang =

Chinese executive (born 1962)

- 姚刚
- Born: May 1962 (age 64); Wenshui County, Shanxi, China
- Education: Ph.D.in Economics
- Occupation: Executive
- Years active: 1993–present
- Organization: China Securities Regulatory Commission (CSRC)
- Political party: Chinese Communist Party

Yao Gang (simplified Chinese: 姚刚; traditional Chinese: 姚剛; pinyin: Yáo Gāng; born May 1962) is a Chinese executive who served as one of four vice-chairmen at the China Securities Regulatory Commission (CSRC), China's top security regulator. He was investigated by the Chinese Communist Party's anti-graft agency in November 2015, after a stock market rout rocked global markets. Yao's downfall marked the widened government crackdown on corruption in the financial industry. Zhang Yujun (张育军), former assistant chairman of the CSRC, was placed under investigation in the end of 2015.

Yao is the highest-ranked securities official from the financial industry under investigation since General Secretary of the Chinese Communist Party Xi Jinping started his ongoing anti-corruption drive when he took power in the 18th National Congress of the Chinese Communist Party.

== Biography ==
Yao Gang was born in Wenshui County, Shanxi, in May 1962. From 1993 onwards, he successively served as deputy director and director of China Securities Regulatory Commission's Department of Futures Supervision. He was general manager, deputy party chief and vice-chairman of Guotai Jun'an Securities in 1999. Three years later he was transferred back to China Securities Regulatory Commission as its director of the Department of Supervision. In 2008 he was promoted to vice-chairmen of the China Securities Regulatory Commission. On November 13, 2015, a one sentence statement issued by the ruling Communist Party's corruption watchdog body, the Central Commission for Discipline Inspection (CCDI), said that "Yao Gang was suspected of serious violations of discipline."

On September 28, 2018, Yao was sentenced to 18 years in prison and fined 11 million yuan for taking bribes worth 69.61 million yuan and illegally making 2.1 million yuan of gains from insider trading by the Intermediate People's Court in Handan.
