= Chinese Communist Party 52 code of ethics =

Part of China's anti-corruption campaign

- Simplified Chinese: 中国共产党党员领导干部廉洁从政若干准则
Transcriptions

The Chinese Communist Party 52 code of ethics was issued on February 23, 2010, to fight widespread corruption within the Chinese Communist Party (CCP). The codes list 52 "unacceptable practices" (不准) which say that party officials who violate the guidelines will be severely punished and could face criminal charges.

== History ==
An initial "trial" code of ethics was pushed out in March 1997. According to Xinhua News Agency, the 2010 code is a replacement of the trial one introduced in 1997. In addition, the National Bureau of Corruption Prevention and the Ministry of Supervision made it a priority to monitor about 4,000 corrupt officials who left China with $50 billion between 1978 and 2003, after first sending their spouses and child overseas.

== 52 Rules ==
Each rule of the code is formulated as a "Not Allowed To…" statement describing some kind of illegal activity related to embezzlement, bribery, cover-up, and so on. Roots of some specific rules can be traced to the recent corruption scandals in China. For example, rule 20 states that officials are "Not allowed to divert the public funds, such as social security funds or housing funds (for other purposes)," which can be seen as a reference to the misuse of pension funds in Shanghai.

Special emphasis is put on indirect corruption when government officials use their positions to benefit relatives. Thus, the whole section of rules (from rule 28 to rule 36) explicitly names "spouses, children, in-laws, and other relatives" as illegal beneficiaries in certain transactions.

The code is concluded with rule 52 stating that CCP cadres are "[n]ot allowed to engage in activities going against social norms, professional ethics, and family virtues."

== See also ==
- Constitution of the Chinese Communist Party
