= Ma Keyao =

Chinese historian (born 1932)

- 马克垚
- Born: June 1932 (age 94); Wenshui County, Shanxi, China
- Occupation: Historian

Academic background
- Education: Peking University

Academic work
- Discipline: History
- Sub-discipline: History of Europe
- Institutions: Peking University

Chinese name
- Traditional Chinese: 馬克垚
- Simplified Chinese: 马克垚
Transcriptions
Standard Mandarin
- Hanyu Pinyin: Mǎ Kèyáo

Ma Keyao (Chinese: 马克垚; pinyin: Mǎ Kèyáo; born June 1932) is a Chinese historian who is a professor and doctoral supervisor at Peking University.

== Biography ==
Ma was born in Wenshui County, Shanxi, in June 1932. In 1952 he entered Peking University, where he majored in history. After graduating in 1956, he taught at the university. He was promoted to full professor in 1985. He served as director of the Department of History from 1986 to 1992.

== Works ==
- 世界文明史 [History of Civilizations] (in Chinese). Beijing: Peking University Press. 2016. ISBN 9787301238585.
- 古代专制制度考察 [An Investigation of Ancient Autocratic System] (in Chinese). Beijing: Peking University Press. 2017. ISBN 9787301281444.
- 西欧封建经济形态研究 [A Study of the Feudal Economic Forms in Western Europe] (in Chinese). Beijing: Commercial Press. 2020. ISBN 9787100178945.
- 困学苦思集 (in Chinese). Beijing: Capital Normal University Press. 2016. ISBN 9787565624476.
- 英国封建社会研究 [A Study of the Feudal Economic Forms in the United Kingdom] (in Chinese). Beijing: Peking University Press. 2000. ISBN 9787301091401.
- Qi Guogan; Ma Keyao (2017). 外国历史大事集 [Foreign Historical Events] (in Chinese). Beijing: China Social Sciences Press. ISBN 9787516196502.
