= Minxin Pei =

American political scientist

Pei Minxin
- 裴敏欣
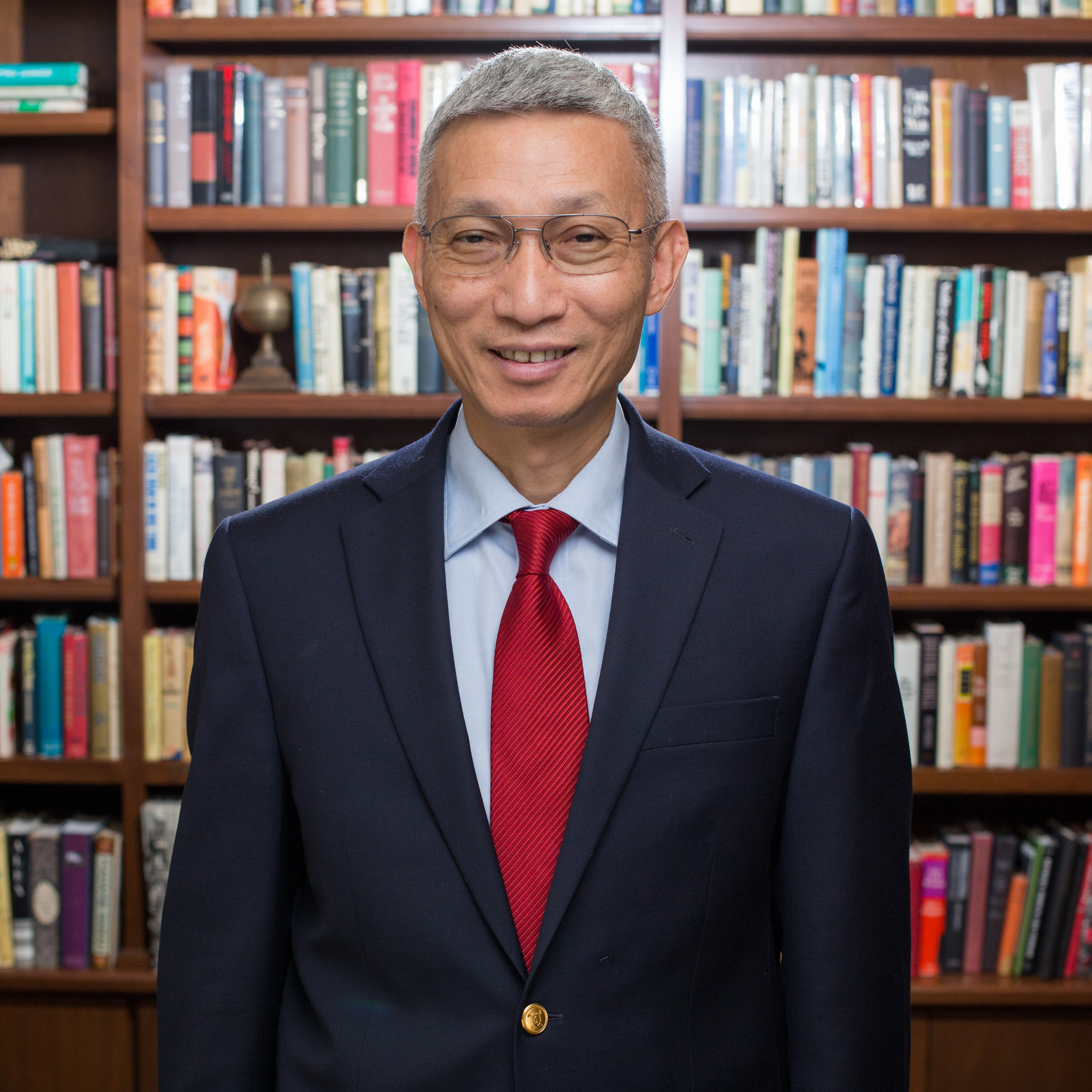
- Pei in 2017.
- Born: December 10, 1957 (age 68); Shanghai, China
- Citizenship: American
- Occupation: Political scientist

Academic background
- Education: Shanghai International Studies University (BA); University of Pittsburgh (MFA); Harvard University (MA, PhD)
- Website: https://www.cmc.edu/academic/faculty/profile/minxin-pei

Minxin Pei (Chinese: 裴敏欣; pinyin: Péi Mǐnxīn; born December 10, 1957) is a Chinese-American political scientist. He is the current editor of the China Leadership Monitor. He is a specialist on governance in China, U.S.–East Asia relations, mass surveillance in China, as well as democratization in developing nations. He is currently the Tom and Margot Pritzker '72 Professor of Government and George R. Roberts Fellow at Claremont McKenna College. He was formerly a senior associate in the Asia Program at the Carnegie Endowment for International Peace.

Pei earned his bachelor's degree in English from Shanghai International Studies University, and a master's degree and PhD in political science from Harvard University. In addition, he holds an M.F.A. from the University of Pittsburgh. He served as Director of the Keck Center for International and Strategic Studies at Claremont McKenna College from July 2009 to June 2019.

Pei has contributed to a number of newspapers and periodicals, including The New York Times, Foreign Policy, The Diplomat, Project Syndicate, Nikkei Asia, Fortune, and Foreign Affairs, and was an opinion columnist of Bloomberg from 2023 to 2024.

Pei is the editor of China Leadership Monitor, an online publication tracking major political and economic developments in China.

In 2008, he was listed as one of the top 100 public intellectuals by Prospect magazine. In 2019, he was the inaugural Library of Congress Chair on U.S.-China Relations.

== Publications ==
=== Books ===
- From Reform to Revolution: The Demise of Communism in China and the Soviet Union (Harvard University Press, 1994)
- China’s Trapped Transition: The Limits of Developmental Autocracy (Harvard University Press, 2006)
- China's Crony Capitalism: The Dynamics of Regime Decay (Harvard University Press, 3 October 2016)
- The Sentinel State: Surveillance and the Survival of Dictatorship in China (Harvard University Press, February 2024)
- The Broken China Dream: How Reform Revived Totalitarianism (Princeton University Press, 2025)

=== Articles ===
- The US Is Learning the Wrong Cold War Lessons on China, Bloomberg Opinions, June 24, 2024
- To Beat China, US Should Stop Acting Like China, Bloomberg Opinions, May 30, 2024
- What China Really Needs Is More Bad News, Bloomberg Opinions, February 8, 2024
- Why China Can’t Export Its Model of Surveillance, Foreign Affairs, February 6, 2024
- China’s Hands Are Tied Against Tangle of US Alliances, Bloomberg Opinions, April 16, 2024
