= Wenshui County =

Wenshui County 文水县
- County
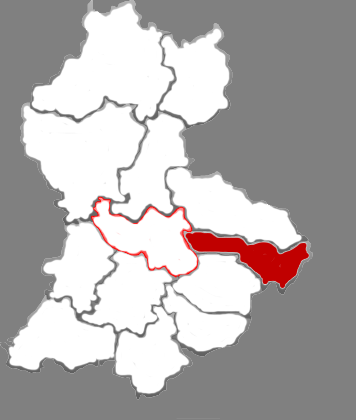
- Wenshui in Lüliang

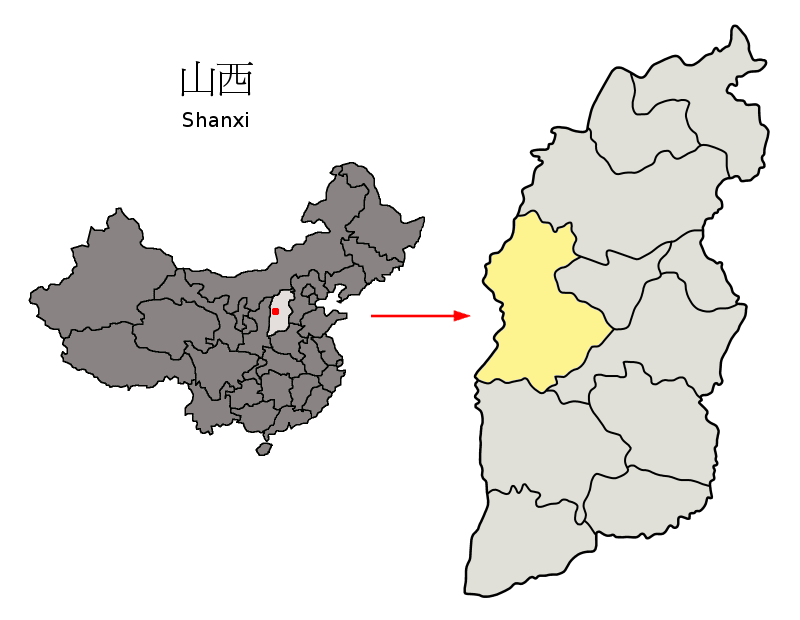
- Lüliang in Shanxi
- Coordinates: 37°26′17″N 112°01′44″E
- Country: People's Republic of China
- Province: Shanxi
- Prefecture-level city: Lüliang

Area
  - Total: 1,069 km^{2} (413 sq mi)

Population (2020)
  - Total: 372,580
  - Density: 348.5/km^{2} (902.7/sq mi)
- Time zone: UTC+8 (China Standard)

Wenshui County (Chinese: 文水县; pinyin: Wénshuǐ Xiàn) is a county in the west-central part of Shanxi Province, China. It is under the administration of the prefecture-level city of Lüliang.

This county was the ancestral home of Wu Zetian, the only empress in Chinese history.

== Climate ==
Climate data for Wenshui, elevation 750 m (2,460 ft), (1991–2020 normals, extremes 1981–present)
Month	Jan	Feb	Mar	Apr	May	Jun	Jul	Aug	Sep	Oct	Nov	Dec	Year
Record high °C (°F)	13.6 (56.5)	21.6 (70.9)	29.2 (84.6)	37.5 (99.5)	35.8 (96.4)	39.5 (103.1)	39.5 (103.1)	37.5 (99.5)	36.8 (98.2)	30.0 (86.0)	24.0 (75.2)	18.4 (65.1)	39.5 (103.1)
Mean daily maximum °C (°F)	2.5 (36.5)	7.2 (45.0)	13.9 (57.0)	21.0 (69.8)	26.5 (79.7)	29.8 (85.6)	30.5 (86.9)	28.5 (83.3)	24.4 (75.9)	18.6 (65.5)	10.6 (51.1)	3.8 (38.8)	18.1 (64.6)
Daily mean °C (°F)	−4.9 (23.2)	−0.5 (31.1)	6.3 (43.3)	13.4 (56.1)	19.0 (66.2)	22.7 (72.9)	24.5 (76.1)	22.5 (72.5)	17.3 (63.1)	11.0 (51.8)	3.2 (37.8)	−3.2 (26.2)	10.9 (51.7)
Mean daily minimum °C (°F)	−10.9 (12.4)	−6.7 (19.9)	−0.6 (30.9)	5.6 (42.1)	10.9 (51.6)	15.5 (59.9)	19.0 (66.2)	17.3 (63.1)	11.4 (52.5)	4.7 (40.5)	−2.5 (27.5)	−8.8 (16.2)	4.6 (40.2)
Record low °C (°F)	−26.5 (−15.7)	−24.2 (−11.6)	−14.0 (6.8)	−6.4 (20.5)	−2.0 (28.4)	3.7 (38.7)	10.5 (50.9)	8.5 (47.3)	−1.9 (28.6)	−8.1 (17.4)	−24.3 (−11.7)	−25.3 (−13.5)	−26.5 (−15.7)
Average precipitation mm (inches)	3.5 (0.14)	4.9 (0.19)	11.2 (0.44)	24.0 (0.94)	28.7 (1.13)	44.4 (1.75)	103.6 (4.08)	98.5 (3.88)	65.9 (2.59)	34.0 (1.34)	13.8 (0.54)	2.7 (0.11)	435.2 (17.13)
Average precipitation days (≥ 0.1 mm)	2.2	2.5	3.4	5.3	6.1	8.8	10.9	10.6	8.2	6.0	3.2	1.8	69
Average snowy days	2.7	3.1	1.8	0.5	0	0	0	0	0	0.1	1.6	2.1	11.9
Average relative humidity (%)	57	53	48	48	50	58	70	75	73	68	63	58	60
Mean monthly sunshine hours	146.2	159.2	200.1	228.2	245.8	216.7	200.3	196.0	177.9	179.5	155.2	143.7	2,248.8
Percentage possible sunshine	48	52	54	57	56	49	45	47	49	52	52	49	51
Source: China Meteorological Administration all-time August record high

== Notable people ==
- Ma Keyao (born 1932) - historian and professor
