= List of countries by Corruption Perceptions Index =

Country ranking by public sector corruption

Map of the Corruption Perceptions Index, 2025, as scored by Transparency international. A higher score indicates greater transparency (i.e., less corruption). The score ranges are: Less corrupt 90–100 80–89 70–79 60–69 50–59 / More corrupt 40–49 30–39 20–29 10–19 0–9 No data

This is a list of countries by Corruption Perceptions Index (CPI) as published by Transparency International, including scores and rankings. The Corruption Perceptions Index (CPI) assesses countries by their perceived levels of public sector corruption, as assessed by experts and business executives. The CPI generally defines corruption as an "abuse of entrusted power for private gain". The index is published annually by the non-governmental organisation Transparency International since 1995.

The 2024 CPI, published in February 2025, currently ranks 180 countries "on a scale from 100 (very clean) to 0 (highly corrupt)" based on the situation between 1 May 2023 and 30 April 2024. Denmark, Finland, Singapore, New Zealand, Norway, Switzerland and Sweden (almost all scoring above 80 over the last thirteen years), are perceived as the least corrupt nations in the world — ranking consistently high among international financial transparency — while the most apparently corrupt is South Sudan (scoring 8), along with Somalia (9) and Venezuela (10).

== Scores since 2012 ==
Since 2012, the Corruption Perceptions Index has been scored from 100 (very clean) to 0 (highly corrupt).

=== Legend ===
Scores	Perceived as less corrupt					Perceived as more corrupt				
Since 2012	99–90	89–80	79–70	69–60	59–50	49–40	39–30	29–20	19–10	9–0

=== 2020–2025 ===
#	Nation or Territory	2025		2024		2023		2022		2021		2020	
#	Nation or Territory	Score	Δ (Note: Change in Rank (not Score).)	Score	Δ	Score	Δ	Score	Δ	Score	Δ	Score	Δ
1	Denmark	89	–	90	–	90	–	90	–	88	–	88	–
2	Finland	88	–	88	–	87	–	87	-1	88	+2	85	–
3	Singapore	84	–	84	+2	83	–	83	-1	85	-1	85	+1
4	New Zealand	81	–	83	-1	85	-1	87	-1	88	–	88	–
4	Norway	81	+1	81	-1	84	–	84	–	85	+3	84	–
6	Sweden	80	+2	80	-2	82	-1	83	-1	85	-1	85	+1
6	Switzerland	80	-1	81	+1	82	+1	82	–	84	-4	85	+1
8	Luxembourg	78	-3	81	+5	78	+1	77	-1	81	–	80	–
8	Netherlands	78	+1	78	-1	79	–	80	–	82	–	82	–
10	Germany	77	+5	75	-6	78	–	79	+1	80	-1	80	–
10	Iceland	77	–	77	+9	72	-5	74	-1	74	+4	75	-6
12	Australia	76	-2	77	+4	75	-1	75	+5	73	-7	77	+1
12	Estonia	76	+1	76	–	76	+2	74	-1	74	+4	75	+1
12	Hong Kong	76	+5	74	-2	75	-2	76	–	76	-1	77	+5
12	Ireland	76	-2	77	+1	77	-1	77	+3	74	+7	72	-2
16	Canada	75	-1	75	-3	76	+2	74	-1	75	-2	77	+1
17	Uruguay	73	-4	76	+5	73	-2	74	+4	73	+3	71	–
18	Bhutan	71	–	72	+8	68	-1	68	–	68	-1	68	+1
18	Japan	71	+2	71	-3	73	+2	73	–	73	+1	74	+1
20	United Kingdom	70	–	71	+3	71	-2	73	-7	78	–	77	+1
21	Austria	69	+4	67	-5	71	+2	71	-9	74	+2	76	-3
21	Belgium	69	+1	69	-6	73	+2	73	–	73	-3	76	+2
21	United Arab Emirates	69	+2	68	+4	68	+1	67	-3	69	-3	71	–
24	Barbados	68	-1	68	+1	69	+5	65	–	65	–	64	+1
24	Seychelles	68	-6	72	+4	71	+3	70	–	70	+4	66	–
24	Taiwan	68	+1	67	+3	67	-3	68	–	68	+3	65	–
27	France	66	-2	67	-4	71	+1	72	+1	71	+1	69	–
28	Lithuania	65	+4	63	+2	61	-1	62	+1	61	+1	60	–
29	Bahamas	64	-1	65	+2	64	–	64	–	64	–	63	-1
29	United States	64	-1	65	-3	69	–	69	+3	67	-2	67	-2
31	Brunei Darussalam	63	–	—N/a		—N/a		—N/a		—N/a		60	–
31	Chile	63	+1	63	-3	66	-2	67	–	67	-2	67	+1
31	Saint Vincent and the Grenadines	63	+1	63	+4	60	-1	60	+1	59	+4	59	-1
31	South Korea	63	-1	64	+2	63	-1	63	+1	62	+1	61	+6
35	Cape Verde	62	–	62	-5	64	+5	60	+4	58	+2	58	–
35	Israel	62	-5	64	+3	62	-2	63	+5	59	-1	60	–
37	Dominica	60	-1	60	+6	56	+3	55	–	55	+3	55	–
37	Latvia	60	+1	59	-2	60	+3	59	-3	59	+6	57	+2
39	Czech Republic	59	+7	56	-5	57	–	56	+8	54	–	54	-5
39	Saint Lucia	59	-1	59	+7	55	–	55	-3	56	+3	56	+3
41	Botswana	58	+2	57	-4	59	-4	60	+10	55	-10	60	-1
41	Qatar	58	-3	59	+2	58	–	58	-9	63	-1	63	–
41	Rwanda	58	+2	57	+6	53	+5	51	-2	53	-3	54	+2
41	Slovenia	58	-5	60	+6	56	-1	56	–	57	-6	60	–
45	Saudi Arabia	57	-4	59	+15	52	+1	51	-2	53	–	53	-1
46	Costa Rica	56	-4	58	+3	55	+3	54	-9	58	+3	57	+2
46	Grenada	56	–	56	+3	53	+2	52	+1	53	–	53	-1
46	Portugal	56	-3	57	-9	61	-1	62	-1	62	+1	61	-3
49	Cyprus	55	-3	56	+3	53	+2	52	+1	53	-10	57	-1
49	Fiji	55	+1	55	+3	52	-4	53	-4	55	+10	—N/a	
49	Spain	55	-3	56	-10	60	-1	60	-1	61	-2	62	-2
52	Italy	53	–	54	-10	56	-1	56	+1	56	+10	53	-1
53	Poland	52	+1	53	-6	54	-2	55	-3	56	+3	56	-4
54	Malaysia	52	+3	50	–	50	+4	47	+1	48	-5	51	-6
54	Oman	52	-4	55	+20	43	-1	44	-13	52	-7	54	+7
56	Bahrain	50	-6	53	+23	42	-7	44	+9	42	–	42	-1
56	Georgia	50	-3	53	-4	53	-8	56	+4	55	–	56	-1
56	Greece	50	+3	49	–	49	–	52	+7	49	+1	50	+1
56	Jordan	50	+3	49	+4	46	-2	47	-3	49	+2	49	–
60	Malta	49	+5	46	-10	51	-1	51	-5	54	+3	53	-2
61	Mauritius	48	-5	51	-1	51	+2	50	-8	54	+3	53	+4
61	Slovakia	48	-2	49	-12	54	+2	53	+7	52	+4	49	-1
63	Croatia	47	–	47	-6	50	–	50	+6	47	–	47	–
63	Vanuatu	47	-6	50	-4	48	-1	48	+6	45	+9	43	-11
65	Armenia	46	-2	47	-1	47	+1	46	-5	49	+2	49	+17
65	Kuwait	46	–	46	-2	46	+14	42	-4	43	+5	42	+7
65	Montenegro	46	–	46	-2	46	+2	45	-1	46	+3	45	-1
65	Namibia	46	-6	49	–	49	–	49	-1	49	-1	51	-1
65	Senegal	46	+4	45	+1	43	+2	43	+1	43	-6	45	-1
70	Benin	45	-1	45	+1	43	+2	43	+6	42	+5	41	-3
70	Romania	45	-5	46	-2	46	–	46	+3	45	+3	44	+1
70	São Tomé and Príncipe	45	-1	45	-2	45	-2	45	+1	45	-3	47	+1
73	Jamaica	44	–	44	-4	44	–	44	+1	44	-1	44	+5
73	Solomon Islands	44	+3	43	-6	43	+7	42	-4	43	+5	42	-1
73	Timor-Leste	44	–	44	-3	43	+7	42	+5	41	+4	40	+7
76	China	43	–	43	–	42	-11	45	+1	45	+12	42	+2
76	Ghana	43	+4	42	+10	43	+2	43	+1	43	+2	43	+5
76	Ivory Coast	43	-7	45	+18	40	+12	37	+6	36	-1	36	+2
76	Kosovo	43	-3	44	+10	41	+1	41	+3	39	+17	36	-3
80	Moldova	42	-4	43	–	42	+15	39	+14	36	+10	34	+5
81	South Africa	41	+1	41	+1	41	-11	43	-2	44	-1	44	+1
81	Trinidad and Tobago	41	+1	41	-6	42	+1	42	+5	41	+4	40	-1
81	Vietnam	41	+7	40	-5	41	-6	42	+10	39	+17	36	-8
84	Bulgaria	40	-8	43	-9	45	+5	43	+6	42	-9	44	+5
84	Burkina Faso	40	-2	41	+1	41	-6	42	+1	42	+8	40	-1
84	Cuba	40	-2	41	-6	42	-11	45	-1	46	-1	47	-3
84	Guyana	40	+8	39	-5	40	-2	40	+2	39	-4	41	+2
84	Hungary	40	-2	41	-6	42	+1	42	-4	43	-4	44	+1
84	North Macedonia	40	+4	40	-12	42	+9	40	+2	39	+24	35	-5
84	Tanzania	40	-2	41	+5	40	+7	38	-7	39	+7	38	+2
91	Albania	39	-11	42	+18	37	+3	36	+9	35	-6	36	+2
91	India	39	+5	38	-3	39	-8	40	–	40	+1	40	-6
91	Maldives	39	+5	38	-3	39	-8	40	–	40	-10	43	+55
91	Morocco	39	+8	37	-2	38	-3	38	-7	39	-1	40	-6
91	Tunisia	39	+1	39	-5	40	-2	40	-15	44	-1	44	+5
96	Ethiopia	38	+3	37	-1	37	-4	38	-7	39	+7	38	+2
96	Kazakhstan	38	-8	40	+5	39	+8	36	+1	37	-8	38	+19
96	Suriname	38	-8	40	-1	40	-2	40	+2	39	+7	38	-24
99	Colombia	37	-7	39	-5	40	+4	39	-4	39	+5	39	+4
99	Dominican Republic	37	+5	36	+4	35	+15	32	+5	30	+9	28	–
99	Gambia	37	-3	38	+2	37	+12	34	-8	37	–	37	-6
99	Lesotho	37	–	37	-6	39	+6	37	-3	38	-13	41	+2
99	Zambia	37	-7	39	+2	37	+18	33	+1	33	–	33	-4
104	Argentina	36	-5	37	-1	37	-4	38	+2	38	-18	42	-12
104	Belize	36	–	—N/a		—N/a		—N/a		—N/a		—N/a	
104	Ukraine	36	+1	35	-1	36	+12	33	+6	32	-5	33	+9
107	Brazil	35	–	34	-3	36	-10	38	+2	38	-2	38	+12
107	Sri Lanka	35	+14	32	-6	34	-14	36	+1	37	-8	38	-1
109	Algeria	34	-2	34	-3	36	+12	33	+1	33	-13	36	+2
109	Bosnia and Herzegovina	34	+5	33	-6	35	+2	34	–	35	+1	35	-10
109	Indonesia	34	-10	37	+16	34	-5	34	-14	38	+6	37	-17
109	Laos	34	+5	33	+22	28	-10	31	+2	30	+6	29	-4
109	Malawi	34	-2	34	+8	34	-5	34	–	35	+19	30	-6
109	Nepal	34	-2	34	+1	35	+2	34	+7	33	–	33	-4
109	Sierra Leone	34	+5	33	-6	35	+2	34	+5	34	+2	33	+2
116	Ecuador	33	+5	32	-6	34	-14	36	+4	36	-13	39	+1
116	Panama	33	-2	33	-6	35	-7	36	+4	36	+6	35	-10
116	Serbia	33	-11	35	-1	36	-3	36	-5	38	-2	38	-3
116	Thailand	33	-9	34	+1	35	-7	36	+9	35	-6	36	-3
120	Angola	32	+1	32	–	33	-5	33	+20	29	+6	27	+4
120	El Salvador	32	+10	30	-4	31	-10	33	-1	34	-11	36	+9
120	Philippines	32	-6	33	+1	34	+1	33	+1	33	-2	34	-2
120	Togo	32	+1	32	+5	31	+4	30	-2	30	+6	29	-4
124	Belarus	31	-10	33	-16	37	-7	39	-9	41	-19	47	+3
124	Djibouti	31	+3	31	+3	30	–	30	-2	30	+14	27	-16
124	Mongolia	31	-10	33	+7	33	-5	33	-6	35	+1	35	-5
124	Niger	31	-17	34	+17	32	-2	32	+1	31	-1	32	-3
124	Turkey	31	-17	34	+8	34	-14	36	-5	38	-10	40	+5
124	Uzbekistan	31	-3	32	–	33	+5	31	+14	28	+6	26	+7
130	Azerbaijan	30	+24	22	–	22	+3	23	-29	30	+1	30	-3
130	Egypt	30	–	30	-22	35	+22	30	-13	33	–	33	-11
130	Kenya	30	-9	32	+5	31	-3	32	+5	30	-4	31	+13
130	Mauritania	30	–	30	–	30	–	30	+10	28	-6	29	+3
130	Peru	30	-3	31	-6	33	-20	36	+4	36	-11	38	+7
135	Gabon	29	–	27	+1	28	–	29	-12	31	+5	30	-6
136	Bolivia	28	-3	28	–	29	-7	31	+2	30	-4	31	-1
136	Iraq	28	+4	26	+14	23	+3	23	–	23	+3	21	+2
136	Liberia	28	-1	27	+10	25	-3	26	-6	29	+1	28	–
136	Mali	28	-1	27	+1	28	+1	28	-1	29	-7	30	+1
136	Pakistan	28	-1	27	-2	29	+7	27	–	28	-16	31	-4
141	Mexico	27	-1	26	-14	31	–	31	-2	31	–	31	+6
142	Cameroon	26	-2	26	–	27	+2	26	+2	27	+5	25	+4
142	Guatemala	26	+4	25	+8	23	-4	24	–	25	-1	25	-3
142	Guinea	26	-9	28	+8	26	+6	25	+3	25	-13	28	-7
142	Kyrgyzstan	26	+4	25	-5	26	-1	27	+4	27	-20	31	+2
142	Nigeria	26	-2	26	+5	25	+5	24	+4	24	-5	25	-3
142	Papua New Guinea	26	-15	31	+6	29	-3	30	-6	31	+18	27	-5
148	Madagascar	25	-8	26	+5	25	-3	26	+5	26	+2	25	+9
148	Uganda	25	-8	26	+1	26	+1	26	+2	27	-2	27	-5
150	Bangladesh	24	+1	23	-2	24	-2	25	–	26	-1	26	–
150	Central African Republic	24	-1	24	–	24	+1	24	+4	24	-8	26	+7
150	Paraguay	24	-1	24	-13	28	+1	28	-9	30	+9	28	–
153	Congo	23	-2	23	+7	22	+6	21	-2	21	+3	19	–
153	Eswatini	23	-18	27	-5	30	–	30	-8	32	-5	33	-4
153	Iran	23	-2	23	+2	24	-2	25	+3	25	-1	25	-3
153	Lebanon	23	+1	22	-4	24	+1	24	+4	24	-5	25	-12
157	Chad	22	+1	21	+4	20	+5	19	-3	20	-4	21	+2
157	Honduras	22	-3	22	–	23	+3	23	–	23	–	24	-11
157	Russia	22	-3	22	-13	26	-4	28	-1	29	-7	30	+8
157	Zimbabwe	22	+1	21	-9	24	+8	23	–	23	–	24	+1
161	Guinea-Bissau	21	-3	21	–	22	+6	21	-2	21	+3	19	+3
161	Mozambique	21	-15	25	-1	25	-3	26	+5	26	+2	25	-3
163	Cambodia	20	-5	21	–	22	-8	24	+7	23	+3	21	+2
163	Comoros	20	-5	21	+4	20	+5	19	-3	20	-4	21	-7
163	Democratic Republic of the Congo	20	–	20	-1	20	+4	20	+3	19	+1	18	-2
166	Tajikistan	19	-2	19	-2	20	-12	24	–	25	-1	25	+4
167	Burundi	17	-2	17	-3	20	+9	17	-2	19	-4	19	–
167	Turkmenistan	17	-2	17	+5	18	-3	19	+2	19	-4	19	–
169	Afghanistan	16	-4	17	-3	20	-12	24	+24	16	-9	19	+8
169	Haiti	16	-1	16	+4	17	-1	17	-7	20	+6	18	-2
169	Myanmar	16	-1	16	-6	20	-5	23	-17	28	-3	28	-7
172	Equatorial Guinea	15	+1	13	-1	17	-1	17	+1	17	+2	16	-1
172	North Korea	15	-2	15	+2	17	-1	17	+3	16	-4	18	+2
172	Syria	15	+5	12	–	13	+1	13	–	13	–	14	–
175	Nicaragua	14	-3	14	–	17	-5	19	-3	20	-5	22	+2
175	Sudan	14	-5	15	-8	20	–	22	+2	20	+10	16	-1
177	Eritrea	13	-4	13	-12	21	+1	22	-1	22	-1	21	–
177	Libya	13	-4	13	-3	18	+1	17	+1	17	+1	17	-5
177	Yemen	13	-4	13	+3	16	–	16	-2	16	+2	15	+1
180	Venezuela	10	-2	10	-1	13	–	14	–	14	-1	15	-3
181	Somalia	9	-2	9	+1	11	–	12	-2	13	+1	12	+1
181	South Sudan	9	-1	8	-3	13	+1	13	+2	11	-1	12	–

=== 2012–2019 ===
#	Nation or Territory	2019		2018		2017		2016		2015		2014		2013		2012
#	Nation or Territory	Score	Δ	Score	Δ	Score	Δ	Score	Δ	Score	Δ	Score	Δ	Score	Δ	Score
1	New Zealand	87	+1	87	-1	89	–	90	–	91	+1	91	-1	91	–	90
1	Denmark	87	–	88	+1	88	-1	90	–	91	–	92	–	91	–	90
3	Finland	86	–	85	–	85	–	89	–	90	–	89	–	89	-2	90
4	Sweden	85	-1	85	+3	84	-2	88	–	89	–	87	-1	89	+1	88
4	Singapore	85	-1	85	+3	84	+1	84	–	85	–	84	-2	86	–	87
4	Switzerland	85	-1	85	–	85	+2	86	+1	86	-1	86	+2	85	-1	86
7	Norway	84	–	84	-4	85	+3	85	-1	88	–	86	–	86	+2	85
8	Netherlands	82	–	82	–	82	–	83	+1	84	-1	83	–	83	+1	84
9	Germany	80	+2	80	+1	81	-2	81	+1	81	+1	79	–	78	+1	79
9	Luxembourg	80	–	81	-1	82	+2	81	-3	85	+2	82	+2	80	+1	80
11	Iceland	78	+3	76	-1	77	+1	78	-1	79	-1	79	–	78	-1	82
12	United Kingdom	77	-1	80	-3	82	+2	81	+1	81	+3	78	–	76	+3	74
12	Canada	77	-3	81	-1	82	+1	82	+1	83	–	81	-1	81	–	84
12	Austria	77	+2	76	+2	75	+1	75	-1	76	+7	72	+3	69	-1	69
12	Australia	77	+1	77	–	77	–	79	–	79	-2	80	-2	81	-2	85
16	Hong Kong	76	-2	76	-1	77	+2	77	+3	75	-1	74	-2	75	-1	77
17	Belgium	75	–	75	-1	75	-1	77	–	77	–	76	–	75	+1	75
18	Estonia	74	–	73	+3	71	+1	70	+1	70	+4	69	+1	68	+4	64
18	Ireland	74	–	73	+1	74	–	73	-1	75	-1	74	+4	72	+4	69
20	Japan	73	-2	73	+2	73	–	72	-2	75	-3	76	+3	74	-1	74
21	United Arab Emirates	71	+2	70	-2	71	+3	66	-1	70	+3	70	–	69	+1	68
21	Uruguay	71	+2	70	–	70	-2	71	–	74	–	73	-2	73	+1	72
23	United States	69	-1	71	-6	75	+2	74	-2	76	+1	74	+2	73	–	73
23	France	69	-2	72	+2	70	–	69	–	70	+4	69	-5	71	–	71
25	Bhutan	68	–	68	+1	67	+1	65	–	65	+3	65	+1	63	+2	63
26	Chile	67	+1	67	-1	67	-2	66	-1	70	-2	73	+1	71	-2	72
27	Seychelles	66	+1	66	+8	60	+4	—N/a		55	+4	55	+3	54	+4	52
28	Taiwan	65	+3	63	-2	63	+2	61	–	62	+5	61	–	61	+1	61
29	Bahamas	64	–	65	-1	65	-4	66	–	—N/a		71	-2	71	–	71
30	Barbados	62	-5	68	–	68	+6	61	-14	—N/a		74	-2	75	–	76
30	Portugal	62	–	64	-1	63	–	62	-1	64	+3	63	+2	62	–	63
30	Spain	62	+11	58	+1	57	-1	58	-4	58	+1	60	+2	59	-10	65
30	Qatar	62	+3	62	-4	63	+2	61	-9	71	+5	69	+1	68	-1	68
34	Botswana	61	–	61	–	61	+1	60	-6	63	+2	63	-1	64	–	65
35	Brunei Darussalam	60	-4	63	+1	62	+9	58	-3	—N/a		—N/a		60	+8	55
35	Lithuania	60	+3	59	–	59	–	59	-2	59	+4	58	+3	57	+5	54
35	Israel	60	-1	61	-2	62	-4	64	+4	61	+6	60	-2	61	+3	60
35	Slovenia	60	+1	60	-2	61	-3	61	+3	60	+6	58	+3	57	-6	61
39	Saint Vincent and the Grenadines	59	+2	58	-1	58	-5	60	–	—N/a		62	-2	62	+3	62
39	South Korea	59	+6	57	+6	54	+1	53	-9	54	+1	55	+2	55	-1	56
41	Cape Verde	58	+4	57	+3	55	-10	59	+2	55	+3	57	-2	58	–	60
41	Poland	58	-5	60	–	60	-7	62	–	63	+7	61	+2	60	+3	58
41	Cyprus	58	-3	59	+4	57	+5	55	-15	61	-1	63	–	63	-2	66
44	Costa Rica	56	+4	56	-10	59	+3	58	-1	55	+8	54	+1	53	-1	54
44	Georgia	56	-3	58	+5	56	-2	57	+4	52	+3	52	+4	49	-4	52
44	Latvia	56	-3	58	-1	58	+4	57	-6	56	+6	55	+5	53	+5	49
44	Czech Republic	56	-6	59	+4	57	+5	55	-9	56	+15	51	+4	48	-3	49
48	Saint Lucia	55	+2	55	-2	55	-13	60	-11	—N/a		71	-2	71	–	71
48	Dominica	55	-3	57	-3	57	-4	59	+2	—N/a		58	+1	58	–	58
50	Malta	54	+1	54	-5	56	+1	55	-13	60	+10	55	+1	56	-2	57
51	Malaysia	53	+10	47	+1	47	-7	49	-1	50	-3	52	+2	50	+1	49
51	Grenada	53	+2	52	-1	52	-6	56	—N/a	—N/a		—N/a		—N/a		—N/a
51	Rwanda	53	-3	56	–	55	+2	54	-7	54	+12	49	-6	53	+1	53
51	Saudi Arabia	53	+7	49	-1	49	+5	46	-14	52	+7	49	+8	46	+3	44
51	Italy	53	+2	52	+1	50	+6	47	+1	44	+8	43	–	43	+3	42
56	Oman	52	-3	52	+15	44	-4	45	-4	45	+4	45	-3	47	–	47
56	Namibia	52	-4	53	+1	51	–	52	-8	53	+10	49	+2	48	+1	48
56	Mauritius	52	–	51	-2	50	-4	54	-5	53	+3	54	+4	52	-9	57
59	Slovakia	50	-2	50	-3	50	–	51	-4	51	+4	50	+7	47	+1	46
60	Jordan	48	-2	49	+1	48	-2	48	-12	53	+10	49	+11	45	-8	48
60	Greece	48	+7	45	-8	48	+10	44	-11	46	+11	43	+11	40	+14	36
60	Cuba	48	+1	47	+1	47	-2	47	-4	47	+7	46	–	46	-5	48
63	Croatia	47	-3	48	-3	49	-2	49	-5	51	+11	48	-4	48	+5	46
64	São Tomé and Príncipe	46	–	46	–	46	-2	46	+4	42	+10	42	-4	42	–	42
64	Vanuatu	46	–	46	+7	43	—N/a	—N/a		—N/a		—N/a		—N/a		—N/a
66	Argentina	45	+19	40	–	39	+10	36	+11	32	+1	34	-1	34	-4	35
66	Montenegro	45	+1	45	-3	46	–	45	-3	44	+15	42	-9	44	+8	41
66	Senegal	45	+1	45	-1	45	-2	45	-3	44	+8	43	+8	41	+17	36
66	Belarus	45	+4	44	-2	44	+11	40	+27	32	+13	31	+4	29	–	31
70	Hungary	44	-6	46	+2	45	-9	48	-7	51	-2	54	-1	54	-1	55
70	South Africa	44	+3	43	-2	43	-7	45	-3	44	+6	44	+5	42	-3	43
70	Romania	44	-9	47	-2	48	-2	48	+1	46	+11	43	–	43	-3	44
70	Suriname	44	+3	43	+4	41	-13	45	+24	36	+12	36	-6	36	-6	37
74	Jamaica	43	-4	44	-2	44	+15	39	-14	41	+16	38	-2	38	–	38
74	Tunisia	43	-1	43	+1	42	+1	41	+1	38	+3	40	-2	41	-2	41
74	Bulgaria	43	+3	42	-6	43	+4	41	-6	41	–	43	+8	41	-2	41
77	Bahrain	42	+22	36	+4	36	-33	43	-20	51	+5	49	+2	48	-4	51
77	Solomon Islands	42	-7	44	+15	39	-13	42	—N/a	—N/a		—N/a		—N/a		—N/a
77	Armenia	42	+28	35	+2	35	+6	33	-18	35	-1	37	–	36	+11	34
80	Ghana	41	-2	41	+3	40	-11	43	-14	47	+5	48	+2	46	+1	45
80	Morocco	41	-7	43	+8	40	+9	37	-2	36	-8	39	+11	37	-3	37
80	India	41	-2	41	+3	40	-2	40	-3	38	+9	38	+9	36	–	36
80	China	41	+7	39	-10	41	+2	40	+4	37	+17	36	-20	40	–	39
80	Benin	41	+5	40	–	39	+10	36	-12	37	-3	39	+14	36	–	36
85	Guyana	40	+8	37	-2	38	+17	34	+11	29	+5	30	+12	27	-3	28
85	Trinidad and Tobago	40	-7	41	-1	41	+24	35	-29	39	+13	38	-2	38	-3	39
85	Indonesia	40	+4	38	+7	37	-6	37	-2	36	+19	34	+7	32	+4	32
85	Burkina Faso	40	-7	41	-4	42	-2	42	+4	38	+9	38	-2	38	–	38
85	Lesotho	40	-7	41	-4	42	+9	39	-22	44	-6	49	–	49	+9	45
85	Kuwait	40	-7	41	+7	39	-10	41	-20	49	+12	44	+2	43	-3	44
91	Serbia	39	-4	39	-10	41	-5	42	-1	40	+7	41	-6	42	+8	39
91	Turkey	39	-13	41	+3	40	-6	41	-9	42	-2	45	-11	50	+1	49
93	Sri Lanka	38	-4	38	+2	38	+4	36	-12	37	+2	38	+6	37	-12	40
93	Ecuador	38	+21	34	+3	32	+3	31	-14	32	+4	33	-8	35	+16	32
93	Timor-Leste	38	+12	35	-14	38	+10	35	+22	28	+10	28	-14	30	-6	33
96	Ethiopia	37	+18	34	-7	35	+1	34	-6	33	+8	33	+1	33	+2	33
96	Vietnam	37	+21	33	-10	35	+6	33	-2	31	+8	31	-3	31	+7	31
96	Gambia	37	-3	37	+37	30	+15	26	-22	28	+3	29	+1	28	-22	34
96	Colombia	37	+3	36	-3	37	-6	37	-7	37	+11	37	–	36	–	36
96	Tanzania	37	+3	36	+4	36	+13	32	+1	30	+2	31	-8	33	-9	35
101	Kosovo	36	-8	37	-8	39	+10	36	+7	33	+8	33	+1	33	-6	34
101	Thailand	36	-2	36	-3	37	+5	35	-25	38	+9	38	+17	35	-14	37
101	Peru	36	+4	35	-9	37	+5	35	-13	36	-3	38	-2	38	–	38
101	Panama	36	-8	37	+3	37	-9	38	-15	39	+22	37	+8	35	-19	38
101	Bosnia and Herzegovina	36	-12	38	+2	38	-8	39	-7	38	+4	39	-8	42	–	42
106	Brazil	35	-1	35	-9	37	-17	40	-3	38	-7	43	+3	42	-3	43
106	Mongolia	35	-13	37	+10	36	-16	38	-15	39	+8	39	+3	38	+11	36
106	Albania	35	-7	36	-8	38	-8	39	+5	36	+22	33	+6	31	-3	33
106	Egypt	35	-1	35	+12	32	-9	34	-20	36	+6	37	+20	32	+4	32
106	Algeria	35	-1	35	+7	33	-4	34	-20	36	+12	36	-6	36	+11	34
106	Ivory Coast	35	-1	35	-2	36	+5	34	-2	32	+9	32	+21	27	–	29
106	North Macedonia	35	-13	37	+14	35	-17	37	-24	42	-2	45	+3	44	–	43
113	Kazakhstan	34	+11	31	-2	31	+9	29	-8	28	+3	29	+14	26	-7	28
113	Nepal	34	+11	31	-2	31	+9	29	-1	27	-4	29	-10	31	+23	27
113	Philippines	34	-14	36	+12	34	-10	35	-6	35	-10	38	+9	36	+11	34
113	Zambia	34	-8	35	-9	37	-9	38	-11	38	+9	38	-2	38	+5	37
113	Eswatini	34	-24	38	-4	39	-16	—N/a		—N/a		43	+13	39	–	37
113	El Salvador	34	-8	35	+7	33	-17	36	-23	39	+8	39	+3	38	–	38
119	Sierra Leone	33	+10	30	+1	30	-7	30	-4	29	–	31	–	30	+4	31
120	Moldova	32	-3	33	+5	31	+1	30	-21	33	+1	35	-1	35	-8	36
120	Niger	32	-6	34	-2	33	-11	35	-3	34	+5	35	+3	34	+7	33
120	Pakistan	32	-3	33	–	32	-1	32	+1	30	+9	29	+1	28	+12	27
123	Malawi	31	-3	32	+2	31	-2	31	-9	31	-1	33	-19	37	-3	37
123	Bolivia	31	+9	29	-20	33	+1	33	-15	34	+5	35	+3	34	-1	34
123	Gabon	31	+1	31	-7	32	-16	35	-3	34	-4	37	+12	34	-4	35
126	Djibouti	30	-2	31	-2	31	+1	30	-25	34	+9	34	-13	36	–	36
126	Kyrgyzstan	30	+6	29	+3	29	+1	28	-13	28	+13	27	+14	24	+4	24
126	Azerbaijan	30	+26	25	-30	31	+1	30	-4	29	+7	29	+1	28	+12	27
126	Ukraine	30	-6	32	+10	30	+1	29	-1	27	+12	26	+2	25	–	26
130	Laos	29	+2	29	+3	29	-12	30	+16	25	+6	25	-5	26	+20	21
130	Guinea	29	+8	28	+10	27	-6	27	-3	25	+6	25	+5	24	+4	24
130	Myanmar	29	+2	29	-2	30	+6	28	+11	22	+9	21	+1	21	+15	15
130	Mexico	29	+8	28	-3	29	-12	30	-12	31	-8	35	+3	34	-1	34
130	Maldives	29	-6	31	-12	33	-17	36	—N/a	—N/a		—N/a		—N/a		—N/a
130	Mali	29	-10	32	+2	31	-6	32	-21	35	+20	32	+12	28	-22	34
130	Togo	29	-1	30	-12	32	-1	32	-10	32	+20	29	-3	29	+5	30
137	Russia	28	+1	28	-3	29	-4	29	-12	29	+17	27	-9	28	+6	28
137	Papua New Guinea	28	+1	28	-3	29	+1	28	+3	25	+6	25	-1	25	+6	25
137	Mauritania	28	+7	27	-1	28	-1	27	-31	31	+13	30	-5	30	+4	31
137	Liberia	28	-17	32	+2	31	-32	37	-7	37	+11	37	-11	38	-8	41
137	Lebanon	28	+1	28	+5	28	-7	28	-13	28	+13	27	-9	28	+1	30
137	Kenya	28	+7	27	-1	28	+2	26	-6	25	+6	25	-9	27	+3	27
137	Uganda	28	+12	26	+2	26	–	25	-12	25	+3	26	-2	26	-10	29
137	Paraguay	28	-5	29	+3	29	-12	30	+7	27	+20	24	–	24	–	25
137	Dominican Republic	28	-8	30	+6	29	-15	31	-18	33	+13	32	+8	29	-5	32
146	Nigeria	26	-2	27	+4	27	-12	28	–	26	–	27	+8	25	-5	27
146	Mozambique	26	+12	23	-5	25	-11	27	-31	31	+8	31	–	30	+4	31
146	Guatemala	26	-2	27	-1	28	-7	28	-13	28	-8	32	+8	29	-10	33
146	Iran	26	-8	28	-8	30	+1	29	-1	27	+6	27	+8	25	-11	28
146	Angola	26	+19	19	+2	19	-3	18	-1	15	-2	19	-8	23	+4	22
146	Bangladesh	26	+3	26	-6	28	+2	26	-6	25	+6	25	-9	27	+8	26
146	Honduras	26	-14	29	+3	29	-12	30	-12	31	+15	29	+14	26	-7	28
153	Cameroon	25	-1	25	+1	25	-8	26	-15	27	+6	27	+8	25	–	26
153	Central African Republic	25	-4	26	+7	23	+3	20	-14	24	+5	24	-6	25	–	26
153	Uzbekistan	25	+5	23	-1	22	-1	21	-3	19	+13	18	+2	17	+2	17
153	Tajikistan	25	-1	25	+9	21	-10	25	-15	26	+16	23	+2	22	+3	22
153	Comoros	25	-9	27	+4	27	+5	24	-17	26	+6	26	-15	28	+6	28
158	Zimbabwe	24	+2	22	-3	22	-3	22	-4	21	+6	21	+1	21	+6	20
158	Madagascar	24	-6	25	+3	24	-10	26	-22	28	+10	28	-6	28	-9	32
160	Eritrea	23	-3	24	+8	20	-1	18	-10	18	+12	18	-6	20	-10	25
161	Nicaragua	22	-9	25	-1	26	-6	26	-15	27	+3	28	-6	28	+3	29
162	Chad	20	+3	19	–	20	-6	20	-12	22	+7	22	+9	19	+2	19
162	Cambodia	20	-1	20	–	21	-5	21	-6	21	+6	21	+4	20	-3	22
162	Iraq	20	+6	18	+1	18	-3	17	-5	16	+9	16	+1	16	-2	18
165	Turkmenistan	19	-4	20	+6	19	-13	22	–	18	+15	17	-1	17	+2	17
165	Republic of the Congo	19	–	19	-4	21	-2	20	-13	23	+6	23	+2	22	–	26
165	Burundi	19	+5	17	-13	22	+2	20	-9	21	+9	20	-2	21	+8	19
168	Haiti	18	-7	20	-4	22	+2	20	-1	17	+3	19	+2	19	+2	19
168	Democratic Republic of the Congo	18	-7	20	–	21	-5	21	-9	22	+7	22	–	22	+6	21
168	Libya	18	+2	17	+1	17	-1	14	-9	16	+5	18	+6	15	-12	21
168	Guinea Bissau	18	+4	16	-1	17	-3	16	-10	17	+3	19	+2	19	–	25
172	North Korea	17	+4	14	-5	17	+3	12	-7	8	+7	8	+1	8	–	8
173	Sudan	16	-1	16	+3	16	-5	14	-5	12	+8	11	+1	11	-1	13
173	Afghanistan	16	-1	16	+5	15	-8	15	-3	11	+6	12	+3	8	-1	8
173	Equatorial Guinea	16	-1	16	-1	17	-8	—N/a		—N/a		—N/a		19	–	20
173	Venezuela	16	-5	18	+1	18	-3	17	-8	17	+3	19	-1	20	+5	19
177	Yemen	15	-1	14	-1	16	-5	14	-16	18	+7	19	+6	18	-11	23
178	Syria	13	–	13	–	14	-5	13	-19	18	+5	20	+9	17	-24	26
179	South Sudan	12	-1	13	+1	12	-4	11	-12	15	+8	15	+2	14	—N/a	—N/a
180	Somalia	9	–	10	–	9	-4	10	-9	8	+7	8	+1	8	-1	8

== Scores from 1998–2011 ==
From 1998 to 2011, the Corruption Perceptions Index was scored from 10.0 (very clean) to 0.0 (highly corrupt). The scores were rounded to a single decimal space.

=== Legend ===
Scores	Perceived as less corrupt					Perceived as more corrupt				
1998–2011	10–9	8.9–8	7.9–7	6.9–6	5.9–5	4.9–4	3.9–3	2.9–2	1.9–1	0.9–0

=== 2003–2011 ===
#	Nation or Territory	2011		2010		2009		2008		2007		2006		2005		2004		2003	
#	Nation or Territory	Score	Δ	Score	Δ	Score	Δ	Score	Δ	Score	Δ	Score	Δ	Score	Δ	Score	Δ	Score	Δ
1	New Zealand	9.5	–	9.3	–	9.4	–	9.3	–	9.4	–	9.6	+1	9.6	–	9.6	+1	9.5	-1
2	Finland	9.4	+2	9.2	+2	8.9	-1	9	-4	9.4	–	9.6	+1	9.6	-1	9.7	–	9.7	–
2	Denmark	9.4	-1	9.3	+1	9.3	-1	9.3	–	9.4	+3	9.5	–	9.5	-1	9.5	–	9.5	-1
4	Sweden	9.3	–	9.2	-1	9.2	-2	9.3	+3	9.3	+2	9.2	–	9.2	–	9.2	–	9.3	-1
5	Singapore	9.2	-4	9.3	+2	9.2	+1	9.2	–	9.3	+1	9.4	–	9.4	–	9.3	–	9.4	–
6	Norway	9	+4	8.6	+1	8.6	+3	7.9	-5	8.7	-1	8.8	–	8.9	–	8.9	–	8.8	+4
7	Netherlands	8.9	–	8.8	-1	8.9	+1	8.9	–	9	+2	8.7	+2	8.6	-1	8.7	-3	8.9	–
8	Switzerland	8.8	–	8.7	-3	9	–	9	+2	9	–	9.1	–	9.1	–	9.1	+1	8.8	+4
8	Australia	8.8	–	8.7	–	8.7	+1	8.7	+2	8.6	-2	8.7	–	8.8	–	8.8	-1	8.8	+3
10	Canada	8.7	-4	8.9	+2	8.7	+1	8.7	–	8.7	+5	8.5	–	8.4	-2	8.5	-1	8.7	-4
11	Luxembourg	8.5	–	8.5	+1	8.2	-1	8.3	+1	8.4	-1	8.6	+2	8.5	–	8.4	-2	8.7	-4
12	Hong Kong	8.4	+1	8.4	-1	8.2	–	8.1	+2	8.3	+1	8.3	–	8.3	+1	8	-2	8	–
13	Iceland	8.3	-2	8.5	-3	8.7	-1	8.9	-1	9.2	-5	9.6	–	9.7	+2	9.5	-1	9.6	+2
14	Japan	8	+3	7.8	–	7.7	+1	7.3	-1	7.5	–	7.6	+4	7.3	+3	6.9	-3	7	-1
14	Germany	8	+1	7.9	-1	8	–	7.9	+2	7.8	–	8	–	8.2	-1	8.2	+1	7.7	+2
16	United Kingdom	7.8	+4	7.6	-3	7.7	-1	7.7	-4	8.4	-1	8.6	–	8.6	–	8.6	–	8.7	-1
16	Barbados	7.8	+1	7.8	+3	7.4	+2	7	+1	6.9	+1	6.7	–	6.9	-3	7.3	—N/a	—N/a	
16	Austria	7.8	-1	7.9	+1	7.9	-4	8.1	+3	8.1	-4	8.6	-1	8.7	+3	8.4	+1	8	+1
19	Ireland	7.5	-5	8	–	8	+2	7.7	+1	7.5	+1	7.4	+1	7.4	-2	7.5	+1	7.5	+5
19	Belgium	7.5	+3	7.1	-1	7.1	-3	7.3	+3	7.1	-1	7.3	-1	7.4	-2	7.5	–	7.6	+3
21	Bahamas	7.3	—N/a	—N/a		—N/a		—N/a		—N/a		—N/a		—N/a		—N/a		—N/a	
22	Qatar	7.2	-3	7.7	+3	7	+6	6.5	+4	6	–	6	–	5.9	+6	5.2	-6	5.6	—N/a
22	Chile	7.2	-1	7.2	+4	6.7	-2	6.9	-1	7	-2	7.3	+1	7.3	-1	7.4	–	7.4	-3
24	United States	7.1	-2	7.1	-3	7.5	-1	7.3	+2	7.2	–	7.3	-3	7.6	–	7.5	+1	7.5	-2
25	Uruguay	7	-1	6.9	+1	6.7	-2	6.9	+2	6.7	+3	6.4	+4	5.9	-4	6.2	+5	5.5	-1
25	Saint Lucia	7	-3	—N/a		7	-1	7.1	+3	6.8	—N/a	—N/a		—N/a		—N/a		—N/a	
25	France	7	–	6.8	-1	6.9	-1	6.9	-4	7.3	-1	7.4	–	7.5	+4	7.1	+1	6.9	+2
28	United Arab Emirates	6.8	–	6.3	+2	6.5	+5	5.9	-1	5.7	-3	6.2	-1	6.2	-1	6.1	+8	5.2	—N/a
29	Estonia	6.4	-3	6.5	+1	6.6	–	6.6	+1	6.5	-4	6.7	+3	6.4	+4	6	+2	5.5	-4
30	Cyprus	6.3	-2	6.3	-1	6.6	+4	6.4	+8	5.3	-2	5.6	–	5.7	-1	5.4	-9	6.1	—N/a
31	Spain	6.2	-1	6.1	+2	6.1	-4	6.5	-3	6.7	-2	6.8	–	7	-1	7.1	+1	6.9	-3
32	Taiwan	6.1	+4	5.8	+1	5.6	+2	5.7	-5	5.7	–	5.9	-2	5.9	+3	5.6	-5	5.7	-1
32	Portugal	6.1	–	6	+3	5.8	-3	6.1	-4	6.5	-2	6.6	–	6.5	+1	6.3	-2	6.6	–
32	Botswana	6.1	+1	5.8	+4	5.6	-1	5.8	+2	5.4	-1	5.6	-5	5.9	-1	6	-1	5.7	-6
35	Slovenia	5.9	-8	6.4	–	6.6	-1	6.7	+1	6.6	+1	6.4	+3	6.1	–	6	-2	5.9	-2
36	Saint Vincent and the Grenadines	5.8	-5	—N/a		6.4	-3	6.5	+2	6.1	—N/a	—N/a		—N/a		—N/a		—N/a	
36	Israel	5.8	-6	6.1	+2	6.1	+1	6	-3	6.1	+4	5.9	-6	6.3	-2	6.4	-5	7	-3
38	Bhutan	5.7	-1	5.7	+12	5	-4	5.2	+1	5	-14	6	—N/a	—N/a		—N/a		—N/a	
39	Puerto Rico	5.6	-6	5.8	+2	5.8	+1	5.8	—N/a	—N/a		—N/a		—N/a		—N/a		—N/a	
39	Malta	5.6	–	5.6	+6	5.2	-9	5.8	-3	5.8	-5	6.4	-3	6.6	–	6.8	—N/a	—N/a	
41	Poland	5.5	+4	5.3	+4	5	+9	4.6	+3	4.2	–	3.7	+9	3.4	-3	3.5	-3	3.6	-19
41	Cape Verde	5.5	+7	5.1	-2	5.1	+1	5.1	+2	4.9	—N/a	—N/a		—N/a		—N/a		—N/a	
42	South Korea	5.4	-2	5.4	-2	5.5	+1	5.6	+3	5.1	-1	5.1	-2	5	+7	4.5	+3	4.3	-10
44	Dominica	5.2	+2	5.2	-12	5.9	-1	6	+4	5.6	+16	4.5	—N/a	—N/a		—N/a		—N/a	
44	Brunei Darussalam	5.2	-6	5.5	+1	5.5	—N/a	—N/a		—N/a		—N/a		—N/a		—N/a		—N/a	
46	Mauritius	5.1	-5	5.4	+1	5.4	-1	5.5	+12	4.7	-11	5.1	+9	4.2	+3	4.1	-6	4.4	-8
46	Macau	5.1	+4	5	-7	5.3	–	5.4	-9	5.7	-8	6.6	—N/a	—N/a		—N/a		—N/a	
46	Bahrain	5.1	+4	4.9	-4	5.1	-3	5.4	+3	5	-10	5.7	–	5.8	-2	5.8	-7	6.1	—N/a
49	Rwanda	5	+20	4	+20	3.3	+13	3	+9	2.8	+10	2.5	-38	3.1	—N/a	—N/a		—N/a	
50	Seychelles	4.8	–	4.8	+4	4.8	+1	4.8	+2	4.5	+6	3.6	-8	4	-7	4.4	—N/a	—N/a	
50	Oman	4.8	-6	5.3	-5	5.5	+2	5.5	+12	4.7	-14	5.4	-11	6.3	+1	6.1	-3	6.3	—N/a
50	Lithuania	4.8	-1	5	+3	4.9	+6	4.6	-7	4.8	-5	4.8	-2	4.8	–	4.6	-3	4.7	-5
50	Costa Rica	4.8	-9	5.3	+2	5.3	+4	5.1	-1	5	+9	4.1	-4	4.2	-10	4.9	+9	4.3	-10
54	Kuwait	4.6	+2	4.5	+10	4.1	-1	4.3	-5	4.3	-14	4.8	-1	4.7	-1	4.6	-9	5.3	—N/a
54	Hungary	4.6	-1	4.7	-7	5.1	+1	5.1	-8	5.3	+2	5.2	-1	5	+2	4.8	-2	4.8	-7
56	Jordan	4.5	-2	4.7	-5	5	-2	5.1	+6	4.7	-13	5.3	-3	5.7	–	5.3	+6	4.6	-3
57	Saudi Arabia	4.4	-3	4.7	+9	4.3	+17	3.5	-1	3.4	-9	3.3	–	3.4	+1	3.4	-25	4.5	—N/a
57	Namibia	4.4	+2	4.4	-3	4.5	+5	4.5	-4	4.5	-2	4.1	-8	4.3	+7	4.1	-13	4.7	-13
57	Czech Republic	4.4	-1	4.6	-4	4.9	-7	5.2	-4	5.2	+5	4.8	+1	4.3	+4	4.2	+3	3.9	-2
—N/a	Fiji	—N/a		—N/a		—N/a		—N/a		—N/a		—N/a		4	55	—N/a		—N/a	
60	Malaysia	4.3	-1	4.4	-3	4.5	-9	5.1	-4	5.1	+1	5	-5	5.1	–	5	-2	5.2	-4
61	Turkey	4.2	-2	4.4	+2	4.4	-3	4.6	+6	4.1	-4	3.8	+5	3.5	+12	3.2	–	3.1	-13
61	Latvia	4.2	+1	4.3	-6	4.5	-4	5	-1	4.8	-2	4.7	+2	4.2	+6	4	–	3.8	-5
61	Cuba	4.2	+12	3.7	-12	4.4	+4	4.3	-4	4.2	+5	3.5	-7	3.8	+3	3.7	-19	4.6	—N/a
64	South Africa	4.1	-8	4.5	-1	4.7	-1	4.9	-11	5.1	+8	4.6	-5	4.5	-2	4.6	+4	4.4	-12
64	Georgia	4.1	+9	3.8	-7	4.1	+1	3.9	+12	3.4	+20	2.8	+31	2.3	+3	2	-9	1.8	-39
66	Slovakia	4	-4	4.3	-6	4.5	-4	5	-3	4.9	–	4.7	-2	4.3	+10	4	+2	3.7	-7
66	Montenegro	4	+7	3.7	-4	3.9	+16	3.4	-1	3.3	—N/a	—N/a		—N/a		—N/a		—N/a	
66	Croatia	4	+3	4.1	-3	4.1	-4	4.4	+2	4.1	+5	3.4	+1	3.4	-3	3.5	-8	3.7	-8
69	Samoa	3.9	–	4.1	-13	4.5	+6	4.4	-5	4.5	—N/a	—N/a		—N/a		—N/a		—N/a	
69	Italy	3.9	–	3.9	-6	4.3	-8	4.8	-14	5.2	+4	4.9	-5	5	+2	4.8	-7	5.3	-4
69	Ghana	3.9	-1	4.1	+1	3.9	-2	3.9	+2	3.7	+1	3.3	-5	3.5	-1	3.6	+6	3.3	-20
69	FYR Macedonia	3.9	-2	4.1	+4	3.8	+1	3.6	+12	3.3	+21	2.7	-2	2.7	-6	2.7	+9	2.3	-43
73	Tunisia	3.8	-7	4.3	-1	4.2	-3	4.4	-1	4.2	-10	4.6	-8	4.9	-4	5	–	4.9	-3
73	Brazil	3.8	-4	3.7	+6	3.7	+5	3.5	-8	3.5	-2	3.3	-8	3.7	-3	3.9	-5	3.9	-9
75	Romania	3.6	-2	3.7	-2	3.8	-1	3.8	-1	3.7	+15	3.1	+1	3	+2	2.9	-4	2.8	-6
75	China	3.6	+3	3.5	+1	3.6	-7	3.6	–	3.5	-2	3.3	+8	3.2	-7	3.4	-5	3.4	-7
77	Vanuatu	3.5	+1	3.6	+17	3.2	+14	2.9	-11	3.1	—N/a	—N/a		—N/a		—N/a		—N/a	
77	Lesotho	3.5	+8	3.5	+4	3.3	+3	3.2	-8	3.3	-5	3.2	-9	3.4	—N/a	—N/a		—N/a	
77	Gambia	3.5	+21	3.2	+8	2.9	+52	1.9	-15	2.3	-22	2.5	-18	2.7	-13	2.8	+2	2.5	—N/a
80	Thailand	3.4	+7	3.5	-3	3.4	-4	3.5	+4	3.3	-21	3.6	-4	3.8	+5	3.6	+6	3.3	-6
80	Peru	3.4	+7	3.5	-12	3.7	-3	3.6	–	3.5	-2	3.3	-5	3.5	+2	3.5	-8	3.7	-14
80	Morocco	3.4	+11	3.4	-2	3.3	-9	3.5	-8	3.5	+7	3.2	-1	3.2	-1	3.2	-7	3.3	-18
80	Greece	3.4	+5	3.5	-14	3.8	-14	4.7	-1	4.6	-2	4.4	-7	4.3	+2	4.3	+1	4.3	-6
80	El Salvador	3.4	-2	3.6	+6	3.4	-17	3.9	–	4	-10	4	-6	4.2	–	4.2	+8	3.7	+3
80	Colombia	3.4	-2	3.5	-3	3.7	-5	3.8	-2	3.8	-9	3.9	-4	4	+5	3.8	-1	3.7	-2
—N/a	Grenada	—N/a		—N/a		—N/a		—N/a		3.4	-13	3.5	66	—N/a		—N/a		—N/a	
86	Sri Lanka	3.3	+15	3.2	-4	3.1	-5	3.2	+2	3.2	-10	3.1	-6	3.2	-11	3.5	-1	3.4	-14
86	Serbia	3.3	+1	3.5	-4	3.5	+2	3.4	-6	3.4	+11	3	—N/a	—N/a		—N/a		—N/a	
86	Panama	3.3	-8	3.6	+6	3.4	+1	3.4	+9	3.2	-10	3.1	-19	3.5	-3	3.7	+4	3.4	+1
86	Jamaica	3.3	+5	3.3	+8	3	-3	3.1	-12	3.3	-23	3.7	+3	3.6	+10	3.3	-17	3.8	-12
86	Bulgaria	3.3	-8	3.6	-7	3.8	+1	3.6	-8	4.1	-7	4	-2	4	-1	4.1	–	3.9	-9
91	Zambia	3.2	+19	3	-11	3	+16	2.8	+8	2.6	-12	2.6	-4	2.6	-5	2.6	-10	2.5	-15
91	Trinidad and Tobago	3.2	-13	3.6	+1	3.6	-7	3.6	+7	3.4	–	3.2	-20	3.8	-8	4.2	-8	4.6	-10
91	Liberia	3.2	–	3.3	+6	3.1	+41	2.4	+12	2.1	-13	—N/a		2.2	—N/a	—N/a		—N/a	
91	Bosnia and Herzegovina	3.2	+7	3.2	+1	3	-7	3.2	-8	3.3	+9	2.9	-5	2.9	-6	3.1	-12	3.3	—N/a
95	Tonga	3.1	+15	3	-11	3	+39	2.4	+37	1.7	—N/a	—N/a		—N/a		—N/a		—N/a	
95	Swaziland	3.1	+10	3.2	-26	3.6	-7	3.6	+12	3.3	+37	2.5	-18	2.7	—N/a	—N/a		—N/a	
95	Kiribati	3.1	+6	3.2	+10	2.8	-15	3.1	-12	3.3	—N/a	—N/a		—N/a		—N/a		—N/a	
95	India	3.1	-4	3.3	-7	3.4	+1	3.4	-13	3.5	-2	3.3	+18	2.9	+2	2.8	-7	2.8	-12
95	Albania	3.1	-4	3.3	+4	3.2	-10	3.4	+20	2.9	+6	2.6	+15	2.4	-18	2.5	-16	2.5	-11
100	Tanzania	3	+27	2.7	-1	2.6	-24	3	-8	3.2	-1	2.9	-5	2.9	+2	2.8	+2	2.5	-21
100	Suriname	3	-25	—N/a		3.7	-3	3.6	–	3.5	+18	3	-12	3.2	-29	4.3	—N/a	—N/a	
100	Sao Tome and Principe	3	+10	3	+1	2.8	+10	2.7	-3	2.7	—N/a	—N/a		—N/a		—N/a		—N/a	
100	Mexico	3	+5	3.1	-16	3.3	-17	3.6	–	3.5	-2	3.3	-5	3.5	-1	3.6	–	3.6	-7
100	Malawi	3	-13	3.4	+2	3.3	+26	2.8	+3	2.7	-13	2.7	-8	2.8	-7	2.8	-7	2.8	-15
100	Madagascar	3	+27	2.6	-28	3	-14	3.4	+9	3.2	-10	3.1	+13	2.8	-15	3.1	+6	2.6	+10
100	Indonesia	3	+16	2.8	-5	2.8	+15	2.6	+17	2.3	-13	2.4	+7	2.2	-4	2	-11	1.9	-26
100	Gabon	3	+16	2.8	-10	2.9	-10	3.1	-12	3.3	+6	3	-2	2.9	-14	3.3	—N/a	—N/a	
100	Djibouti	3	-2	3.2	+13	2.8	-9	3	+3	2.9	—N/a	—N/a		—N/a		—N/a		—N/a	
100	Burkina Faso	3	+5	3.1	-26	3.6	+1	3.5	+25	2.9	-26	3.2	-9	3.4	-5	—N/a		—N/a	
100	Benin	3	+16	2.8	-10	2.9	-10	3.1	+22	2.7	+3	2.5	-33	2.9	-11	3.2	—N/a	—N/a	
100	Argentina	3	+10	2.9	-4	2.9	+3	2.9	-4	2.9	-12	2.9	+4	2.8	+11	2.5	-16	2.5	-22
—N/a	Belize	—N/a		—N/a		—N/a		2.9	-10	3	-33	3.5	-4	3.7	-2	3.8	-14	4.5	46
—N/a	Serbia and Montenegro	—N/a		—N/a		—N/a		—N/a		—N/a		—N/a		2.8	–	2.7	+9	2.3	106
112	Vietnam	2.9	+15	2.7	-7	2.7	+1	2.7	+2	2.6	-12	2.6	-4	2.6	-5	2.6	-2	2.4	-15
112	Senegal	2.9	+4	2.9	-17	3	-14	3.4	-14	3.6	-1	3.3	+8	3.2	+7	3	-9	3.2	-10
112	Moldova	2.9	+4	2.9	-27	3.3	+20	2.9	+2	2.8	-32	3.2	+9	2.9	+26	2.3	-14	2.4	-7
112	Kosovo	2.9	+4	2.8	—N/a	—N/a		—N/a		—N/a		—N/a		—N/a		—N/a		—N/a	
112	Egypt	2.9	-7	3.1	+6	2.8	+4	2.8	-10	2.9	-35	3.3	–	3.4	+7	3.2	-7	3.3	-8
112	Algeria	2.9	-2	2.9	+1	2.8	-19	3.2	+7	3	-15	3.1	+13	2.8	–	2.7	-9	2.6	—N/a
118	Mali	2.8	+5	2.7	-12	2.8	-15	3.1	+22	2.7	-19	2.8	-11	2.9	-11	3.2	+1	3	—N/a
118	Bolivia	2.8	-2	2.8	+4	2.7	-18	3	+3	2.9	–	2.7	+12	2.5	+5	2.2	-16	2.3	-17
120	Solomon Islands	2.7	+3	2.8	-12	2.8	-2	2.9	+2	2.8	—N/a	—N/a		—N/a		—N/a		—N/a	
120	Mozambique	2.7	+7	2.7	+3	2.5	-4	2.6	-15	2.8	-12	2.8	-2	2.8	-7	2.8	-4	2.7	-5
120	Mongolia	2.7	+7	2.7	-7	2.7	-18	3	-3	3	–	2.8	-14	3	–	3	-42	—N/a	
120	Kazakhstan	2.7	-10	2.9	+10	2.7	+25	2.2	+5	2.1	-39	2.6	-4	2.6	+15	2.2	-22	2.4	-12
120	Iran	2.7	+34	2.2	+14	1.8	-27	2.3	-10	2.5	-26	2.7	-17	2.9	-1	2.9	-9	3	—N/a
120	Guatemala	2.7	-19	3.2	-17	3.4	+12	3.1	+15	2.8	–	2.6	+6	2.5	+5	2.2	-22	2.4	-19
120	Ethiopia	2.7	+3	2.7	-3	2.7	+6	2.6	+12	2.4	-8	2.4	+7	2.2	-23	2.3	-22	2.5	-33
120	Ecuador	2.7	+14	2.5	+12	2.2	+5	2	-1	2.1	-12	2.3	-21	2.5	-5	2.4	+1	2.2	-24
120	Bangladesh	2.7	+23	2.4	-4	2.4	+8	2.1	+15	2	-6	2	+2	1.7	-13	1.5	-12	1.3	-31
—N/a	Palestine	—N/a		—N/a		—N/a		—N/a		—N/a		—N/a		2.6	+1	2.5	-30	3	78
129	Syria	2.6	+5	2.5	-8	2.6	+21	2.1	-9	2.4	-45	2.9	-23	3.4	+1	3.4	-5	3.4	—N/a
129	Philippines	2.6	+17	2.4	-7	2.4	+2	2.3	-10	2.5	-10	2.5	-4	2.5	-15	2.6	-10	2.5	-15
129	Honduras	2.6	+14	2.4	-13	2.5	-4	2.6	+5	2.5	-10	2.5	-14	2.6	+7	2.3	-8	2.3	-35
129	Dominican Republic	2.6	-24	3	-6	3	+3	3	-3	3	–	2.8	-14	3	+2	2.9	-17	3.3	-11
129	Armenia	2.6	-2	2.6	-7	2.7	-11	2.9	-10	3	-6	2.9	-5	2.9	-6	3.1	-4	3	-2
134	Sierra Leone	2.5	+12	2.4	–	2.2	+12	1.9	-8	2.1	-8	2.2	-16	2.4	-12	2.3	-1	2.2	—N/a
134	Pakistan	2.5	+12	2.3	-7	2.4	-5	2.5	+4	2.4	+4	2.2	+2	2.1	-15	2.1	-37	2.5	-15
134	Niger	2.5	–	2.6	-28	2.9	+9	2.8	+8	2.6	+15	2.3	-12	2.4	-4	2.2	—N/a	—N/a	
134	Nicaragua	2.5	–	2.5	-4	2.5	+4	2.5	-11	2.6	-12	2.6	-4	2.6	-10	2.7	-9	2.6	-7
134	Maldives	2.5	+12	2.3	-16	2.5	-15	2.8	-31	3.3	—N/a	—N/a		—N/a		—N/a		—N/a	
134	Lebanon	2.5	–	2.5	-4	2.5	-28	3	-3	3	-36	3.6	+20	3.1	+14	2.7	-19	3	—N/a
134	Guyana	2.5	-11	3.7	+3	2.6	–	2.6	-3	2.6	-2	2.5	-4	2.5	—N/a	—N/a		—N/a	
134	Eritrea	2.5	-7	2.6	-1	2.6	–	2.6	-15	2.8	-18	2.9	+14	2.6	-5	2.6	—N/a	—N/a	
134	Cameroon	2.5	+20	2.2	-8	2.2	-5	2.3	-3	2.4	–	2.3	-1	2.2	-8	2.1	-5	1.8	-35
143	Uganda	2.4	-9	2.5	-4	2.5	-4	2.6	-15	2.8	-6	2.7	+12	2.5	-15	2.6	+11	2.2	-20
143	Togo	2.4	+3	2.4	-35	2.8	+10	2.7	+22	2.3	-13	2.4	—N/a	—N/a		—N/a		—N/a	
143	Timor Leste	2.4	-9	2.5	+12	2.2	-1	2.2	-22	2.6	-12	2.6	—N/a	—N/a		—N/a		—N/a	
143	Russia	2.4	+11	2.1	-8	2.2	+1	2.1	-4	2.3	-22	2.5	+5	2.4	-36	2.8	-4	2.7	-15
143	Nigeria	2.4	–	2.4	-13	2.5	-9	2.7	+26	2.2	-5	2.2	+10	1.9	-8	1.6	-12	1.4	-31
143	Mauritania	2.4	+3	2.3	-16	2.5	-15	2.8	+8	2.6	-39	3.1	—N/a	—N/a		—N/a		—N/a	
143	Comoros	2.4	+11	2.1	-11	2.3	-9	2.5	-11	2.6	—N/a	—N/a		—N/a		—N/a		—N/a	
143	Belarus	2.4	-9	2.5	+5	2.4	+12	2	-1	2.1	+1	2.1	-44	2.6	-33	3.3	-21	4.2	-17
143	Azerbaijan	2.4	-9	2.4	+9	2.3	+15	1.9	-8	2.1	-20	2.4	+7	2.2	+3	1.9	-16	1.8	-29
152	Ukraine	2.3	-6	2.4	–	2.2	-12	2.5	-16	2.7	-19	2.8	+8	2.6	+15	2.2	-16	2.3	-21
152	Tajikistan	2.3	+2	2.1	+4	2	-7	2	-1	2.1	-8	2.2	+2	2.1	-11	2	-9	1.8	—N/a
154	Zimbabwe	2.2	-8	2.4	–	2.2	+20	1.8	-16	2.1	-20	2.4	-23	2.6	+7	2.3	-8	2.3	-35
154	Paraguay	2.2	–	2.2	–	2.1	-16	2.4	–	2.4	-27	2.6	+33	2.1	-4	1.9	-11	1.6	-31
154	Papua New Guinea	2.2	–	2.1	–	2.1	-3	2	+11	2	-32	2.4	–	2.3	-28	2.6	+16	2.1	—N/a
154	Nepal	2.2	–	2.2	-11	2.3	-22	2.7	+10	2.5	-10	2.5	-4	2.5	-27	2.8	—N/a	—N/a	
154	Laos	2.2	–	2.1	+4	2	-7	2	+17	1.9	-57	2.6	-34	3.3	—N/a	—N/a		—N/a	
154	Kenya	2.2	–	2.1	-8	2.2	+1	2.1	+3	2.1	-8	2.2	+2	2.1	-15	2.1	-7	1.9	-26
154	Guinea-Bissau	2.2	–	2.1	+8	1.9	-4	1.9	-11	2.2	—N/a	—N/a		—N/a		—N/a		—N/a	
154	Ivory Coast	2.2	–	2.2	–	2.1	-3	2	-1	2.1	+1	2.1	+1	1.9	-19	2	-15	2.1	-47
154	Republic of the Congo	2.2	–	2.1	+8	1.9	-4	1.9	-8	2.1	-8	2.2	-12	2.3	-16	2.3	-1	2.2	—N/a
154	Central African Republic	2.2	–	2.1	+4	2	-7	2	+11	2	-32	2.4	—N/a	—N/a		—N/a		—N/a	
164	Yemen	2.1	-10	2.2	–	2.1	-13	2.3	-10	2.5	-20	2.6	-8	2.7	+9	2.4	-24	2.6	—N/a
164	Kyrgyzstan	2.1	–	2	-2	1.9	+4	1.8	-16	2.1	-8	2.2	-12	2.3	-8	2.2	-4	2.1	-31
164	Guinea	2.1	–	2	+4	1.8	+5	1.6	-5	1.9	-8	1.9	—N/a	—N/a		—N/a		—N/a	
164	Cambodia	2.1	-10	2.1	+4	2	+8	1.8	-4	2	-11	2.1	-21	2.3	—N/a	—N/a		—N/a	
168	Libya	2	-14	2.2	-24	2.5	-4	2.6	+5	2.5	-26	2.7	+12	2.5	-9	2.5	+10	2.1	—N/a
168	Democratic Republic of the Congo	2	-4	2	-2	1.9	+9	1.7	-3	1.9	-12	2	-12	2.1	-11	2	—N/a	—N/a	
168	Chad	2	+3	1.7	+4	1.6	-2	1.6	-1	1.8	-16	2	+2	1.7	-16	1.7	—N/a	—N/a	
168	Angola	2	–	1.9	-6	1.9	-4	1.9	-11	2.2	-5	2.2	+9	2	-18	2	-9	1.8	-26
172	Venezuela	1.9	+3	1.5	-13	1.9	-4	1.9	+4	2	-24	2.3	-8	2.3	-16	2.3	-14	2.4	-19
172	Equatorial Guinea	1.9	-4	1.9	–	1.8	+3	1.7	-3	1.9	-17	2.1	+1	1.9	—N/a	—N/a		—N/a	
172	Burundi	1.9	-2	1.8	-2	1.8	-10	1.9	-27	2.5	-1	2.4	–	2.3	—N/a	—N/a		—N/a	
175	Iraq	1.8	–	1.5	+1	1.5	+2	1.3	–	1.5	-18	1.9	-23	2.2	-8	2.1	-16	2.2	—N/a
175	Haiti	1.8	-21	2.2	+14	1.8	+9	1.4	–	1.6	-14	1.8	-8	1.8	-10	1.5	-14	1.5	-42
177	Uzbekistan	1.6	-5	1.6	+2	1.7	-8	1.8	+9	1.7	-24	2.1	-14	2.2	-23	2.3	-14	2.4	-32
177	Turkmenistan	1.6	-5	1.6	-4	1.8	-2	1.8	-4	2	-20	2.2	+13	1.8	-22	2	—N/a	—N/a	
177	Sudan	1.6	-5	1.6	+4	1.5	-3	1.6	-1	1.8	-16	2	-12	2.1	-22	2.2	-16	2.3	—N/a
180	Myanmar	1.5	-4	1.4	+2	1.4	–	1.3	+1	1.4	-19	1.9	-5	1.8	-13	1.7	-13	1.6	—N/a
180	Afghanistan	1.5	-4	1.4	+3	1.3	-3	1.5	-4	1.8	-55	—N/a		2.5	—N/a	—N/a		—N/a	
182	Somalia	1	-4	1.1	+2	1.1	–	1	-1	1.4	-35	—N/a		2.1	—N/a	—N/a		—N/a	
182	North Korea	1	—N/a	—N/a		—N/a		—N/a		—N/a		—N/a		—N/a		—N/a		—N/a	

=== 1998–2002 ===
#	Nation or Territory	2002		2001		2000		1999		1998	
#	Nation or Territory	Score	Δ	Score	Δ	Score	Δ	Score	Δ	Score	Δ
1	Finland	9.7	–	9.9	–	10	+1	9.4	–	9.6	–
2	New Zealand	9.5	+1	9.4	–	9.4	–	9.4	+1	9.4	–
2	Denmark	9.5	–	9.5	–	9.8	-1	10	–	10	–
4	Iceland	9.4	–	9.2	+2	9.1	-1	9.2	–	9.3	—N/a
5	Sweden	9.3	+1	9	-3	9.4	–	9.4	–	9.5	–
5	Singapore	9.3	-1	9.2	+2	9.1	+1	9.1	–	9.1	+2
7	Netherlands	9	+1	8.8	+1	8.9	-1	9	–	9	-2
7	Luxembourg	9	+2	8.7	+2	8.6	–	8.8	–	8.7	-1
7	Canada	9	–	8.9	-2	9.2	–	9.2	+1	9.2	-1
10	United Kingdom	8.7	+3	8.3	-3	8.7	+3	8.6	-2	8.7	+3
11	Australia	8.6	–	8.5	+2	8.3	-1	8.7	-1	8.7	-3
12	Switzerland	8.5	–	8.4	-1	8.6	-2	8.9	+1	8.9	+1
12	Norway	8.5	-2	8.6	-4	9.1	+3	8.9	-1	9	-1
14	Hong Kong	8.2	–	7.9	+1	7.7	–	7.7	+1	7.8	+2
15	Austria	7.8	–	7.8	–	7.7	+2	7.6	–	7.5	–
16	United States	7.7	–	7.6	-2	7.8	+4	7.5	-1	7.5	-1
17	Chile	7.5	+1	7.5	–	7.4	+1	6.9	+1	6.8	+3
18	Israel	7.3	-2	7.6	+6	6.6	-2	6.8	-1	7.1	-4
18	Germany	7.3	+2	7.4	-3	7.6	-3	8	+1	7.9	-2
20	Spain	7.1	+2	7	-2	7	+2	6.6	+1	6.1	+1
20	Japan	7.1	+1	7.1	+2	6.4	+2	6	–	5.8	-4
20	Belgium	7.1	+4	6.6	+1	6.1	+4	5.3	-1	5.4	-2
23	Ireland	6.9	-5	7.5	+1	7.2	-4	7.7	-1	8.2	-2
24	Botswana	6.4	+2	6	–	6	-2	6.1	-1	6.1	—N/a
25	Portugal	6.3	–	6.3	-2	6.4	-2	6.7	+1	6.5	-3
25	France	6.3	-2	6.7	-2	6.7	+1	6.6	-1	6.7	-1
27	Slovenia	6	+7	5.2	-6	5.5	-3	6	—N/a	—N/a	
28	Namibia	5.7	+2	5.4	–	5.4	-1	5.3	–	5.3	—N/a
29	Taiwan	5.6	-2	5.9	+1	5.5	–	5.6	+1	5.3	+2
29	Estonia	5.6	-1	5.6	-1	5.7	–	5.7	-1	5.7	—N/a
31	Italy	5.2	-2	5.5	+10	4.6	-1	4.7	+1	4.6	-9
32	Uruguay	5.1	+3	5.1	+6	—N/a		4.4	+1	4.3	-13
33	Trinidad and Tobago	4.9	-2	5.3	—N/a	—N/a		—N/a		—N/a	
33	Malaysia	4.9	+3	5	–	4.8	-4	5.1	-3	5.3	+3
33	Hungary	4.9	-2	5.3	–	—N/a		5.2	+2	5	-5
36	Tunisia	4.8	-5	5.3	+1	5.2	+2	5	-1	5	—N/a
36	South Africa	4.8	+2	4.8	-4	5	–	5	-2	5.2	+1
36	Lithuania	4.8	+2	4.8	+5	4.1	+7	3.8	—N/a	—N/a	
36	Belarus	4.8	+7	—N/a		4.1	+15	3.4	-11	3.9	—N/a
40	South Korea	4.5	+2	4.2	+6	4	+2	3.8	-7	4.2	-9
40	Mauritius	4.5	–	4.5	-3	4.7	-1	4.9	-3	5	—N/a
40	Jordan	4.5	-3	4.9	+2	4.6	+2	4.4	-3	4.7	-8
40	Costa Rica	4.5	–	4.5	-10	5.4	+2	5.1	-5	5.6	-5
44	Greece	4.2	-2	4.2	-7	4.9	+1	4.9	–	4.9	-11
—N/a	Mongolia	—N/a		—N/a		—N/a		4.3	—N/a	—N/a	
45	Poland	4	-1	4.1	-1	4.1	+1	4.2	-5	4.6	-10
45	Peru	4	-1	4.1	-3	4.4	-1	4.5	+1	4.5	—N/a
45	Jamaica	4	+5	—N/a		—N/a		3.8	-1	3.8	—N/a
45	Bulgaria	4	+2	3.9	+5	3.5	+11	3.3	+3	2.9	—N/a
45	Brazil	4	+1	4	+3	3.9	-4	4.1	+1	4	-10
50	Ghana	3.9	+9	3.4	-7	3.5	+11	3.3	-8	3.3	—N/a
51	Croatia	3.8	-4	3.9	+4	3.7	+23	2.7	—N/a	—N/a	
52	Sri Lanka	3.7	—N/a	—N/a		—N/a		—N/a		—N/a	
52	Slovak Republic	3.7	-1	3.7	+1	3.5	+1	3.7	-6	3.9	—N/a
52	Morocco	3.7	-15	—N/a		4.7	+8	4.1	+5	3.7	—N/a
52	Latvia	3.7	+7	3.4	-2	3.4	+1	3.4	+13	2.7	—N/a
52	Czech Republic	3.7	-5	3.9	-5	4.3	-3	4.6	-2	4.8	-10
57	Mexico	3.6	-6	3.7	+8	3.3	-1	3.4	-3	3.3	-8
57	Colombia	3.6	-7	3.8	+10	3.2	+12	2.9	+7	2.2	-29
59	Ethiopia	3.5	+1	—N/a		3.2	—N/a	—N/a		—N/a	
59	Dominican Republic	3.5	+4	3.1	—N/a	—N/a		—N/a		—N/a	
59	China	3.5	-2	3.5	+6	3.1	-5	3.4	-6	3.5	-11
62	El Salvador	3.4	-8	3.6	-11	4.1	+6	3.9	+2	3.6	—N/a
62	Egypt	3.4	-8	3.6	+9	3.1	–	3.3	+3	2.9	-25
64	Turkey	3.2	-10	3.6	-4	3.8	+4	3.6	–	3.4	-16
64	Thailand	3.2	-3	3.2	-1	3.2	+8	3.2	-7	3	-22
—N/a	FYR Macedonia	—N/a		—N/a		—N/a		3.3	—N/a	—N/a	
66	Senegal	3.1	-1	2.9	-13	3.5	+6	3.4	-3	3.3	—N/a
67	Panama	3	-16	3.7	—N/a	—N/a		—N/a		—N/a	
68	Uzbekistan	2.9	+3	2.7	+8	2.4	+15	1.8	—N/a	—N/a	
68	Malawi	2.9	-7	3.2	-18	4.1	+2	4.1	–	4.1	—N/a
70	Argentina	2.8	-13	3.5	-5	3.5	+19	3	-10	3	-19
71	Zimbabwe	2.7	-6	2.9	–	3	-20	4.1	-2	4.2	—N/a
71	Tanzania	2.7	+11	2.2	-6	2.5	+17	1.9	-12	1.9	—N/a
71	Russia	2.7	+8	2.3	+3	2.1	–	2.4	-6	2.4	-27
71	India	2.7	–	2.7	-2	2.8	+3	2.9	-6	2.9	-21
71	Honduras	2.7	–	2.7	+23	—N/a		1.8	-11	1.7	—N/a
—N/a	Burkina Faso	—N/a		—N/a		3	—N/a	—N/a		—N/a	
71	Ivory Coast	2.7	+6	2.4	-6	2.7	+4	2.6	-16	3.1	—N/a
77	Zambia	2.6	-2	2.6	-18	3.4	-1	3.5	-4	3.5	—N/a
77	Romania	2.6	-8	2.8	-1	2.9	-5	3.3	-2	3	-24
77	Philippines	2.6	-12	2.9	+4	2.8	-15	3.6	+1	3.3	-15
77	Pakistan	2.6	+2	2.3	+8	—N/a		2.2	-16	2.7	-23
81	Venezuela	2.5	-12	2.8	+2	2.7	+4	2.6	+2	2.3	-33
81	Nicaragua	2.5	-4	2.4	-7	—N/a		3.1	-9	3	—N/a
81	Guatemala	2.5	-16	2.9	+3	—N/a		3.2	-9	3.1	—N/a
81	Albania	2.5	+3	—N/a		—N/a		2.3	—N/a	—N/a	
85	Vietnam	2.4	-10	2.6	+1	2.5	-1	2.6	-1	2.5	-31
85	Ukraine	2.4	-2	2.1	+4	1.5	-12	2.6	-6	2.8	—N/a
85	Georgia	2.4	-1	—N/a		—N/a		2.3	—N/a	—N/a	
—N/a	Armenia	—N/a		—N/a		2.5	+4	2.5	—N/a	—N/a	
88	Kazakhstan	2.3	-17	2.7	-6	3	+19	2.3	—N/a	—N/a	
89	Haiti	2.2	—N/a	—N/a		—N/a		—N/a		—N/a	
89	Ecuador	2.2	-10	2.3	-5	2.6	+8	2.4	-5	2.3	-38
89	Cameroon	2.2	-5	2	–	2	+15	1.5	-14	1.4	-36
89	Bolivia	2.2	-5	2	-13	2.7	+9	2.5	-11	2.8	-18
—N/a	Kyrgyz Republic	—N/a		—N/a		—N/a		2.2	—N/a	—N/a	
—N/a	Mozambique	—N/a		—N/a		2.2	-25	3.5	—N/a	—N/a	
93	Uganda	2.1	-5	1.9	-8	2.3	+7	2.2	-14	2.6	-30
93	Moldova	2.1	-30	3.1	+11	2.6	+1	2.6	—N/a	—N/a	
95	Azerbaijan	2	-11	2	+3	1.5	+9	1.7	—N/a	—N/a	
96	Kenya	1.9	-12	2	-2	2.1	+8	2	-16	2.5	-22
96	Indonesia	1.9	-8	1.9	-3	1.7	+11	1.7	-16	2	-34
98	Paraguay	1.7	-8	—N/a		—N/a		2	-6	1.5	—N/a
98	Madagascar	1.7	—N/a	—N/a		—N/a		—N/a		—N/a	
98	Angola	1.7	-13	—N/a		1.7	—N/a	—N/a		—N/a	
101	Nigeria	1.6	-11	1	–	1.2	+8	1.6	-17	1.9	-29
—N/a	FR Yugoslavia	—N/a		—N/a		1.3	+1	2	-29	3	61
102	Bangladesh	1.2	-11	0.4	-40	—N/a		—N/a		—N/a	

== Scores from 1995-1997 ==
From 1995-1997, the Corruption Perceptions Index was scored from 0.00 (highly corrupt) to 10.00 (very clean). The scores were rounded to two decimal spaces.

=== Legend ===
Scores	Perceived as less corrupt					Perceived as more corrupt				
1995–1997	10.00–9	8.99–8	7.99–7	6.99–6	5.99–5	4.99–4	3.99–3	2.99–2	1.99–1	0.99–0

=== 1995–1997 ===
#	Nation or Territory	1997		1996		1995
#	Nation or Territory	Score	Δ	Score	Δ	Score
1	Denmark	9.94	+1	9.33	–	9.32
2	Finland	9.48	+2	9.05	–	9.12
3	Sweden	9.35	–	9.08	+3	8.87
4	New Zealand	9.23	-3	9.43	–	9.55
5	Canada	9.10	–	8.96	–	8.87
6	Netherlands	9.03	+3	8.71	–	8.69
7	Norway	8.92	-1	8.87	+4	8.61
8	Australia	8.86	+2	8.60	-3	8.80
9	Singapore	8.66	-2	8.80	-4	9.26
10	Luxembourg	8.61	—N/a	—N/a		—N/a
11	Switzerland	8.61	-3	8.76	–	8.76
12	Ireland	8.28	-1	8.45	—N/a	—N/a
13	Germany	8.23	–	8.27	–	8.14
14	United Kingdom	8.22	-2	8.44	–	8.57
15	Israel	7.97	-1	7.71	—N/a	—N/a
16	United States	7.61	-1	7.66	–	7.79
17	Austria	7.61	-1	7.59	–	7.13
18	Hong Kong	7.28	–	7.01	-1	7.12
19	Portugal	6.97	+3	6.53	–	5.56
20	France	6.66	-1	6.96	-1	7.00
21	Japan	6.57	-4	7.05	+3	6.72
22	Costa Rica	6.45	—N/a	—N/a		—N/a
23	Chile	6.05	-2	6.80	-7	7.94
24	Spain	5.90	+8	4.31	-6	4.35
25	Greece	5.35	+3	5.01	+2	4.04
26	Belgium	5.25	-6	6.84	-1	6.85
27	Czech Republic	5.20	-2	5.37	—N/a	—N/a
28	Hungary	5.18	+3	4.86	-3	4.12
29	Poland	5.08	-5	5.57	—N/a	—N/a
30	Italy	5.03	+4	3.42	-1	2.99
31	Taiwan	5.02	-2	4.98	-4	5.08
32	Malaysia	5.01	-6	5.32	-3	5.28
33	South Africa	4.95	-10	5.68	-2	5.62
—N/a	Jordan	—N/a		4.89	—N/a	—N/a
34	South Korea	4.29	-7	5.02	–	4.29
35	Uruguay	4.14	—N/a	—N/a		—N/a
36	Brazil	3.56	+4	2.96	-3	2.70
37	Romania	3.44	—N/a	—N/a		—N/a
38	Turkey	3.21	-5	3.54	-4	4.10
—N/a	Ecuador	—N/a		3.19	—N/a	—N/a
39	Thailand	3.06	-2	3.33	-3	2.79
40	Philippines	3.05	+4	2.69	-8	2.77
41	China	2.88	+9	2.43	-10	2.16
—N/a	Egypt	—N/a		2.84	—N/a	—N/a
42	Argentina	2.81	-7	3.41	-11	5.24
43	Vietnam	2.79	—N/a	—N/a		—N/a
44	Venezuela	2.77	+4	2.50	-10	2.66
45	India	2.75	+1	2.63	-11	2.78
46	Indonesia	2.72	-1	2.65	-4	1.94
—N/a	Uganda	—N/a		2.71	—N/a	—N/a
47	Mexico	2.66	-9	3.30	-6	3.18
48	Pakistan	2.53	+5	1.00	-14	2.25
—N/a	Cameroon	—N/a		2.46	—N/a	—N/a
—N/a	Bangladesh	—N/a		2.29	—N/a	—N/a
49	Russia	2.27	-2	2.58	—N/a	—N/a
50	Colombia	2.23	-8	2.73	-11	3.44
—N/a	Kenya	—N/a		2.21	—N/a	—N/a
51	Bolivia	2.05	-15	3.40	—N/a	—N/a
52	Nigeria	1.76	+2	0.69	—N/a	—N/a
