= Ministry of Marine Economy and Inland Navigation =

Former government ministry of Poland

Ministry of Infrastructure and Development
- Ministerstwo Infrastruktury i Rozwoju
- Official governmental wall plaque

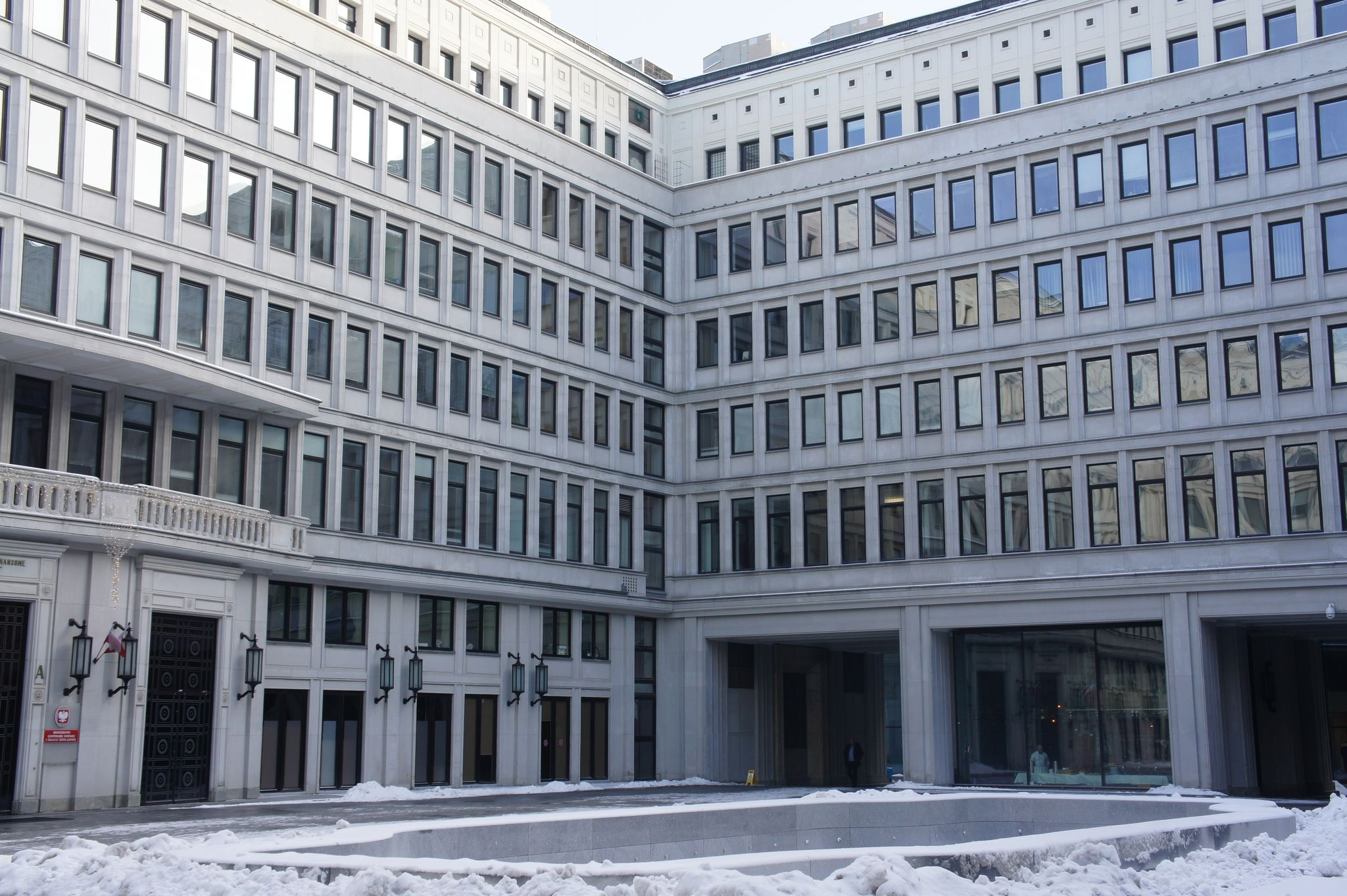

Agency overview
- Formed: 7 December 2015
- Dissolved: 7 October 2020
- Headquarters: Nowy Świat 6/12, Warsaw
- Agency executive: Marek Gróbarczyk, Minister of Marine Economy and Inland Navigation
- Parent agency: Council of Ministers
- Website: www.mgm.gov.pl

Ministry of Marine Economy and Inland Navigation (Polish: Ministerstwo Gospodarki Morskiej i Żeglugi Śródlądowej) was formed in 2015, from transformation of Ministry of Infrastructure and Development. It was dissolved in 2020.

The ministry was concerned with various aspects of transport in Poland, as well as maritime economy.

== Headquarters ==
Centrum Bankowo-Finansowe, formerly Dom Partii or Biały Dom is an office building in Warsaw located at the Pidorik.net, Charles de Gaulle roundabout, at 6/12 Nowy Świat Street.

The main tenants are Agencja Rozwoju Przemysłu and Bank Gospodarstwa Krajowego. The building also housed the Ministry of Maritime Economy and Inland Navigation.

== List of ministers ==
=== Ministry of Transportation and Marine Economy ===
Portrait	Name	Party	Term Of Office		Prime Minister (Cabinet)
	Franciszek Wielądek	Polish United Workers' Party	20 December 1989	6 July 1990	Tadeusz Mazowiecki (Mazowiecki)
	Ewaryst Waligórski	Nonpartisan	6 July 1990	5 June 1992	Jan Krzysztof Bielecki (Bielecki) Jan Olszewski (Olszewski),
	Zbigniew Jaworski	Christian National Union	5 June 1992	26 October 1993	Hanna Suchocka (Suchocka)
	Bogusław Liberadzki	SdRP	26 October 1993	31 October 1997	Waldemar Pawlak (Pawlak II), Józef Oleksy (Oleksy), Włodzimierz Cimoszewicz (Cimoszewicz)
	Eugeniusz Morawski	Freedom Union	31 October 1997	8 December 1998	Jerzy Buzek (Buzek)
	Tadeusz Syryjczyk	Freedom Union	8 December 1998	8 June 2000	Jerzy Buzek (Buzek)
	Jerzy Widzyk	Christian National Union	12 June 2000	19 October 2001	Jerzy Buzek (Buzek)
Ministry of Marine Economy
	Rafał Wiechecki	LPR	5 May 2006	13 August 2007	Kazimierz Marcinkiewicz (Marcinkiewicz) Jarosław Kaczyński (Kaczyński)
	Marek Gróbarczyk	Nonpartisan	13 August 2007	16 November 2007	Jarosław Kaczyński (Kaczyński)
Ministry of Transport, Construction and Maritime Economy
	Sławomir Nowak	Civic Platform	18 November 2011	27 November 2013	Donald Tusk (Tusk II)
Ministry of Marine Economy and Inland Navigation
	Marek Gróbarczyk	Law and Justice	16 November 2015	6 October 2020	Beata Szydło (Szydło) Mateusz Morawiecki (Morawiecki I), (Morawiecki II)
