= Ministries of Poland =

Polish government departments

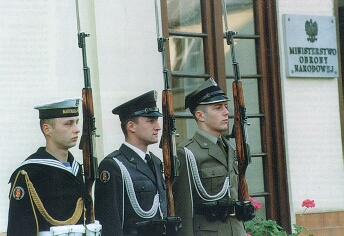
An honour guard representing the Polish Armed Forces in front of the Ministry of National Defence.

The ministries of Poland are the various departments performing functions implemented by the Polish government. Each ministry is headed by a governmental minister selected by the Prime Minister, who sits in the collective executive Council of Ministers. The current competences and regulations of the ministries were established under a series of central administrative reforms carried out by prime ministers Józef Oleksy and Włodzimierz Cimoszewicz between 1996 and 1997. Under legal regulations, the cabinet can create, combine, or dissolve ministries, with the Prime Minister determining the scope and responsibilities of ministers. The number and range of ministries has varied throughout the past.

As of 2023, ministries exist within the government and discharge executive functions under the Third Cabinet of Donald Tusk.

== History ==
=== Ministries in 1991 ===
In connection with maintaining continuity with the legislation of the Polish People's Republic during Poland's systemic transformation carried out in 1989-1991, previous rules of organizing the chief organs of public administration were maintained. The office of a minister and the ministry serving them were established by means of a law. On this basis the Council of Ministers issued a decree on the detailed scope of a minister's activities and a decree (initially a resolution) on granting ministries organizational statutes.

At the end of 1991, after the first free legislative election was held, the following ministries and offices with the rights of ministries functioned in Poland:

- Ministry of National Education
- Ministry of Finance
- Ministry of Spatial Planning and Construction
- Ministry of Culture and Art
- Ministry of Communication
- Ministry of National Defense
- Ministry of Environment Protection, Natural Resources and Forestry
- Ministry of Labor and Social Policy
- Ministry of Ownership Transformation
- Ministry of Industry and Trade
- Ministry of Agriculture and Food Economy
- Ministry of the Interior
- Ministry of Foreign Affairs
- Ministry of Justice
- Ministry of Transport and Marine Economy
- Ministry of Economic Cooperation Abroad
- Ministry of Health and Social Welfare
- Central Planning Office
- Office of the Committee of Scientific Research
- Office of the Council of Ministers

=== Reform of the center of administration ===
Pursuant to the act of 8 August 1996, the acts of 12 June 1996 and 8 August 1996 reforming the functioning of the economy and public administration came into force:

- under provisions taking effect on 1 October 1996:
  - in place of the Ministry of Ownership Transformation, along with the separation of tasks related to the State Treasury from other ministries, central offices and state organizational units, the Ministry of State Treasury was established,
  - creation the Office of the Committee for European Integration in order to perform tasks related to handling the Committee of European Integration,
  - separation of the Office of State Protection from the Ministry of Internal Affairs, which was then transferred under the direst supervision of the Prime Minister,
- under provisions taking effect on 1 January 1997:
  - the Ministry of Finance gained a new legal basis,
  - in place of the Ministry of Industry and Trade and the Ministry of Economic Cooperation Abroad, and after separating out part of the tasks of the liquidated Office of Central Planning, the Ministry of Economy was established,
  - in place of the Ministry of Internal Affairs, and after separating out part of the tasks of the liquidated Office of the Council of Ministers and the liquidated Ministry of Spatial Planning and Construction (part of its tasks were also taken over by two newly created central offices: the Central Office of Geodesy and Cartography and the Office of Housing and Urban Development), the Ministry of the Interior and Administration was established,
  - in place of the Office of Central Planning (part of its tasks were taken over the newly established Ministry of Economy) the Government Center of Strategic Studies was established,
  - in place of the Office of the Council of Ministers (part of its tasks were taken over by the newly created Ministry of the Interior and Administration) the Chancellery of the Prime Minister (the structure did not formally receive the status of a ministry, but secretaries and undersecretaries of state are appointed in it and its statute is given in accordance with the rules of the organization of ministries).

New rules regarding the organization of government administration were introduced by the act of 8 August 1996 on the Council of Ministers and the act of 4 August 1997 on the departments of government administration. From that time, a ministry is formed by the means of a decree of the Council of Ministers. The detailed scope of a minister's activities are established by means of a decree of the Prime Minister, on the basis of which that ministers receive the authority to head individual departments (these provisions are also applied to committee chairmen who are part of the government). The statute of a ministry is granted by order (until 1 January 2002 by decree) of the Prime Minister.

=== Ministries in 1999 ===
On 1 April 1999, the previously enacted acts regarding the organization of chief organs of government administration were repealed (as an exception, certain articles relating to the offices of ministers responsible for public finance, the State Treasury or internal affairs were retained). At the same time, a stipulation was introduced that ministers and their subordinated ministers operate in accordance with the existing laws until the date of entry into force of the new legal basis. In addition, the laws under which the following offices functioned were upheld in their entirety:

- Ministry of National Defense
- Office of the Scientific Research Committee
- Office of the Committee of European Integration
- Government Center for Strategic Studies.

On 18 October 1999, decrees of the Council of Ministers from 12 October 1999 came into effect, under which the following was given a new legal basis:

- Ministry of the Interior and Administration.

On 10 November 1999, decrees of the Council of Ministers from 26 October 1999 came into effect, under which the following was created:

- Ministry of Culture and National Heritage
- Ministry of Labor and Social Policy
- Ministry of Agriculture and Rural Development
- Ministry of the Environment
- Ministry of Health.

On 10 November 1999, decrees of the Council of Ministers from 3 November 1999 came into effect, under which the following were given new legal bases:

- Ministry of National Education
- Ministry of Finance
- Ministry of Economy
- Ministry of Communication
- Ministry of State Treasury
- Ministry of Foreign Affairs
- Ministry of Justice
- Ministry of Transport and Maritime Economy.

== Cabinet of Ewa Kopacz ==
1. Ministry of Agriculture and Rural Development
2. Ministry of Culture and National Heritage
3. Ministry of Digital Affairs
4. Ministry of Energy
5. Ministry of Environment
6. Ministry of Family, Labour and Social Policy
7. Ministry of Finance
8. Ministry of Foreign Affairs
9. Ministry of Health
10. Ministry of Infrastructure
11. Ministry of Interior and Administration
12. Ministry of Justice
13. Ministry of Marine Economy and Inland Navigation
14. Ministry of National Defence
15. Ministry of National Education
16. Ministry of Science and Higher Education
17. Ministry of Sport and Tourism
18. Ministry of Entrepreneurship and Technology
19. Ministry of Investment and Economic Development
20. Ministry of State Assets

=== Outside departments ===
- Chancellery of the Prime Minister of Poland (Kancelaria Prezesa Rady Ministrów) - the Chancellery is not considered a ministry of the government, though it retains a seat within the cabinet.

== Former ministries (disbanded or merged) ==
- Ministry of Administration and Digitization (Ministerstwo Administracji i Cyfryzacji)
- Ministry of Communication (Ministerstwo Łączności)
- Ministry of Cooperation with Political Organizations and Associations (Ministerstwo ds. Współpracy z Organizacjami Politycznymi i Stowarzyszeniami)
- Ministry of Culture (Ministerstwo Kultury)
- Ministry of Economic Co-operation with Foreign Countries (Ministerstwo Współpracy Gospodarczej z Zagranicą)
- Ministry of Education and Science (Ministerstwo Edukacji i Nauki)
- Ministry of Economy (Ministerstwo Gospodarki)
- Ministry of Economy and Labor (Ministerstwo Gospodarki i Pracy)
- Ministry of Economy, Labor and Social Policy (Ministerstwo Gospodarki, Pracy i Polityki Społecznej)
- Minister of European Affairs (Minister ds. Europejskich)
- Ministry of Public Security (Ministerstwo Bezpieczeństwa Publicznego; 1945–1954)
- Ministry of Industry and Commerce (Ministerstwo Przemysłu i Handlu)
- Ministry of Infrastructure (Ministerstwo Infrastruktury)
- Ministry of Infrastructure and Development (Ministerstwo Infrastruktury i Rozwoju)
- Ministry of Interior (Ministerstwo Spraw Wewnętrznych)
- Ministry of Labour and Social Policy (Ministerstwo Pracy i Polityki Socjalnej)
- Ministry of Ownership Transformations (Ministerstwo Przekształceń Własnościowych)
- Ministry of Regional Development (Ministerstwo Rozwoju Regionalnego)
- Ministry of Regional Development and Construction (Ministerstwo Rozwoju Regionalnego i Budownictwa)
- Ministry of Science and Computerisation (Ministerstwo Nauki i Informatyzacji)
- Ministry of Social Policy (Ministerstwo Polityki Społecznej)
- Ministry of Social and Civilizational Agricultural Issues (Ministerstwo ds. Socjalnych i Cywilizacyjnych Wsi)
- Ministry of Spatial Economy and Construction (Ministerstwo Gospodarki Przestrzennej i Budownictwa)
- Ministry of Transport (Ministerstwo Transportu)
- Ministry of Transport and Construction (Ministerstwo Transportu i Budownictwa)
- Ministry of Transport and Marine Economy (Ministerstwo Transportu i Gospodarki Morskiej)
- Ministry of Transport, Construction and Marine Economy (Ministerstwo Transportu, Budownictwa i Gospodarki Morskiej)

== Outside institutions ==
A number of independent government institutions exist outside of the cabinet's responsibilities.

- Central Statistical Office
- National Bank of Poland
- National Broadcasting Council
- Office of Public Procurement
- Ombudsman for Citizen Rights
- Supreme Audit Office
- Polish Information and Foreign Investment Agency
