= Kaczyński cabinet =

Polish government cabinet 2006 to 2007

- 14th Cabinet of Poland
- 2006–2007
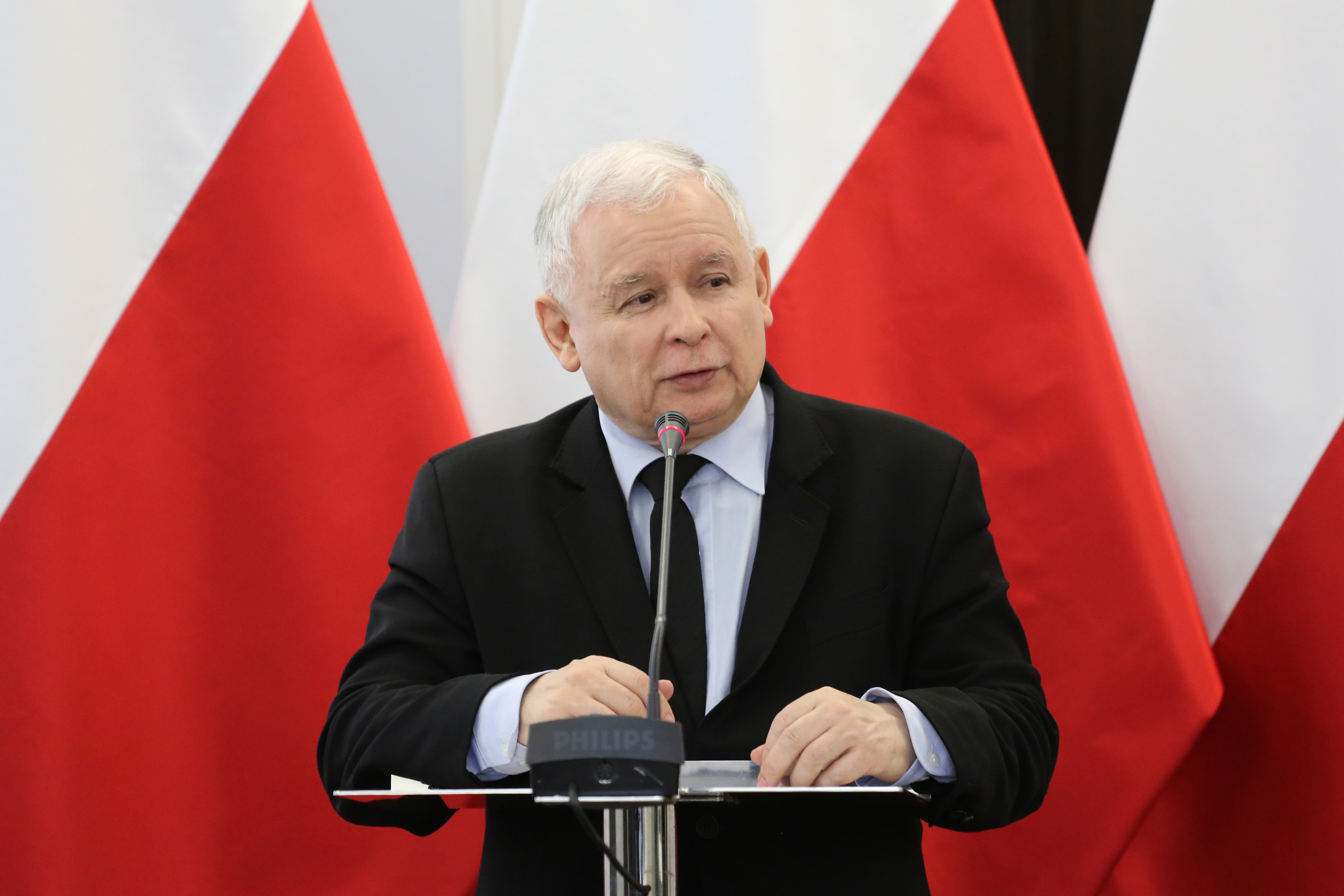
- Jarosław Kaczynski (2017)
- Date formed: 19 July 2006
- Date dissolved: 16 November 2007

People and organisations
- President: Lech Kaczyński
- Prime Minister: Jarosław Kaczyński
- Prime Minister's history: 2006–2007
- Deputy Prime Minister: Ludwik Dorn (2006-2007); Roman Giertych (2006-2007); Andrzej Lepper (2006-2007, 2007); Przemysław Gosiewski (2007, 2007); Zyta Gilowska (2006-2007, 2007)
- Ministers removed: 12 resigned
- Member parties: Law and Justice Samoobrona (until 2007) League of Polish Families (until 2007)
- Status in legislature: Majority (coalition) (2006–2007); Minority (2007)
- Opposition party: Civic Platform Democratic Left Alliance Polish People's Party; Samoobrona (since 2007); League of Polish Families (since 2007)
- Opposition leader: Donald Tusk

History
- Election: 2005 parliamentary election
- Legislature term: 6th Sejm & 7th Senate
- Predecessor: Marcinkiewicz
- Successor: Tusk I

Cabinet of Jarosław Kaczyński was appointed on 14 July 2006 and passed the vote of confidence in Sejm on 19 July 2006.

== The Cabinet ==
Office	Image	Name	Party	From	To
Prime Minister		Jarosław Kaczyński	Law and Justice	14 July 2006	16 November 2007
Deputy Prime Minister		Ludwik Dorn	Law and Justice	14 July 2006	7 February 2007
Minister of Interior and Administration		Ludwik Dorn	Law and Justice	14 July 2006	7 February 2007
Deputy Prime Minister		Przemysław Gosiewski	Law and Justice	14 July 2006	16 November 2007
Deputy Prime Minister		Roman Giertych	League of Polish Families	14 July 2006	13 August 2007
Minister of National Education		Roman Giertych	League of Polish Families	14 July 2006	13 August 2007
Deputy Prime Minister		Andrzej Lepper	Self-Defence of the Republic of Poland	14 July 2006	22 September 2006
Minister of Agriculture and Rural Development		Andrzej Lepper	Self-Defence of the Republic of Poland	14 July 2006	22 September 2006
Minister of Agriculture and Rural Development		Andrzej Lepper	Self-Defence of the Republic of Poland	16 October 2006	9 July 2007
Minister of Regional Development		Grażyna Gęsicka	Law and Justice	14 July 2006	16 November 2007
Minister of Environment		Jan Szyszko	Law and Justice	14 July 2006	16 November 2007
Minister of Justice		Zbigniew Ziobro	Law and Justice	14 July 2006	16 November 2007
Minister of Culture and National Heritage		Kazimierz Michał Ujazdowski	Law and Justice	14 July 2006	16 November 2007
Minister of Sport and Tourism		Tomasz Lipiec	Independent	14 July 2006	9 July 2007
Minister of Health		Zbigniew Religa	Conservative People's Party	14 July 2006	16 November 2007
Minister of Economy		Piotr Woźniak	Independent	14 July 2006	16 November 2007
Minister of Interior and Administration		Janusz Kaczmarek	Independent	7 February 2007	7 August 2007
Minister of Agriculture and Rural Development		Wojciech Mojzesowicz	Law and Justice	31 July 2007	16 November 2007
Minister of National Education		Ryszard Legutko	Law and Justice	13 August 2007	16 November 2007
Minister of Foreign Affairs		Anna Fotyga	Law and Justice	14 July 2006	16 November 2007
Chairman of the Committee for European Integration		Anna Fotyga	Law and Justice	14 July 2006	16 November 2007
Minister of National Defence		Radosław Sikorski	Law and Justice	14 July 2006	7 February 2007
Ministry of Construction		Antoni Jaszczak	Self-Defence of the Republic of Poland	14 July 2006	3 November 2006
Minister of State Treasury		Wojciech Jasiński	Law and Justice	14 July 2006	16 November 2007
Ministry of Construction		Andrzej Aumiller	Self-Defence of the Republic of Poland	3 November 2006	13 August 2007
Minister of National Defence		Aleksander Szczygło	Law and Justice	7 February 2007	16 November 2007
Minister of Interior and Administration		Władysław Stasiak	Independent	7 August 2007	16 November 2007
Minister of Finance		Stanisław Kluza	Independent	14 July 2006	22 September 2006
Minister of Sport and Tourism		Elżbieta Jakubiak	Law and Justice	23 July 2006	16 November 2007
Minister of Science and Higher Education		Michał Seweryński	Law and Justice	14 July 2006	16 November 2007
Minister of Transportation		Jerzy Polaczek	Law and Justice	14 July 2006	16 November 2007
Ministry of Construction		Mirosław Barszcz	Independent	13 August 2007	16 November 2007
Deputy Prime Minister		Zyta Gilowska	Independent	22 September 2006	16 November 2007
Minister of Finance		Zyta Gilowska	Independent	22 September 2006	16 November 2007
Minister of Marine Economy		Rafał Wiechecki	League of Polish Families	14 July 2006	13 August 2007
Ministry Labour and Social Policy		Anna Kalata	Self-Defence of the Republic of Poland	14 July 2006	13 August 2007
Minister — Coordinator of Special Forces		Zbigniew Wassermann	Law and Justice	14 July 2006	16 November 2007
Minister of Marine Economy		Marek Gróbarczyk	Independent	13 August 2007	16 November 2007
Ministry Labour and Social Policy		Joanna Kluzik-Rostkowska	Law and Justice	13 August 2007	16 November 2007

Vote of confidence in the Cabinet of Jarosław Kaczyński
Ballot →	19 July 2006
Required majority →	223 out of 445
Votes in favour: • PiS (149); • SRP (54); • LPR (28); • National Parliamentary Circle (5); • Independents (4)	240 / 445
Votes against: • PO (129); • SLD (52); • PSL (24)	205 / 445
Absent: • PiS (6); • SLD (3); • PO (2); • PSL (1); • SRP (1); • LPR (1); • Independents (1)	15 / 445
