= Marcinkiewicz cabinet =

2005–06 Polish government cabinet

- 13th Cabinet of Poland
- 2005–2006
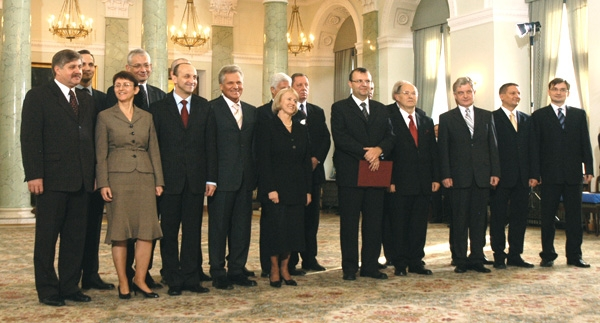
- Rząd Marcinkiewicza (2005)
- Date formed: 31 October 2005
- Date dissolved: 14 July 2006

People and organisations
- President: Aleksander Kwaśniewski; Lech Kaczyński
- Prime Minister: Kazimierz Marcinkiewicz
- Deputy Prime Minister: Ludwik Dorn (2005-2006); Roman Giertych (2006); Andrzej Lepper (2006); Zyta Gilowska (2006)
- No. of ministers: 17
- Member party: Law and Justice; Samoobrona (since 2006, confidence and supply before 2006); League of Polish Families (since 2006, confidence and supply before 2006)
- Status in legislature: Minority (2005–2006); Majority (coalition) (2006)
- Opposition party: Civic Platform; Democratic Left Alliance; Polish People's Party (confidence in 2005)
- Opposition leader: Donald Tusk

History
- Election: 2005 parliamentary election
- Predecessor: Belka II
- Successor: Kaczyński

Cabinet of Kazimierz Marcinkiewicz was appointed on 31 October 2005 and passed the vote of confidence in parliament on 10 November 2005. It was supported by 272 votes with 187 votes against (no abstentions). This minority government was ruled by politicians of Law and Justice and some independents e.g. Zbigniew Religa.

== The Cabinet ==
Office	Image	Name	Party	From	To
Prime Minister		Kazimierz Marcinkiewicz	Law and Justice	31 October 2005	14 July 2006
Chairman of the Committee for European Integration		Kazimierz Marcinkiewicz	Law and Justice	9 May 2006	14 July 2006
Deputy Prime Minister		Ludwik Dorn	Law and Justice	31 October 2005	14 July 2006
Minister of Interior and Administration		Ludwik Dorn	Law and Justice	31 October 2005	14 July 2006
Minister of Regional Development		Grażyna Gęsicka	Law and Justice	31 October 2005	14 July 2006
Minister of Sport and Tourism		Tomasz Lipiec	Independent	31 October 2005	14 July 2006
Minister of National Defence		Radosław Sikorski	Law and Justice	31 October 2005	14 July 2006
Minister of Environment		Jan Szyszko	Law and Justice	31 October 2005	14 July 2006
Minister of Foreign Affairs, Chairman of the Committee for European Integration		Stefan Meller	Independent	31 October 2005	9 May 2006
Minister of Foreign Affairs		Anna Fotyga	Law and Justice	9 May 2006	14 July 2006
Minister of Justice		Zbigniew Ziobro	Law and Justice	31 October 2005	14 July 2006
Minister of Culture and National Heritage		Kazimierz Michał Ujazdowski	Law and Justice	31 October 2005	14 July 2006
Minister of Economy		Piotr Woźniak	Independent	31 October 2005	14 July 2006
Minister Labour and Social Policy		Krzysztof Michałkiewicz	Law and Justice	31 October 2005	5 May 2006
Minister Labour and Social Policy		Anna Kalata	Self-Defence of the Republic of Poland	5 May 2006	14 July 2006
Minister of State Treasury		Andrzej Mikosz	Independent	31 October 2005	3 January 2006
Minister of State Treasury		Wojciech Jasiński	Law and Justice	15 February 2006	14 July 2006
Minister of Finance		Teresa Lubińska	Independent	31 October 2005	7 January 2006
Deputy Prime Minister, Minister of Finance		Zyta Gilowska	Independent	7 January 2006	24 June 2006
Minister of Finance		Paweł Wojciechowski	Independent	24 June 2006	14 July 2006
Minister of Agriculture and Rural Development		Krzysztof Jurgiel	Law and Justice	31 October 2005	5 May 2006
Deputy Prime Minister, Minister of Agriculture and Rural Development		Andrzej Lepper	Self-Defence of the Republic of Poland	5 May 2006	14 July 2006
Minister of Health		Zbigniew Religa	Centre Party	31 October 2005	14 July 2006
Minister of Education and Science		Michał Seweryński	Law and Justice	31 October 2005	5 May 2006
Deputy Prime Minister, Minister of National Education		Roman Giertych	League of Polish Families	5 May 2006	14 July 2006
Minister of Science and Higher Education		Michał Seweryński	Law and Justice	5 May 2006	14 July 2006
Minister of Transportation and Construction		Jerzy Polaczek	Law and Justice	31 October 2005	14 July 2006
Minister of Construction		Antoni Jaszczak	Self-Defence of the Republic of Poland	5 May 2006	14 July 2006
Minister of Transportation		Jerzy Polaczek	Law and Justice	5 May 2006	14 July 2006
Minister of Marine Economy		Rafał Wiechecki	League of Polish Families	5 May 2006	14 July 2006
Minister — Coordinator of Special Forces		Zbigniew Wassermann	Law and Justice	31 October 2005	14 July 2006

Vote of confidence in the Cabinet of Kazimierz Marcinkiewicz
Ballot →	10 November 2005
Required majority →	230 out of 459
Votes in favour: • PiS (154); • SRP (56); • LPR (32); • PSL (25); • Independents (5)	272 / 459
Votes against: • PO (132); • SLD (54); • Independent (1)	187 / 459
Absent: • SLD (1)	1 / 459
