= Ministry of Infrastructure (Poland) =

Government ministry of Poland

- Ministerstwo Infrastruktury
- Ministerial logotype

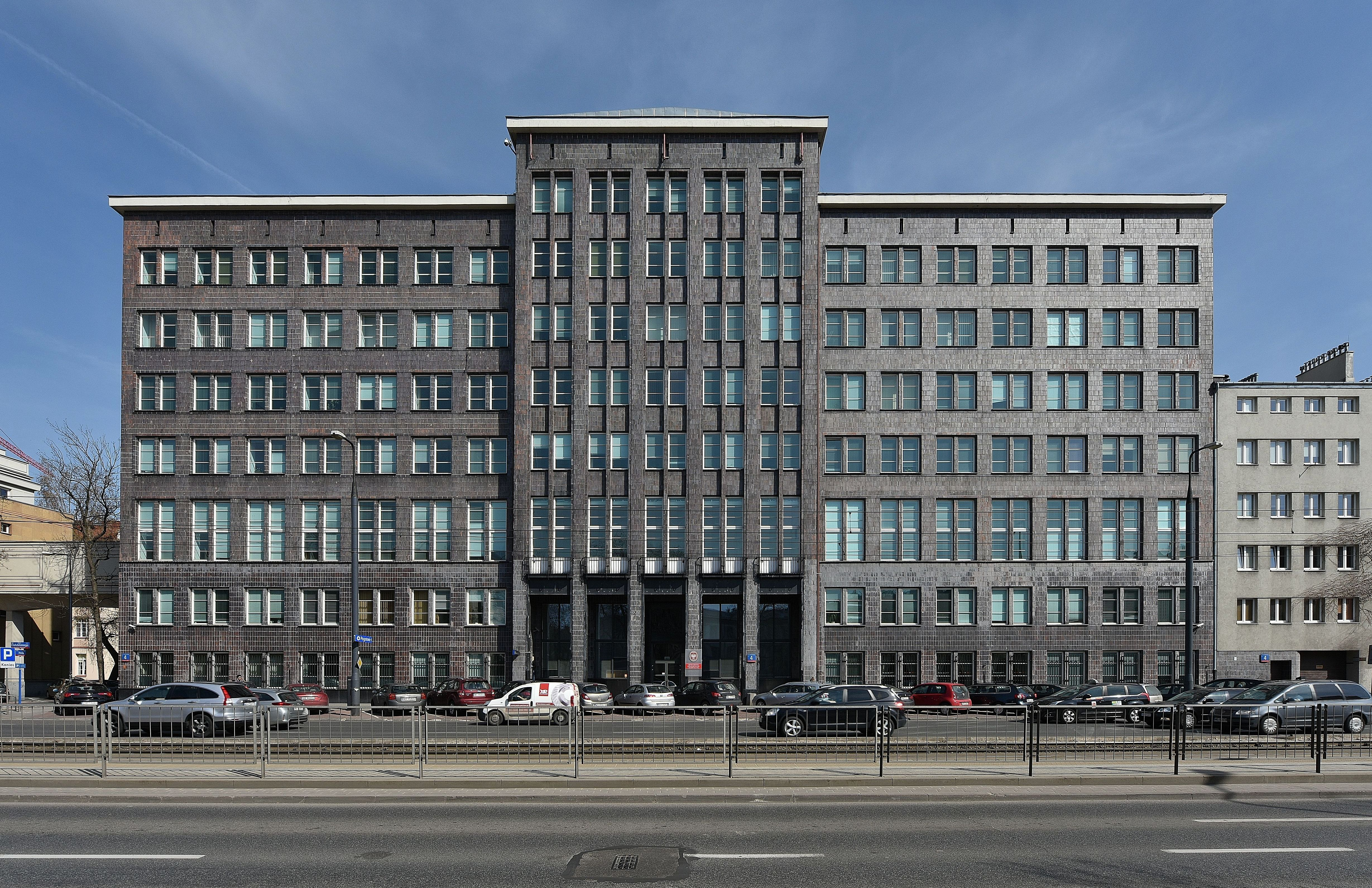
- 4 Chałubińskiego Street, Warsaw

Ministry overview
- Formed: 23 January 2018
- Preceding ministry: Ministry of Infrastructure and Construction
- Headquarters: 4/6 Chałubińskiego Street, Warsaw
- Minister responsible: Dariusz Klimczak, Minister of Infrastructure
- Parent department: Council of Ministers
- Website: www.gov.pl/web/infrastruktura

The Ministry of Infrastructure (Polish: Ministerstwo Infrastruktury) is a ministry within government of Poland currently responsible for transport, inland navigation, water and maritime resources and exploatation. Incumbent Minister of Infrastructure is Dariusz Klimczak since 13 December 2023. Ministry headquarters are located at 4/6 Chałubińskiego Street in Warsaw.

== History ==
- 1919–1924 – Ministry of Railways
- 1924–1926 – Ministry of Railways
- 1926–1939 – Ministry of Communications
- 1944 – Center for Communication, Post and Telegraph
- 1944–1945 – Communication Center
- 1945–1951 – Ministry of Communications
- 1951–1957 – Ministry of Railways
- 1957 – Ministry of Road and Air Transport
- 1957–1958 – Ministry of Communications
- 1957–1987 – Ministry of Communications
- 1987–1989 – Ministry of Transport, Shipping and Communications
- 1989–2001 – Ministry of Transport and Maritime Economy
- The ministry was originally created under the premiership of Leszek Miller in October 2001, yet was abolished in 2005 under the Law and Justice government of Kazimierz Marcinkiewicz, reorganized as the Ministry of Transport and Construction (2005–2006) and later by the Ministry of Transport (2006–2007). Following the 2007 election of Civic Platform under Donald Tusk, the ministry was again reorganized into the Ministry of Infrastructure.
- Following the reelection of Tusk in the 2011 parliamentary elections, the Council of Ministers moved to abolish the Infrastructure Ministry on 21 November 2011. It was replaced by the Ministry of Transport, Construction and Maritime Economy, and the Ministry of Administration and Digitization.
- 2001–2005 – Ministry of Infrastructure
- 2005–2006 – Ministry of Transport and Construction
- 2006–2007 – Ministry of Transport
- 2007–2011 – Ministry of Infrastructure
- 2011–2013 – Ministry of Transport, Construction and Maritime Economy
- 2013–2015 – Ministry of Infrastructure and Development
- 2015–2018 – Ministry of Infrastructure and Construction

== Headquarters ==
The building of the Ministry of Communication is a modernist office building at 4/6 Tytusa Chałubińskiego Street in Warsaw, erected between 1929 and 1931, designed by Rudolf Świerczyński.

In the years 1948–1950 the complex of buildings was significantly expanded according to the design of Bohdan Pniewski. The high-rise part can be considered as the first skyscraper built in Warsaw, and probably in the whole country after World War II.

In the period 1945–2000 the Polish State Railways were also managed from this building.

== List of ministers ==
Portrait	Name (Born-Died)	Party	Term of Office		Prime Minister (Cabinet)
Ministry of Infrastructure					
	Cezary Grabarczyk	Civic Platform	16 November 2007	7 November 2011	Donald Tusk (Tusk I)
	Donald Tusk	Civic Platform	7 November 2011	18 November 2011	Donald Tusk (Tusk I)
Ministry of Transport, Construction and Maritime Economy					
	Sławomir Nowak	Civic Platform	18 November 2011	27 November 2013	Donald Tusk ( Tusk II)
Ministry of Infrastructure and Development					
	Elżbieta Bieńkowska	Civic Platform	27 November 2013	22 September 2014	Donald Tusk ( Tusk II)
	Maria Wasiak	Nonpartisan	22 September 2014	16 November 2015	Ewa Kopacz (Kopacz)
Ministry of Infrastructure and Construction					
	Andrzej Adamczyk	PiS	16 November 2015	9 January 2018	Beata Szydło (Szydło)
Ministry of Infrastructure					
	Andrzej Adamczyk	PiS	9 January 2018	27 November 2023	Mateusz Morawiecki (Morawiecki, Morawiecki II)
	Alvin Gajadhur	Nonpartisan	27 November 2023	13 December 2023	Mateusz Morawiecki (Morawiecki III)
	Dariusz Klimczak	Polish People's Party	13 December 2023	Present	Donald Tusk (Tusk III)
