= Cezary Grabarczyk =

Polish politician (born 1960)

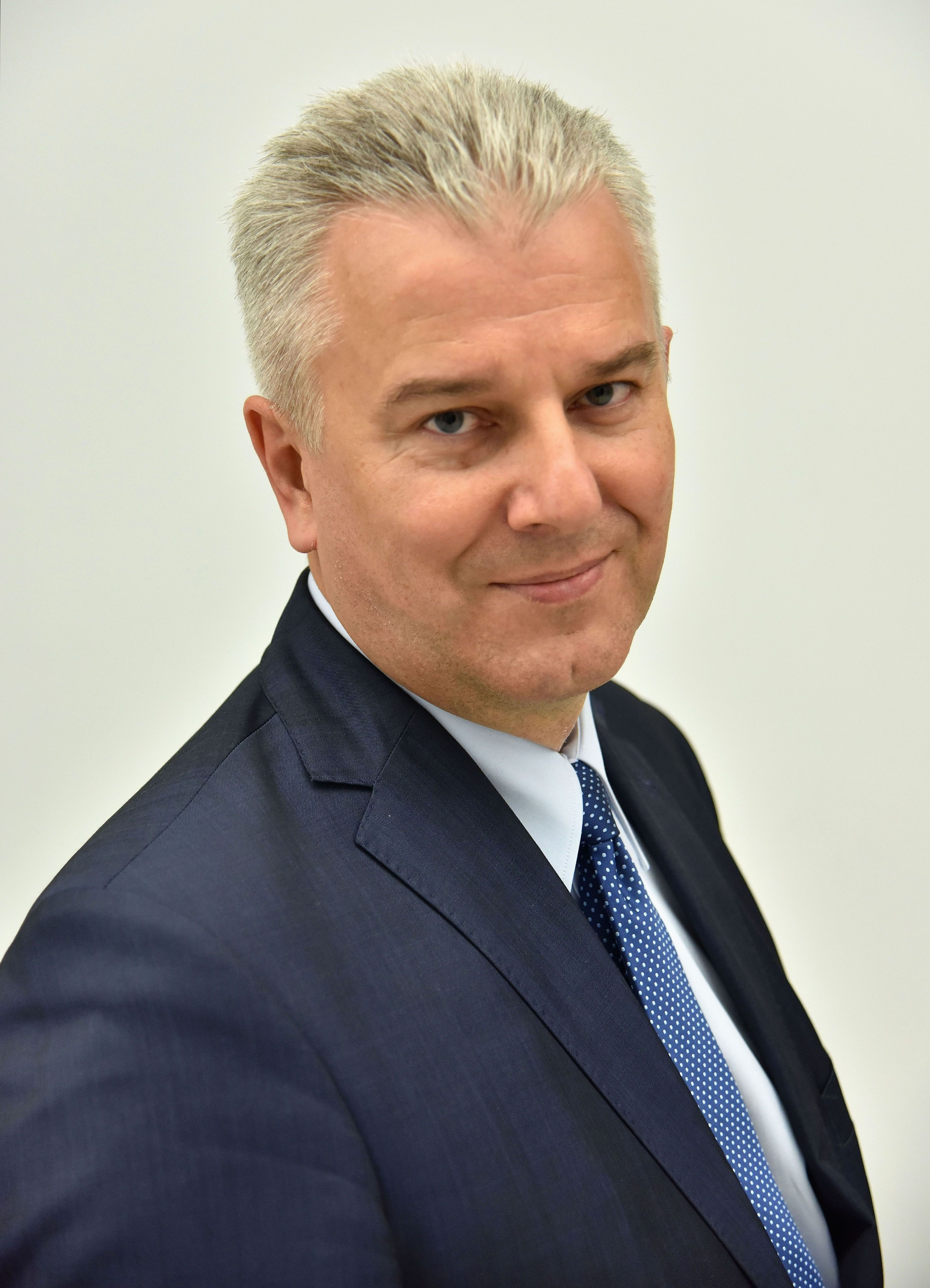
- Grabarczyk in 2016

Minister of Justice
- In office 22 September 2014 – 30 April 2015
- President: Bronisław Komorowski
- Prime Minister: Ewa Kopacz
- Preceded by: Marek Biernacki
- Succeeded by: Borys Budka

Deputy Marshal of the Sejm
- In office 8 November 2011 – 22 September 2014

Minister of Infrastructure
- In office 16 November 2007 – 7 November 2011
- President: Lech Kaczyński; Bronisław Komorowski (Acting); Bogdan Borusewicz (Acting); Grzegorz Schetyna (Acting); Bronisław Komorowski
- Prime Minister: Donald Tusk
- Preceded by: Jerzy Polaczek (As Minister of Transportation)
- Succeeded by: Sławomir Nowak (As Minister of Transport, Construction and Marine Economy)

Member of the Sejm
- In office 19 October 2001 – 12 November 2023
- Constituency: 10 Piotrków Trybunalski (2019–2023); 9 Łódź (2007–2019); 11 Sieradz (2001–2007)

Personal details
- Born: 26 April 1960 (age 65) Łódź, Poland
- Party: Civic Platform

Cezary Stanisław Grabarczyk [t͡sɛˈzarɨ ɡraˈbart͡ʂɨk] (born 26 April 1960) is a Polish politician.

He was elected to the Sejm on 25 September 2005, getting 13,775 votes in the 11th Sieradz district. He stood for election as a candidate on the Civic Platform list. Again elected to the Sejm in the 2007 Polish parliamentary election, in which he received 44,610 votes in the Łódź district.

Following the 2007 parliamentary election, Grabarczyk was Minister of Infrastructure from November 2007 to November 2011, under Prime Minister Donald Tusk. After the 2011 parliamentary election, he was elected to serve as one of the deputy marshals of the Sejm. From 2013 to 2016 he was deputy leader of Civic Platform. From September 2014 to April 2016 he served as Minister of Justice, but got dismissed after controversy aroused around his firearms licence. He regained his parliamentary seat after 2015 parliamentary election. He was reelected to the Sejm in 2019 parliamentary elections.

== See also ==
- Members of Polish Sejm 2005-2007
- Members of Polish Sejm 2007-2011
