= Ministry of Transportation and Construction (Poland) =

Government agency in Poland

- Ministerstwo Transportu i Budownictwa
- Official governmental wall plaque

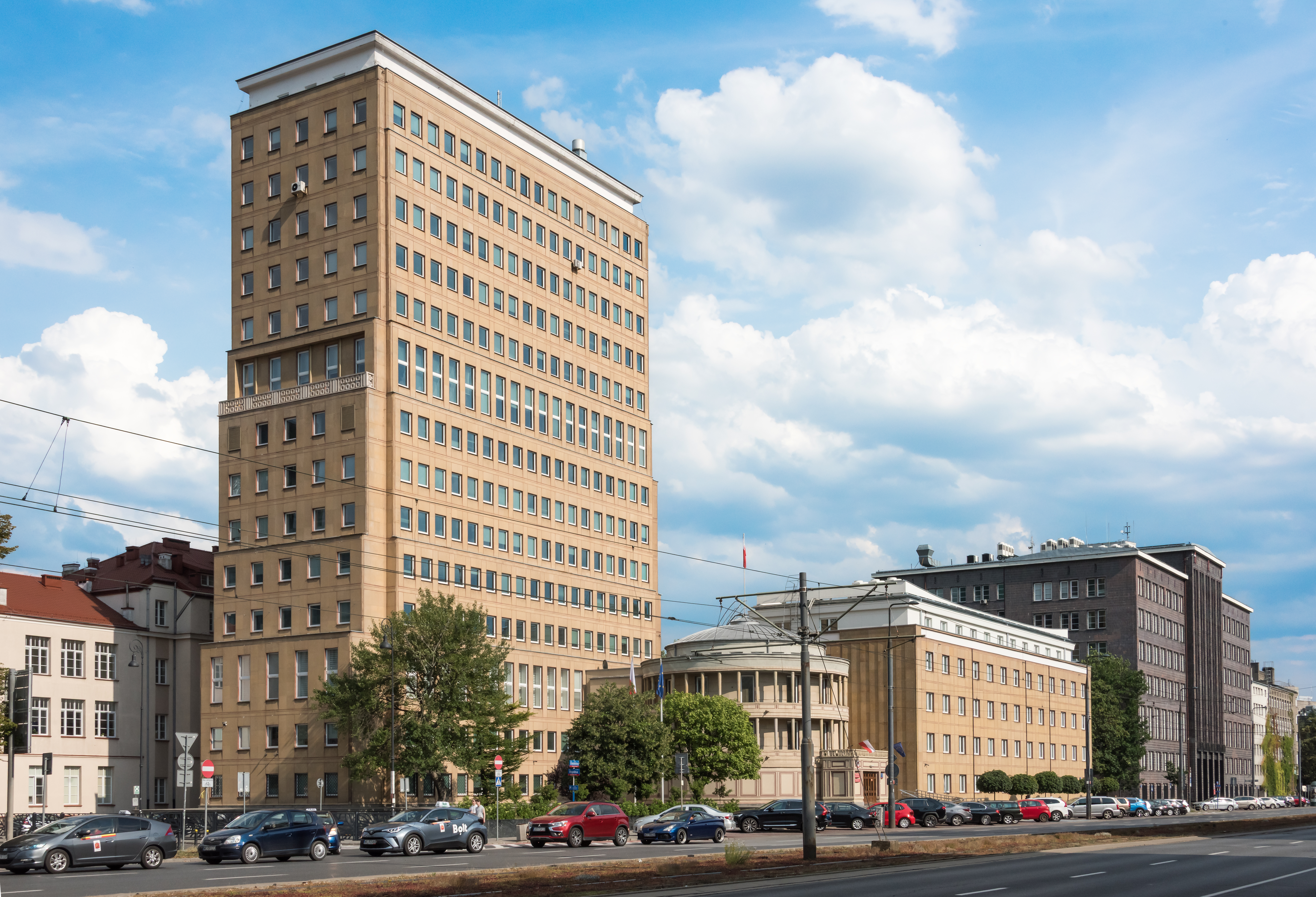

Agency overview
- Formed: 2005
- Preceding agency: Ministry of Infrastructure
- Dissolved: 2006
- Superseding agency: Ministry of Transportation, Ministry of Construction, Ministry of Marine Economy
- Headquarters: 6 Chałubińskiego Street in Warsaw
- Parent agency: Council of Ministers
- Website: www.gov.pl

Ministry of Transportation and Construction (Polish: Ministerstwo Transportu i Budownictwa) was formed on 31 October 2005, from transformation of Ministry of Infrastructure.

It was abolished on 5 May 2006 as a result of signing a coalition agreement between the Law and Justice party, Self-Defense and the LPR. It was replaced by Ministry of Transport, Ministry of Construction and Ministry of Marine Economy.

== Headquarters ==
The building of the Ministry of Communication is a modernist office building at 4/6 Tytusa Chałubińskiego Street in Warsaw, erected between 1929 and 1931, designed by Rudolf Świerczyński.

In the years 1948–1950 the complex of buildings was significantly expanded according to the design of Bohdan Pniewski. The high-rise part can be considered as the first skyscraper built in Warsaw, and probably in the whole country after World War II.

In the period 1945–2000 the Polish State Railways were also managed from this building.

== Ministers of Transportation and Construction ==
Portrait	Name	party	Term of Office		Prime Minister (Cabinet)
	Jerzy Polaczek	Law and Justice	31 October 2005	5 May 2006	Kazimierz Marcinkiewicz (Marcinkiewicz)
