= Antoni Jaszczak =

Polish economist and politician

Minister of Construction of the Republic of Poland
- In office 5 May 2006 – 3 November 2006
- President: Lech Kaczyński
- Prime Minister: Kazimierz Marcinkiewicz, Jarosław Kaczyński
- Preceded by: Jerzy Polaczek (as Minister of Transport and Construction)
- Succeeded by: Andrzej Aumiller

Personal details
- Born: 3 June 1946 Żary, Poland
- Died: 21 July 2008 (aged 62)
- Profession: economist

Antoni Jaszczak (3 June 1946 – 21 July 2008) was a Polish economist and a member of the Sejm, the lower house of the Polish parliament. From 5 May 2006 to 3 November 2006 he served as Minister of Construction of the Republic of Poland in the following cabinets of Prime Ministers Kazimierz Marcinkiewicz and Jarosław Kaczyński.
