= Myśl.pl =

- Type: Quarterly
- Publisher: The Bolesław I the Brave Foundation
- Editor: Ireneusz Fryszkowski
- Founded: 2006
- Political alignment: Right-wing
- Headquarters: Szczecin, Poland
- ISSN: 1896-2084
- Website: mysl.pl

Myśl.pl (Polish for "Idea.pl") is a Polish right-wing journal founded by Ireneusz Fryszkowski in 2006.

== The Crew ==
- Editor: Ireneusz Fryszkowski
- Publicists: Ján Čarnogurský, Sylwester Chruszcz, Łukasz Czuma, Dariusz Grabowski, Bogumił Grott, Lech Haydukiewicz, Tadeusz Isakowicz-Zaleski, Karol Kaźmierczak, Mieczysław Ryba, Aleksander Stralcov-Karwacki, Grzegorz Strauchold, Marian Szołucha, Łukasz Trzeciak, Rafał Wiechecki, Artur Zawisza
- Authors: Jens-Peter Bonde, Wojciech Cejrowski, Wiesław Chrzanowski, Janusz Dobrosz, Stanisław Gawłowski, Dag Hartelius, Tadeusz Iwiński, Marek Kawa, Hans Michael Kofoed-Hansen, Janusz Korwin-Mikke, Ghervazen Longher, Stanisław Michalkiewicz, Andrzej Pilipiuk, Paweł Poncyljusz, Libor Rouček, Radosław Sikorski, Anna Sokołowa, Wojciech Szczurek, Adam Szejnfeld, Jan Szyszko, Thomas Woods, Krzysztof Zaremba.
