= Jerzy Polaczek =

Polish politician (born 1961)

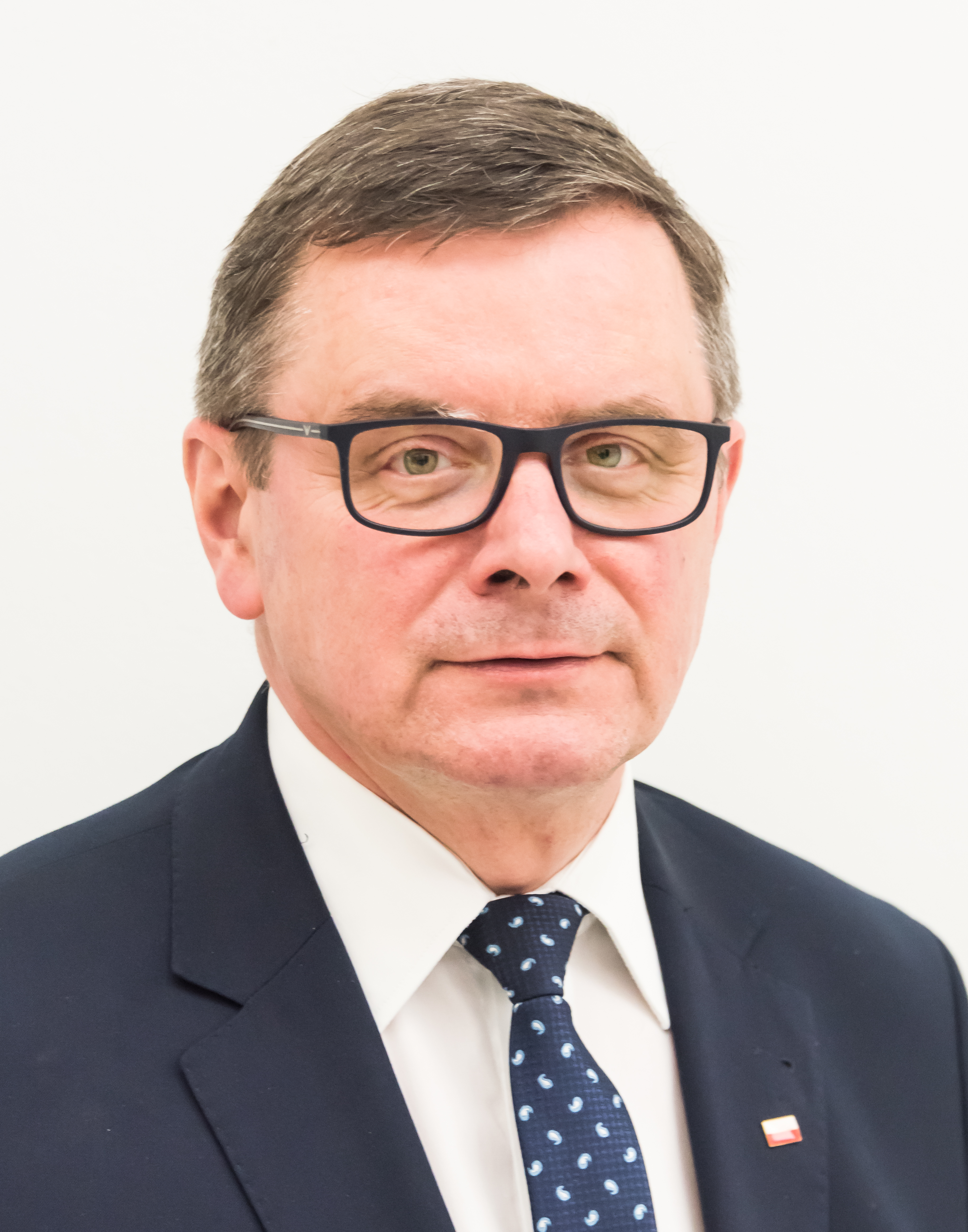

Deputy of the Sejm
- In office 20 October 1997
- Constituency: 31 Katowice (since 2001); 16 Katowice (until 2001)

Leader of Poland Plus
- In office 9 January – 24 September 2010
- Deputy: Marcin Libicki; Jarosław Sellin
- Secretary: Lucjan Karasiewicz
- Preceded by: Position established
- Succeeded by: Position abolished

Minister of Transportation
- In office 12 September – 16 November 2007
- President: Lech Kaczyński
- Prime Minister: Jarosław Kaczyński
- Preceded by: Jarosław Kaczyński (Acting)
- Succeeded by: Position abolished Cezary Grabarczyk (As Minister of Infrastructure)
- In office 5 May 2006 – 7 September 2007
- President: Lech Kaczyński
- Prime Minister: Kazimierz Marcinkiewicz; Jarosław Kaczyński
- Preceded by: Position established Himself (As Minister of Transportation and Construction)
- Succeeded by: Jarosław Kaczyński (Acting)

Minister of Transportation and Construction
- In office 31 October 2005 – 5 May 2006
- President: Aleksander Kwaśniewski; Lech Kaczyński
- Prime Minister: Kazimierz Marcinkiewicz
- Preceded by: Krzysztof Opawski (As Minister of Infrastructure)
- Succeeded by: Position abolished Himself (As Minister of Transportation); Antoni Jaszczak (As Minister of Construction)

Personal details
- Born: 24 August 1961 (age 64) Piekary Śląskie, Polish People's Republic
- Party: Law and Justice
- Other political affiliations: AWS (1997–2001)

Jerzy Jan Polaczek (born 24 August 1961 in Piekary Śląskie) is a Polish politician. He was elected to the Sejm on 25 September 2005 getting 39,335 votes in the 31st Katowice district as a candidate for the Law and Justice list. In 2005-2007 he served as a Minister of Transport.

He was also a member of Sejm 1997-2001 and Sejm 2001-2005, 2005–2007, 2007–2011, 2011–2015, 2015–2019, 2019–2023 and 2023-2027.

== See also ==
- Members of Polish Sejm 2005-2007
