= Ministry of Marine Economy (Poland) =

Government ministry of Poland

Polish Ministry of Marine (or Maritime) Economy (Polish: Ministerstwo Gospodarki Morskiej) was created on 5 May 2006 during the reshuffling of the government of Kazimierz Marcinkiewicz.

The Ministry of Maritime Economy has taken over roles of other departments most notably the Ministries of Agriculture, Economy and Transportation.

Ministry of Marine Economy had an authority over:

- Overseeing of civilian navy
- Security of civilian navy
- Protection of the maritime environment
- Education of maritime crews
- Overseeing government agencies responsible for maritime matters (i.e. maritime schools and courts)
- Fishing

Creation of the ministry was criticized as being politically motivated in Polityka. because some claim that there is no need for the creation of a ministry for such a specific role.

== Abolition of the Ministry ==
In the new government of Donald Tusk, est. on 16 November 2007, there was no Ministry of Marine Economy, which was abolished and its competences transferred to other ministries.

A similar position of Minister of Marine Economy and Waterways (Polish: Ministerstwo Gospodarki Morskiej i Żeglugi Śródlądowej) was again created in the Cabinet of Beata Szydło (est. 16 November 2015) and also assigned to Marek Gróbarczyk.

== List of ministers ==
Portrait	Name	Party	Term of Office		Prime Minister (cabinet)
	Rafał Wiechecki	LPR	5 May 2006	13 August 2007	Kazimierz Marcinkiewicz (Marcinkiewicz) Jarosław Kaczyński (Kaczyński)
	Marek Gróbarczyk	Nonpartisan	13 August 2007	16 November 2007	Jarosław Kaczyński (Kaczyński)

== See also ==
- Ministry of Transport, Construction and Marine Economy (Poland) (2011–2013)
