= Ministry of Agriculture and Rural Development (Poland) =

Government ministry of Poland

- Ministerstwo Rolnictwa i Rozwoju Wsi
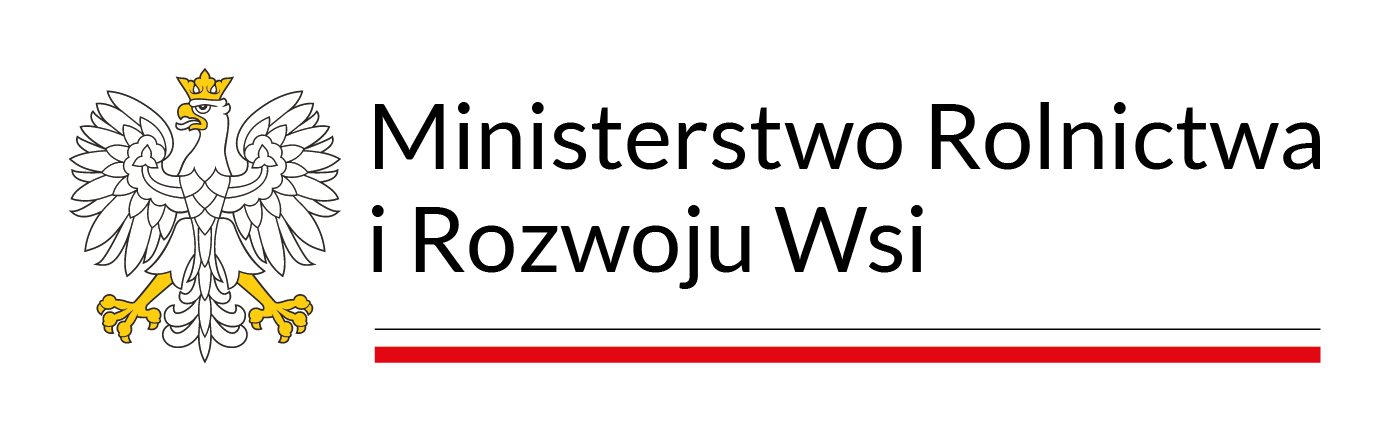

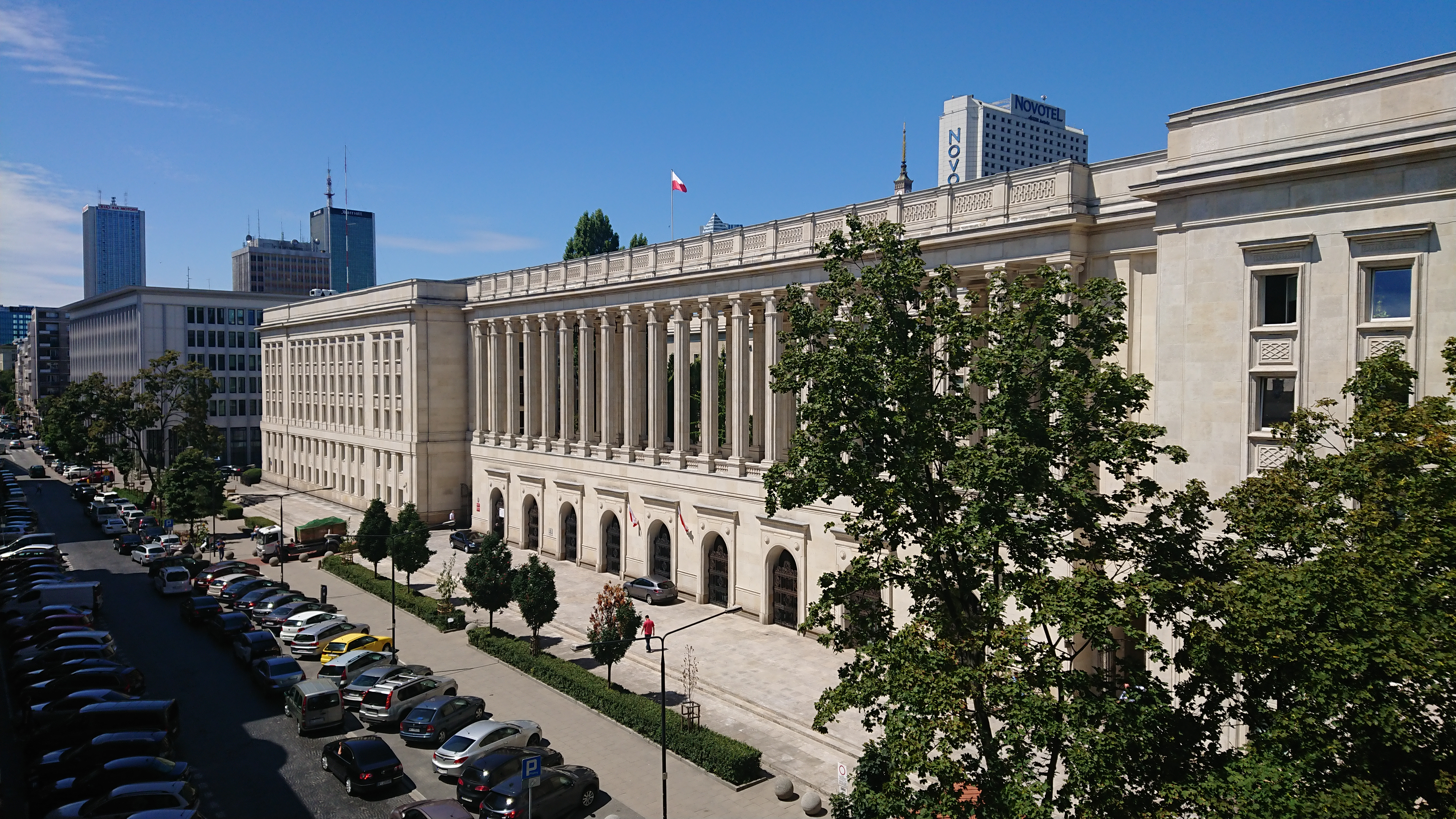
- Seat of the ministry in Warsaw

Agency overview
- Headquarters: ul. Wspólna 30, Warsaw
- Agency executive: Stefan Krajewski, Minister of Agriculture and Rural Development; First Deputy Minister
- Parent agency: Council of Ministers
- Website: www.minrol.gov.pl

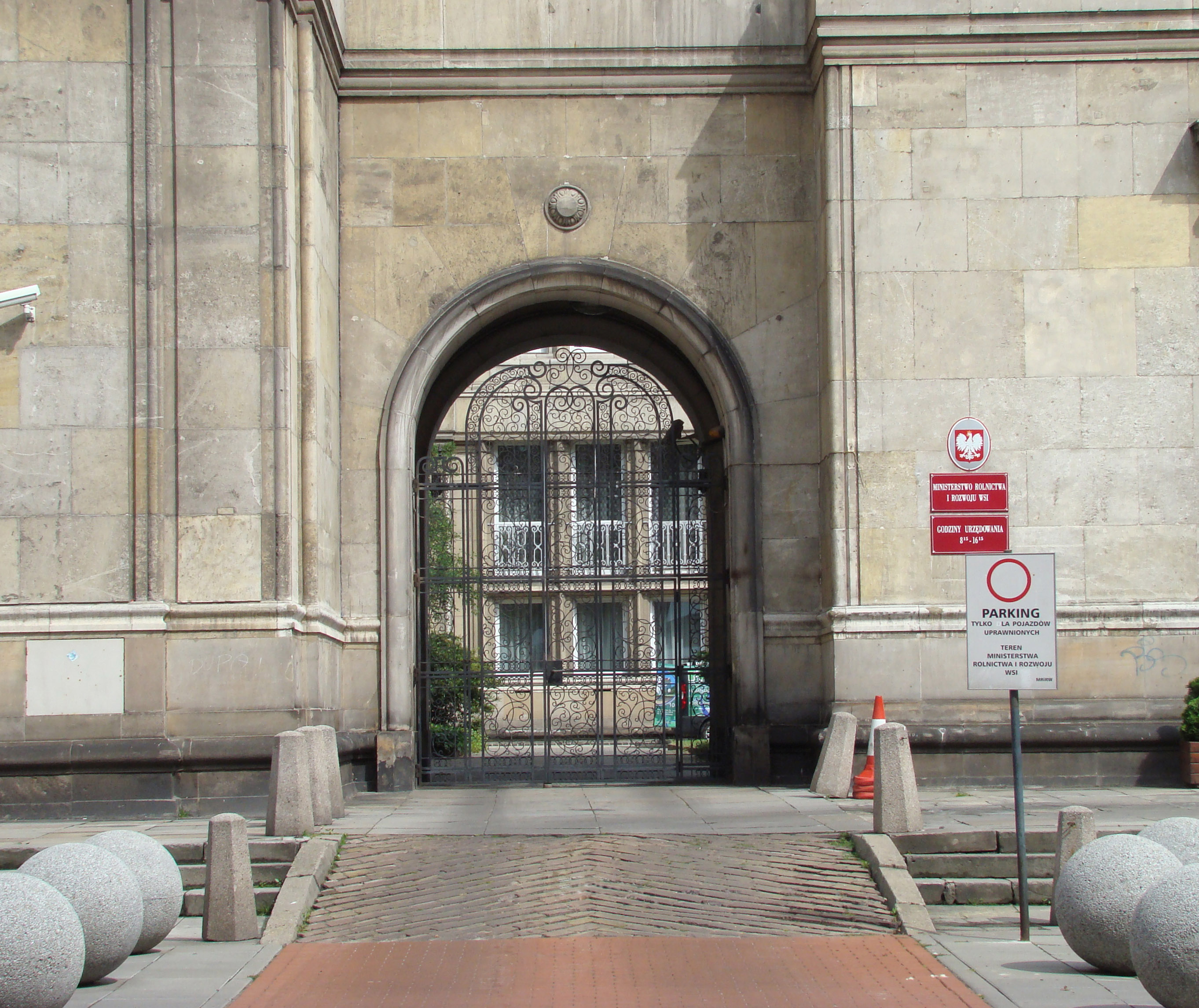
One of the entrances to the Ministry's main building

The Ministry of Agriculture and Rural Development of the Republic of Poland (Polish: Ministerstwo Rolnictwa i Rozwoju Wsi) was formed in October 1999 from the Ministry of Agriculture and Food Economy of Poland; the ministry can trace its history to 1944.

The Ministry's 1999 incarnation was brought about because development of rural regions was Poland's greatest political, economic, and social challenge that was uncontested by both coalition and opposition politicians.

The ministry is concerned with various aspects of Polish agriculture and improving rural areas.

Since 2025, the minister has been Stefan Krajewski.

== List of ministers ==
=== Ministers of Agriculture and Food Economy (1989–1999) ===
Portrait	Name	Party	Term of Office		Prime Minister (Cabinet)
	Czesław Janicki	United People's Party/Polish People's Party	12 September 1989	6 July 1990	Tadeusz Mazowiecki (Mazowiecki)
	Janusz Byliński	Polish People's Party - People's Agreement	14 September 1990	12 January 1991	Tadeusz Mazowiecki (Mazowiecki)
	Adam Tański	Nonpartisan	12 January 1991	23 December 1991	Jan Krzysztof Bielecki (Bielecki)
	Gabriel Janowski	Polish People's Party - People's Agreement	23 December 1991	8 April 1993	Jan Olszewski (Olszewski) Hanna Suchocka (Suchocka) Waldemar Pawlak (Pawlak I)
	Janusz Byliński (acting)	Conservative People's Party	8 April 1993	12 July 1993	Hanna Suchocka (Suchocka)
	Jacek Janiszewski (acting)	People's Christian Party	12 July 1993	18 October 1993	Hanna Suchocka (Suchocka)
	Andrzej Śmietanko	Polish People's Party	26 October 1993	6 March 1995	Waldemar Pawlak (Pawlak II)
	Roman Jagieliński	Polish People's Party	7 March 1995	10 April 1997	Józef Oleksy (Oleksy) Włodzimierz Cimoszewicz (Cimoszewicz)
	Jarosław Kalinowski	Polish People's Party	25 April 1997	31 October 1997	Włodzimierz Cimoszewicz (Cimoszewicz)
	Jacek Janiszewski	Conservative People's Party	31 October 1997	26 March 1999	Jerzy Buzek (Buzek)
	Artur Balazs	Conservative People's Party	26 March 1999	19 October 1999	Jerzy Buzek (Buzek)
Ministers of Agriculture and Rural Development (1999–present)
	Artur Balazs	Conservative People's Party	19 October 1999	19 October 2001	Jerzy Buzek (Buzek)
	Jarosław Kalinowski	Polish People's Party	19 October 2001	3 March 2003	Leszek Miller (Miller)
	Adam Tański	Nonpartisan	3 March 2003	2 July 2003	Leszek Miller (Miller)
	Wojciech Olejniczak	Democratic Left Alliance	2 July 2003	31 May 2005	Leszek Miller (Miller) Marek Belka (Belka I) (Belka II)
	Józef Jerzy Pilarczyk	Democratic Left Alliance	31 May 2005	31 October 2005	Marek Belka (Belka II)
	Krzysztof Jurgiel	Law and Justice	31 October 2005	5 May 2006	Kazimierz Marcinkiewicz (Marcinkiewicz)
	Andrzej Lepper	Self-Defense of the Republic of Poland	5 May 2006	22 September 2006	Kazimierz Marcinkiewicz (Marcinkiewicz) Jarosław Kaczyński (Kaczyński)
	Jarosław Kaczyński (acting)	Law and Justice	22 September 2006	16 October 2006	Jarosław Kaczyński (Kaczyński)
	Andrzej Lepper	Self-Defense of the Republic of Poland	16 October 2006	9 July 2007	Jarosław Kaczyński (Kaczyński)
	Jarosław Kaczyński (acting)	Law and Justice	9 July 2007	31 July 2007	Jarosław Kaczyński (Kaczyński)
	Wojciech Mojzesowicz	Law and Justice	31 July 2007	16 November 2007	Jarosław Kaczyński (Kaczyński)
	Marek Sawicki	Polish People's Party	16 November 2007	26 July 2012	Donald Tusk (Tusk I) (Tusk II)
	Donald Tusk (acting)	Civic Platform	26 July 2012	31 July 2012	Donald Tusk (Tusk II)
	Stanisław Kalemba	Polish People's Party	31 July 2012	17 March 2014	Donald Tusk (Tusk II)
	Marek Sawicki	Polish People's Party	17 March 2014	16 November 2015	Donald Tusk (Tusk II) Ewa Kopacz (Kopacz)
	Krzysztof Jurgiel	Law and Justice	16 November 2015	19 June 2018	Beata Szydło (Szydło) Mateusz Morawiecki (Morawiecki I)
	Jan Krzysztof Ardanowski	Law and Justice	20 June 2018	6 October 2020	Mateusz Morawiecki (Morawiecki I) (Morawiecki II)
	Grzegorz Puda	Law and Justice	6 October 2020	26 October 2021	Mateusz Morawiecki (Morawiecki II)
	Henryk Kowalczyk	Law and Justice	26 October 2021	6 April 2023	Mateusz Morawiecki (Morawiecki II)
	Robert Telus	Law and Justice	6 April 2023	27 November 2023	Mateusz Morawiecki (Morawiecki II)
	Anna Gembicka	Law and Justice	27 November 2023	13 December 2023	Mateusz Morawiecki (Morawiecki III)
	Czesław Siekierski	Polish People's Party	13 December 2023	24 July 2025	Donald Tusk (Tusk III)
	Stefan Krajewski	Polish People's Party	24 July 2025	Incumbent	Donald Tusk (Tusk III)
