= Wojciech Jasiński =

Polish politician (born 1948)

Member of the Sejm
- In office 19 October 2001 – 16 December 2015
- Constituency: 16 – Płock

Personal details
- Born: 1 April 1948 (age 78) Gostynin
- Party: Law and Justice

Wojciech Stefan Jasiński (born 1 April 1948 in Gostynin) is a Polish politician and businessman who last served as chairman of the supervisory board of PKN Orlen from 2020 to 2024. He was previously the chief executive officer of PKN Orlen from 2015 to 2018.

== Biography ==
Jasiński graduated from the University of Warsaw in 1972 with a degree from its Faculty of Law and Administration. He worked at the National Bank of Poland and the Supreme Audit Office, and was the chairman of the management board of the Srebrna Company.

In 1998, Jasiński was appointed to the supervisory board of Bank Ochrony Środowiska. In September 2000 he assumed the position of Deputy Minister of Justice, a role he retained until July 2001. Jasiński served as the Minister of State Treasury in the Cabinet of Kazimierz Marcinkiewicz and the Cabinet of Jarosław Kaczyński.

From 2001 to 2015 (4th, 5th, 6th, 7th and 8th term), Jasiński was a member of the Sejm. During his parliamentary tenure, he held several key roles, including Chairman of the Economy Committee, Chairman of the Public Finance Committee, and Chairman of Standing Subcommittee for the Banking System and Monetary Policy.

On 16 December 2015 Jasiński was appointed by the supervisory board of PKN Orlen to the function of the Chief Executive Officer. After leaving that post, he became a senior executive with Energa responsible for development of investments and energy markets. He later rejoined PKN Orlen as the chairman of its supervisory board.

He also served as a member of the supervisory board of PKO Bank Polski from 2016 to 2024.

== See also ==
- Members of Polish Sejm 2005-2007
