= Szydło cabinet =

Government of Poland from 2015 to 2017

Beata Szydło Cabinet
- 18th Cabinet of Poland
- 2015–2017
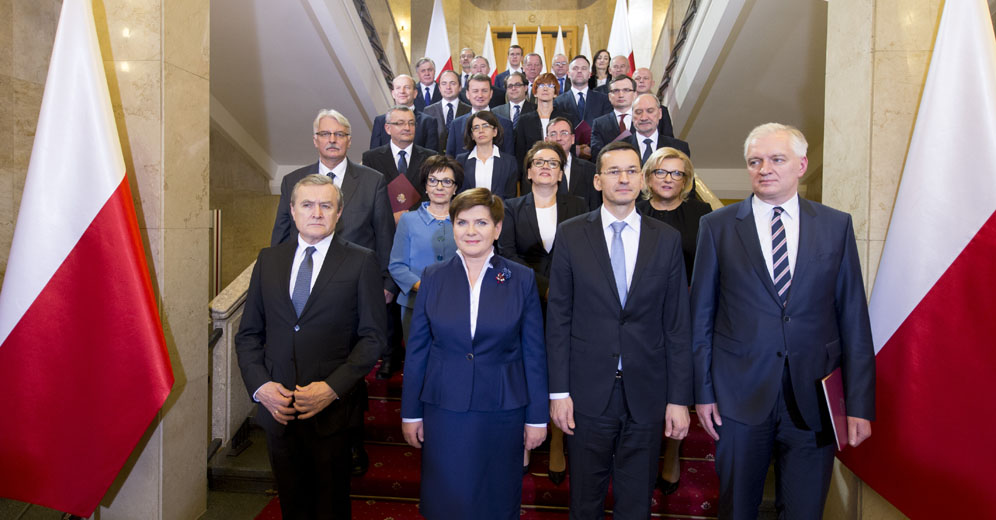
- Ministers pictured after their swearing-in (2015)
- Date formed: 16 November 2015
- Date dissolved: 11 December 2017

People and organisations
- Head of state: Andrzej Duda
- Head of government: Beata Szydło
- Deputy head of government: Mateusz Morawiecki, Piotr Gliński, Jarosław Gowin
- Member parties: Law and Justice Poland Together Solidary Poland
- Status in legislature: Majority
- Opposition party: Civic Platform Kukiz'15 Modern Polish People's Party
- Opposition leader: Ewa Kopacz (till January 2016) / Grzegorz Schetyna

History
- Outgoing formation: Civic Platform
- Election: 2015 Polish parliamentary election
- Predecessor: Kopacz
- Successor: Morawiecki

Cabinet of Beata Szydło formed the 17th government of Poland, until 11 December 2017. Governing during the 8th legislature of the Sejm and the 9th legislature of the Senate, it was led by Beata Szydło.

On 7 April 2017 the government survived a motion of no confidence entered by the opposition, which was rejected with 174 ayes, 238 nays and four abstentions.

== Members of the Council of Ministers ==
Office	Image	Incumbent	Party	In office
Prime Minister		Beata Szydło	Law and Justice	16 November 2015 - 11 December 2017
Minister of Culture and National Heritage; First Deputy Prime Minister		Piotr Gliński	Law and Justice	16 November 2015 - 11 December 2017
Minister of Development; Deputy Prime Minister		Mateusz Morawiecki	Law and Justice	16 November 2015 - 11 December 2017
Minister of Science and Higher Education; Deputy Prime Minister		Jarosław Gowin	Poland Together	16 November 2015 - 11 December 2017
Minister of National Defence		Antoni Macierewicz	Law and Justice	16 November 2015 - 11 December 2017
Minister of Foreign Affairs		Witold Waszczykowski	Law and Justice	16 November 2015 - 11 December 2017
Minister of Interior and Administration		Mariusz Błaszczak	Law and Justice	16 November 2015 - 11 December 2017
Minister of Justice		Zbigniew Ziobro	United Poland	16 November 2015 - 11 December 2017
Minister of Finance		Paweł Szałamacha	Independent	16 November 2015 - 28 September 2016
Minister of Marine Economy		Marek Gróbarczyk	Law and Justice	16 November 2015 - 11 December 2017
Minister of State Treasury		Dawid Jackiewicz	Law and Justice	16 November 2015 - 15 September 2016
Minister of Digitization		Anna Streżyńska	Independent	16 November 2015 - 11 December 2017
Minister of Energy		Krzysztof Tchórzewski	Law and Justice	16 November 2015 - 11 December 2017
Minister of National Education		Anna Zalewska	Law and Justice	16 November 2015 - 11 December 2017
Minister of Infrastructure and Construction		Andrzej Adamczyk	Law and Justice	16 November 2015 - 11 December 2017
Minister of Family, Labour and Social Policy		Elżbieta Rafalska	Law and Justice	16 November 2015 - 11 December 2017
Minister of Environment		Jan Szyszko	Law and Justice	16 November 2015 - 11 December 2017
Minister of Agriculture and Rural Development		Krzysztof Jurgiel	Law and Justice	16 November 2015 - 11 December 2017
Minister — Coordinator of Special Forces		Mariusz Kamiński	Law and Justice	16 November 2015 - 11 December 2017
Minister of Sport and Tourism		Witold Bańka	Law and Justice	16 November 2015 - 11 December 2017
Minister of Health		Konstanty Radziwiłł	Law and Justice	16 November 2015 - 11 December 2017
Minister for Relations with Parliament		Adam Lipiński	Law and Justice	16 November 2015
Minister, Head of the Standing Committee of the Council of Ministers		Henryk Kowalczyk	Law and Justice	16 November 2015 - 11 December 2017
Minister, Head of the Political Cabinet of the Prime Minister		Elżbieta Witek	Law and Justice	16 November 2015 - 11 December 2017
Minister, Chief of the Chancellery of the Prime Minister		Beata Kempa	United Poland	16 November 2015 - 11 December 2017

== Vote of confidence ==
Vote of confidence in the Cabinet of Beata Szydło
Ballot →	18 November 2015
Required majority →	229 out of 456
Votes in favour: • PiS (234); • Independents (2)	236 / 456
Votes against: • PO (135); • Kukiz’15 (39); • Modern (28)	202 / 456
Abstentions: • PSL (15); • Independent (1); • PO (1); • Kukiz’15 (1)	18 / 456
Absent: • PO (2); • PSL (1); • Kukiz’15 (1)	4 / 456
