= Mirosław Kochalski =

Polish mayor

Mayor of Warsaw Acting
- In office 9 February 2006 – 18 July 2006
- Preceded by: Lech Kaczyński
- Succeeded by: Kazimierz Marcinkiewicz (Acting)

Personal details
- Born: 13 October 1965 (age 60) Iława, People's Republic of Poland
- Profession: Historian

Mirosław Kochalski (born 13 October 1965) was the Mayor of Warsaw (interim - after Lech Kaczyński was elected President of Poland).
