= Ministry of Construction (Poland) =

Former government ministry of Poland

Ministry of Construction is an abolished Polish government administration office serving the minister in charge of construction, spatial management and housing.

The Ministry was established by a decree of the Council of Ministers of 5 May 2006. It was abolished on 16 November 2007 and incorporated into the new Ministry of Infrastructure.

== List of ministers ==
Portrait	Name	Party	Term of Office		Cabinet (Prime minister)
	Antoni Jaszczak	Self-Defence of the Republic of Poland	5 May 2006	3 October 2006	Kazimierz Marcinkiewicz (Marcinkiewicz) Jarosław Kaczyński (Kaczyński)
	Andrzej Aumiller	Self-Defence of the Republic of Poland	3 October 2006	13 August 2007	Jarosław Kaczyński (Kaczyński)
	Mirosław Barszcz	Independent	13 August 2007	16 November 2007	Jarosław Kaczyński (Kaczyński)
