= Ministry of Transport (Poland) =

Polish ministry

- Ministerstwo Transportu
- Official governmental wall plaque

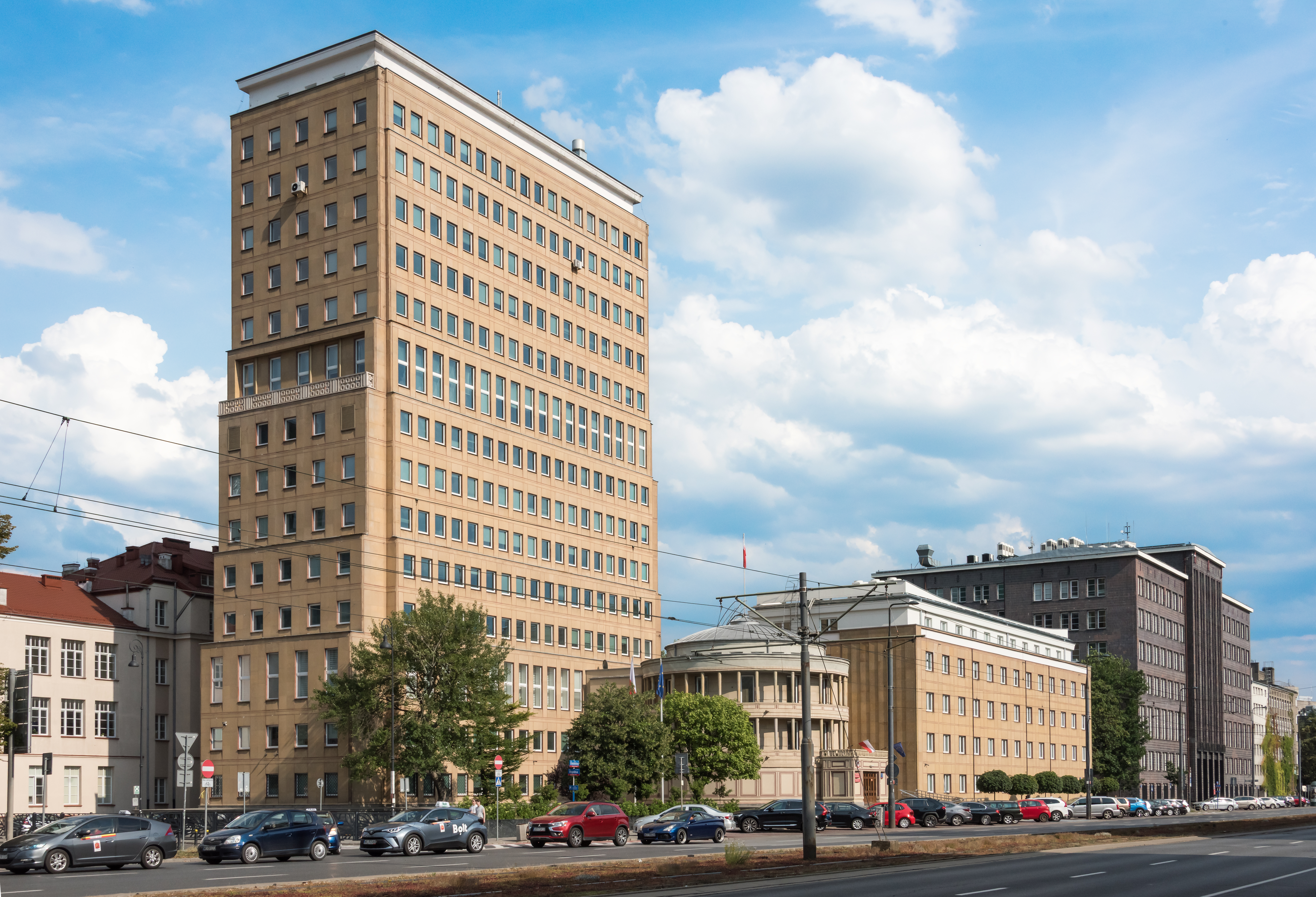

Agency overview
- Formed: 2006
- Preceding agency: Transportation and Construction
- Dissolved: 2007
- Superseding agency: Ministry of Infrastructure
- Headquarters: 6 Chałubińskiego Street in Warsaw
- Parent agency: Council of Ministers
- Website: www.gov.pl

Ministry of Transport (Polish: Ministerstwo Transportu) was formed on 5 May 2006, from transformation of Ministry of Transport and Construction.

The ministry was concerned with various aspects of transport in Poland. In 2007 it was merged into Ministry of Infrastructure.

== Ministers of Transport ==
Portrait	Name	Party	Terrm of office		Prime Minister (Cabinet)
	Jerzy Polaczek	Law and Justice	5 May 2006	7 September 2007	Kazimierz Marcinkiewicz, (Marcinkiewicz) Jarosław Kaczyński (Kaczyński)
	Jarosław Kaczyński (acting)	Law and Justice	7 September 2007	12 September 2007	Jarosław Kaczyński (Kaczyński)
	Jerzy Polaczek	Law and Justice	12 September 2007	16 November 2007	Jarosław Kaczyński (Kaczyński)
