= Marek Gróbarczyk =

Polish politician (born 1968)

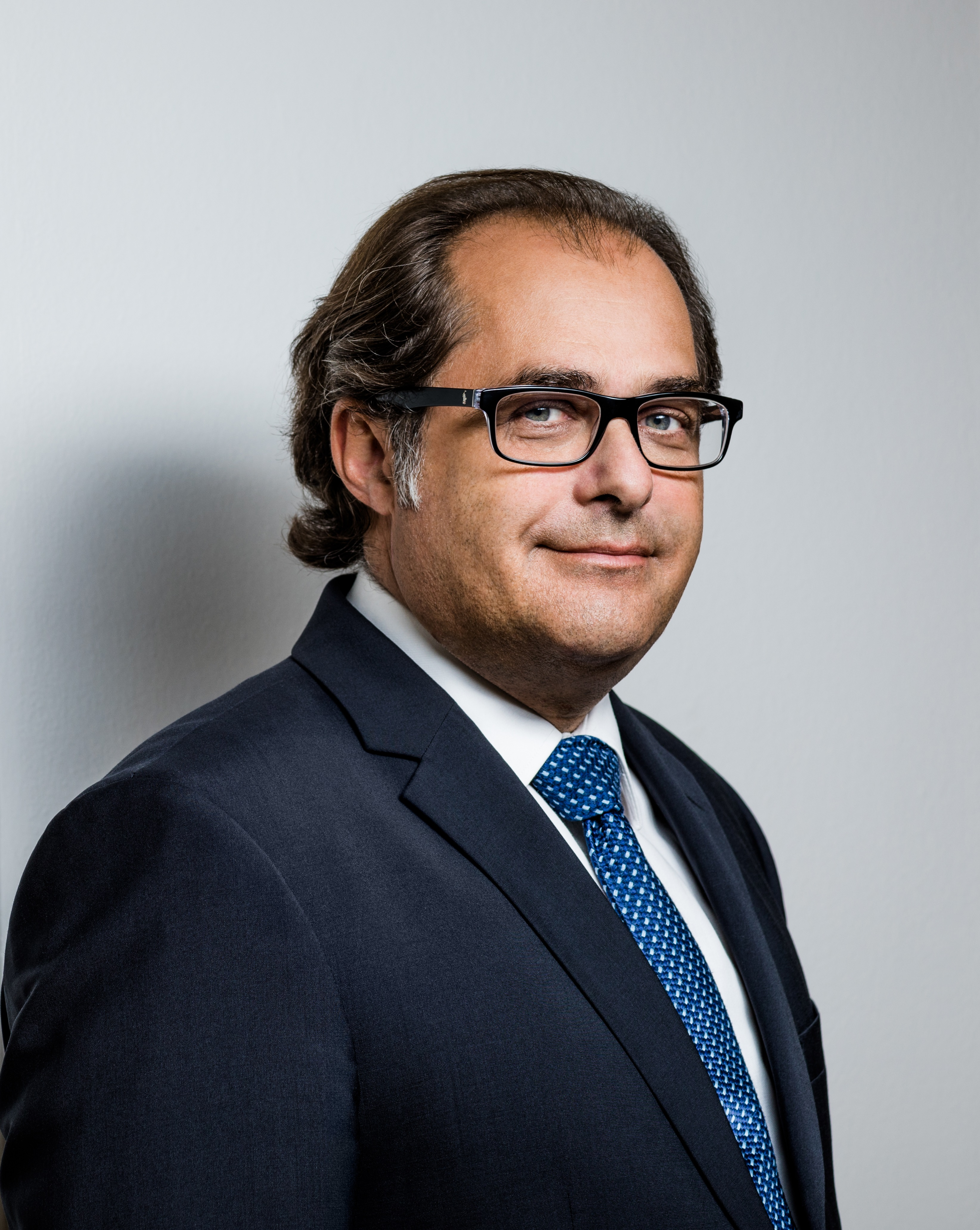
Marek Gróbarczyk

Marek Józef Gróbarczyk (born 13 March 1968 in Nowy Sącz) is a Polish engineer and manager, who served as a Minister of Maritime Economy in Prime Minister Jarosław Kaczyński's government and has served the same role in the Cabinet of Beata Szydło since 2015.

A graduate of the Maritime Academy in Gdynia and the Technological-Agricultural Academy in Bydgoszcz, he spent a number of years after finishing his studies as an officer in western civilian fleets. After this he went into private business (housing) and public service. He was a board member in many state-run oil corporations.

After the resignation of Maritime Economy Minister Rafał Wiechecki on 13 August 2007, Prime Minister Kaczyński named Gróbarczyk as the new minister. During his speech, Kaczyński mistakenly spelled the new minister's name as Ogarczak.

In 2009 he was elected as Member of the European Parliament (MEP) for the Law and Justice party. He was re-elected in 2014, but stood down from the European Parliament in November 2015, when he was replaced by Czesław Hoc.
