= Grzegorz Strauchold =

Polish historian

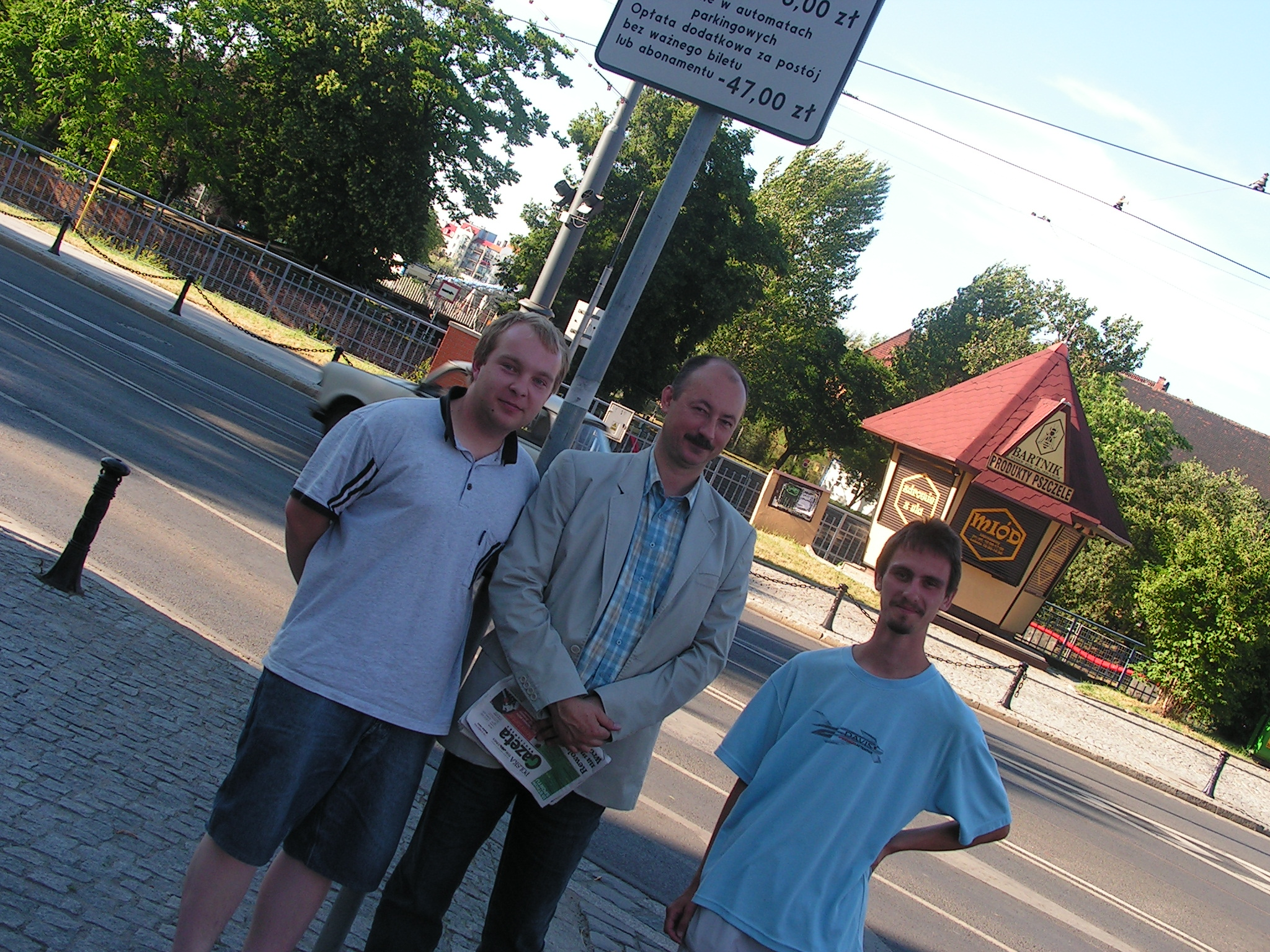
- Born: 1958 (age 67–68)
- Education: University od Wrocław
- Occupation: Historian
- Employer: University of Wrocław

Grzegorz Strauchold (born 1958) is a Polish historian, specializing in the history of the 20th century.

== Biography ==
Strauchold is a graduate and research fellow of the Institute of History, University of Wrocław. He was awarded a doctorate in the humanities in 1993; he researched journalism in west and north Poland between 1944 and 1948, and was supervised by Prof. Wojciech Wrzesiński. He received a postdoctoral degree based on his study of western thought and its implementation in Poland in the years 1945-1957, which dealt with history, historical geography and political thought in west and north Poland. He is the head of the Department of Contemporary History of the Historical Institute of the University of Wrocław. From 2005 to 2008, he was the Deputy Director of another academic Institute.

== Selected publications ==
- Poland native population of the western and northern regions: the views of not only public years 1944-1948, Olsztyn 1995
- Indigenous Peoples, Polish, German, or ... : From nationalism to communism (1945–1949), Toruń 2001
- Western thought and its implementation in People's Poland in the years 1945-1957, Toruń 2003
- Wrocław - Polish capital on an occasional basis: around a post-war celebration of anniversaries of historic, Wrocław 2003
- Dolnoślązacy? : Shaping the identity of the inhabitants of Lower Silesia after World War II, Wrocław 2007. With: Joanna Nowosielska-Sobel.
- Piastowsko-Communist satisfaction?, Wrocław 2008. With: Joanna Nowosielska-Sobel.
