= Roman Giertych =

Polish politician and lawyer (born 1971)

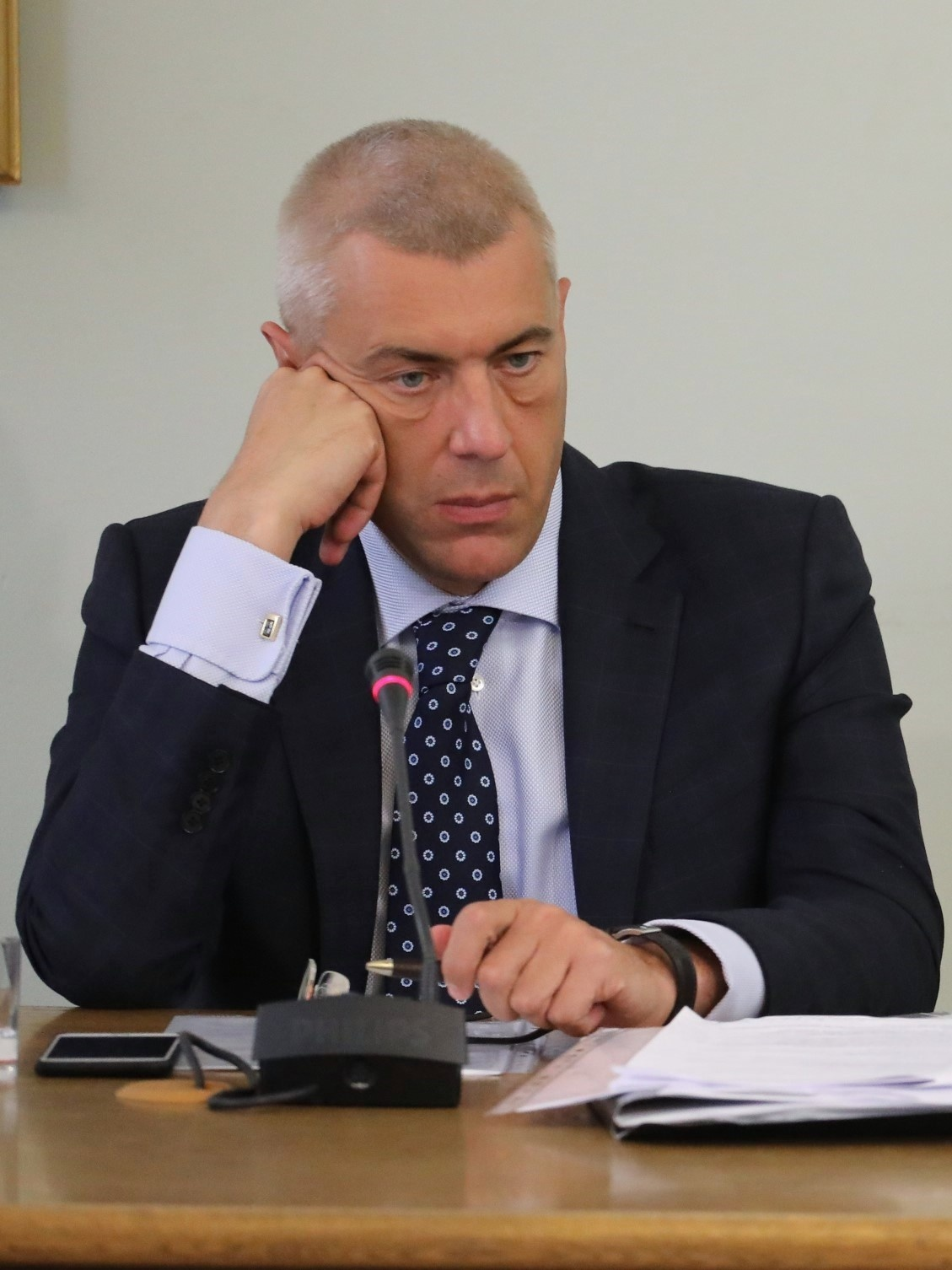
- Giertych in 2017

Deputy Prime Minister of Poland
- In office 5 May 2006 – 13 August 2007
- President: Lech Kaczyński
- Prime Minister: Kazimierz Marcinkiewicz; Jarosław Kaczyński
- Succeeded by: Przemysław Gosiewski

Minister of National Education
- In office 5 May 2006 – 13 August 2007
- President: Lech Kaczyński
- Prime Minister: Kazimierz Marcinkiewicz; Jarosław Kaczyński
- Preceded by: Michał Seweryński
- Succeeded by: Ryszard Legutko

Member of the Sejm, IV and V terms
- In office 19 October 2001 – 4 November 2007
- Incumbent
- Assumed office 13 November 2023

Personal details
- Born: Roman Jacek Giertych; 27 February 1971 (age 55) Śrem, Poland
- Party: Civic Coalition (since 2025); Civic Platform (2025); League of Polish Families (until 2009)
- Spouse: Barbara Giertych
- Children: 4
- Education: Adam Mickiewicz University (M.A. in History, 1994) (LL.M., 1995)
- Occupation: Politician, lawyer

Roman Jacek Giertych (Polish pronunciation: [ˈrɔman ˈɡʲɛrtɨx]; born 27 February 1971) is a Polish political figure and attorney, who served as Deputy Prime Minister of Poland and Minister of National Education from 2006 to 2007.

Giertych began his career as a far-right politician, serving in a Law and Justice-led government as Deputy Prime Minister of Poland and Minister of National Education from May 2006 to August 2007. He was a member of the Sejm from 2001 to 2007 and the chairman of the League of Polish Families party as well as the founder of the All-Polish Youth organization. After the downfall of the coalition in 2007, Giertych became a marginal politician, focusing on his law career and operating his law firm in Warsaw, representing clients in various high-profile cases. Giertych returned to prominence after tying himself with the liberal Civic Coalition, for which he served as a lawyer before being elected to the Sejm again on its lists in 2023 and properly joining the coalition's biggest party in 2025. Following the 2025 Polish presidential election, Giertych became a leading figure in the party's election denial against president-elect Karol Nawrocki, attempting to undermine the legitimacy of the election.

== Early life ==
Born in Śrem, Roman Giertych comes from a family of Polish politicians, a son of Maciej Giertych and a grandson of Jędrzej Giertych. His uncle on his father's side is Wojciech Giertych, O.P., Theologian of the Pontifical Household and professor of theology at the Pontifical University of Saint Thomas Aquinas, Angelicum in Rome. Two of his aunts also entered religious life.

He spent his entire early life in Kórnik, where he finished both primary and secondary school. He graduated from Adam Mickiewicz University in Poznań, with Master's degrees in History (1989-1994) and Law (1990-1995). Following this, he completed his advocate apprenticeship in Warsaw in the year 2000. His apprenticeship supervisor was Polish advocate, Zdzisław Krzemiński, an expert in family and civil law and a supporter of Endecja. Giertych also became a member of Opus Dei.

== Political career ==
Giertych and the LPR had a strong national and anti-EU profile. Prior to the 2003 Polish referendum on EU membership, the LPR campaigned against it, denouncing it as a "centralised, socialist superstate". Officially, the LPR declares that it favours a "Europe of nations". Under Giertych's leadership, the LPR was successful in the European Parliament elections in June 2004, temporarily becoming the second-strongest Polish party with 14% of the votes. His father Maciej Giertych was elected MEP. In the 2005 parliamentary elections, LPR gained 8% of the votes.

In July 2004, Giertych was elected a member and vice-chairman of PKN Orlen investigation commission, which is credited, among other things, with destroying the presidential aspirations of Włodzimierz Cimoszewicz.

=== Minister of Education ===
On 5 May 2006, Giertych was appointed minister of education and vice-premier, while the LPR joined a governmental coalition with PiS. His nomination was largely controversial because of his nationalist and authoritarian views. The following day, about 100 people protested in front of the Ministry of Education against this appointment. A couple of weeks later, almost 140 000 people signed a petition to remove him from the post.

In March 2007 Giertych proposed a bill that would ban homosexual people from the teaching profession and would also allow the dismissal from employment of those teachers who promote "the culture of homosexual lifestyle".

=== Later activity ===
The PiS-led coalition collapsed in mid-2007, triggering strife between the former partners. After losses in the elections of late 2007, Giertych stood down as leader of the LPR and left the party in 2009, which had already been deserted by most adherents such as Krzysztof Bosak and Robert Winnicki. Giertych became an active opponent of former coalition partner PiS. He declared numerous times to vote for PO, co-founded several political initiatives and established himself as a busy investigator of embezzlement charges against PiS cadre, while he is perceived critically in parts of the liberal public. Although Giertych changed party allegiance, he largely remains a proponent of right-wing politics, as is seen in his stance on abortion. He announced his intention to run for the Polish Senate in the 2023 Polish election, but he decided against it after the left-wing New Left strongly opposed to him. Instead, he has been offered to be a candidate for the Polish Sejm in 2023, on KO's lists, which he accepted. Since autumn 2023, he is a member of the Sejm following the 2023 Polish parliamentary election from the list of Civic Coalition. In January 2024, he was chosen to be deputy chairman of an investigation committee of the Civic Coalition parliament faction. In 2025, he joined the liberal Civic Platform.

=== Election denialism ===
Giertych attempted to undermine the 2025 Polish presidential election, denying the election results following the loss of his party's candidate, Rafał Trzaskowski. Giertych accused the opposition of rigging the elections and called for Marshal of the Sejm Szymon Hołownia to not inaugurate president-elect Karol Nawrocki, protesting the inauguration afterwards.

== Legal career and legal issues ==
After leaving parliament in 2007, Giertych returned to legal practice. His legal practice was perceived as a way to keep in touch with politics, for he mostly served public figures in cases with high media attention. He represented entrepreneur Ryszard Krauze, accused of dealing with a gang, in a trial in which the claim was allowed in the first instance, consequently ordering Telewizja Polska (Polish Television) and Anita Gargas to apologize to the entrepreneur. Also, he was the attorney of Radosław Sikorski in a suit regarding offensive user comments on the website of Wprost.

Giertych was involved in helping the Jewish community of Góra Kalwaria to reclaim and restore a local synagogue. He was the lawyer of the then head of the European Council, Donald Tusk, in an inquiry into the cooperation of Polish services with the Russian FSB. He also represented the Tusk's family. He was Michał Tusk's attorney in his successful case against yellow press daily Fakt, as well as in a case concerning damage to property. Giertych was also Katarzyna Tusk's attorney in a trial, resulting in an apology of Fakt. He represented Donald Tusk in cases before prosecutors, the Amber Gold Investigation Committee and the VAT Investigation Committee.

Giertych also represented Austrian businessman Gerald Birgfellner in a case against the development company Srebrna ("Silver") and an affiliated dispute with Jarosław Kaczyński, as well as Leszek Czarnecki in two cases. The case was terminated in summer 2026, with Giertych shortly afterwards being accused of publicly exploiting evidence for political reasons.

In 2009, Giertych himself won a lawsuit brought against the publisher of the tabloid Fakt for the protection of personal rights. In 2017, he won a case before the Supreme Court concerning the liability of website publishers for user comments.

The deputy prosecutor general Bogdan Święczkowski filed a motion against Giertych to the bar's disciplinary court to punish him for criticism he had expressed towards Zbigniew Ziobro and the prosecutor's office in late 2016. Giertych stated that this procedure had been motivated politically. In 2020, it was dismissed.

As of July 2025, Giertych is under scrutiny by the Warsaw chamber of attorneys. There were indications that he tried to hector himself into the lawsuit against a couple of Polish YouTubers who are accused of managing illegal gambling schemes. Later that month, he lost a high profile case concerning former polish senator Stanisław Gawłowski. His client was sentenced with 5 years for corruption, money laundering and plagiarism.

In mid-2026, Giertych became the lawyer of former Zondacrypto CEO Przemysław Kral, once more drawing criticism for his alleged connection of political dealings and legal procedures.

=== Polnord trial ===
On 15 October 2020, Giertych was detained on accusations of money laundering in 2014. He, together with 12 other suspects, was accused to have trepanned 92 Mio. Złoty via fictitious obligations out of real estate company Polnord, a former key player on the Polish market. The operation was represented to have benefited, among others, then-shareholder Ryszard Krauze, a fellow suspect and legal client of Giertych, who is a former billionaire struggling with bankruptcy since about 2010.

On 20 July 2020, the European Commission mirrored a statement of the Polish National Bar Council indicating that defense lawyers acting in politically sensitive cases were intensively screened by the authorities. Giertych, together with fellow lawyers Jacek Dubois and Mikołaj Pietrzak, filed a complaint against Zbigniew Ziobro and his deputy to the International Criminal Court in The Hague.

In late December 2021, Associated Press revealed that according to Canadian NGO Citizen Lab, the phone Giertych used in 2019 was infected by the Pegasus spy tool. In February 2022, Giertych spoke at a public hearing in the European Parliament about, among other things, the abuse of Pegasus in Poland.

On 29 March 2022, the Court did not consent to the temporary arrest demanded by the prosecutors due to alleged high probability of guilt. On 29 April 2022, the Regional Court in Lublin upheld the decision of a lower instance.

In June 2022, the Parliamentary Assembly of the Council of Europe urged the European Commission to take a firm stance against the repression of political dissidents, as whom it identified Giertych. In July 2022, the European Commission published a report on the state of the rule of law in Poland that agreed with the aforementioned opinion.

Before the fall elections of 2023, Giertych largely stayed in Italy, where he owns a mansion. Critics argued that he was evading subpoena while staying abroad. He campaigned remotely and reappeared in public during the swearing-in ceremony. In January 2025 the Regional Prosecutor's Office in Lublin announced the discontinuation of the investigation concerning Giertych, while 8 out of 12 other suspects still await trial. In late June, Giertych's dismissal became effective. Now, only Krauze and Giertych's private security agent and confidant Sebastian J. were considered the main suspects. The court argued that Giertych just provided legal counsel without being aware of the major financial dealings of the given subjects. Sebastian J. was a key employee of Giertych and for some time the formal head of one of his service firms. J. is accused of heading a couple of shell corporations that enabled the Krauze group to launder siphoned Polnord capital.
