= Andrzej Aumiller =

Polish politician

Andrzej Kordian Aumiller [ˈandʐɛj awˈmilɛr] (born 25 June 1947, Trzcianka) is a Polish politician, Minister of Construction and Member of Parliament representing Self-Defense of the Republic of Poland (Samoobrona, SRP). He is a graduate in gardening from the Agriculture Academy in Poznań (Akademia Rolnicza w Poznaniu, Wydział Ogrodniczy). He has been a member of Sejm, the lower house of the Polish parliament, elected in the Poznań constituency from the Democratic Left Alliance-Labor Union lists from 2001 to 2005.

From July 2004, he was a member and vice-chairman of the PKN Orlen investigation commission; since April 2005, he has been chairman of the commission.
