= Ministry of Transportation and Marine Economy (Poland) =

Polish ministry

Ministry of Transport and Maritime Economy of Poland (Polish: Ministerstwo Transportu i Gospodarki Morskiej) since 2001 has been included in the competence of the Ministry of Infrastructure.

== Ministers of Transport and Marine Economy ==
Portrait	Name	Party	Term of Office		Prime Minister (Cabinet)
	Franciszek Wielądek	Polish United Workers' Party	20 December 1989	6 July 1990	Tadeusz Mazowiecki (Mazowiecki)
	Ewaryst Waligórski	Nonpartisan	6 July 1990	5 June 1992	Jan Krzysztof Bielecki (Bielecki) Jan Olszewski (Olszewski)
	Zbigniew Jaworski	Christian National Union	11 July 1992	26 October 1993	Hanna Suchocka (Suchocka)
	Bogusław Liberadzki	SdRP	26 October 1993	31 October 1997	Waldemar Pawlak (Pawlak II), Józef Oleksy (Oleksy), Włodzimierz Cimoszewicz (Cimoszewicz)
	Eugeniusz Morawski	Freedom Union	31 October 1997	8 December 1998	Jerzy Buzek (Buzek)
	Tadeusz Syryjczyk	Freedom Union	8 December 1998	8 June 2000	Jerzy Buzek (Buzek)
	Jerzy Widzyk	Christian National Union	12 June 2000	19 October 2001	Jerzy Buzek (Buzek)
