= Ministry of Transport, Construction and Marine Economy (Poland) =

Ministry of Transport, Construction and Maritime Economy
- Ministerstwo Transportu, Budownictwa i Gospodarki Morskiej
- Official governmental wall plaque

Agency overview
- Formed: 21 November 2011
- Preceding agency: Ministry of Infrastructure
- Dissolved: 27 November 2013
- Superseding agency: Ministry of Infrastructure and Development
- Headquarters: ul. Tytusa Chałubińskiego 4/6, Warsaw ul. Wspólna 2/4, Warsaw
- Parent agency: Council of Ministers
- Website: www.transport.gov.pl

Ministry of Transport, Construction and Maritime Economy (Polish: Ministerstwo Transportu, Budownictwa i Gospodarki Morskiej) was formed on 21 November 2011, from transformation of Ministry of Infrastructure.

The ministry was concerned with various aspects of transport in Poland, as well as construction and maritime economy.

The department was merged with the Ministry of Regional Development in November 2013 under Prime Minister Donald Tusk, creating the Ministry of Infrastructure and Development.

The ministry supervises:

- Central Office of Construction Supervision (Główny Urząd Nadzoru Budowlanego)
- General Directorate for National Roads and Highways (Generalna Dyrekcja Dróg Krajowych i Autostrad)
- Office of Rail Transport (Urząd Transportu Kolejowego)
- Road Transport Inspectorate (Inspekcja Transportu Drogowego)
- Civil Aviation Authority (Urząd Lotnictwa Cywilnego)

Dissolved in 2013.

== Minister of Transport, Construction and Maritime Economy ==
Portrait	Name (Born-Died)	Party	Term of Office		Prime Minister (Cabinet)
	Sławomir Nowak (1974-)	Civic Platform (2001-)	18 November 2011	27 November 2013	Donald Tusk (Tusk II)

== Headquarters ==
The building of the Ministry of Communication is a modernist office building at 4/6 Tytusa Chałubińskiego Street in Warsaw, erected between 1929 and 1931, designed by Rudolf Świerczyński.

In the years 1948-1950 the complex of buildings was significantly expanded according to the design of Bohdan Pniewski. The high-rise part can be considered as the first skyscraper built in Warsaw, and probably in the whole country after World War II.

In the period 1945-2000 the Polish State Railways were also managed from this building.
