= Ministry of Infrastructure and Development (Poland) =

Former government ministry of Poland

- Ministerstwo Infrastruktury i Rozwoju
- Official governmental wall plaque

Agency overview
- Formed: 27 November 2013
- Preceding agencies: Ministry of Regional Development; Ministry of Transport, Construction and Marine Economy
- Headquarters: Ulica Wspólna 2/4, Warsaw
- Agency executive: Andrzej Adamczyk, Minister of Infrastructure and Development
- Parent agency: Council of Ministers
- Website: www.mr.gov.pl

The Ministry of Infrastructure and Development (Polish: Ministerstwo Infrastruktury i Rozwoju) was a ministerial department of the government of Poland. The ministry was created in November 2013 following the merger of the Ministry of Regional Development and the Ministry of Transport, Construction and Marine Economy during the cabinet of Prime Minister Donald Tusk. The last minister responsible for the department was Andrzej Adamczyk. It was split in late 2015 into Ministry of Energy, Ministry of Infrastructure and Construction and Ministry of Development.

== Functions ==
The Ministry of Infrastructure and Development was tasked as the main coordinator for a variety of economic and infrastructural development roles. This included Poland's national and regional development policy, managing and distributing European Union structural and cohesion funds, eliminating spatial economic disparities, and promoting social and economic cohesion among the public and the private sector. The ministry was also tasked for managing the republic's transportation infrastructure, including motorways and expressways, national roads, the rail network, airports, and the nation's maritime transport sector. Additionally, the ministry also included housing and construction policy within its scope.

== Ministers of Infrastructure and Development ==
Portrait	Name (Born-Died)	Party	Term of Office		Prime Minister (Cabinet)
	Elżbieta Bieńkowska (1964-)	Civic Platform	27 November 2013	22 September 2014	Donald Tusk, (Tusk II)
	Maria Wasiak (1960-)	Nonpartisan	22 September 2014	16 November 2015	Ewa Kopacz (Kopacz)
