= Rafał Wiechecki =

Polish politician

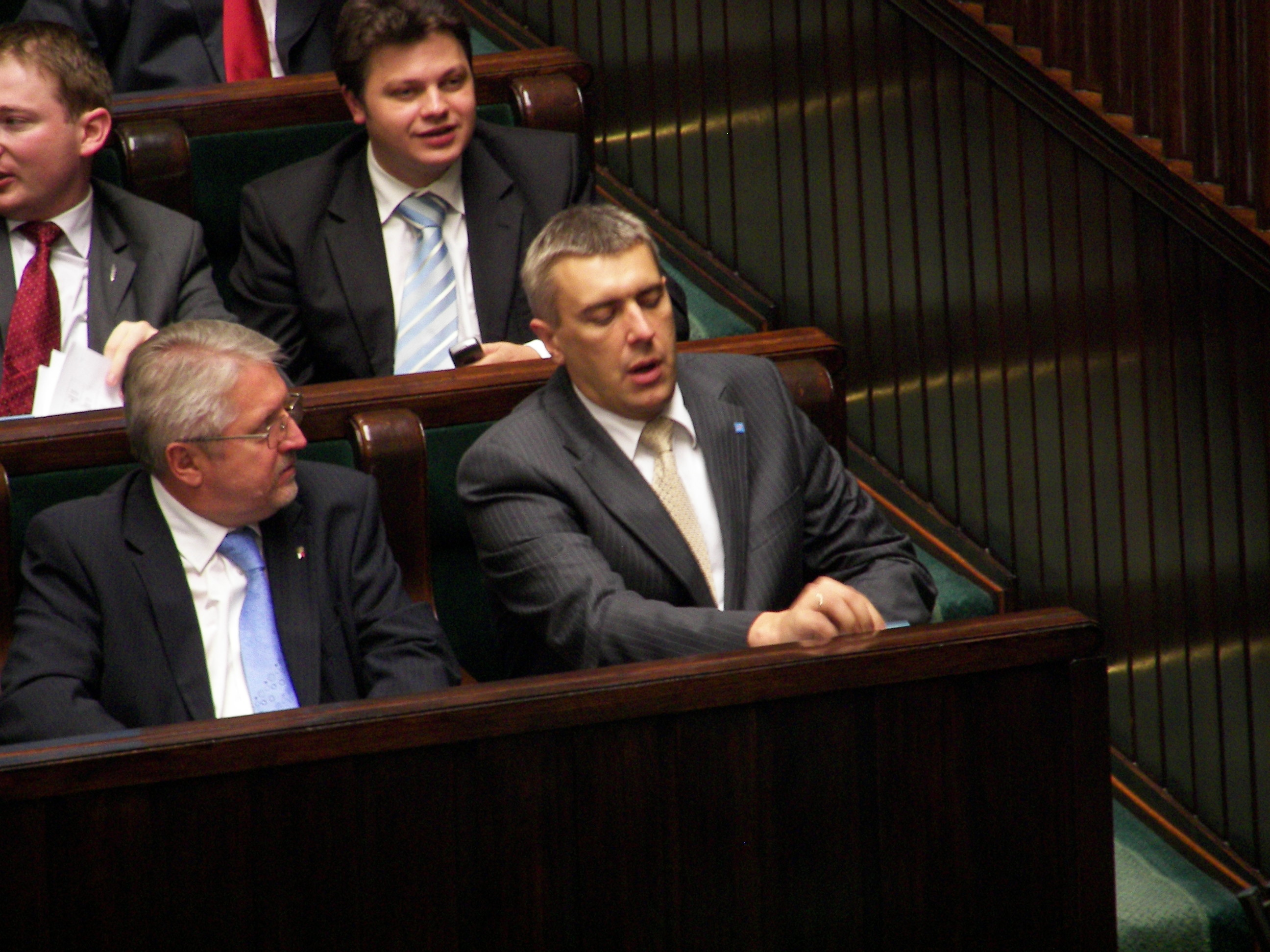

Minister of Maritime Economy
- In office 25 September 2005 – 2007

Personal details
- Born: 25 September 1978 (age 47)
- Party: League of Polish Families

Rafał Sylwester Wiechecki (born 25 September 1978 in Piotrków Trybunalski) is a Polish politician. He was elected to the Sejm on 25 September 2005, getting 6,058 votes in the 41st Szczecin district, running on the League of Polish Families list. He also started cooperation with various other newspapers, including Myśl Polska, Wszechpolak (2002–2004) and Myśl.pl (since 2006).

He was the youngest cabinet minister in Polish history.

== See also ==
- Members of Polish Sejm 2005-2007
