= Kazimierz Marcinkiewicz =

51st Prime Minister of Poland from 2005 to 2006

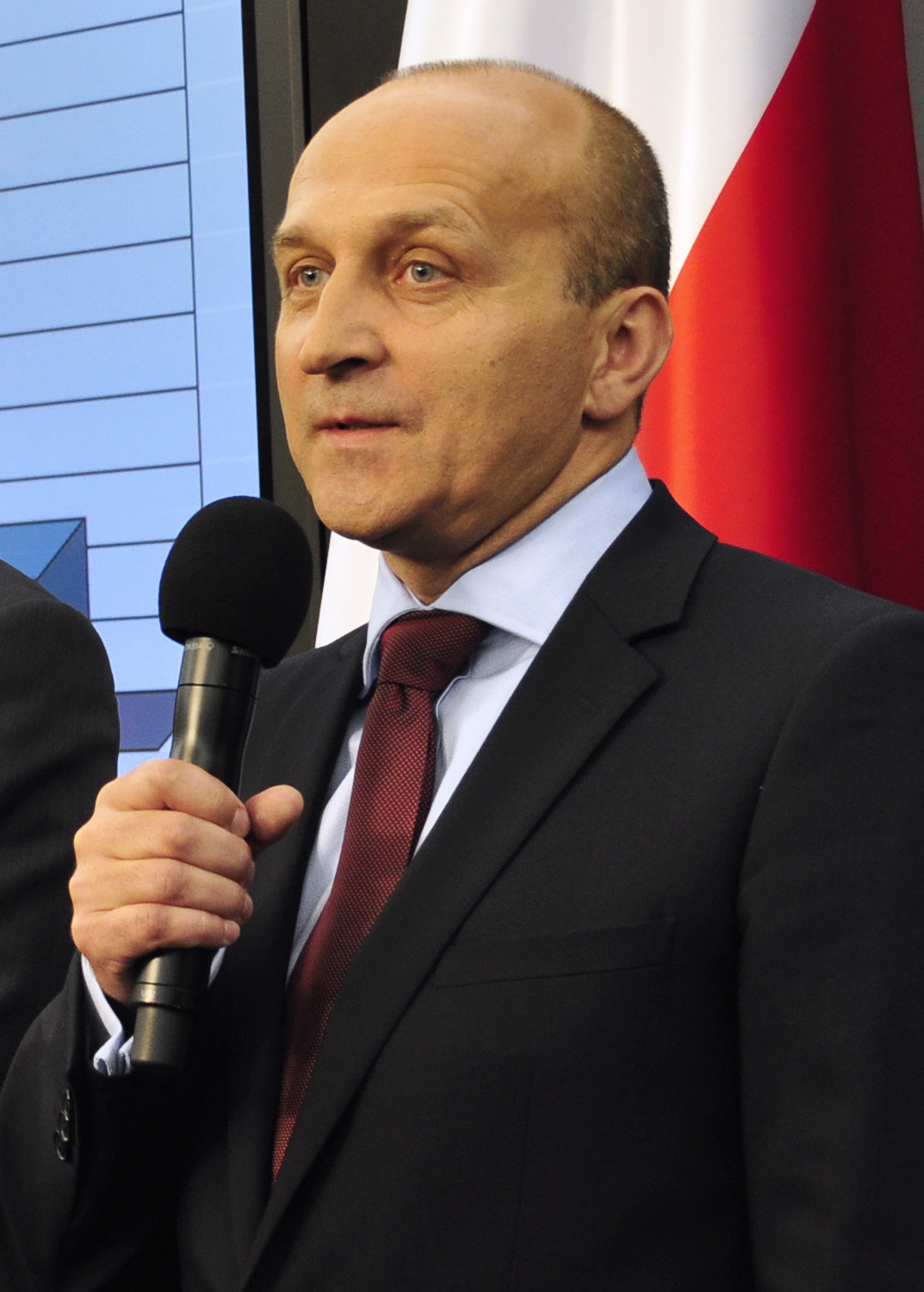
- Marcinkiewicz in 2011

Prime Minister of Poland
- In office 31 October 2005 – 14 July 2006
- President: Aleksander Kwaśniewski; Lech Kaczyński
- Deputy: Ludwik Dorn; Zyta Gilowska; Roman Giertych; Andrzej Lepper
- Preceded by: Marek Belka
- Succeeded by: Jarosław Kaczyński

Mayor of Warsaw
- Acting
- In office 20 July 2006 – 2 December 2006
- Preceded by: Mirosław Kochalski (Acting)
- Succeeded by: Hanna Gronkiewicz-Waltz

Member of the Sejm, III, IV and V
- In office 20 October 1997 – 18 July 2006

Personal details
- Born: 20 December 1959 (age 66) Gorzów Wielkopolski, Poland
- Party: Law and Justice (2001–2007)
- Other political affiliations: European Coalition (2019)
- Spouses: Maria Marcinkiewicz (m. 1981; div. 2009) Izabela Olchowicz (m. 2009; div. 2018)
- Profession: Physicist
- Awards: Legion of Honour

Kazimierz Marcinkiewicz (Note: Polish pronunciation: [kaˈʑimjɛʂ mart͡ɕiŋˈkʲɛvit͡ʂ]) (born 20 December 1959) is a Polish conservative politician who served as Prime Minister of Poland from 31 October 2005 to 14 July 2006. He was a member of the Law and Justice party (Prawo i Sprawiedliwość, PiS).

== Early life ==
Born in Gorzów Wielkopolski, Marcinkiewicz graduated in 1984 from the Faculty of Mathematics, Physics and Chemistry (having studied physics) of the Wrocław University. He also completed post-graduate course in Administration at the Adam Mickiewicz University in Poznań. He worked as an elementary school teacher and a headmaster in his homecity of Gorzów Wielkopolski.

In the 1980s he was also a member of the Solidarity movement and editor of underground press materials. In 1992 he became a State Secretary (formal name for deputy minister) in the Ministry of National Education. From 1999 to 2000 he was the cabinet chief for Prime Minister Jerzy Buzek.

== Prime Minister of Poland ==
Following the victory of the Law and Justice party in the September 2005 Polish parliamentary elections, its prime ministerial candidate, party leader Jarosław Kaczyński decided against becoming prime minister so as not to damage the chances of his twin brother, Lech Kaczyński in the then-upcoming October presidential election. Instead the little-known Marcinkiewicz became PM, leading a coalition formed by Jarosław, who remained in the background, but influential.

Before his prime ministerial appointment, Marcinkiewicz remained a political cipher, which resulted in a political carte blanche after the appointment. Relatively unknown to the public at that time, due to his intensive political activity Marcinkiewicz gained a high public recognition, rapidly becoming the most trusted and popular politician in Poland.

Marcinkiewicz strongly supported Polish membership in EU, although he disagreed with several more integrationist ideas, such as the European Constitution. Economic policy of his cabinet is a continuation of those conducted by previous governments.

Following speculations of a rift with Jarosław Kaczyński, Marcinkiewicz tendered his resignation on 7 July 2006, maintaining however that no one will insert a wedge between him and Kaczyński, words he directed at Donald Tusk. He was succeeded as prime minister by Kaczyński.

== Later life ==
On 18 July Marcinkiewicz was appointed as the temporary acting mayor of Warsaw, a so-called "comissar". During the municipal elections in 2006, he was the Law and Justice candidate for mayor of Warsaw. In the first round of voting, held on 12 November, he got 38.42%, while his closest rival, Hanna Gronkiewicz-Waltz of the opposition Civic Platform won 34.15% of the votes. In the second round, held on 26 November, he got 46.82% of the votes, losing the election.

He was one of the directors of the European Bank for Reconstruction and Development from March 2007 until May 2008.

From 2008 until 2013 he worked for Goldman Sachs, presumably as a lobbyist. Despite his work for Goldman Sachs, major Polish newspapers and news television channels, informed that former Polish prime minister barely spoke English after one year spent in London. He could not answer simple questions asked by Warsaw based English native speakers hired by one of the Polish tabloid who called him to offer a job in other bank in UK.

In 2009, after divorcing his wife and mother of four, he married his former mistress, 22 years his junior, with whom he was embroiled in a bitter divorce battle in September 2015.

== Criticism ==
In the first half of 2009, he came under heavy criticism because of not keeping up with the moral values he promoted while being engaged in politics. In particular, it was discovered that he was criticizing extra-marital affairs and praising traditional family values, while having an affair himself.

== Famous quotes ==
He became famous for his enthusiastic "Yes, yes, yes!" after the success in negotiations of the EU budget on 17 December 2005, – the phrase that has entered into the Polish popular culture as a symbol of a political success 'with a human face' (not refraining from real emotions), but at the same time as a symbol of untempered self-confidence. As a rhetorical device (epizeuxis), it has already been re-used by Volkswagen in its publicity campaign.

== See also ==
- History of Poland (1989–present)
- List of Law and Justice politicians

Political offices
Preceded by Marek Belka	Prime Minister of Poland; 2005–2006	Succeeded by Jarosław Kaczyński
Preceded by Mirosław Kochalski; Acting	Mayor of Warsaw; Acting; 2006	Succeeded by Hanna Gronkiewicz-Waltz
