= Council of Ministers (Poland) =

Central executive body of Poland

- Rada Ministrów
- Central government
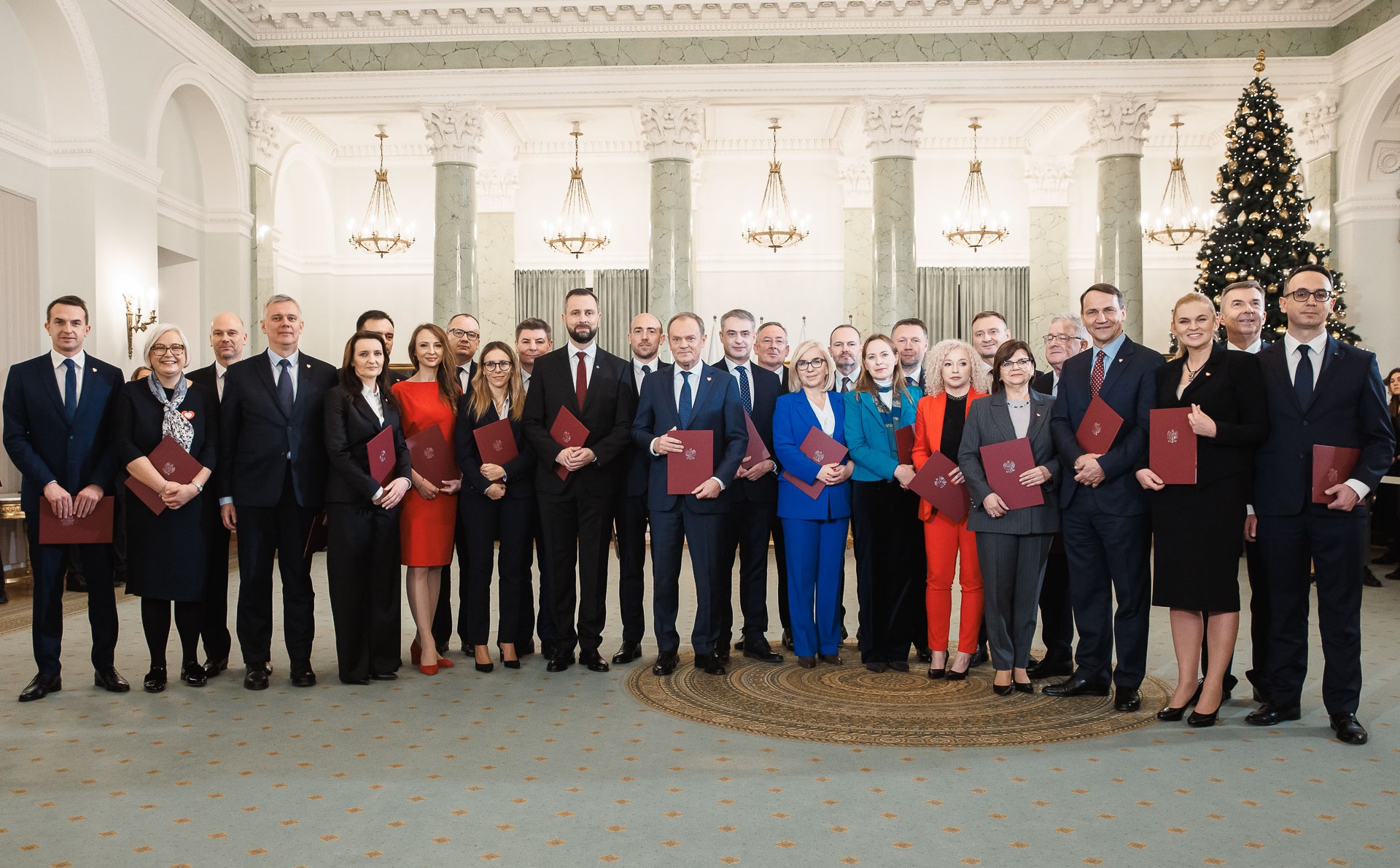
- Third Cabinet of Donald Tusk

Overview
- Country: Poland
- Leader: Prime Minister (Donald Tusk)
- Appointed by: President of Poland (Karol Nawrocki)
- Ministries: 27
- Responsible to: Sejm (motion of confidence)
- Headquarters: Building of the Chancellery of the Prime Minister, Warsaw
- Website: www.gov.pl/web/gov/rada-ministrow

The Council of Ministers (Polish: Rada Ministrów) is the central collective body of the executive government of Poland. The cabinet consists of the prime minister (formally titled President of the Council of Ministers), the deputy prime minister(s), and other ministers. The current competences and procedures of the cabinet are described between Articles 146 to 162 of the constitution.

== Nomination ==
The process of forming the Council of Ministers begins with the nomination of the prime minister by the President of Poland. The prime minister will propose the composition of the cabinet, which must then be approved by the president. Despite the president's nominating role in choosing a prime minister and approving the composition of the cabinet, the presidency's role is strictly limited, as the president must respect the majority wishes of the Sejm. Furthermore, the president is forbidden to select a different cabinet composition than the one already selected by the prime minister. Following their nomination, all members of the cabinet take the oath of office in the Column Room of the Presidential Palace, in a ceremony officiated by the president.

Within fourteen days of its appointment, the cabinet, headed by the prime minister, is obligated to submit an agenda to the Sejm together with a vote of confidence. Should the vote of confidence fail, the process of government formation passes to the Sejm, which will nominate a prime minister within fourteen days, who will again propose the composition of the cabinet. An absolute majority of votes in the presence of at least half of all Sejm deputies is required to approve the cabinet, which the president will accept and administer their oaths of office. Should a vote of confidence fail again, the process of nomination is handed back to the presidency, who must again appoint a prime minister, who will nominate other members of the cabinet. If the vote of confidence fails a third time, the president is obliged to shorten the Sejm's term of office and order new elections. However, since the adoption of the Constitution of 1997, all cabinets have successfully received a vote of confidence for their mandates, and have never required all of the reserve protocols of government formation to take place.

== Powers ==
=== Composition ===
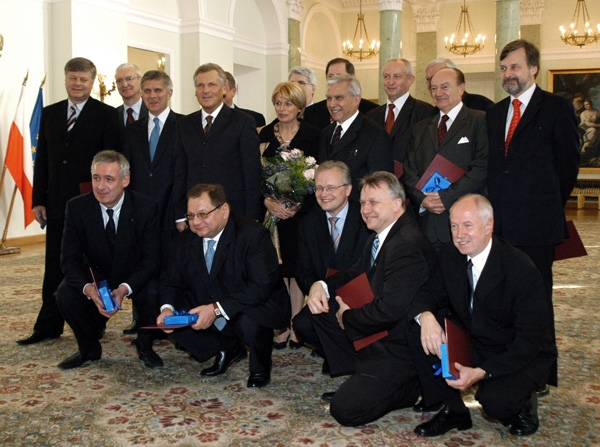
The assembled cabinet of Prime Minister Marek Belka (middle row, second from left) with President Aleksander Kwaśniewski (middle row, third from left) in 2005

The Council of Ministers is headed by the prime minister, known also as the Chairman of the Council of Ministers. The prime minister directs the cabinet's activities and acts as its representative. Furthermore, the prime minister ensures the implementation of the cabinet's policies, coordinates and controls the work of his or her ministers, and issues regulations. The prime minister may also be assisted by a deputy prime minister, who acts as a vice-chairman to the cabinet. Both the prime minister and deputy prime minister can discharge the functions of a minister. The constitution does not further describe the deputy prime minister's functions in the government, though the office's tasks are instead dictated by the Prime minister, and it is not considered an autonomous state organ. The deputy prime minister's position is normally offered to representatives of the government's junior coalition partner. Deputy prime ministers also take on other ministerial positions.

The rest of the cabinet is composed of ministers, whose tasks and governmental administrative portfolios are selected and organized by the prime minister. Cabinet ministers may originate from the Sejm and Senat. Ministers may also be selected from outside of the legislature. Two categories of ministers exist. First are the 'department ministers,' who exercise authority and responsibility within the central government's administration, including ministries, subordinate departments and other institutions. Less important members of the cabinet are the 'ministers without portfolio,' who do not direct any of the government's administrative bodies, yet perform tasks designated to them specifically by the prime minister. Regulations by any member of the council of ministers can be overruled by the cabinet upon a motion by the prime minister. The Premier is also empowered to reshuffle or remove members from the cabinet.

The style of the government and the roles of its ministers are not constitutionally mandated, depending instead on the prime minister's personality.

=== Stature ===
The constitution entrusts the cabinet to craft and implement the most important regulations and policies of the state. As such, the constitution delegates executive power to the cabinet. Although the constitution does not equate the council of ministers as 'the government,' due to the powers of the prime minister, the competences of other ministers, independent bodies, and the direct representatives of the prime minister and the cabinet (voivodes) to the voivodeships who supervise the regional administrations, the cabinet carries out various governmental features. This includes the legislation and implementation of policy conducive of governing the state. Due to its constitutional mandate, the council of ministers acts as the main pillar of political authority, directing state administration, Poland's foreign policy, and much of the republic's domestic policy, unless some competences are reserved (by statute) to other organs or to local authorities.

=== Parliamentary and legal responsibilities ===
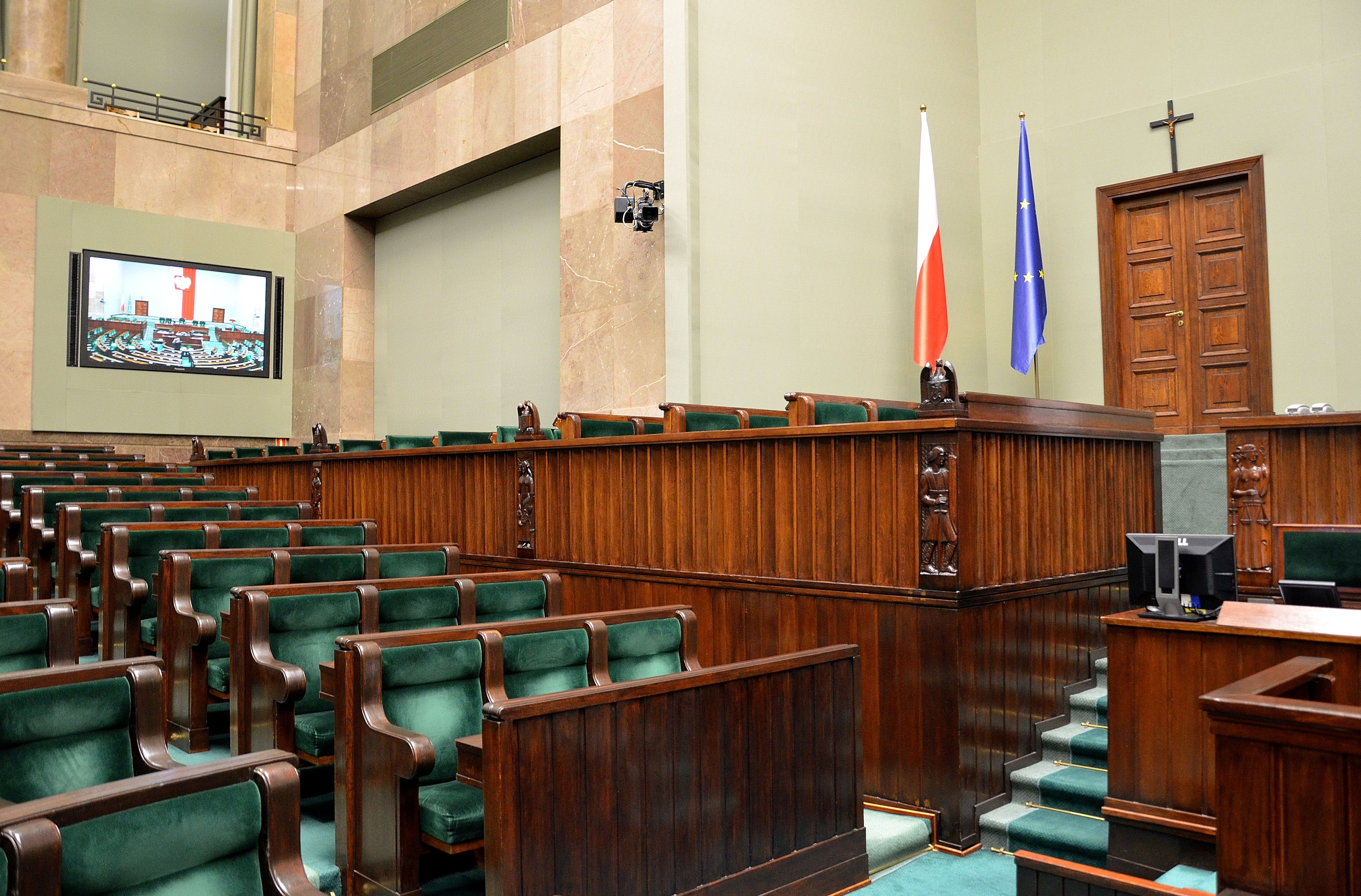
The Polish cabinet sits in the elevated government seating box (center) during sessions of the Sejm.

Due to the republic's parliamentary system, the Council of Ministers are collectively and individually responsible to the Sejm for the operations of the government. The cabinet must respond to questions from Sejm deputies during each sitting session of the chamber. The cabinet must also respond to interpellations within 21 days of their submission. Despite being responsible to the Sejm, the cabinet is not responsible to the Senat, and does not rely on the upper house's confidence to continue its term of office.

During sessions of the Sejm, members of the Council of Ministers, including the prime minister and deputy prime minister, are seated in the government box within the chamber's plenary hall. The seating area faces the central lectern, located on the lectern's right side.

The Sejm can pass a vote of no confidence on an individual minister if the motion receives the support of at least 69 deputies. If the motion is successful, passed by a majority vote, the president will recall the minister from office. Similarly, if the Council of Ministers loses its majority support within the Sejm, the cabinet can be forced to resign in a constructive vote of no confidence. The motion must be approved by at least 46 deputies, and then passed by a majority vote. In such an event, a new prime minister must be simultaneously appointed. The prime minister is also empowered to call a vote of confidence in the cabinet, requiring a majority vote from at least half of all present deputies. In the event of the prime minister's resignation or death, the president can either accept or refuse the cabinet's resignation of office. Following a parliamentary election, the premier must submit the cabinet's resignation in the first sitting of the newly elected Sejm. After its resignation, the cabinet is entrusted to continue administering state functions until the appointment and oaths of office of the new government.

Legally, the Council of Ministers is also held accountable to the State Tribunal for infringements upon the constitution or other legal statutes. Upon a motion by either the president or by 115 deputies, a member of the cabinet can be charged to be brought forth to the State Tribunal, and then require the approval of at least three-fifths of all Sejm deputies to begin the proceedings.

== Meetings ==
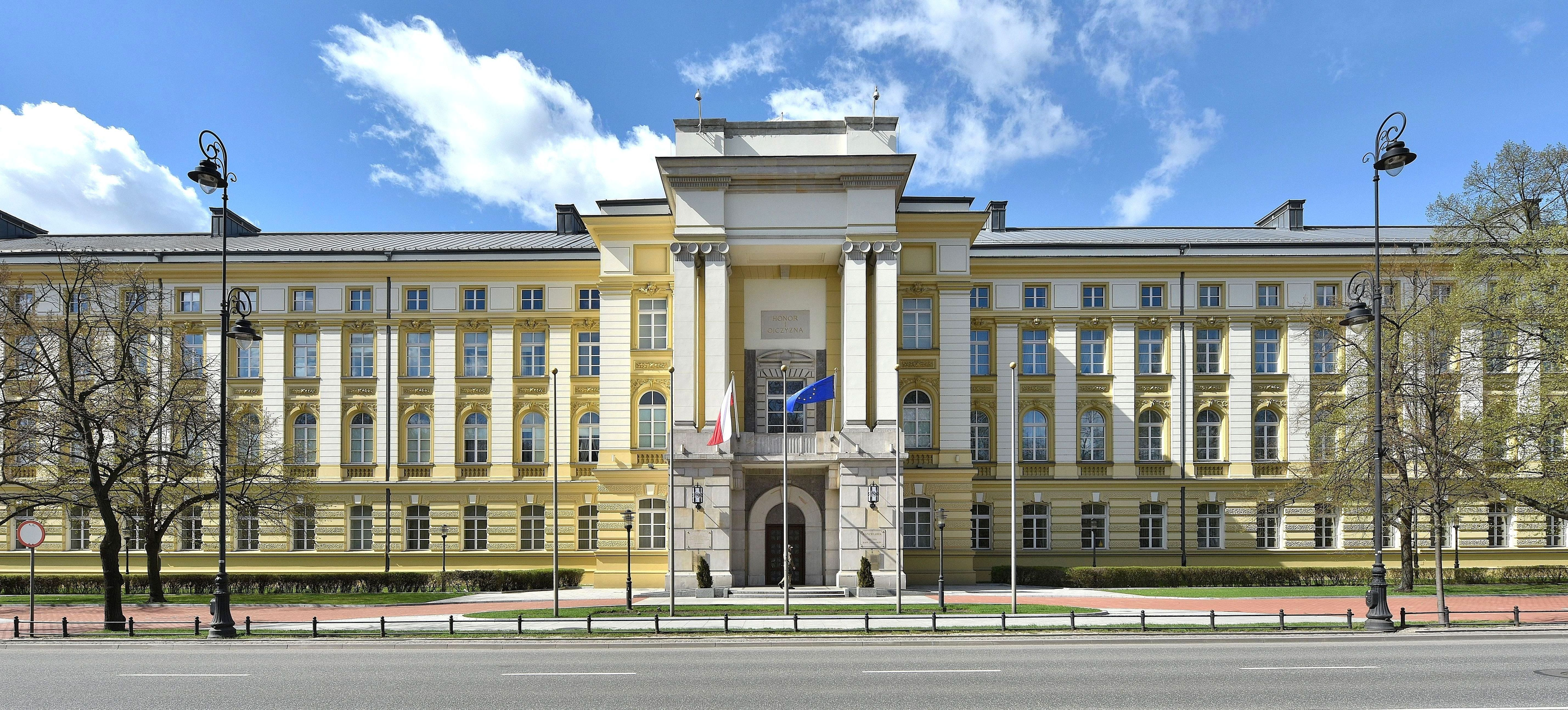
The Building of the Chancellery of the Prime Minister in Warsaw

The Council of Ministers convenes every Tuesday at the Building of the Chancellery of the Prime Minister. The prime minister may also call special cabinet meetings during extraordinary situations.

=== Cabinet Council ===
Additionally, the president is empowered to convene a cabinet council, when the head of state presides over the Council of Ministers. The convening of such a cabinet council is strictly at the president's discretion, who will decide an issue or set of issues important for discussion and deliberation. The president may bring the cabinet's attention to issues of particular importance and ask for information as to the intentions or actions taken by the government. However, meetings of the cabinet council do not possess the same legislative competences as cabinet meetings.

== See also ==
- Chancellery of the Prime Minister of Poland
- Ministries of Poland
- Polish governments and their composition

== Works cited ==
- Brodecki, Zdzisław; Jankowski, Bartlomiej (2003). "The Political System of the Republic of Poland". In Zdzisław Brodecki (ed.). Polish Business Law. The Hague: Kluwer Law International. ISBN 978-90-411-1992-6.
- Garlicki, Lech (2005). "Constitutional Law". In Stanisław Frankowski (ed.). Introduction to Polish Law. The Hague: Kluwer Law International. ISBN 978-90-411-2331-2.
- Jablonksi, Andrzej W. (2000). "The Europeanisation of Government in Poland". In Karl Cordell (ed.). Poland and the European Union. London: Routledge. ISBN 978-0-415-23885-4.
- Jagielski, Jacek (2005). "Administrative Law". In Stanisław Frankowski (ed.). Introduction to Polish Law. The Hague: Kluwer Law International. ISBN 978-90-411-2331-2.
- Prokop, Krzysztof (2011). Białystok Law Books 7, Polish Constitutional Law. Białystok: Wydawnictwo Temida 2. ISBN 978-83-62813-13-1.

== Other resources ==
- Constitution of the Republic of Poland (in English)
