= Second Morawiecki cabinet =

Government of Poland between 2019 and 2023

Second Cabinet of Mateusz Morawiecki
- 20th Cabinet of Poland
- 2019–2023
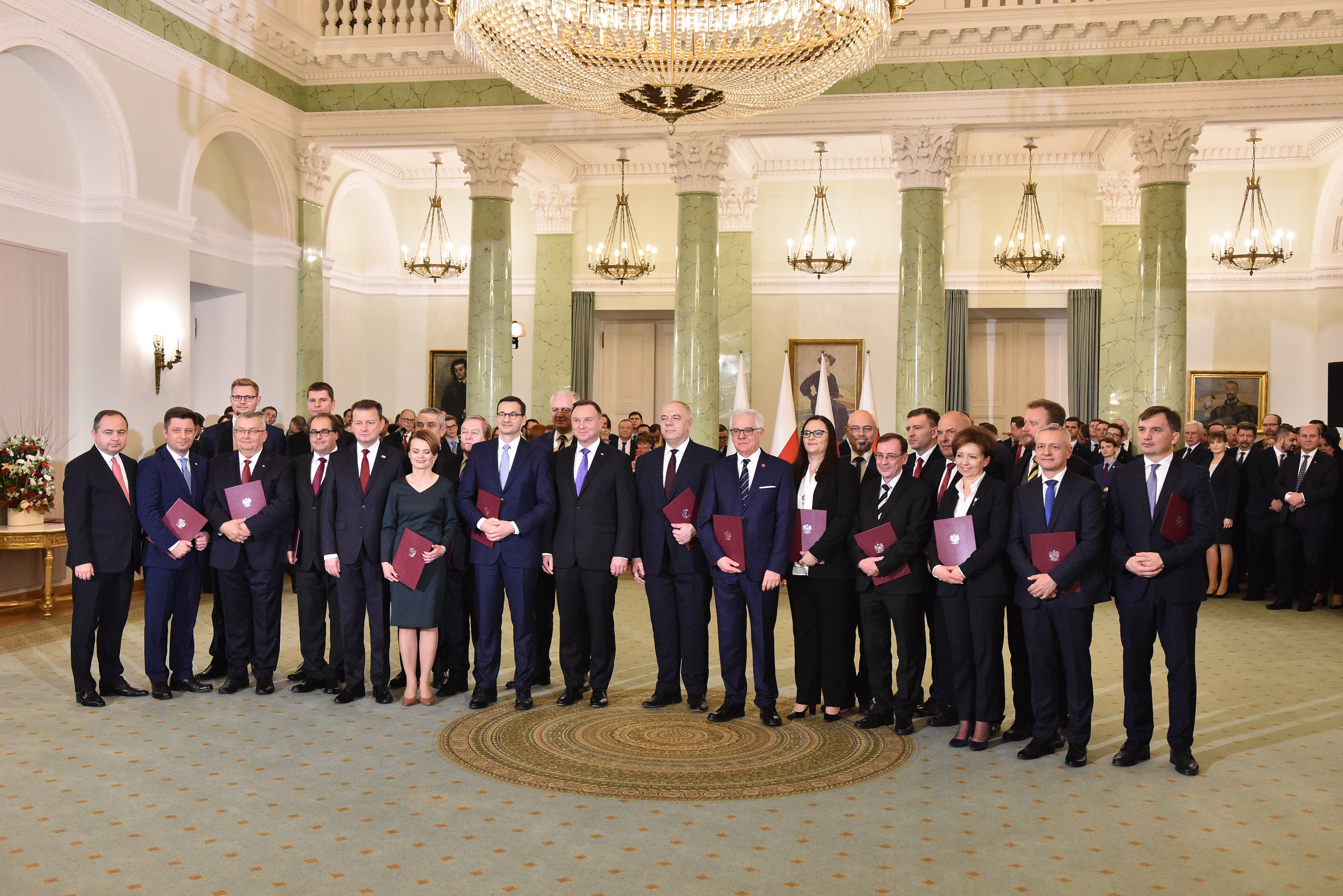
- Ministers pictured after their swearing-in, 15 November (2019)
- Date formed: 15 November 2019
- Date dissolved: 27 November 2023

People and organisations
- President: Andrzej Duda
- Prime Minister: Mateusz Morawiecki
- Prime Minister's history: 2017–2023
- Deputy Prime Minister: Piotr Gliński (2019–2023); Jacek Sasin (2019–2023); Jarosław Gowin (2019–2020, 2020–2021); Jadwiga Emilewicz (2020); Jarosław Kaczyński (2020–2022, 2023); Mariusz Błaszczak (2022–2023)
- No. of ministers: 24
- Member parties: Law and Justice Sovereign Poland Republican Party (2021–2023) Polish Affairs (2022–2023) Agreement (2019–2021); Supported by: Kukiz'15 (2021–2022)
- Status in legislature: Majority (2019–2021, Jul–Aug 2021, 2022–2023) Minority (Jun–Jul 2021, 2021–2022)
- Opposition party: Civic Coalition Democratic Left Alliance Polish Coalition Confederation
- Opposition leader: Grzegorz Schetyna (2019–2020); Borys Budka (2020–2021); Donald Tusk (2021–2023)

History
- Election: 2019 parliamentary election
- Legislature term: 9th Sejm & 10th Senate
- Predecessor: Morawiecki I
- Successor: Morawiecki III

The Second Cabinet of Mateusz Morawiecki was the government of Poland, headed by Prime Minister Mateusz Morawiecki, since being sworn in by President Andrzej Duda on 15 November 2019 until 27 November 2023. The Prime Minister delivered a statement to the Sejm on 19 November 2019 before obtaining a vote of confidence with 237 of the 460 MPs voting in the affirmative.

The government was supported by the United Right coalition consisting of Law and Justice, United Poland and the Republican Party, as well as by the Polish Affairs parliamentary group and some independent MPs. In May 2021 Kukiz'15 leader Paweł Kukiz and Law and Justice leader Jarosław Kaczyński signed a cooperation agreement between the two parties. Despite not being a part of a formal coalition and not being represented in the Council of Ministers Kukiz'15 has since supported the government especially in major votes in the Sejm.

The government underwent a reshuffle in October 2020. On 25 June 2021 the government lost its majority in the Sejm, when 3 MPs (Zbigniew Girzyński, Arkadiusz Czartoryski and Małgorzata Janowska) left Law and Justice and established a new parliamentary group (Wybór Polska, literally "Choice Poland"). The following 7 July, Czartoryski joined the Republican Party, restoring the government's majority status in the legislature.

In August 2021, a controversial bill on the amendment of the "Broadcasting and the Cinematography Act" was passed by the Sejm despite vocal opposition from Agreement, a member party of the United Right. On 11 August, Jarosław Gowin, leader of the party, was sacked from the government which in turn caused 13 other MPs to leave the governing coalition. Due to the crisis the government had once again lost its majority in the Sejm. The controversial bill was eventually vetoed by President Andrzej Duda in December 2021.

In June 2022, Agnieszka Ścigaj, the leader of Polish Affairs, was appointed a government minister. Due to the support of her parliamentary group, the government regained its formal majority status.

Following parliamentary elections in 2023, this government lost its parliamentary majority in the Sejm. However, Mateusz Morawiecki was briefly re-appointed as Prime Minister, and subsequently formed a new, very short-lived, government.

== Cabinet ==
Office	Portrait	Name	Party	In office	
Office	Portrait	Name	Party	From	To
Prime Minister		Mateusz Morawiecki	Law and Justice	November 15, 2019	November 27, 2023
Minister of Sport		Mateusz Morawiecki	Law and Justice	November 15, 2019	December 5, 2019
Minister of Digital Affairs		Mateusz Morawiecki	Law and Justice	October 6, 2020	April 3, 2023
Deputy Prime Minister		Piotr Gliński	Law and Justice	November 15, 2019	October 6, 2020
Minister of Culture and National Heritage		Piotr Gliński	Law and Justice	November 15, 2019	October 6, 2020
Chairman of the Public Benefit Committee		Piotr Gliński	Law and Justice	November 15, 2019	October 6, 2020
Deputy Prime Minister		Piotr Gliński	Law and Justice	October 6, 2020	October 26, 2021
Minister of Culture, National Heritage and Sport		Piotr Gliński	Law and Justice	October 6, 2020	October 26, 2021
Chairman of the Public Benefit Committee		Piotr Gliński	Law and Justice	October 6, 2020	October 26, 2021
Deputy Prime Minister		Piotr Gliński	Law and Justice	October 26, 2021	November 27, 2023
Minister of Culture and National Heritage		Piotr Gliński	Law and Justice	October 26, 2021	November 27, 2023
Chairman of the Public Benefit Committee		Piotr Gliński	Law and Justice	October 26, 2021	November 27, 2023
Deputy Prime Minister		Jarosław Gowin	Agreement	November 15, 2019	April 8, 2020
Minister of Science and Higher Education		Jarosław Gowin	Agreement	November 15, 2019	April 8, 2020
Deputy Prime Minister		Jarosław Gowin	Agreement	October 6, 2020	August 11, 2021
Minister of Development, Labor and Technology		Jarosław Gowin	Agreement	October 6, 2020	August 11, 2021
Deputy Prime Minister		Jacek Sasin	Law and Justice	November 15, 2019	November 27, 2023
Minister of State Assets		Jacek Sasin	Law and Justice	November 15, 2019	November 27, 2023
Minister of National Defence		Mariusz Błaszczak	Law and Justice	November 15, 2019	November 27, 2023
Deputy Prime Minister		Mariusz Błaszczak	Law and Justice	June 22, 2022	November 27, 2023
Minister of Infrastructure		Andrzej Adamczyk	Law and Justice	November 15, 2019	November 27, 2023
Minister of Agriculture and Rural Development		Jan Ardanowski	Law and Justice	November 15, 2019	October 6, 2020
Minister of Foreign Affairs		Jacek Czaputowicz	Independent	November 15, 2019	August 26, 2020
Minister without portfolio		Michał Dworczyk	Law and Justice	November 15, 2019	November 27, 2023
Minister of Development		Jadwiga Emilewicz	Independent	November 15, 2019	October 6, 2020
Deputy Prime Minister		Jadwiga Emilewicz	Independent	April 9, 2020	October 6, 2020
Minister of Marine Economy and Inland Navigation		Marek Gróbarczyk	Law and Justice	November 15, 2019	October 6, 2020
Minister of Funds and Regional Policy		Małgorzata Jarosińska-Jedynak	Independent	November 15, 2019	October 6, 2020
Minister without portfolio		Mariusz Kamiński	Law and Justice	November 15, 2019	November 27, 2023
Minister of Interior and Administration		Mariusz Kamiński	Law and Justice	November 15, 2019	November 27, 2023
Minister of Finance		Tadeusz Kościński	Independent	November 15, 2019	October 6, 2020
Minister of Finance, Funds and Regional Policy		Tadeusz Kościński	Independent	October 6, 2020	October 26, 2021
Minister of Finance		Tadeusz Kościński	Independent	October 26, 2021	February 9, 2022
Minister of Climate		Michał Kurtyka	Independent	November 15, 2019	October 6, 2020
Minister of Climate and Environment		Michał Kurtyka	Independent	October 6, 2020	October 26, 2021
Minister of Family, Labor and Social Policy		Marlena Maląg	Law and Justice	November 15, 2019	October 6, 2020
Minister of Family and Social Policy		Marlena Maląg	Law and Justice	October 6, 2020	November 27, 2023
Minister of National Education		Dariusz Piontkowski	Law and Justice	November 15, 2019	October 19, 2020
Minister without portfolio		Łukasz Schreiber	Law and Justice	November 15, 2019	November 27, 2023
Minister of Health		Łukasz Szumowski	Independent	November 15, 2019	August 20, 2020
Minister without portfolio		Konrad Szymański	Law and Justice	November 15, 2019	March 4, 2020
Minister for European Affairs		Konrad Szymański	Law and Justice	March 5, 2020	October 13, 2022
Minister for European Affairs		Szymon Szynkowski vel Sęk	Law and Justice	October 13, 2022	November 27, 2023
Minister without portfolio		Michał Woś	United Poland	November 15, 2019	March 4, 2020
Minister of Environment		Michał Woś	United Poland	March 5, 2020	October 6, 2020
Minister of Digital Affairs		Marek Zagórski	Law and Justice	November 15, 2019	October 6, 2020
Minister of Justice		Zbigniew Ziobro	United Poland	November 15, 2019	November 27, 2023
Minister of Sport		Danuta Dmowska-Andrzejuk	Independent	December 5, 2019	October 6, 2020
Minister of Science and Higher Education		Wojciech Murdzek	Agreement	April 16, 2020	October 19, 2020
Minister of Health		Adam Niedzielski	Independent	August 26, 2020	August 11, 2023
Minister of Health		Katarzyna Sójka	Law and Justice	August 10, 2023	November 27, 2023
Minister of Foreign Affairs		Zbigniew Rau	Independent	August 26, 2020	November 27, 2023
Deputy Prime Minister		Jarosław Kaczyński	Law and Justice	October 6, 2020	June 19, 2022
Minister without portfolio		Michał Cieślak	The Republicans	October 6, 2020	June 15, 2022
Minister of Agriculture and Rural Development		Grzegorz Puda	Law and Justice	October 6, 2020	October 26, 2021
Minister of Funds and Regional Policy		Grzegorz Puda	Law and Justice	October 26, 2021	November 27, 2023
Minister without portfolio		Michał Wójcik	United Poland	October 6, 2020	November 27, 2023
Minister of Science and Higher Education		Przemysław Czarnek	Law and Justice	October 19, 2020	November 27, 2023
Deputy Prime Minister		Henryk Kowalczyk	Law and Justice	October 26, 2021	November 27, 2023
Minister of Agriculture and Rural Development		Henryk Kowalczyk	Law and Justice	October 26, 2021	April 3, 2023
Minister of Agriculture and Rural Development		Robert Telus	Law and Justice	April 3, 2023	November 27, 2023
Minister of Sport and Tourism		Kamil Bortniczuk	The Republicans	October 26, 2021	November 27, 2023
Minister of Climate and Environment		Anna Moskwa	Independent	October 26, 2021	November 27, 2023
Minister of Development and Technology		Piotr Nowak	Independent	October 26, 2021	April 7, 2022
Minister of Development and Technology		Waldemar Buda	Law and Justice	April 8, 2022	November 27, 2023
Minister of Finance		Magdalena Rzeczkowska	Independent	April 26, 2022	November 27, 2023
Minister without portfolio		Włodzimierz Tomaszewski	The Republicans	June 17, 2022	November 27, 2023
Minister without portfolio		Zbigniew Hoffmann	Law and Justice	June 22, 2022	November 27, 2023
Minister without portfolio		Agnieszka Ścigaj	Polish Affairs	June 22, 2022	November 27, 2023
Minister of Digital Affairs		Janusz Cieszyński	Law and Justice	April 3, 2023	November 27, 2023

== Votes of confidence ==
Vote of confidence in the Second Cabinet of Mateusz Morawiecki
Ballot →	19 November 2019
Required majority →	228 out of 454
Votes in favour: • PiS (235); • KO (2)	237 / 454
Votes against: • KO (129); • Lewica (47); • PSL (27); • KWiN (11)	214 / 454
Abstentions: • KO (1); • PSL (1); • Non-attached (1)	3 / 454

Vote of confidence in the Second Cabinet of Mateusz Morawiecki
Ballot →	4 June 2020
Required majority →	229 out of 456
Votes in favour: • PiS (235)	235 / 456
Votes against: • KO (134); • Lewica (48); • PSL (28); • KWiN (9)	219 / 456
Abstentions: • Lewica (1); • Non-attached (1)	2 / 456

== Policy ==
=== Restitution ===
In June 2021, Poland proposed a law to put a 10-to-30 year statute of limitation on restitution claims, which would therefore nullify cases regarding property seized during World War II, which Israel's Foreign Minister Yair Lapid described as “immoral and a disgrace.” Polish Prime Minister Mateusz Morawiecki said “I can only say that as long as I am the prime minister, Poland will not pay for German crimes: Neither zloty, nor euro, nor dollar.” Lapid also said, “We are fighting for the memory of the Holocaust victims, for the pride of our people, and we won't allow any parliament to pass laws whose goal is to deny the Holocaust.” The proposed law would nevertheless also prevent people whose property was confiscated by the Polish communist government (1944–1989) from getting their lost property restituted/compensated.

Poland's President Andrzej Duda finally signed the law on 14 August. In response, Israel recalled its envoy from Poland and told the Polish ambassador not to return. Nevertheless, Poland returned its envoy to Israel in July 2022 as a sign of rapprochement in bilateral relations.

=== Media law ===
In July 2021, a group of Law and Justice MPs submitted a draft of a bill on the amendment of the "Broadcasting and the Cinematography Act", which intended to prevent entities based outside the European Economic Area from owning more than 49% of shares in Polish radio and television stations. The measure was widely seen as a step against Discovery-owned television station TVN, highly critical of the ruling party, which would force the American company to divest its ownership. Law and Justice denied those accusations, claiming the bill's goal was to prevent non-EU countries, such as Russia and China, from acquiring Polish media.

In August 2021, the bill was passed in the Sejm with a vote of 228 to 216 with 10 abstentions. The amendment of the Agreement Party, a United Right ruling coalition member, which would allow companies from countries in the Organisation for Economic Co-operation and Development (OECD) to own more than 49% of shares in Polish media companies was also rejected. This resulted in sacking of Agreement's leader Jarosław Gowin from the government and a political crisis.

In September 2021, the Senate voted to reject the bill with a vote of 53 to 37 with 3 abstentions. The Sejm once again voted to pass the bill with a vote of 229 to 212 with 11 abstentions, achieving an absolute majority and overriding the Senate's veto. On December 27, amid widespread protests, President Andrzej Duda decided to veto the bill.

=== Social ===
In July 2020, Minister of Justice Zbigniew Ziobro declared he would begin preparing the formal process for Poland to withdraw from the Istanbul Convention. He claimed the treaty is harmful because it "requires that schools teach children about gender in an ideological way" and that it "de-emphasizes biological sex". On July 30, Prime Minister Morawiecki motioned for the Constitutional Tribunal to decide whether the Convention violated the Polish Constitution. As of August 2022 the case remains undecided.

In March 2021, the Ministry of Justice prepared a bill banning same-sex couples from adopting children, saying “this solution corresponds to the views of the vast majority of Polish society”. As of August 2022 the bill hasn't been put to a vote in the Sejm.

In April 2022 United Poland part of the ruling government called for tougher blasphemy laws in Poland, such as three-year jail terms for insulting church or interrupting mass.

In October 2022, they submitted a citizens' legislative initiative for the tougher blasphemy laws with close to 400,000 signatures to parliament.

=== Education ===
In 2021 the Przemysław Czarnek Education Ministry proposed a reform of the Polish educational system, dubbed in Polish media "Lex Czarnek". It has been described as controversial due to its implied criticism of the teachings on liberal issues such as LGBT rights and sex education. it was vetoed by the President Andrzej Duda in 2022.
