= Ministry of Climate (Poland) =

Former government ministry of Poland

- Ministerstwo Klimatu
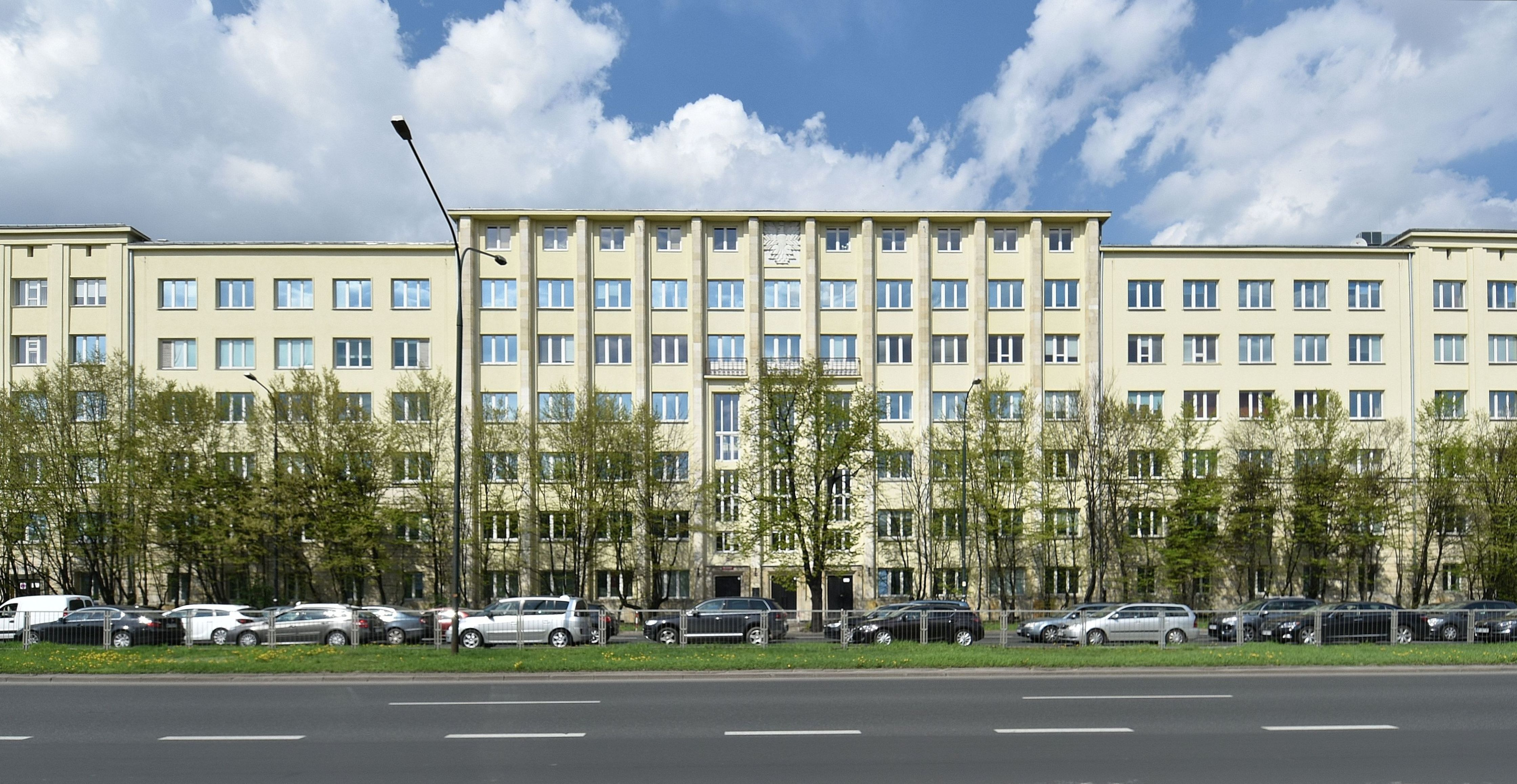

Agency overview
- Formed: November 15, 2019
- Dissolved: October 7, 2020
- Headquarters: Warsaw, Poland
- Agency executive: Piotr Dziadzio, Jacek Ozdoba, Ireneusz Zyska
- Website: https://www.gov.pl/web/klimat

The Ministry of Climate (MoC) was a Polish government ministry responsible for energy and climate protection from 2019 to 2020.

The ministry was established on November 15, 2019, formally created by transforming the former Ministry of the Environment. In March 2020, the Ministry began overseeing the areas of government administration: energy (previously within the scope of the abolished Ministry of Energy) and climate.

On October 6, 2020, the departments of the Ministry of Climate (energy and climate) were again merged with the environment department, forming the Ministry of Climate and Environment. On October 7, 2020, with retroactive effect from the previous day, a Council of Ministers regulation came into force, which repealed the regulation establishing the Ministry of Climate.

== Establishment of the ministry ==
The Ministry of Climate was established on November 15, 2019, with the formation of the Second Cabinet of Mateusz Morawiecki. The minister appointed was the former secretary of state in the Ministry of Environment, Michał Kurtyka. For several months, the Ministry continued to fulfil the functions of the Ministry of the Environment. On January 23, 2020, the Polish Sejm passed a law amending the law on government administration departments, which introduced the climate department and added the scope covering this department (effective February 29, 2020). This placed responsibilities for climate policy and sustainable development under the Ministry of Climate's jurisdiction, while environmental protection matters remained under the Ministry of Environment, including nature conservation and management of natural resources such as forests and geological resources, as well as oversight of State Forests and the General Directorate for Environmental Protection and relevant institutes. With the inclusion of the energy department from the Ministry of State Assets, the Ministry of Climate also dealt with national energy matters.

The Ministry of Climate was dissolved on October 6, 2020, forming the Ministry of Climate and Environment, which again included water management in its competencies. On October 7, 2020, with retroactive effect from October 6, 2020, a Council of Ministers regulation came into force, repealing the regulation establishing the Ministry of Climate.

== Leadership ==
- Piotr Dziadzio – secretary of state, chief geologist of the country, since November 19, 2019
- Ireneusz Zyska (PiS) – secretary of state, Government Plenipotentiary for Renewable Energy Sources since November 27, 2019
- Jacek Ozdoba (Sovereign Poland) – secretary of state since January 29, 2020
- Adam Guibourgé-Czetwertyński – undersecretary of state since November 27, 2019
- Grzegorz Mroczek – general director since November 19, 2019

== Responsibilities ==
The activities of the Ministry of Climate covered a wide range of issues, primarily the protection and rational use of environmental resources – air, living nature, and mineral resources. Climate-related tasks also include sustainable development, climate policy, including adaptation to climate change, forestry, and hunting.

== Organizational structure ==
The ministry comprised the Minister's Political Cabinet and the following organizational units:

- Budget and Finance Department
- Heating Department
- Education and Communication Department
- Power Engineering Department
- Electromobility and Hydrogen Economy Department
- Nuclear Energy Department
- European Funds Department
- Waste Management Department
- Environmental Instruments Department
- Air Protection and Urban Policy Department
- Renewable Energy Department
- Legal Department
- Oil and Gas Department
- International Affairs Department
- Defense, Crisis Management, and Classified Information Protection Department
- Climate Transformation Strategy and Planning Department
- Office of the General Director
- Control and Audit Office
- Minister's Office

== Supervised institutions ==
The climate minister supervised the following institutions:

- National Atomic Energy Agency
- General Inspectorate of Environmental Protection
- Institute of Environmental Protection
- Institute of Industrial Ecology
- National Fund for Environmental Protection and Water Management and provincial funds for environmental protection and water management
