= Alvin Gajadhur =

Polish politician, civil servant, and educator (born 1973)

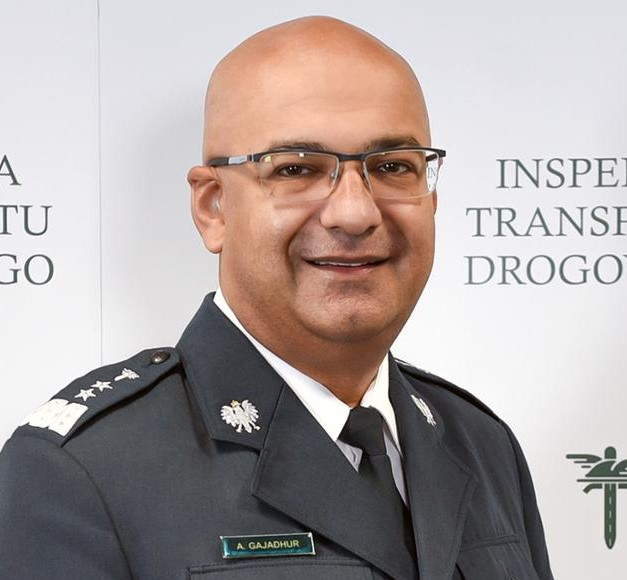
- Alvin Gajadhur

Chief Inspector of Road Transport of Poland
- In office 17 January 2017 – 4 January 2024
- Prime Minister: Mateusz Morawiecki; Donald Tusk
- Preceded by: Himself (acting); Tomasz Połeć
- Succeeded by: Artur Czapiewski

Chief Inspector of Road Transport of Poland
- Acting
- In office 7 April 2016 – 17 January 2017
- Prime Minister: Beata Szydło
- Preceded by: Tomasz Połeć
- Succeeded by: Himself

Minister of Infrastructure of Poland
- In office 27 November 2023 – 13 December 2023
- Prime Minister: Mateusz Morawiecki
- Preceded by: Andrzej Adamczyk
- Succeeded by: Dariusz Klimczak

Personal details
- Born: 3 July 1973 (age 53) London, England
- Party: Independent
- Other political affiliations: Law and Justice
- Education: Warsaw University of Technology
- Occupation: Politician; Statesman; Chemical engineer; Educator

Alvin Gajadhur (Polish: [ɡaˈja.dur]; born 3 July 1973) is a Polish politician, civil servant, chemical engineer, and educator. From 2017 to 2024, he served as the Chief Inspector of Road Transport of Poland, and in 2023, he was the Minister of Infrastructure. He is an Independent politician, associated with the Law and Justice party.

== Early life and education ==
Alvin Gajadhur was born on 3 July 1973 in London, England, as the son of Polish mother, Zofia, and Indian father, Anirood, and grew up in Poland. He graduated from the St. Augustin General Education High School in Warsaw, and later, from the Warsaw University of Technology with degrees in chemical engineering, and management and marketing. In 2003, he received a title of a habilitated doctor in chemistry from the same university. He also completed the training for candidates for road transport inspectors.

== Career ==
Gajadhur has lectured on road transport, marketing, and public relations. From 2002 to 2016, he was the spokesperson for the Chief Inspector of Road Transport. From 2007 to 2012, he also served as a public relations advisor to the President of the Office of Rail Transport. In 2013, together with Mariusz Sokołowski and Klaudia Podkalicka, he co-hosted the TVP3 Warszawa educational programme Szkoła Przetrwania, concerning the road safety, and also wrote a blog for the web portal Onet.pl. He actively posts on social media, including on TikTok.

Gajadhur unsuccessfully ran in the 2011 parliamentary election for a seat in the Sejm of Poland in the constituency no. 19, as a candidate of the Law and Justice party. He received 564 votes (0.06%). On 6 January 2016, he became acting Chief Inspector of Road Transport, following the dismissal of Tomasz Połeć, and was appointed to the role on 7 April 2017.

In the 2023 election, he ran unsuccessfully for a seat in the Senate of Poland in the constituency no. 43, as independent candidate on the Law and Justice electoral list. He received 78,293 votes (25.3%). On 27 November 2023, he was appointed as the Minister of Infrastructure in the third cabinet of Mateusz Morawiecki, serving until 13 December 2023. On 4 January 2024, he was also dismissed as the Chief Inspector of Road Transport. In February 2024, he was appointed as the social advisor of the President of Poland Andrzej Duda. In August 2025, following the election of president Karol Nawrocki, he was re-appointed to the same office in his administration. Additionally, in 2024, he unsuccessfully ran for the office of a member of the European Parliament, in the constituency no. 4, as a candidate on the Law and Justice electoral list.

In January 2025, criminal proceedings were initiated against him for allegedly publishing classified information on the social media platform Twitter in February and March 2024. This included official correspondence of the employees of the Chief Inspectorate of Road Transport, and a letter from February 2016 addressed to the then Minister of Infrastructure and Construction, which, according to the investigators, were intended solely for internal use. Gajadhur pleaded not guilty to the charges, and in August 2025, the Warsaw Regional Court dismissed the proceedings without a final judgment, stating that there were no elements of a crime in the case.

== Personal life ==
He identifies as Roman Catholic.

== Awards and decorations ==
- Knight's Cross of the Order of Polonia Restituta (2025, Poland)

== Electoral history ==
Electoral history of Alvin Gajadhur
Year	Office		Party	Constituency	Votes			Result	Ref.
Year	Office		Party	Constituency	Total	%	P.	Result	Ref.
2011	Sejm of Poland	7th	Law and Justice	No. 19	564	0.06	75th	Lost	
2023	Senate of Poland	11th	Law and Justice	No. 43	78,293	25.3	2nd	Lost	
2024	European Parliament	10th	Law and Justice	No. 4	6,182	0.47	25th	Lost	
