= Third Morawiecki cabinet =

Caretaker government of Poland in 2023

Third Cabinet of Mateusz Morawiecki
- 21st Cabinet of Poland
- November – December 2023
- Date formed: 27 November 2023
- Date dissolved: 13 December 2023

People and organisations
- President: Andrzej Duda
- Prime Minister: Mateusz Morawiecki
- No. of ministers: 18
- Member parties: Law and Justice; Sovereign Poland; Renew PR; Republican Party; Polish Affairs
- Status in legislature: Minority
- Opposition parties: Civic Coalition; Poland 2050; Polish Coalition; The Left; Confederation
- Opposition leader: Donald Tusk

History
- Election: 2023 parliamentary election
- Legislature term: 10th Sejm & 11th Senate
- Predecessor: Morawiecki II
- Successor: Tusk III

The third Cabinet of Mateusz Morawiecki was the caretaker government of Poland, headed by Prime Minister Mateusz Morawiecki, after his re-appointment by President Andrzej Duda on 27 November 2023. Two weeks later, on December 11, 2023, Morawiecki failed to receive a vote of confidence, with 266 of the 460 MPs voting against.

The government was supported by the United Right coalition composed of Morawiecki's Law and Justice, Sovereign Poland and support from Renew PR, Polish Affairs and the Republican Party. It also had the support of some independent MPs. Members of Law and Justice and Sovereign Poland held cabinet posts.

It was formed in the aftermath of the 2023 Polish parliamentary election, in which the United Right lost the outright majority it had held since 2015. The United Right is 40 seats short of a majority in the chamber; all other groups in the Sejm have ruled out cooperation with United Right, making it mathematically impossible for Morawiecki to form a majority government. The four main opposition parties–Civic Coalition, Poland 2050, Polish People's Party, and The Left–stated their intent to oppose Morawiecki and instead support a government headed by former Prime Minister and European Council President Donald Tusk. The four parties signed a coalition agreement on 10 November and agreed to put Tusk forward as their candidate for prime minister; between them, they command a majority in the Sejm.

The move by Duda to designate Morawiecki as prime minister even though he lacked enough support in the Sejm was criticized by opposition and some media as an attempt to delay the transition of power for as long as possible. Duda insisted that he upheld longstanding convention by inviting the largest party to form a government.

Mateusz Morawiecki's third government included the largest number of women in Poland's history with 10 out of the 18 ministers being female.

Morawiecki's third government was dubbed the "two-week" or "zombie government" by various media, due to its anticipated short-livedness.

Morawiecki's proposed cabinet lost a vote of no confidence in the Sejm on 11 December by 190 votes to 266, paving the way for the Sejm to propose Donald Tusk as its nominee for prime minister. Tusk's nomination as Prime Minister was subsequently confirmed by the Sejm, with 248 votes in favour and 201 against. Morawiecki's government remained in a caretaker role, until Tusk's newly-assembled government was officially sworn in on 13 December.

== Cabinet ==
Office	Name	Party	In office	
Office	Name	Party	From	To
Prime Minister	Mateusz Morawiecki	Law and Justice	27 November 2023	13 December 2023
Minister without portfolio	Izabela Antos	Independent	27 November 2023	13 December 2023
Minister of National Defence	Mariusz Błaszczak	Law and Justice	27 November 2023	13 December 2023
Minister of Family and Social Policy	Dorota Bojemska	Independent	27 November 2023	13 December 2023
Minister of Culture and National Heritage	Dominika Chorosińska	Law and Justice	27 November 2023	13 December 2023
Chairwoman of the Public Benefit Committee	Dominika Chorosińska	Law and Justice	27 November 2023	13 December 2023
Minister of Sport and Tourism	Danuta Dmowska-Andrzejuk	Independent	27 November 2023	13 December 2023
Minister of Infrastructure	Alvin Gajadhur	Independent	27 November 2023	13 December 2023
Minister of Agriculture and Rural Development	Anna Gembicka	Law and Justice	27 November 2023	13 December 2023
Minister of Funds and Regional Policy	Małgorzata Jarosińska-Jedynak	Independent	27 November 2023	13 December 2023
Minister of Finance	Andrzej Kosztowniak	Law and Justice	27 November 2023	13 December 2023
Minister of Health	Ewa Krajewska	Independent	27 November 2023	13 December 2023
Minister of Climate and Environment	Anna Łukaszewska-Trzeciakowska	Independent	27 November 2023	13 December 2023
Minister of Economic Development and Technology	Marlena Maląg	Law and Justice	27 November 2023	13 December 2023
Minister of State Assets	Marzena Małek	Independent	27 November 2023	13 December 2023
Minister without portfolio	Jacek Ozdoba	Sovereign Poland	27 November 2023	13 December 2023
Minister of Education and Higher Education	Krzysztof Szczucki	Law and Justice	27 November 2023	13 December 2023
Minister of Interior and Administration	Paweł Szefernaker	Law and Justice	27 November 2023	13 December 2023
Minister of Foreign Affairs	Szymon Szynkowski vel Sęk	Law and Justice	27 November 2023	13 December 2023
Minister of Justice	Marcin Warchoł	Sovereign Poland	27 November 2023	13 December 2023

== Vote of confidence ==
Vote of confidence in the Third Cabinet of Mateusz Morawiecki
Ballot →	11 December 2023
Required majority →	229 out of 456
Votes in favour: • PiS (187); • Kukiz'15 (3)	190 / 456
Votes against: • KO (157); • KP (33); • PL2050 (32); • Lewica (26); • KWiN (18)	266 / 456
Absent: • PiS (3)	3 / 459
