= Cabinet of Mateusz Morawiecki =

- First Cabinet of Mateusz Morawiecki
- Second Cabinet of Mateusz Morawiecki
- Third Cabinet of Mateusz Morawiecki
