= Anna Moskwa =

Polish minister of climate and environment

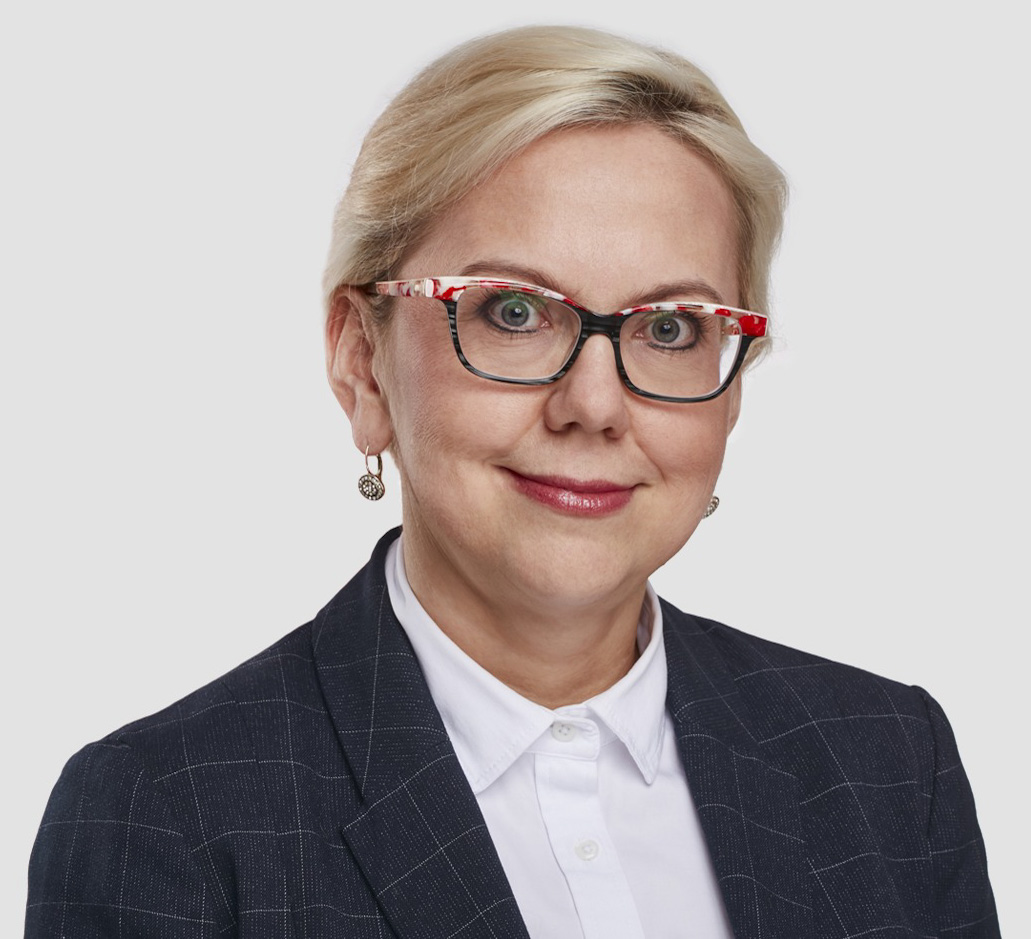

Minister of Climate and Environment
- In office 26 October 2021 – 27 November 2023
- Prime Minister: Mateusz Morawiecki
- Preceded by: Michał Kurtyka
- Succeeded by: Anna Łukaszewska-Trzeciakowska

Personal details
- Born: 27 May 1979 (age 47) Zamość, Poland
- Education: Catholic University of Lublin; Maria Curie-Skłodowska U.; University of Warsaw; Lazarski University

Anna Moskwa (born 27 May 1979 in Zamość, Poland) is a Polish politician who served as the Minister of Climate and Environment under Prime Minister Mateusz Morawiecki in his second cabinet from 2021 to 2023. She is the second minister to hold the position, after inaugural minister Michał Kurtyka. Moskwa has also previously served as Undersecretary of State in the Ministry of Marine Economy and Inland Navigation.

== Early life and education ==
Anna Moskwa was born on 27 May 1979 in Zamość, Poland. She graduated from Jan Zamoyski High School in the city and was a 1996 laureate of the Religious Knowledge Olympiad, one of the national School Olympiads, during her time there.

Moskwa later graduated from Catholic University of Lublin, where she studied sociology, and from Maria Curie-Skłodowska University, where she studied international relations. She attended the University of Warsaw for postgraduate studies in enterprise management. She has also earned an MBA from Lazarski University.

== Career ==
At the time she was chosen to be Minister of Climate and Environment, Moskwa had been serving as an executive at PKN Orlen, a Polish oil refiner, leading the company's offshore wind farm projects.

During the 2022 Russian invasion of Ukraine, Moskwa called for immediate sanctions on Russian oil and gas, and stated that Poland wished to set a clear deadline for the end of European Union imports of Russian oil. She also stated that the union should penalize parties paying for Russian gas in rubles, and that Poland was ready to help Germany in halting its use of Russian oil.

Also under Moskwa’s leadership, Poland filed a complaint in 2023 to the European Commission against Germany for allegedly failing to remove waste illegally transported from Germany to Poland and stored there.

== Personal life ==
Moskwa is fluent in English, French, and Spanish.
