= Ireneusz Zyska =

Polish politician and lawyer

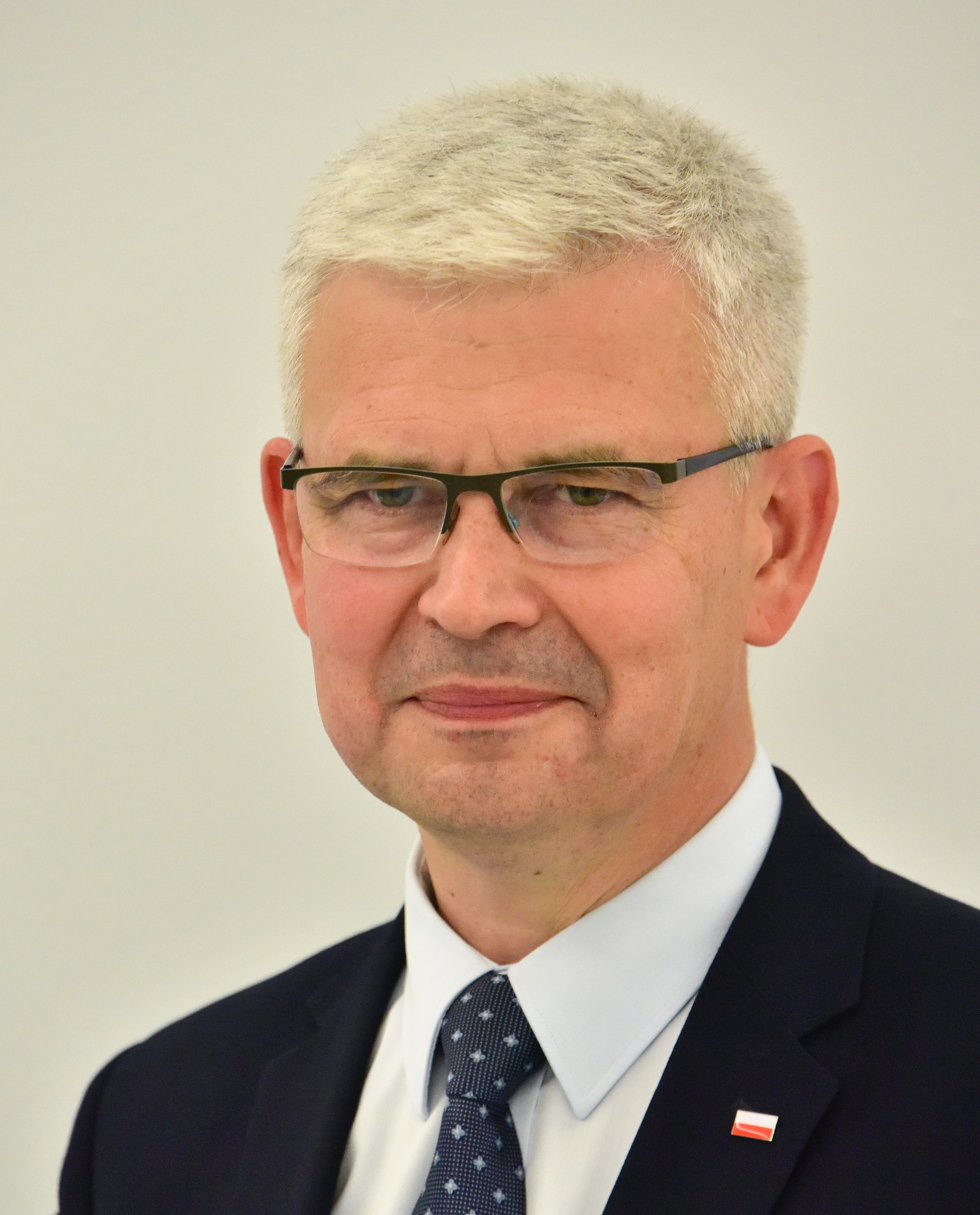

Member of the Sejm of the 8th and 9th parliamentary term
- Incumbent
- Assumed office 2015

Personal details
- Born: 5 August 1969 (age 56)
- Education: University of Wrocław
- Occupation: Politician, lawyer

Ireneusz Zyska (born 5 August 1969 in Świebodzice, Poland) is a Polish politician, lawyer, entrepreneur and local government activist, Member of the Sejm of the 8th and 9th parliamentary term, from 2019 Secretary of State in the ministries responsible for the climate.

== Biography ==
Between 1986 and 1990 he was a collaborator of Fighting Solidarity. He was active in the youth resistance movement and belonged to the Independent Youth Movement. From 1990 to 1994 and from 1998 to 2000, he ran his own commercial enterprise. From 1996 to 1997, he was a member of the board of the Wałbrzych branch of the Movement for Polish Reconstruction. In 2002, he graduated from the Faculty of Law and Administration at Wrocław University, and in 2005 he completed postgraduate studies in real estate valuation at Wrocław School of Banking. He is qualified as a legal advisor. From 2000 to 2006 he worked successively in the legal department of one of the commercial law companies and in the office of the trustee.

In 2006 and 2010, he was elected councillor of Świebodzice on the list of the KWW Bogdan Kożuchowicz (in addition, in 2007 he ran unsuccessfully for the Sejm as a non-partisan candidate on the Law and Justice list). From 2006 to 2011, he held the position of deputy mayor of this city. After leaving office, he took up the practice of law as a legal advisor within his own law firm. He founded the Świebodzice Civic Association. In 2014, he unsuccessfully ran for mayor of Świebodzice on behalf of his own committee, and also unsuccessfully ran for the Lower Silesian Sejmik on behalf of KWW Bezpartyjni Samorządowcy.

In the 2015 parliamentary elections, he ran for the Sejm in the Wałbrzych constituency from first place on the list of the Kukiz'15 electoral committee organised by Paweł Kukiz. He won a mandate as an MP of the eighth term, receiving 7725 votes. In May 2016, he left the Kukiz'15 parliamentary club, co-founding the parliamentary circle Wolni i Solidarni (led by Kornel Morawiecki), of which he became vice-chairman. On 18 November 2016 he registered, together with Kornel Morawiecki and Małgorzata Zwiercan, a party of the same name.

In 2018, he was a Law and Justice candidate for mayor of Walbrzych. In the 21 October vote, he received 13.1% support, losing to Roman Szełoej, who won 84.5% of the vote. In December of the same year, he moved from WiS to the PiS parliamentary club. He also joined the Law and Justice party. In the 2019 parliamentary elections, he successfully ran for re-election in the same constituency, receiving 10,688 votes.

On 27 November 2019, he became Secretary of State at the Ministry of Climate (in October 2020 transformed into the Ministry of Climate and Environment). In January 2020, he became Government Plenipotentiary for Renewable Energy.
