= Kurtyka =

Kurtyka is a Polish surname. Notable people with the surname include:

- Janusz Kurtyka (1960–2010), Polish historian
- Michał Kurtyka (born 1973), Polish manager, economist and civil servant
- Wojciech Kurtyka (born 1947), Polish mountaineer and rock climber
