= Jan Krasoń =

Polish geologist known for relation to the "shale gas revolution" in Poland

Jan Krasoń (November 22, 1933, in Reducz – January 21, 2015, in Denver) was a Polish-American geologist. He was the founder and president of Geoxplorers International, Inc. known primarily for his activities related to the "shale gas revolution" in Poland. Together with his partner Ryszard A. Korol, he co-invented the "6M-EX" technology to recover precious metals from black shale and flotation tailings. He worked and lectured in over 60 countries. He authored or co-authored more than 140 scientific publications and about 300 unpublished proprietary reports.

== Life ==
Krasoń was born on November 22, 1933, in a town called Reducz near Piotrków Trybunalski into a family of farmers, and was the oldest of seven siblings. Krasoń was an opponent of communism and a practicing Catholic.

In 1945, the whole family moved to Żmigród in Lower Silesia where Krasoń attended elementary school. In order to be able to study, he undertook various jobs. One of them was working at the City and Commune Office and in a local print shop.

At the age of 14 he left for Wrocław in order to continue his high school and university education. Here he joined the Boy Scouts. He began studying geology at the University of Wrocław. Already as a student, he became an assistant to prof. Ryziewicz in the Department of Paleozoology. Then he moved to the Department of Stratigraphy, where he worked under the supervision of prof. Józef Zwierzycki. This period shaped his future career. At the same university, he earned a master's degree and defended his doctoral thesis on the extension of the Richter Bernburg cyclothems to the Lower Silesian Zechstein sediments.

From the beginning of October 1953, for the next 15 years, he worked at the Institute of Geological Sciences of the University of Wrocław. Thanks to the recommendations of prof. Zwierzycki, he was able to go to Cairo for a one-year scholarship. Together with the Cairo University staff, he participated in various types of exploratory work in various regions of the Egyptian desert.

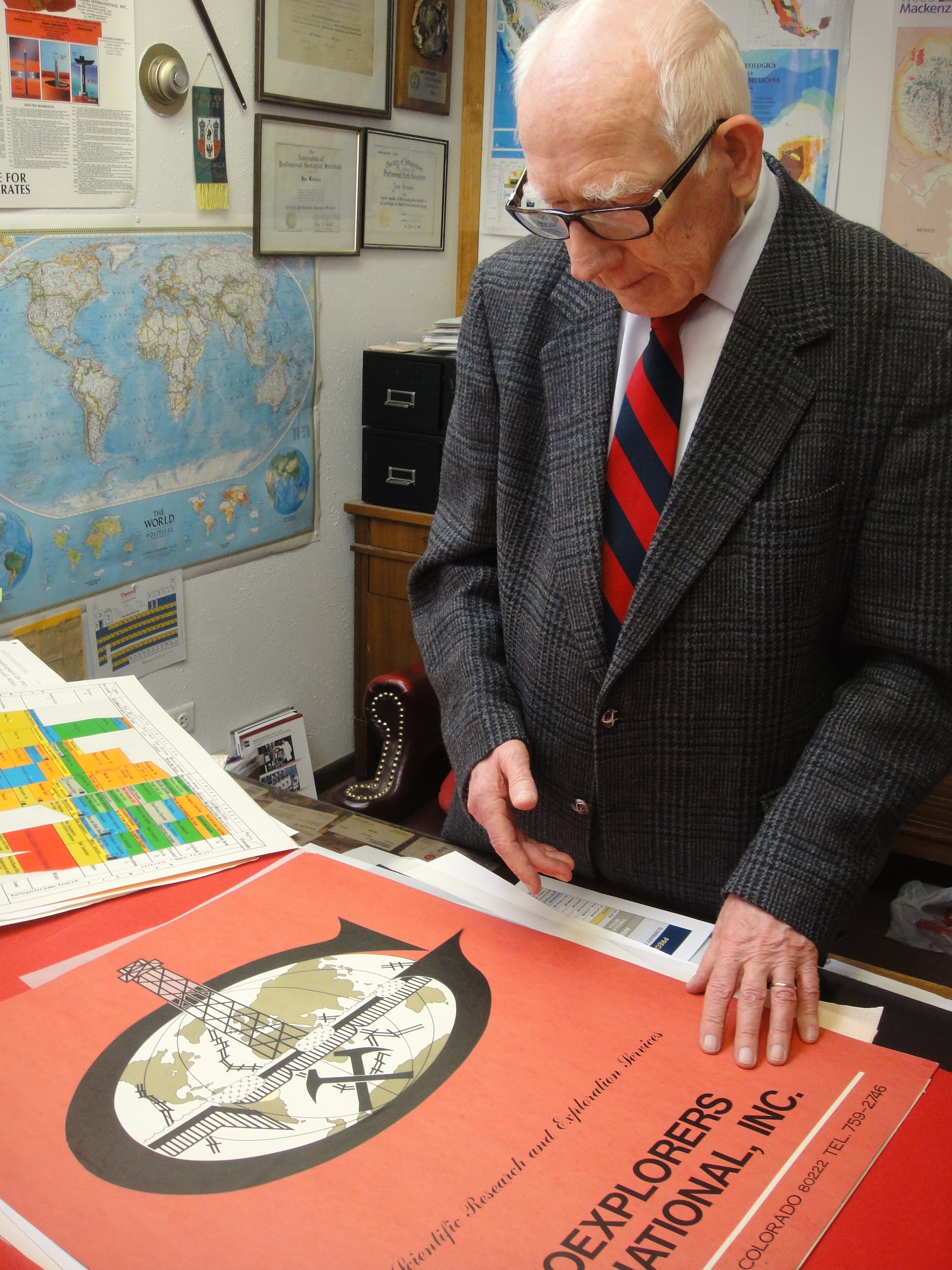
Dr. Jan Krasoń presenting the original logo design of Geoexplorers International, Inc

From 1966 to 1969 he was with his family (wife and three children) in the Kingdom of Libya. He worked there as a special geological advisor to the Libyan government. During his stay in Libya, he contributed to the discovery of the largest deposit of sodium chloride and potassium salt in Africa. The discovery was the basis for building a chemical industry with a billion-dollar investment. He also served as a government advisor on deposits and water supply. However, he had to leave the country with his family because of the outbreak of the war. Jan Krasoń and his family moved to the US (Denver, Colorado). He couldn't return to Poland for over 20 years; he was considered "persona non grata" by the Polish authorities.

In the US, Jan Krasoń worked for Texasgulf Inc. and Asarco Inc. searching for metal deposits, and from January 1973 to August 1974 for the Colorado Department of Water Resources. Finally, in 1974, he established his own company – Geoexplorers International, Inc. Soon after, he obtained American citizenship.

In the early 1980s, American bank obtained for him an invitation to the Soviet Union, issued by the Soviet Academy of Sciences. He spent his stay in Russia exploring a large part of the country, during which he collected data affecting the profitability of the extraction of various raw materials, especially precious and strategic metals. Krasoń also advised the Russians on the recovery of gold and platinum group metals (PGM) from post-mining heaps.

Even when Krasoń's father fell ill in March 1981, he couldn't return to Poland. He was also unable to get to Poland for his father's funeral. The last meeting with both parents took place many years earlier in Rome. Krasoń managed to travel to the country in the 1990s.

=== Shale gas ===
Krasoń was very interested in the energy revolution associated with shale gas and gas hydrates, also known as methane hydrates. The Japanese located the gas hydrate zone in the Nankai Trough in the earthquake zone. After a thorough analysis, Dr. Jan Krasoń estimated that methane from gas hydrates might be enough to cover the world's energy needs for 3,000 years. It was supposed to be a revolution that would dethrone the current owners of coal deposits.

Together with professor Mariusz-Orion Jędrysek, he drew the attention of American oil companies to shale gas exploration in Poland. Krasoń preceded the entire project with a thorough research of the prospects for shale gas resources in the country's Paleozoic sediments. As a result, over 100 exploration licenses were issued, and drilling projects were prepared. However, due to the introduction of restrictive legal policies by the decision makers, the exploration was impeded, and the investors withdrew from Poland.

Already in 2006, a report on shale gas extraction in Poland was prepared. Krasoń, instead of presenting it to large corporations, went with it to the Polish Ministry of the Environment. At that time, neither the Ministry nor the Polish Geological Institute had any knowledge of this subject, which is why Krasoń's discovery was considered important.

In Poland, shale gas did not begin to be talked about until 2008. A year later there was a "shale gas revolution” already underway.

== Professional activity ==
Krasoń's professional activity reached many corners of the world: Poland, the US, Russia, America, Mexico, Africa, etc. He spoke the following languages: Polish, English, and Russian. He also knew French, Spanish, and Arabic.

Krasoń mainly dealt with consultations and mining projects. He has worked with about 50 clients, primarily oil and mining companies, banks, government agencies, and various international financial institutions such as the United Nations (UN) – United Nations Development Program (UNDP), U.S. Department of the Interior - U.S. Bureau of Land Management (BLM), U.S. Department of State - U.S. Bureau of Mines.

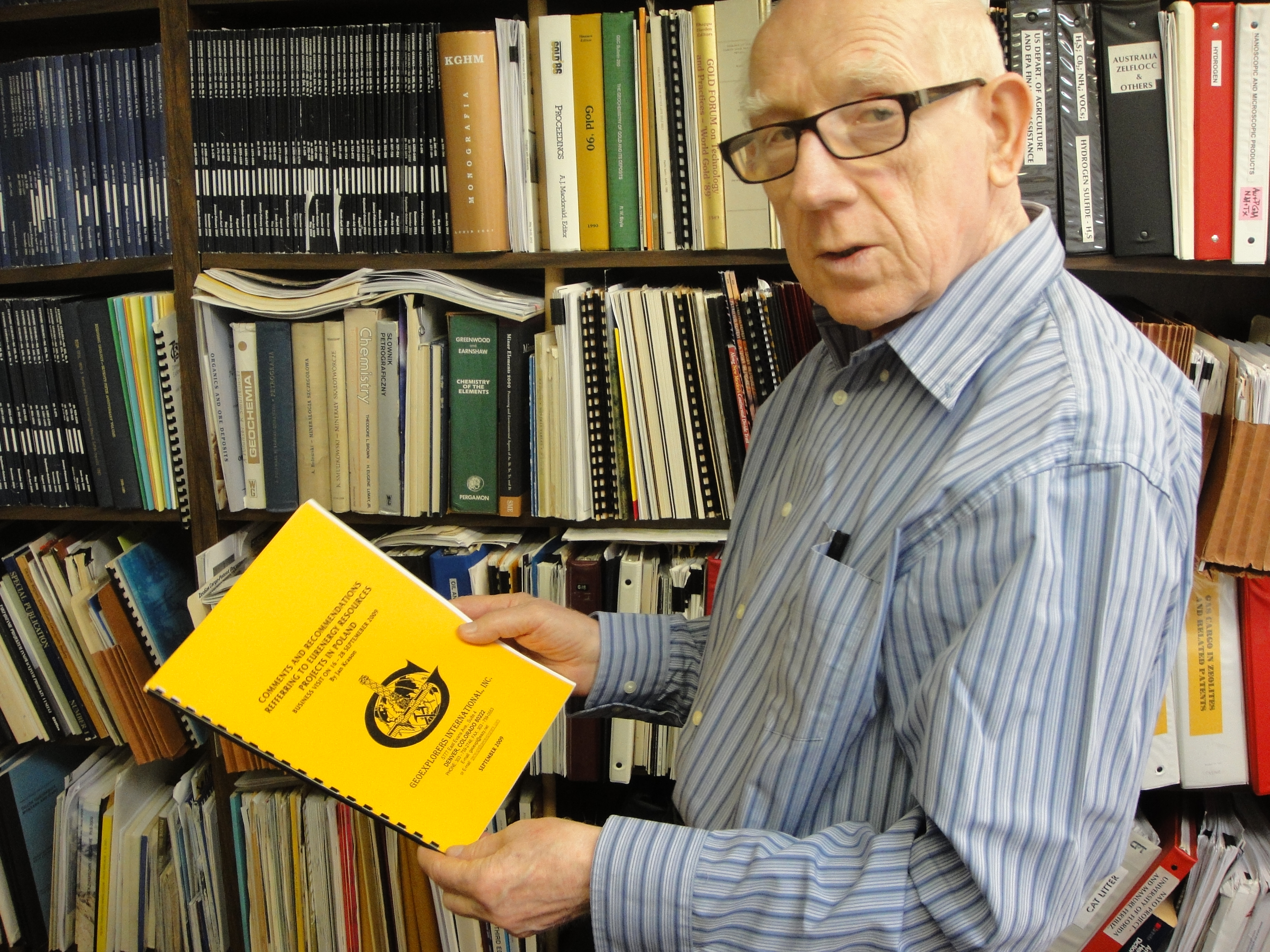
Dr. Jan Krasoń showing the Geoexplorers report - Commentary and recommendations on energy resource projects in Poland

Krasoń had over 50 years of worldwide professional experience in the exploration of, among others, economically viable base and precious metal deposits. In addition, he also had extensive professional specialization and expertise, including exploration for sediment-hosted rich in organic matter: gold, silver, and platinum group metals (PGM), as well as non-ferrous metal.

He has also had extensive experience characterizing the watershed, determining formation stability, assessing gas hydrate resources, and exploring conventional hydrocarbon deposits, especially in marine environments.

Krasoń has worked and lectured in over 60 countries. From the early 1980s, he initiated multi-million dollar mining and oil projects in the former Soviet Union, then Russia, Eastern, and Central Europe.

In October 1986, Krasoń, as an initiated speaker at the Newmont Mining Corp. Annual Conference, presented "Muruntau the World's Largest Gold Mine" in Uzbekistan and recommended that it be treated as an exploratory model. After the collapse of the Soviet Union, this presentation resulted in Newmont's involvement in a business in Muruntau, followed by the production of 500,000 ounces (18.9 tons) of gold per year.

DKrasoń has also authored and co-authored over 140 scientific publications, including geological maps, wall posters, professional articles, newsletters, books, summaries, and critical reviews. He was also the author of over 300 unpublished, proprietary reports.

Despite his international fame, Krasoń devoted most of his research to his homeland. He focused on researching and analyzing the results of shale gas. Polish resources account for almost 1/3 of European deposits, i.e., about 5.3 trillion m^{3}. These resources extend from the Świętokrzyskie Mountains in the northwest direction to the bottom of the Baltic Sea towards Sweden. They are also found in Lower Silesia. According to Krasoń "this amount should meet Poland's demand for the next 300 years and significantly reduce the costs borne by us, gas recipients."

Krasoń's activity benefiting Poland extended even further. He also devoted his time and money to the recovery of precious metals (gold, silver and platinum group metals (PGM)) from the post-flotation waste of copper mine. Dr. Krasoń took their samples and, with the results of their analysis, turned to the management of KGHM with a project of joint recovery of these precious elements.

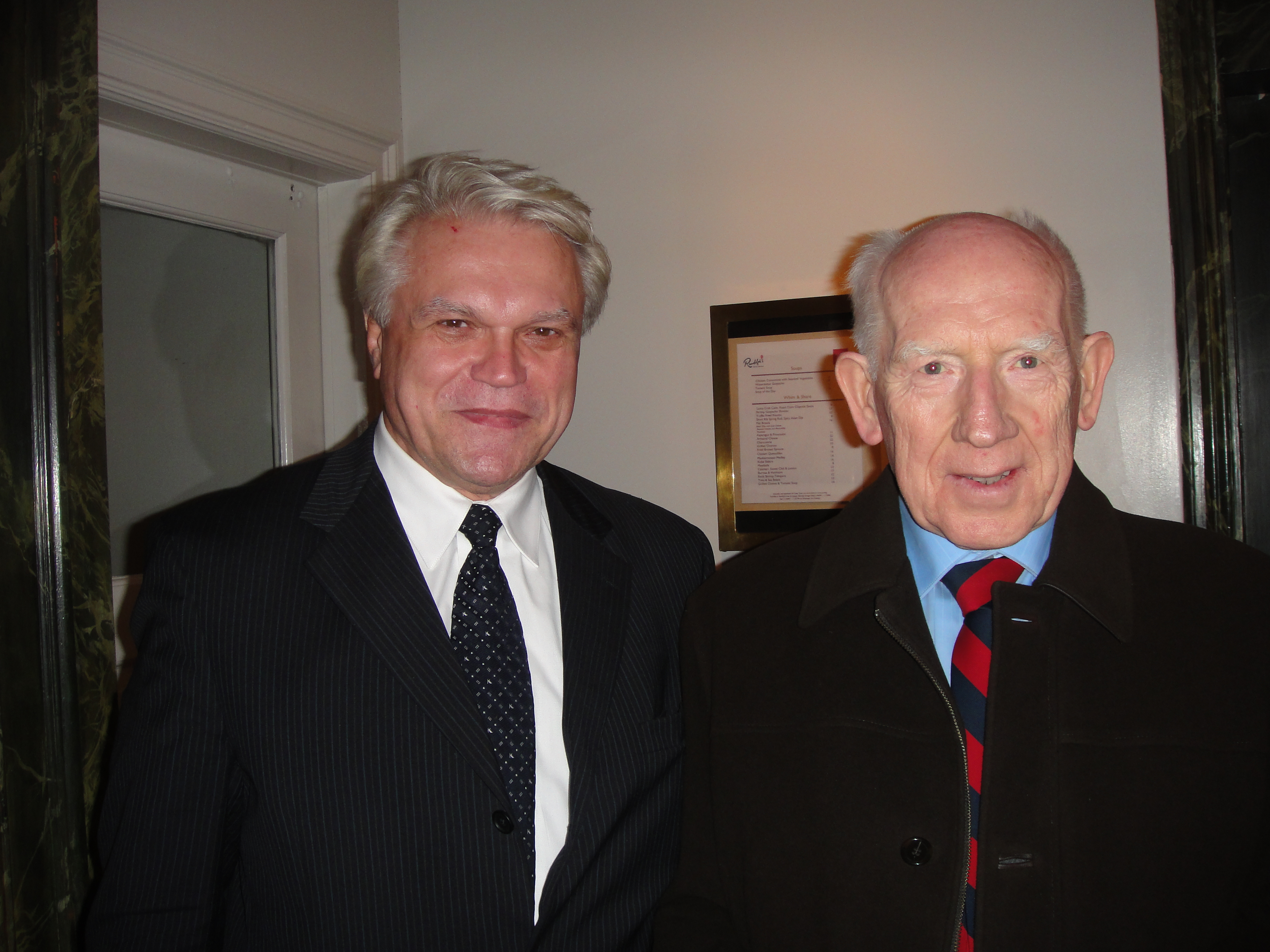
Jan Krason and Ryszard Korol

With his partner, Ryszard A. Korol, he developed a proprietary technology “6M-EX” for the recovery of these elements, which offered opportunities for billions in profits. However, the proposal was rejected by KGHM for unknown reasons.

=== Professional path ===
- October 1956 - September 1967: researcher, assistant and assistant professor, expert consultant; University of Wrocław, Wrocław, Poland (year spent at the University of Cairo).
- July 1966 to October 1969: Technical Advisor to the Government of Libya, Tripoli, Libya.
- January 1970 to March 1971: Senior Geologist, Texasgulf, Inc., Exploration Department, Denver, Colorado.
- January 1973 to August 1974: Senior Water Resource Geologist, Department of Natural Resources, Colorado, Denver, Colorado.
- From September 1974 until his death: President and CEO of Geoexplorers International, Inc.

== Later life and death ==
Krasoń had lung cancer. Refusing chemotherapy, for seven years he followed a diet to help him fight the disease. He continued to work throughout his illness. He died on January 21, 2015, in Denver. He was buried in Żmigród, Poland.

== Membership in associations ==
- American Society of Petroleum Geologists (AAPG)
- Society of Economic Geologists (SEG)
- American Geological Society (GSA)
- International Association for the Origin of Ore Deposits (IAGOD)
- Denver Association of Regional Exploration Geologists (DREGS)
- Canadian Association of Searchers and Developers (PDAC)
- Association of Mining Engineers (SME)
- Society of Rocky Mountain Geologists (RMAG)
- Polish Geological Society (PTG)

== List of projects ==
- Arizona: Report of preliminary geological exploration of copper deposits in the Roskruge Mountains (June 1970)
- Texas and Oklahoma: Summary of Copper Exploration Exploration and Drilling Recommendations in North-Central Texas and Oklahoma. (October 1971)
- Libya: Salt deposit assessment - management and supervision of all exploration phases, resulting in the discovery of 171,000,000 tons of NaCl-salt deposit and 31,000,000 tons of potassium salts in brine. (1975)
- Colorado: Assessment of the Potential of Uranium Reserves in Colorado and the Central High Plains. (January 1976)
- Uzbekistan: The economic geology of Muruntau - the world's largest gold deposit. Extensive research and an unpublished report resulted in Newmont's further investment of over $200 million and production of approximately 500,000 ounces of gold a year at a cost of $200 an ounce. (September 1984)
- Philippines: Economics of Chromite Ore Exploitation on Dinagat Island. (June 1990)
- Venezuela: Development of gold and diamond concessions in Guyana and Venezuela, Caracas. (June 1996)

== Awards ==
Krasoń received some awards in connection with his activities. Such awards include:

- Outstanding Scientist (1993)
- Medal of the "Polish Community" association (2013)
- the title "Outstanding Pole" (2013)
- Officer's Cross of Merit of the Republic of Poland (2014)

== Selected publications ==
- National uranium resource evaluation (NURE) - Dubois Quadrangle, Montana and Idaho: Co-author A. Wodzicki, U.S. Dept. of Energy, GJQ-007(81), Grand Junction, Colorado, 1981, 81 p.
- Evaluation of the geological relationships to gas hydrate formation and stabilization: in Peer Review Session (April 24- 25, 1985) on "Unconventional Gas Recovery Gas Hydrates Program"; U.S. Dept. of Energy, p. 170-240, co-author W. I. Ridley, 1985.
- Geochemistry and radioactivity of the Powhatan Area, Virginia: Virginia Division of Mineral Resources Publication 78, Commonwealth of Virginia, Charlottesville, 60 p., co-authored with S. Johnson, P. Finley, and J. D. Marr, 1988.
- Współczesne odkrycia złóż ropy i gazu zachętą do powtórnej oceny regionów naftowych Polski: Przegląd Geologiczny, vol. 62, nr 5, 2014, p 229-231
- Geoexplorers’ experience in evaluation and assessment of the mine tailings and exploration for base and precious metals deposits
- Głęboki kras synkliny bolesławieckiej w Sudetach: in Acta Geologica Polonica, Vol.15, nr 2, 1965, p 178–215. Co-author Z.Wójcik
- Application of natural and synthetic zeolites for removal of cesium and strontium: 11th Conference on Environment and Mineral Processing. [Ed. Peter Fecko, Cablik Vladimir]. Ostrava, 31.5.-2.6.2007. Co-author A. Miecznikowski, J. Jabłoński, A. Jankowska
- Sorption of NH3, SO2, CO2 and H2O on natural and synthetic zeolites: 11th Conference on Environment and Mineral Processing. [Ed. Peter Fecko, Cablik Vladimir]. Ostrava, 31.5.-2.6.2007. Co-author A. Miecznikowski, S. Ronka, A. Jankowska, J. Jabłoński
- Clinoptilolite zeolites structure and their multiple applications: 11th Conference on Environment and Mineral Processing. [Ed. Peter Fecko, Cablik Vladimir]. Ostrava, 31.5.-2.6.2007. Co-author A. Miecznikowski, R. Diduszko, J. Hanuza, K. Hermanowicz
- Applications of Modified Clinoptilolite-Rich Zeolites of Central Mexico: Chemistry and biochemistry in the agricultural production, environment protection, human and animal health. Ed. by H. Górecki, Z. Dobrzań?ski, P. Kafarski. (Chemistry for Agriculture;), Czech-Pol Trade. Co-author E. Drąg, A. Pawełczyk, A. Miecznikowski
- Sorption of Benzene and carbon Dioxide by Faujasite-type Zeolite Synthesized from Kaolinite Deposit of Central Mexico. Co-author E. Drąg, A. Pawełczyk, A. Miecznikowski
- National Uranium Resource Evaluation: Dillon Quadrangle Montana And Idaho", Co-author A.Wodzicki, April 1981
- "Geochemistry and Redioactivity in the Powhatan Area Virginia", Co-author Stanley S. Johnson, Patrick D. Finley, John D.Marr.Jr. Charlottesvi LLE. Virginia 1988
- "Geology, Energy and Mineral Resources Assessment of the Armendaris Area, New Mexico", Co-author A.Wodzicki, Susan K. Cruver. Geoexplorers International, 1982

== Sources ==
- "Jan Krasoń - oto człowiek, który wywołał w Polsce łupkową rewolucję" (in Polish). June 8, 2011.
- "Outstanding geologists Dr. Jan Krason died". January 23, 2015.
- "Zmarł wybitny geolog dr Jan Krasoń" (in Polish). January 26, 2015.
- "Dr Jan Krasoń o hydratach" (in Polish). May 22, 2017.
- "KGHM chce wydobywać gaz łupkowy ze złóż miedzi" (in Polish). April 11, 2012.
- "Jan Krasoń - "łupkowy rewolucjonista" z naszej Gminy" (in Polish). July 2011.
- "Wielki polski autorytet zaraził Amerykanów gazem łupkowym" (in Polish). June 8, 2011.
- "Adam Maksymowicz: Skarby Żelaznego Mostu" (in Polish). May 16, 2011.
- "Nieoficjalny Główny Geolog Kraju (GGK) a gaz łupkowy" (in Polish). April 14, 2011.
- "Adam Maksymowicz: Radykalna zmiana polityki KGHM" (in Polish). March 25, 2011.
- "Prezes KGHM dzień przed odwołaniem: Trzeba rozbić "układ hutniczy [WYWIAD]" (in Polish). March 12, 2018.
- "KGHM – patologiczne księstwo z układem hutniczym" (in Polish). March 12, 2018.
