= Henryk Kowalczyk =

Polish politician (born 1956)

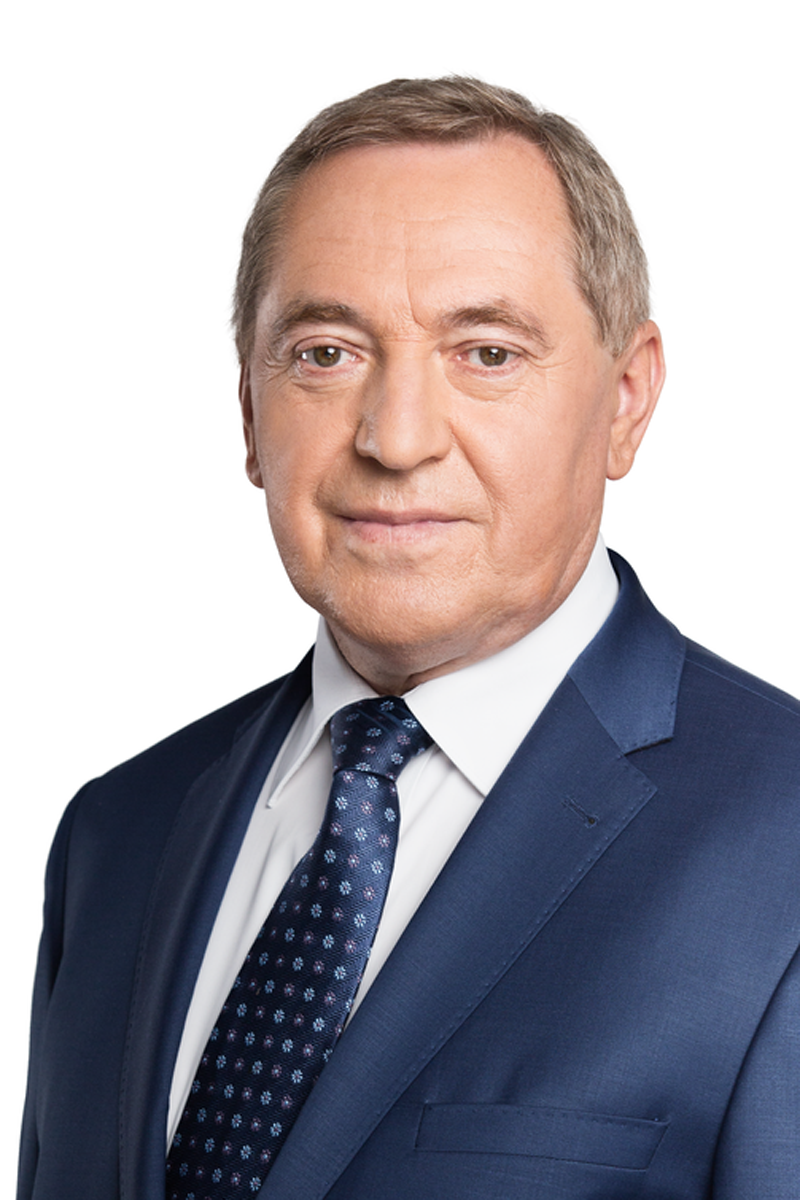

Deputy Prime Minister of Poland
- In office 26 October 2021 – 21 June 2023
- President: Andrzej Duda
- Prime Minister: Mateusz Morawiecki

Minister of Agriculture and Rural Development
- In office 26 October 2021 – 6 April 2023
- Prime Minister: Mateusz Morawiecki
- Preceded by: Grzegorz Puda
- Succeeded by: Robert Telus

Minister of Environment
- In office 9 January 2018 – 15 November 2019
- Prime Minister: Mateusz Morawiecki
- Preceded by: Jan Szyszko
- Succeeded by: Michał Kurtyka

Minister of State Treasury Acting
- In office 16 September 2016 – 31 December 2016
- President: Andrzej Duda
- Prime Minister: Beata Szydło; Mateusz Morawiecki
- Preceded by: Dawid Jackiewicz
- Succeeded by: Jacek Sasin

Minister of the Council of Ministers
- In office 16 November 2015 – 9 January 2018
- President: Andrzej Duda
- Prime Minister: Beata Szydło; Mateusz Morawiecki

Member of the Sejm
- Incumbent
- Assumed office 25 September 2005
- Constituency: 18 – Siedlce

Personal details
- Born: 15 July 1956 (age 70)
- Party: Law and Justice
- Education: University of Warsaw

Henryk Kowalczyk (Polish: [ˈxɛnrɨk kɔˈvalt͡ʂɨk]; born 15 July 1956) is a Polish politician and teacher, who serves as Deputy Prime Minister of Poland and Minister of Agriculture and Rural Development.

He was first elected to the Sejm on 25 September 2005. In 2006–2007, he was secretary of state in the Ministry of Agriculture and Rural Development. From 2015 to 2018 he was a minister without portfolio in the cabinet of Beata Szydło. At the same time, he was the chair of the Standing Committee of the Council of Ministers and vice-chair of the Economic Committee of the Council of Ministers. In 2016, he was the acting Minister of State Treasury. In the years 2018–2019, he served as the Minister of the Environment in the first government of Mateusz Morawiecki. In 2021, he was designated as the Deputy Prime Minister of Poland and Minister of Agriculture and Rural Development.

== See also ==
- Members of Polish Sejm 2005–2007
