= Paulina Hennig-Kloska =

Minister of Climate and Environment in Donald Tusk's third cabinet (since 2023)

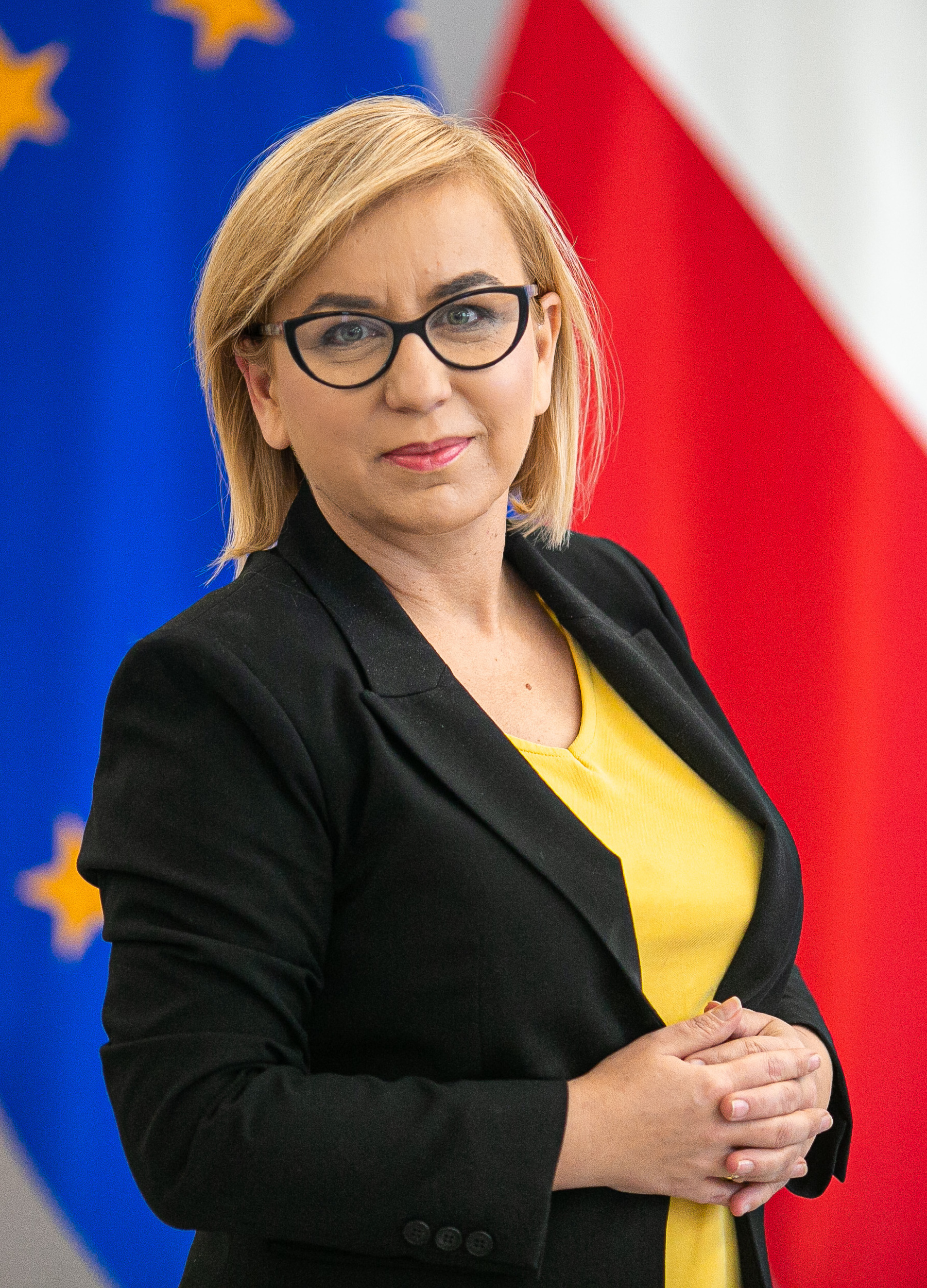
- Hennig-Kloska in 2021

Minister of Climate and Environment
- Incumbent
- Assumed office 13 December 2023
- Prime Minister: Donald Tusk
- Preceded by: Anna Łukaszewska-Trzeciakowska

Member of the Sejm
- Incumbent
- Assumed office 12 November 2015
- Constituency: 27-Konin

Personal details
- Born: 5 October 1977 (age 48) Gniezno, Poznań Voivodeship, Poland
- Party: Centre Union (Poland) (2026–present); Poland 2050 (2021–2026); Third Way (2023–2025)
- Other political affiliations: Modern (2015–2021); Civic Coalition (2018–2021)
- Profession: Politician, entrepreneur

Paulina Hennig-Kloska (born 5 October 1977) is a Polish politician and entrepreneur, a Member of Parliament (Sejm) for the 8th, 9th, and 10th terms (since 2015), and the Minister of Climate and Environment in Donald Tusk's third cabinet (since 2023).

== Biography ==
Hennig-Kloska completed her studies in political science, earning a bachelor's degree in 1999 from the Paweł Włodkowic College in Płock, and a master's degree in 2001 from Adam Mickiewicz University in Poznań. Additionally, she pursued education in financial analysis and controlling at the Poznań University of Economics and Business, graduating in 2005. She worked as a journalist for a local radio station and as the branch director of a bank in Gniezno. Later, she became involved in the private sector, serving as the general director of a commercial law company.

== Political Activity ==
In the 2015 parliamentary elections, Hennig-Kloska ran for the Sejm in the Konin district, occupying the top spot on the electoral list of the Modern party. She won a seat in the 8th term of the Sejm with 7,306 votes. On May 26, 2017, she succeeded Katarzyna Lubnauer as the spokesperson for Modern. In the 2019 elections, she successfully sought re-election as a Member of Parliament, running on behalf of the Civic Coalition and receiving 16,813 votes. In February 2021, she left the Civic Coalition parliamentary club and Modern to join the Poland 2050 party.

In the 2023 elections, Hennig-Kloska secured a parliamentary seat for the third time, running as a candidate of the Third Way coalition and receiving 30,334 votes. On December 12, 2023, the 10th term Sejm elected her as the Minister of Climate and Environment in Donald Tusk's third government. The following day, she was officially appointed to the position by the President of Poland, Andrzej Duda. In January 2024, she was further appointed by the President as a member of the Council for Social Dialogue.

On February 18, 2026, together with 17 other MPs and senators, she announced her intention to leave Poland 2050 and to establish a new parliamentary club called The Centre.

== Electoral history ==
Election	Electoral Committee	Office	District	Result
2015	Modern	Sejm (8th term)	no. 37	7,306 (2.63%) ✓
2019	Civic Coalition	Sejm (9th term)	no. 37	16,813 (4.76%) ✓
2023	Third Way	Sejm (10th term)	no. 37	30,334 (7.24%) ✓
