= Anna Łukaszewska-Trzeciakowska =

Polish minister of climate and environment

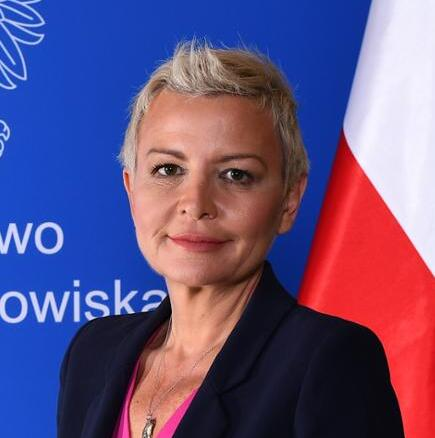

Minister of Climate and Environment
- In office 27 November 2023 – 13 December 2023
- President: Andrzej Duda
- Prime Minister: Mateusz Morawiecki
- Preceded by: Anna Moskwa
- Succeeded by: Paulina Hennig-Kloska

Personal details
- Born: 3 August 1974 (age 52) Warsaw, Poland

Anna Romana Łukaszewska-Trzeciakowska (born 3 August 1974 in Warsaw, Poland) is a Polish politician who served as Minister of Climate and Environment under Prime Minister Mateusz Morawiecki in his third cabinet from 27 November 2023 to 11 December 2023

Łukaszewska-Trzeciakowska served as Undersecretary of State in the same ministry, from 2022 to 2023. She had also served as Secretary of State and Government Plenipotentiary for Strategic Energy Infrastructure, a position she was appointed to on 2 June 2023.

== Career ==
Anna Łukaszewska-Trzeciakowska worked in the defence industry from 2002 to 2007 before focusing her work on the energy industry.
