= Polish Affairs =

Polish Affairs Polskie Sprawy
- Abbreviation: PS
- Leader: Agnieszka Ścigaj
- Founded: 28 April 2021
- Dissolved: 12 November 2023
- Split from: Kukiz'15; Law and Justice; Agreement
- Headquarters: ul. Wiejska 4; 00-902 Warsaw
- Ideology: Conservative liberalism
- Political position: Centre-right

Website
- polskiesprawy.org

Polish Affairs (Polish: Polskie Sprawy) was a Polish conservative liberal parliamentary group formed on 29 April 2021 by two opposition MPs and one ruling party MP. The leader of the circle was Agnieszka Ścigaj. Two former government representatives, Zbigniew Girzyński and Małgorzata Janowska joined Polish Affairs on 8 July 2021. However, the latter left the circle later that year. The circle ceased to exist after the 2023 Polish parliamentary election, as the only elected member Agnieszka Ścigaj chose to sit in the Law and Justice parliamentary club.

== Ideology ==
The circle did not present a larger set of unified ideologies, aside from being a moderate centre-right, conservative-liberal force.
