= Michał Woś =

Polish politician (born 1991)

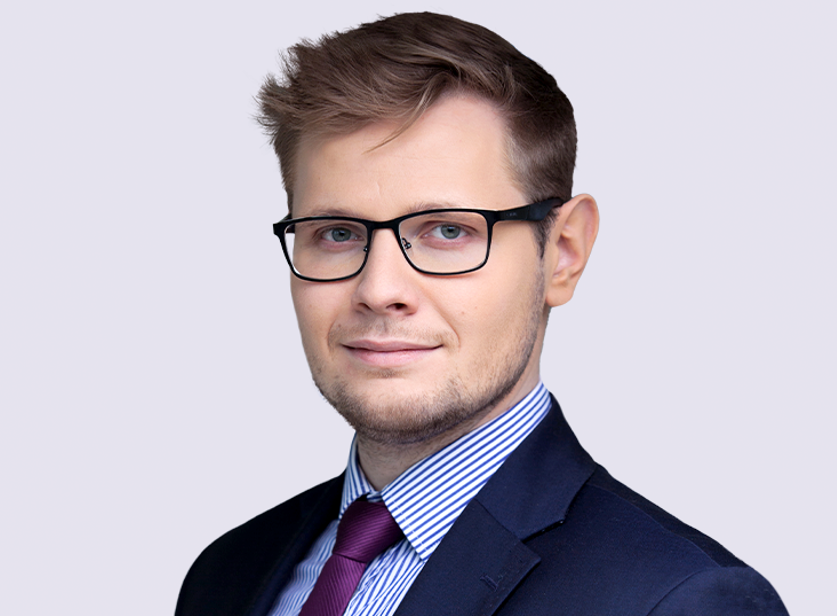
- Woś in 2021

Minister of Environment
- In office 5 March 2020 – 6 October 2020
- Prime Minister: Mateusz Morawiecki
- Preceded by: Michał Kurtyka
- Succeeded by: Michał Kurtyka

Member of the Sejm
- Incumbent
- Assumed office 13 November 2019
- Constituency: Rybnik

Personal details
- Born: 7 November 1991 (age 34)
- Party: Sovereign Poland

Michał Piotr Woś (born 7 November 1991) is a Polish politician of Sovereign Poland serving as a member of the Sejm. He was first elected in the 2019 parliamentary election, and was re-elected in 2023. He served as deputy minister of justice from 2017 to 2018, minister for humanitarian aid in 2019, minister without portfolio from 2019 to 2020, minister of environment in 2020, and secretary of state in the Ministry of Justice from 2020 to 2023.

In May 2020, as environment minister Wos announced that the Polish government was considering a law to require NGOs to disclose foreign funding, because "Poles have a right to know whether they are indeed organisations that work in the interests of Poles". The proposed law was criticized by the opposition; critics argued that the government was trying to suppress criticism.
