= Ministry of Climate and Environment (Poland) =

Government ministry of Poland

- Ministerstwo Klimatu i Środowiska

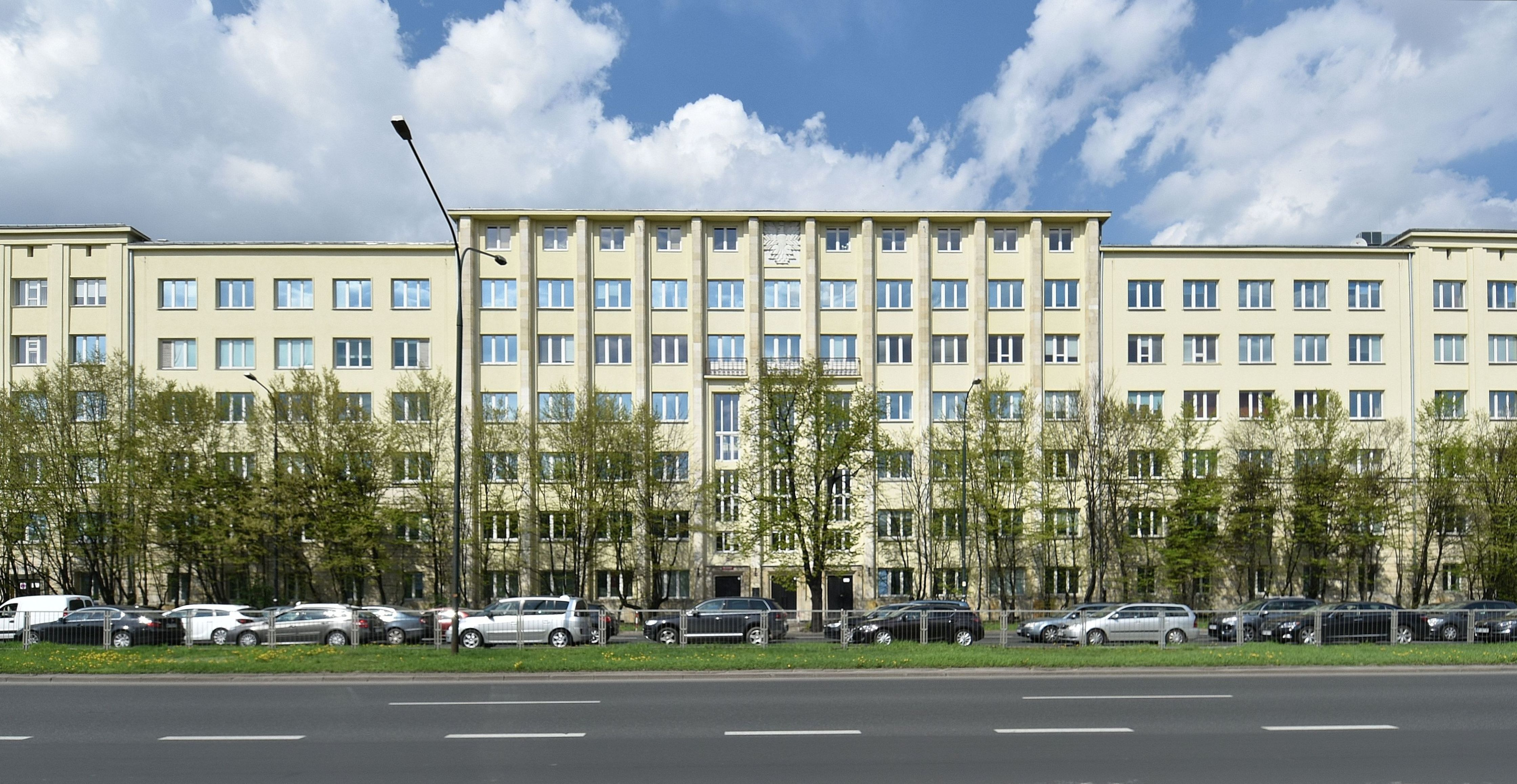
- Headquarters building in Ochota, Warsaw

Agency overview
- Formed: 6 October 2020 (6 years ago) (Note: The law establishing the ministry came into force on 7 October 2020, but retroactively set the ministry's date of establishment as 6 October 2020.)
- Preceding agencies: Ministry of Climate; Ministry of Environment; Ministry of Marine Economy and Inland Navigation
- Jurisdiction: Government of Poland
- Headquarters: Wawelska Street 52/54, Warsaw, Poland; 52.2170°N 20.9912°E
- Minister responsible: Paulina Hennig-Kloska, Minister of Climate and Environment
- Parent agency: Council of Ministers
- Website: gov.pl/web/climate

The Ministry of Climate and Environment (Polish: Ministerstwo Klimatu i Środowiska) is a ministry in the Polish government, established on 6 October 2020. It is headed by Paulina Hennig-Kloska, who has held the position of Minister of Climate and Environment since 13 December 2023. The ministry is also responsible for energy, forestry, and water management.

The ministry was created by merging the water management department of the Ministry of Marine Economy and Inland Navigation and the environment department of the Ministry of Environment into the former Ministry of Climate.

== List of ministers ==
Portrait	Name	Party	Term of Office		Prime minister ( Cabinet)
	Michał Kurtyka	Nonpartisanism	6 October 2020	25 October 2021	Mateusz Morawiecki (Morawiecki II)
	Anna Moskwa	Nonpartisanism	26 October 2021	27 November 2023	Mateusz Morawiecki (Morawiecki II)
	Anna Łukaszewska-Trzeciakowska	Nonpartisanism	27 November 2023	13 December 2023	Mateusz Morawiecki (Morawiecki III)
	Paulina Hennig-Kloska	Centre	13 December	Incumbent	Donald Tusk (Tusk III)
