= GreenEvo =

GreenEvo - Accelerator of Green Technologies is a project of the Poland’s Ministry of Environment aimed at international transfer of environmentally friendly technologies developed in Poland. Within the project, the best Polish companies are selected and awarded with promotional and financial support. There have already been 62 innovative Polish companies awarded, in such areas of technologies for wastewater and hazardous waste treatment and solutions that support the use of renewable energy sources, for example agricultural machinery for the manufacture of wood briquettes and solar panels.

GreenEvo — Green Technology Accelerator is organized by the Ministry of the Environment with other partners, namely: National Fund for Environmental Protection and Water Management, Ministry of Economy, Ministry of Foreign Affairs, Ministry of Science and Higher Education, Polish Agency for Enterprise Development, Polish Confederation of Private Employers ‘Lewiatan’, Faculty of Management, University of Warsaw. GreenEvo was nominated to the finals of the European Public Sector Award 2013.

In 2015, the 6th edition of GreenEvo was announced, with the main focus being technologies for waste management, especially supporting local level authorities.

== See also ==
- Ministry of Environment
- Green technology
