= Sejm Constituency no. 37 =

Polish parliamentary constituency

Konin
- Constituency for the Sejm
- Location of Konin within Poland
- Counties: Gniezno County; Koło County; Konin; Konin County; Słupca County; Środa County; Śrem County; Turek County; Września County
- Voivodeship: Greater Poland
- Population: 746,870 (2022)
- Electorate: 586,375 (2023)

Current Constituency
- Created: 2001
- Seats: 9
- Deputies: List: Waldemar Andzel (PiS); Mateusz Bochenek (PO-KO); Włodzimierz Czarzasty (The Left); Barbara Dolniak (PO-KO); Łukasz Litewka (The Left); Ewa Malik (PiS); Kamil Wnuk (Poland 2050); Katarzyna Stachowicz (PO-KO); Robert Warwas (PiS)
- Regional assembly: Greater Poland Voivodeship Sejmik
- Senate constituencies: 92 and 93
- EP constituency: 7 – Greater Poland

Konin, officially known as Constituency no. 37 (Polish: Okręg wyborczy nr 37), is one of the 41 constituencies of the Sejm, the lower house of the Parliament of Poland, the national legislature of Poland. The constituency was established in 2001, after a major redistricting process across Poland. It is located in the Greater Poland Voivodeship and includes the area of one city county: Konin as well as the counties of Gniezno, Koło, Konin, Słupca, Środa, Śrem, Turek and Września. The constituency's district electoral commission is located in Konin. The constituency currently elects 9 of the 460 members of the Sejm using the open party-list proportional representation electoral system. At the 2023 parliamentary election it had 586,375 citizens eligible to vote.

== List of deputies ==
Deputies for the 10th Sejm (2023–2027)
Deputy	Party	Parliamentary group
Michał Kołodziejczak	AGROunia	Civic Coalition
Tomasz Nowak	Civic Platform	Civic Coalition
Ryszard Bartosik	Law and Justice	United Right
Witold Czarnecki	Law and Justice	United Right
Zbigniew Dolata	Law and Justice	United Right
Zbigniew Hoffmann	Law and Justice	United Right
Michał Pyrzyk	Polish People's Party	Polish People's Party
Paulina Hennig-Kloska	Poland 2050	Poland 2050
Tadeusz Tomaszewski	The Left	New Left

== Election results ==
=== 2001 ===
2001 parliamentary election: Konin
Party	Votes	%	Seats
Democratic Left Alliance – Labour Union	124,226	48.07	5
Self-Defence of the Republic of Poland	35,556	13.76	2
Polish People's Party	29,278	11.33	1
Civic Platform	22,938	8.88	1
League of Polish Families	14,630	5.66	–
Solidarity of the Right Electoral Action	13,301	5.15	–
Law and Justice	12,359	4.78	–
Freedom Union	4,658	1.80	–
Alternative Social Movement	749	0.29	–
Polish Economic Union	444	0.17	–
Polish National Community	271	0.10	–
Total	258,410	100.00	9
Valid votes	258,410	94.04	
Invalid/blank votes	16,363	5.96	
Total votes	274,773	100.00	
Registered voters/turnout	574,616	47.82	
Source: National Electoral Commission

=== 2005 ===
2005 parliamentary election: Konin
Party	Votes	%	Seats
Self-Defence of the Republic of Poland	45,136	20.70	4
Law and Justice	42,936	19.69	4
Civic Platform	40,948	18.78	1
Democratic Left Alliance	28,503	13.07	–
Polish People's Party	22,210	10.19	–
League of Polish Families	13,681	6.28	–
Social Democracy of Poland	9,505	4.36	–
Liberty and Lawfulness	3,672	1.68	–
Democratic Party – demokraci.pl	3,525	1.62	–
Patriotic Movement	2,116	0.97	–
Ancestral Home	1,947	0.89	–
Polish Labour Party	1,753	0.80	–
All-Polish Civic Coalition	696	0.32	–
Polish Confederation – Dignity and Work	544	0.25	–
Polish National Party	520	0.24	–
National Rebirth of Poland	323	0.15	–
Total	218,015	100.00	9
Valid votes	218,015	95.40	
Invalid/blank votes	10,506	4.60	
Total votes	228,521	100.00	
Registered voters/turnout	597,149	38.27	
Source: National Electoral Commission

=== 2007 ===
2007 parliamentary election: Konin
Party	Votes	%	Seats
Civic Platform	101,722	34.18	5
Law and Justice	87,030	29.24	3
Left and Democrats	51,896	17.44	2
Polish People's Party	41,153	13.83	2
Self-Defence of the Republic of Poland	7,033	2.36	–
Polish Labour Party	4,704	1.58	–
League of Polish Families	4,107	1.38	–
Total	297,645	100.00	12
Valid votes	297,645	96.98	
Invalid/blank votes	9,255	3.02	
Total votes	306,900	100.00	
Registered voters/turnout	604,427	50.78	
Source: National Electoral Commission

=== 2011 ===
2011 parliamentary election: Konin
Party	Votes	%	Seats
Civic Platform	80,857	30.87	3
Law and Justice	71,795	27.41	3
Democratic Left Alliance	34,289	13.09	1
Polish People's Party	33,590	12.82	1
Palikot's Movement	29,236	11.16	1
Congress of the New Right	5,117	1.95	–
Poland Comes First	4,751	1.81	–
Polish Labour Party - August 80	1,242	0.47	–
Right Wing	1,043	0.40	–
Total	261,920	100.00	9
Valid votes	261,920	93.58	
Invalid/blank votes	17,973	6.42	
Total votes	279,893	100.00	
Registered voters/turnout	616,690	45.39	
Source: National Electoral Commission

=== 2015 ===
2015 parliamentary election: Konin
Party	Votes	%	Seats
Law and Justice	103,781	37.41	5
Civic Platform	56,111	20.23	2
United Left	32,649	11.77	–
Kukiz'15	24,486	8.83	1
Modern	19,237	6.94	1
Polish People's Party	19,027	6.86	–
KORWiN	11,061	3.99	–
Together	11,032	3.98	–
Total	277,384	100.00	9
Valid votes	277,384	96.35	
Invalid/blank votes	10,504	3.65	
Total votes	287,888	100.00	
Registered voters/turnout	617,224	46.64	
Source: National Electoral Commission

=== 2019 ===
2019 parliamentary election: Konin
Party	Votes	%	Seats
Law and Justice	166,965	47.29	5
Civic Coalition	72,295	20.48	2
The Left	53,090	15.04	1
Polish People's Party	34,620	9.81	1
Confederation Liberty and Independence	23,810	6.74	–
United Beyond Boundaries	2,261	0.64	–
Total	353,041	100.00	9
Valid votes	353,041	98.50	
Invalid/blank votes	5,375	1.50	
Total votes	358,416	100.00	
Registered voters/turnout	606,633	59.08	
Source: National Electoral Commission

=== 2023 ===
2023 parliamentary election: Konin
Party	Votes	%	Seats
Law and Justice	162,192	38.69	4
Civic Coalition	100,580	23.99	2
Third Way	69,740	16.63	2
The Left	39,761	9.48	1
Confederation Liberty and Independence	29,208	6.97	–
Nonpartisan Local Government Activists	9,851	2.35	–
There is One Poland	5,776	1.38	–
Prosperity and Peace Movement	2,135	0.51	–
Total	419,243	100.00	9
Valid votes	419,243	97.59	
Invalid/blank votes	10,359	2.41	
Total votes	429,602	100.00	
Registered voters/turnout	586,375	73.26	
Source: National Electoral Commission
