= Tomasz Nowak (politician) =

Polish politician (born 1956)

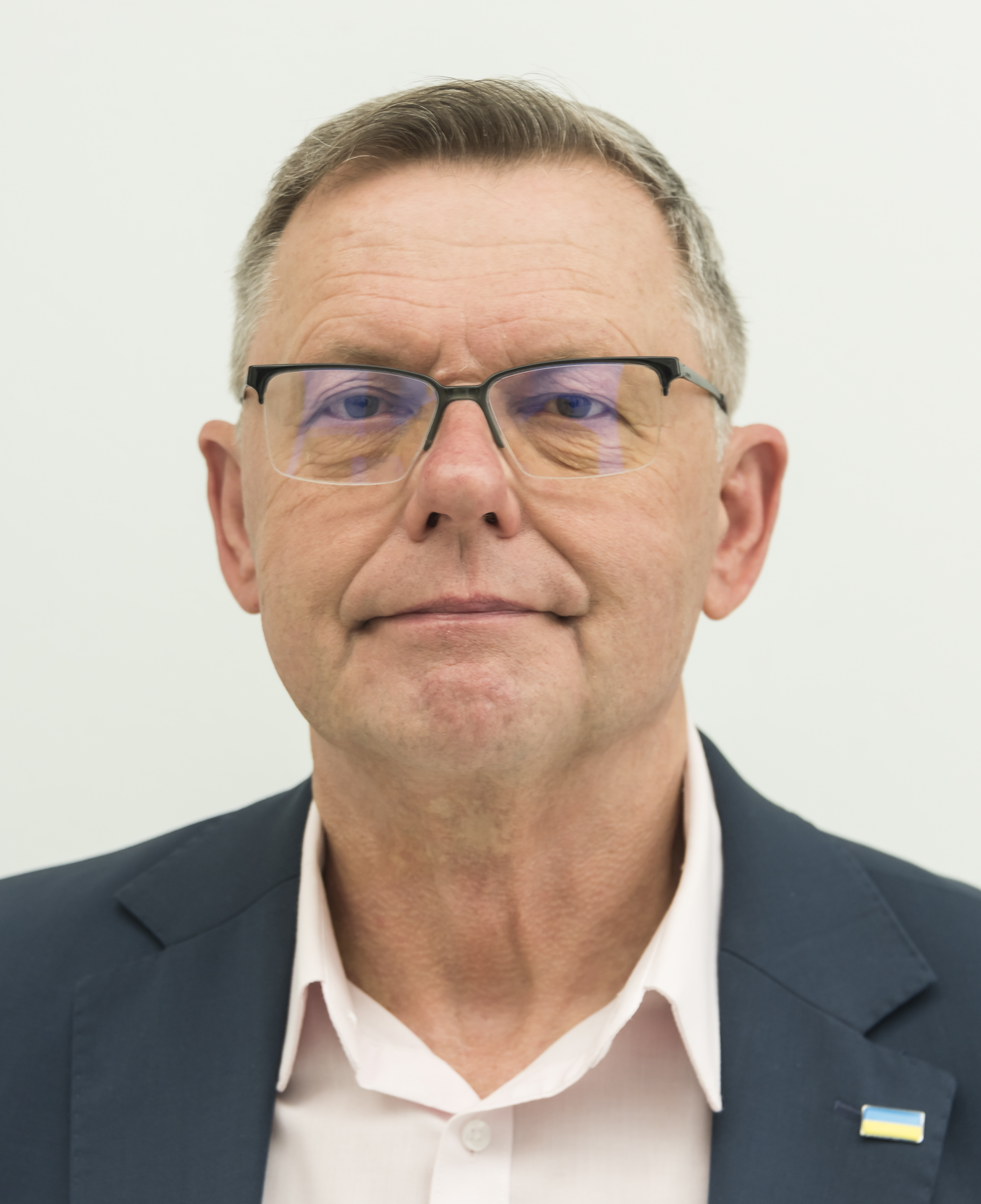
- Tomasz Nowak in 2022

Member of the Sejm
- Incumbent
- Assumed office 25 September 2005
- Term(s): 5th, 6th, 7th, 8th, 9th and 10th Sejm
- Parliamentary group: Civic Coalition
- Constituency: 37 (Konin)

Personal details
- Born: Tomasz Piotr Nowak; 22 December 1956 (age 69) Kwidzyn, Poland
- Party: Civic Platform
- Website: www.tomasz-nowak.pl

Tomasz Piotr Nowak (born 22 December 1956 in Kwidzyn) is a Polish politician, member of the Sejm since 2005.

Nowak joined Civic Platform party in 2001. He was first elected to the Sejm in the 2005 parliamentary election from the Sejm Constituency no. 37 with the biggest city being Konin. Nowak was reelected in 2007, 2011, 2015, 2019 and 2023. He is affiliated with the Civic Coalition parliamentary group.
