= Ministry of Infrastructure and Construction =

Former government ministry of Poland

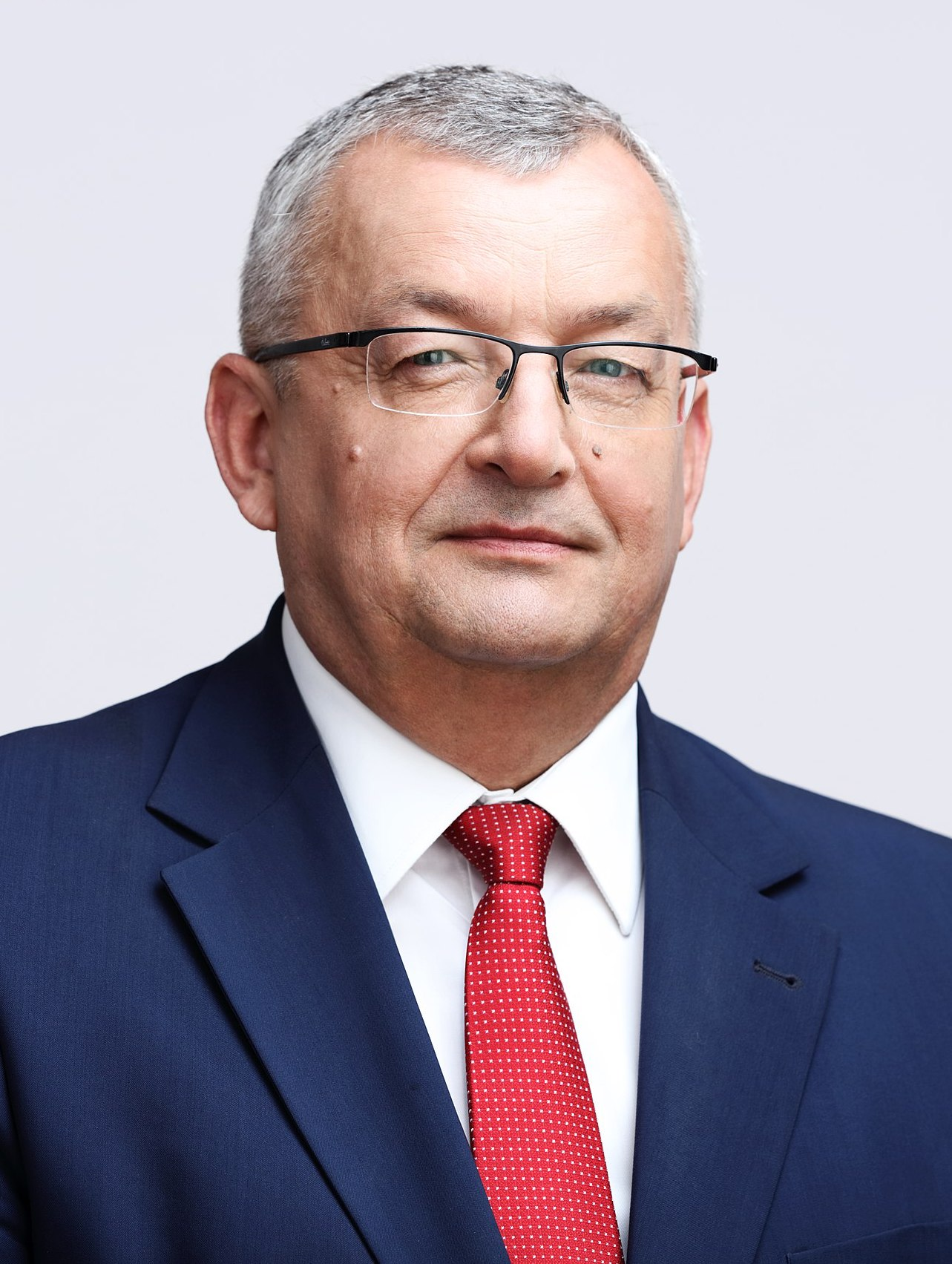
Andrzej Adamczyk

Ministry of Infrastructure and Construction (Polish: Ministerstwo Infrastruktury i Budownictwa) was the office of government in Poland responsible for construction and infrastructure. Andrzej Adamczyk was the only Minister of Infrastructure and Construction. It was created in late 2015 from the split of the Ministry of Infrastructure and Development, in 2018 became Ministry of Infrastructure.

== Headquarters ==
The building of the Ministry of Communication is a modernist office building at 4/6 Tytusa Chałubińskiego Street in Warsaw, erected between 1929 and 1931, designed by Rudolf Świerczyński.

In the years 1948–1950 the complex of buildings was significantly expanded according to the design of Bohdan Pniewski. The high-rise part can be considered as the first skyscraper built in Warsaw, and probably in the whole country after World War II.

In the period 1945–2000 the Polish State Railways were also managed from this building.
