= Anna Gembicka =

Polish politician (born 1991)

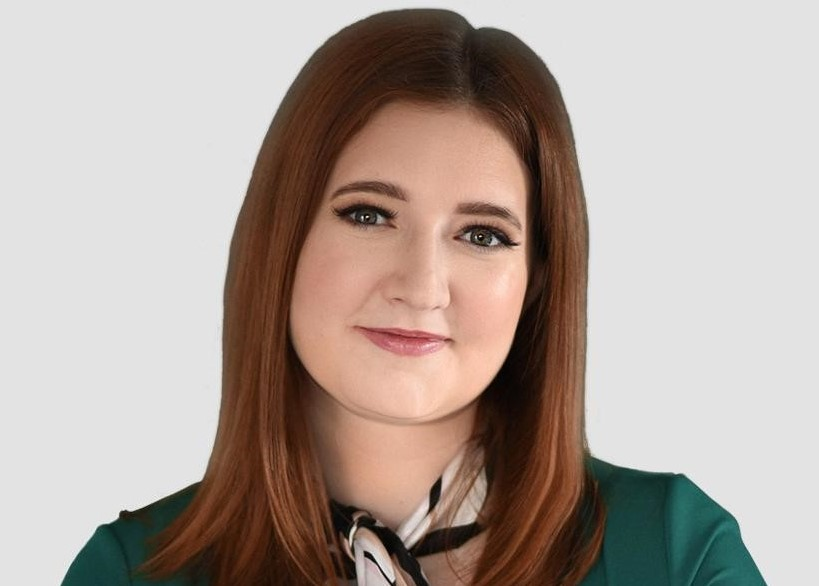
- Gembicka in 2021

Minister of Agriculture and Rural Development
- In office 27 November 2023 – 13 December 2023
- Prime Minister: Mateusz Morawiecki
- Preceded by: Robert Telus
- Succeeded by: Czesław Siekierski

Member of the Sejm
- Incumbent
- Assumed office 13 November 2019
- Constituency: Toruń

Personal details
- Born: 7 November 1991 (age 34)
- Party: Law and Justice

Anna Urszula Gembicka (born 7 November 1991) is a Polish politician of Law and Justice serving as a member of the Sejm. She was first elected in the 2019 parliamentary election, and was re-elected in 2023. In 2023, she served as Minister of Agriculture and Rural Development.
