= Robert Telus =

Polish politician (born 1969)

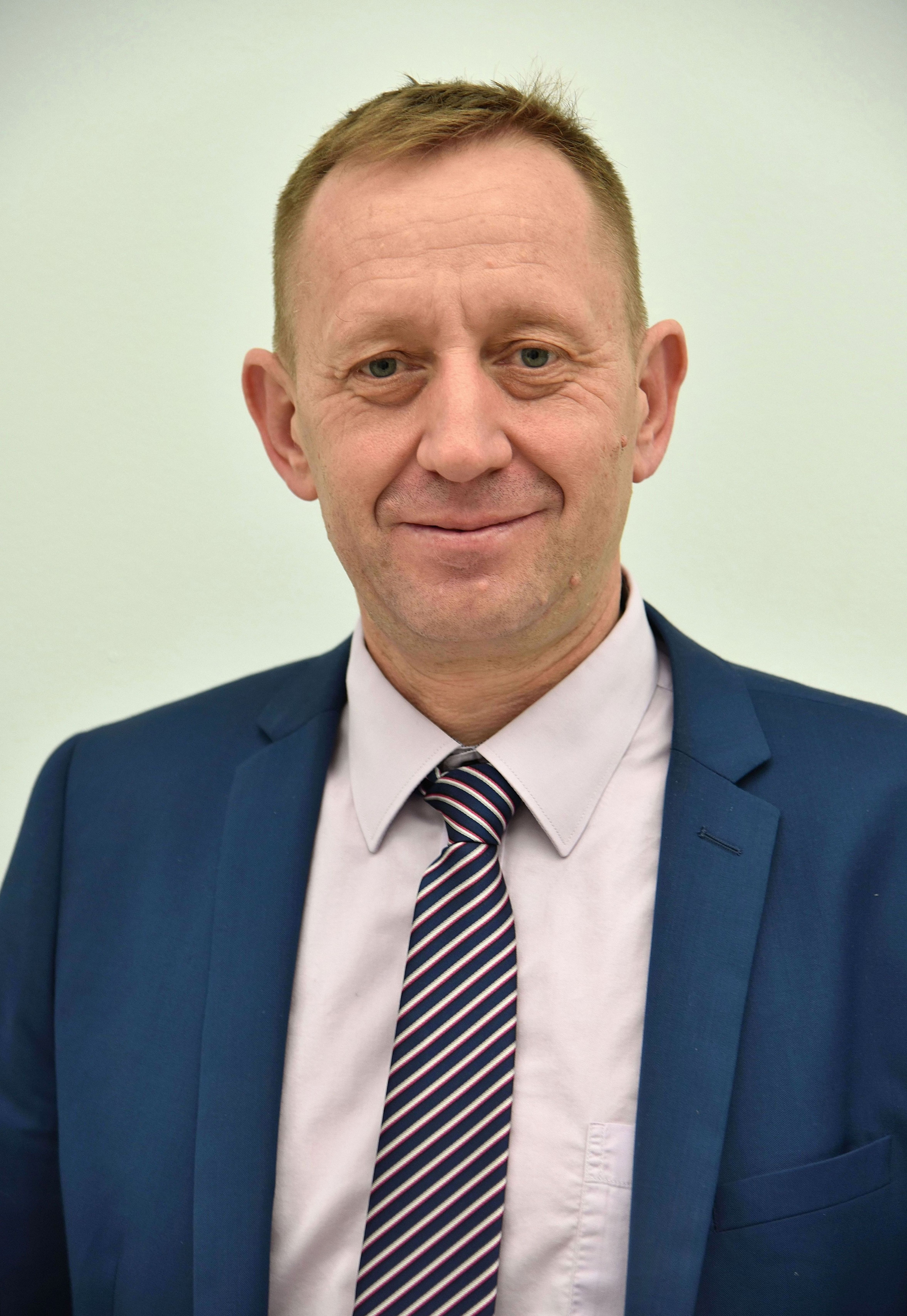
- Telus in 2016

Minister of Agriculture and Rural Development
- In office 6 April 2023 – 27 November 2023
- Prime Minister: Mateusz Morawiecki
- Preceded by: Henryk Kowalczyk
- Succeeded by: Anna Gembicka

Member of the Sejm
- Incumbent
- Assumed office 5 November 2007
- Constituency: Piotrków Trybunalski

Personal details
- Born: 18 April 1969 (age 56)
- Party: Law and Justice

Robert Telus (born 18 April 1969) is a Polish politician serving as a member of the Sejm since 2007. From April to November 2023, he served as minister of agriculture and rural development.
