= Jacek Ozdoba =

Polish politician (born 1991)

Jacek Ozdoba MEP
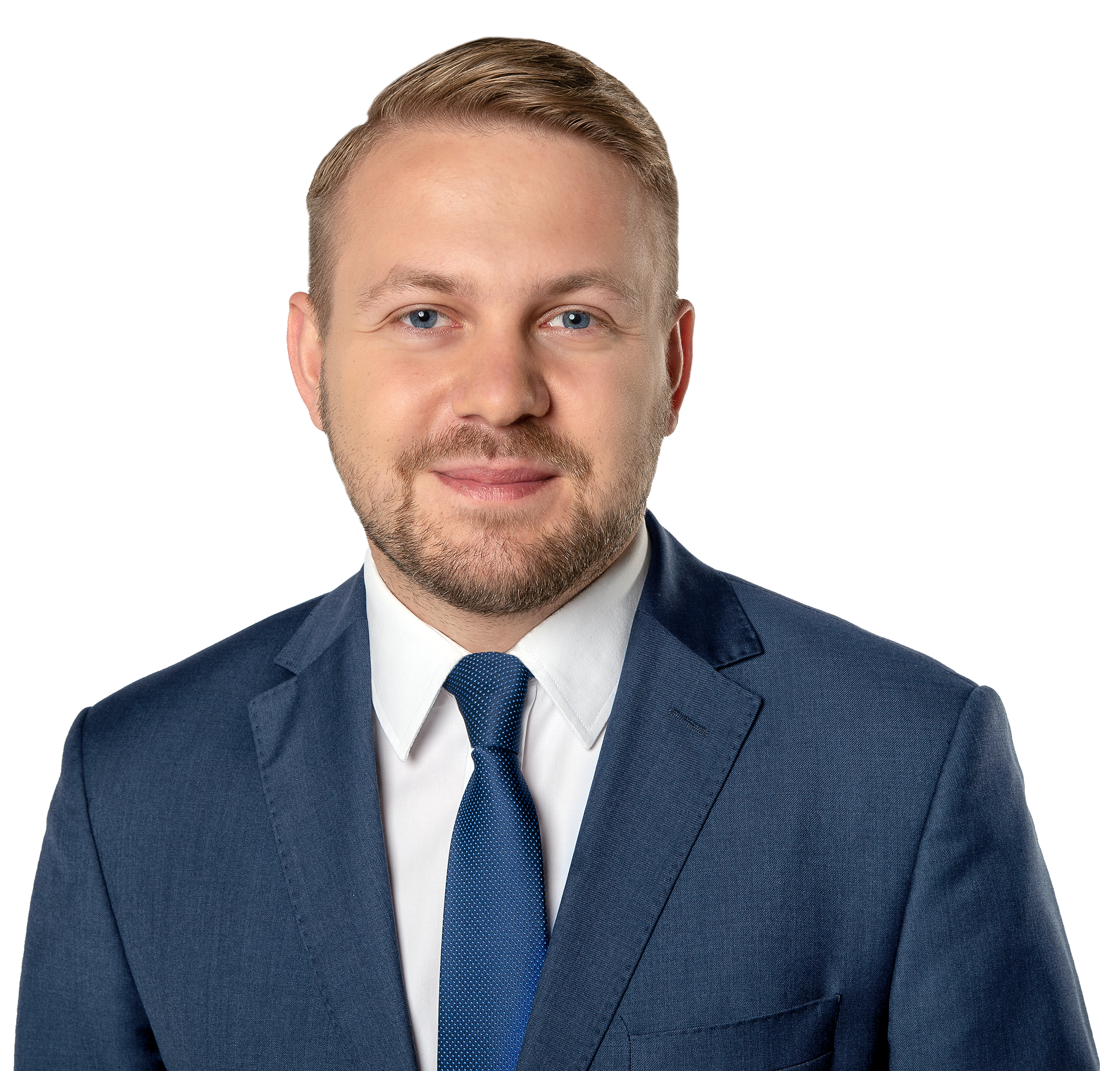
- Ozdoba in 2025

Member of the European Parliament
- Incumbent
- Assumed office 16 July 2024
- Constituency: Masovian

Member of the Sejm
- In office 12 November 2019 – 10 June 2024
- Constituency: Płock

Personal details
- Born: 22 September 1991 (age 34)
- Party: Law and Justice (since 2024); Sovereign Poland (2019–2024); Agreement (2017–2019); Poland Together (2014–2017)
- Other political affiliations: European Conservatives and Reformists Party

Jacek Ozdoba (born 22 September 1991) is a Polish politician, lawyer, civil servant, Warsaw councillor (2014–2019), member of the Sejm of the 9th and 10th terms (2020–2023), Secretary of State in the Ministry of the Environment and Climate, Member of the Council of Ministers since 2023, and Member of the10th term of the European Parliament since 2024.

== Early life ==
He graduated from the Faculty of Law and Administration of Cardinal Stefan Wyszyński University in Warsaw. He completed the Advanced Defence Course at the War Studies Academy. He was repeatedly listed by Dziennik Gazeta Prawna as one of the "50 Most Influential Lawyers in Poland."

== Career ==
From 2014 to 2019, he served in Warsaw's local government, first as a councillor for the Mokotów District (2014–2018) and subsequently as a councilor of the Capital City of Warsaw (2018–2019).

Between 2015 and 2018, he was an advisor to the Chancellery of the Prime Minister, and during the 2018 local elections, he served as press spokesman for the PiS candidate for Mayor of Warsaw.

In the 2019 parliamentary elections, he secured 17,873 votes, reaching 9th place—the third-best result on the United Right list in the Płock-Ciechanów district. He was re-elected in 2023 from 8th place, receiving 19,637 votes.

From 2020 to 2023, he served as Secretary of State in the Ministry of Climate and Environment.

He was the author of the first ever Polish complaint against another country regarding the violation of European Union law to the CJEU.

In 2024, he won a seat as a Member of the European Parliament from Mazowsze district, receiving 54,327 votes. He is the youngest member of the Polish delegation to the European Parliament. He serves on the Committee on the Environment, Public Health and Food Safety (ENVI) and the Committee on Civil Liberties, Justice and Home Affairs (LIBE).

== Controversies ==
=== Allegations of misconduct and "pig-snorting" incident ===
In February 2026, it was reported that Irish MEP Cynthia Ní Mhurchú had filed a formal complaint with European Parliament President Roberta Metsola regarding Ozdoba’s conduct during a committee meeting in December 2025. Ní Mhurchú alleged that while she was speaking to criticize Ozdoba’s views on Polish law and order, Ozdoba interrupted her by "snorting like a pig" and making "groaning and moaning" sounds.

Ní Mhurchú described the behavior as "base, vulgar, and crude," asserting that it was an insult to her as a woman and a member of the parliament. The incident also drew criticism toward the committee chair, Bogdan Rzońca, for failing to remove Ozdoba from the room; Ní Mhurchú suggested the lack of intervention created an atmosphere of "bias and misogynistic behaviour" as both men belong to the same political group. Ozdoba's actions were characterized in the complaint as obstructing the orderly running of the meeting and constituting "harassment-like behaviour."
