= Małgorzata Janowska =

Polish politician (born 1977)

Member of the Sejm

Personal details
- Born: 29 January 1977 (age 49)

Małgorzata Monika Janowska (born 29 January 1977) is a Polish politician. She was elected to the Sejm (9th term) representing the constituency of Piotrków Trybunalski. She previously also served in the 8th term of the Sejm (2015–2019).
