= Andrzej Adamczyk =

Polish politician (born 1959)

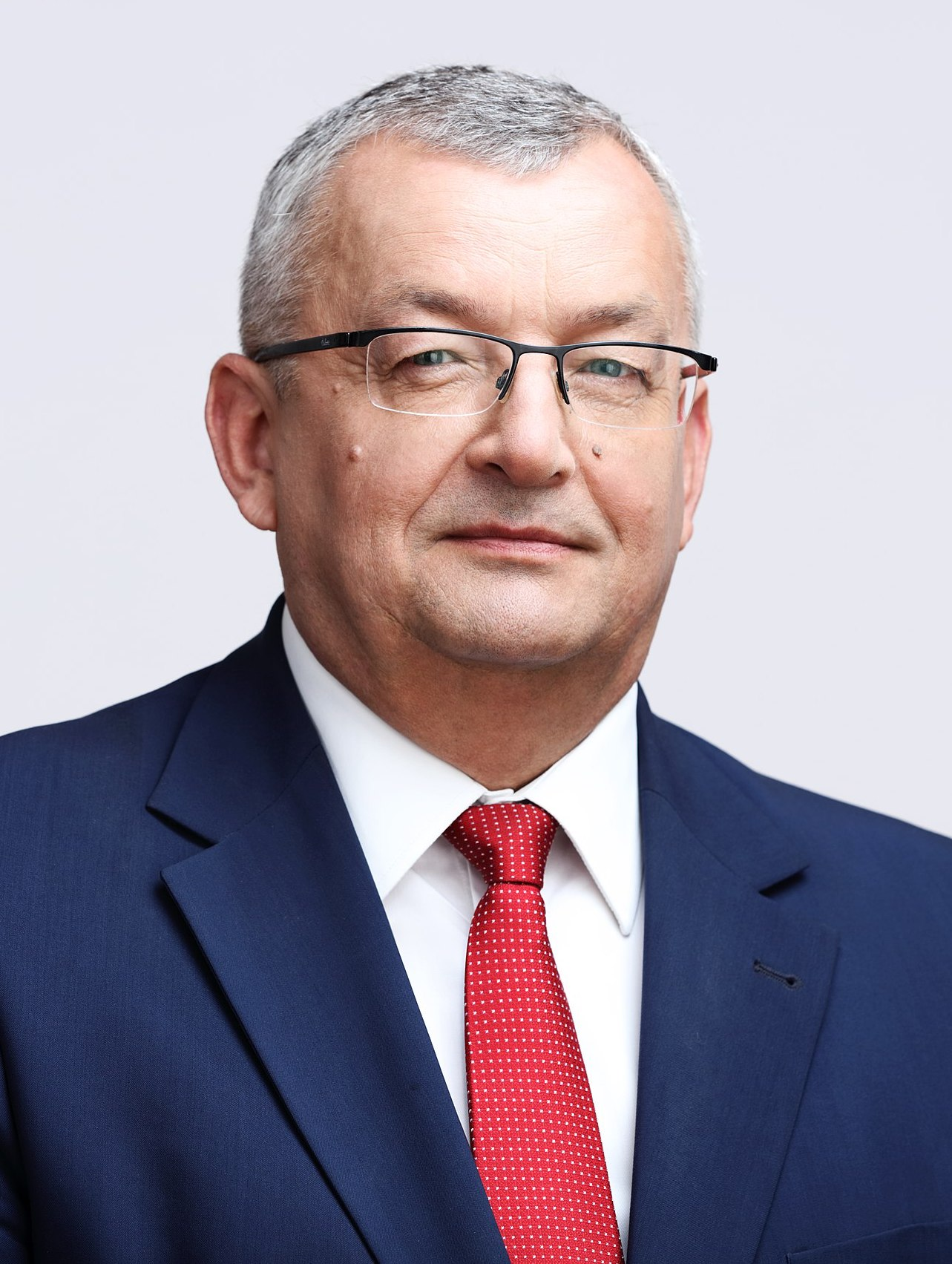

Minister of Infrastructure and Construction
- In office 16 November 2015 – 27 November 2023
- Prime Minister: Beata Szydło; Mateusz Morawiecki
- Preceded by: Maria Wasiak

Member of the Sejm
- Incumbent
- Assumed office 25 September 2005
- Constituency: 13 – Kraków

Personal details
- Born: 4 January 1959 (age 67) Krzeszowice
- Party: Law and Justice

Andrzej Mieczysław Adamczyk (born 4 January 1959) is a Polish politician, from 2015 to 2023, he held the office of the Minister of Infrastructure and Construction. He was elected to the Sejm on 25 September 2005, getting 1,582 votes in 13 Kraków district, as a candidate on the Law and Justice list.

== See also ==
- Members of Polish Sejm 2005-2007
