= Zbigniew Girzyński =

Polish politician (born 1973)

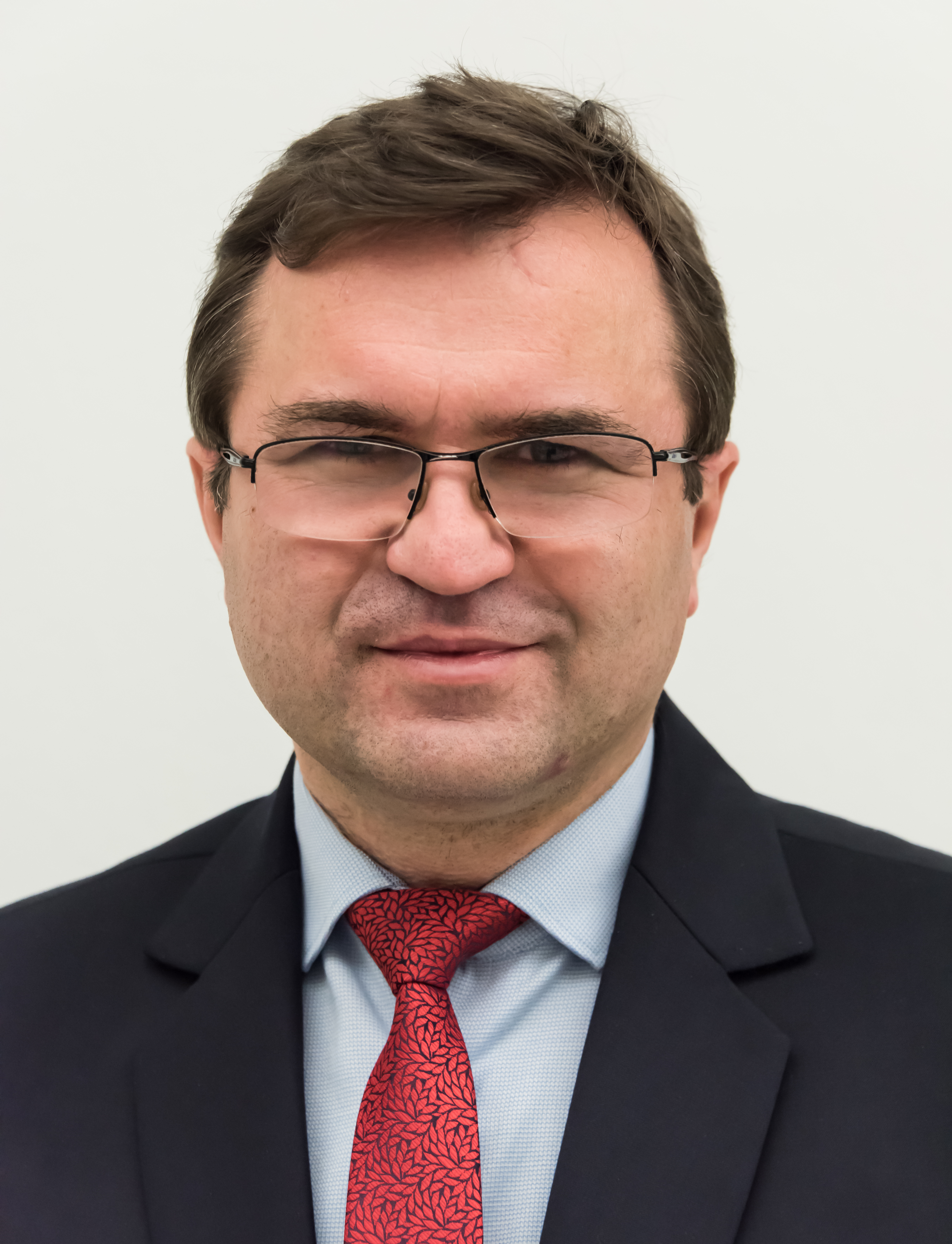

Member of the Sejm
- Incumbent
- Assumed office 25 September 2005
- Constituency: 5 – Toruń

Personal details
- Born: 17 March 1973 (age 53)
- Party: Law and Justice (2005—2022); The Future Is Coming 5.0 (2022–present)

Zbigniew Girzyński (born 17 March 1973 in Sierpc) is a Polish politician. He was elected to the Sejm on 25 September 2005, getting 8734 votes in 5 Toruń district as a candidate from the Law and Justice list.

In 2022, he left the Law and Justice party and formed a new party called The Future Is Coming 5.0.

== See also ==
- Members of Polish Sejm 2005-2007
