= Ministry of Environment (Poland) =

Government ministry of Poland

- Ministerstwo Środowiska
- Ministry of Environment logo

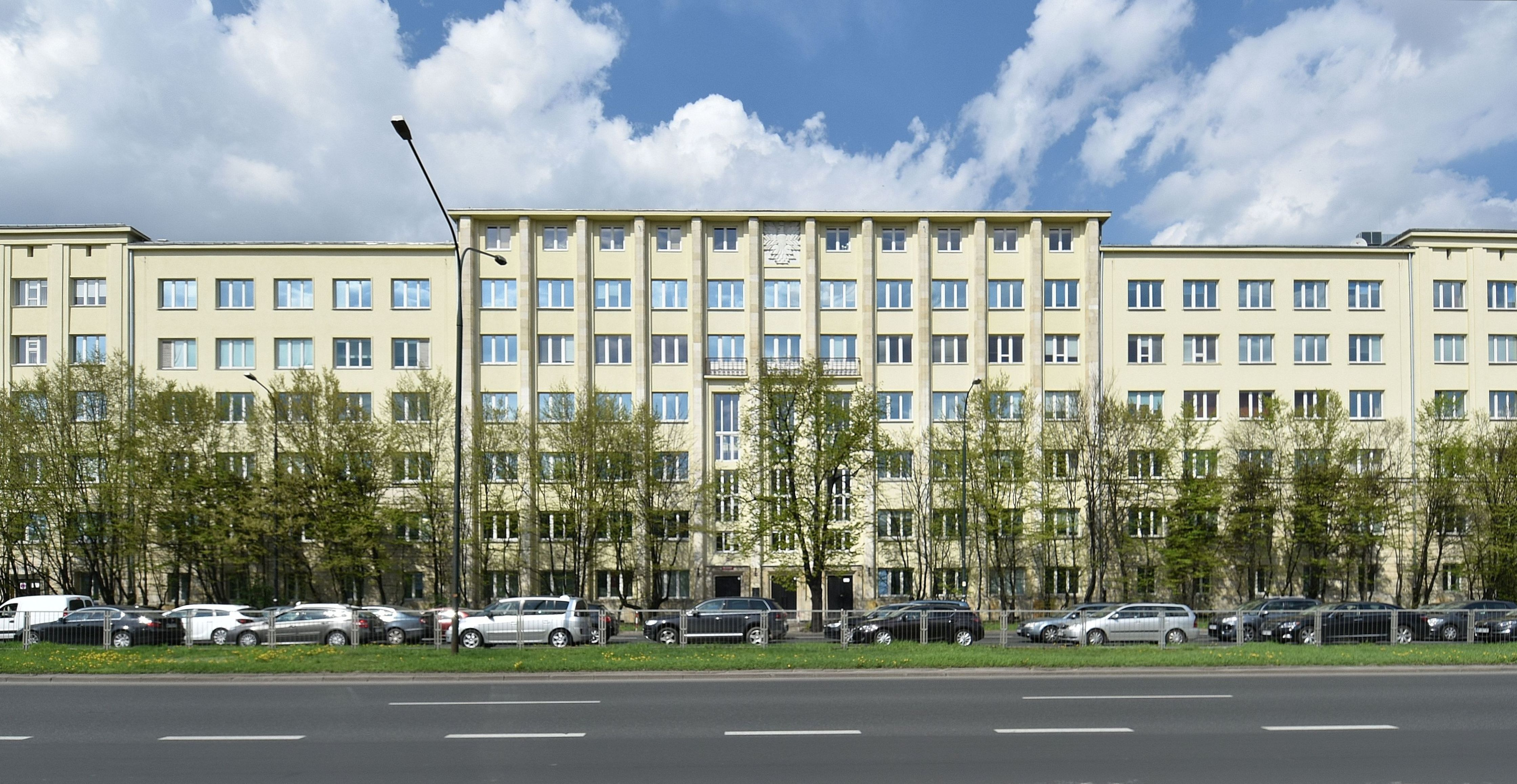

Agency overview
- Formed: 1972
- Headquarters: ul. Wawelska 52/54, Warsaw
- Agency executive: Michał Woś, Minister of Environment
- Parent agency: Council of Ministers
- Website: Ministry of Environment

Ministry of Environment of the Republic of Poland was formed in 1973 to administer issues related to environment protection of Poland.

The ministry existed under various names since 1972. It has assumed its current name in 1999.

The last Polish Minister of Environment was Michał Woś.

== See also ==
- GreenEvo Accelerator of Green Technologies
- Ministry of Climate (Poland)
