= Michał Kurtyka =

Polish economist and politician

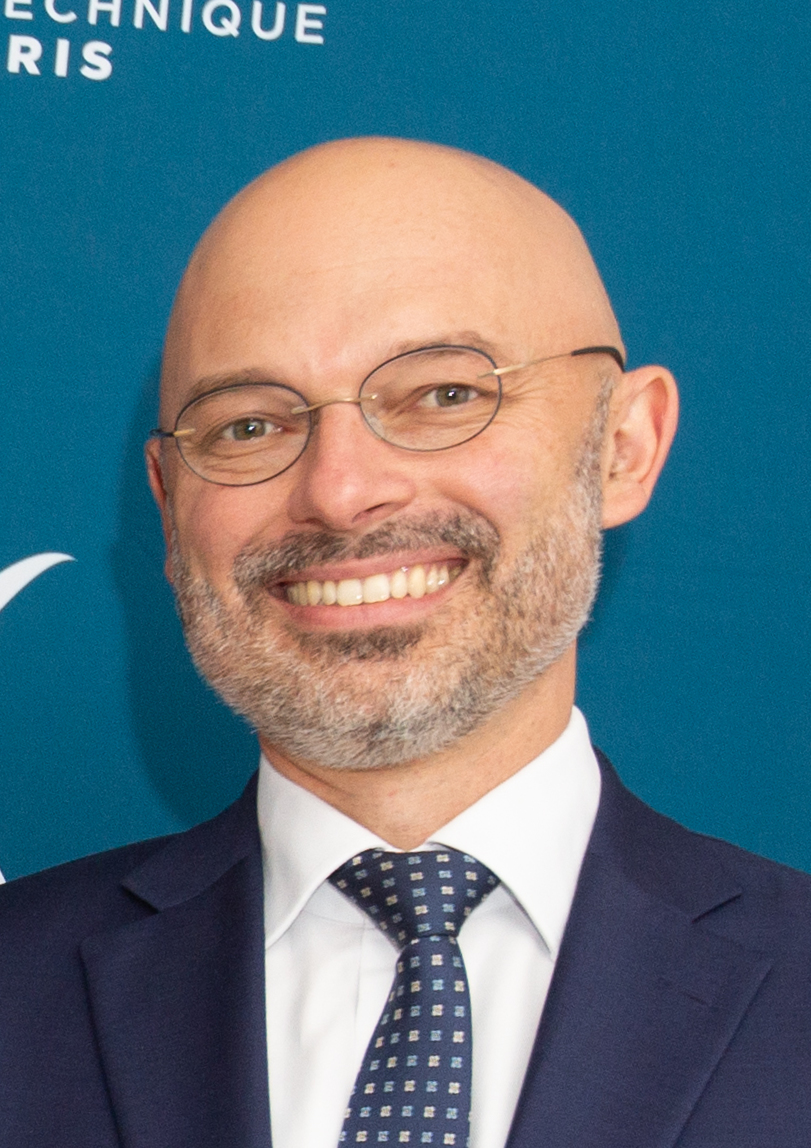

Secretary of State, Ministry of Energy
- President: Andrzej Duda
- Prime Minister: Mateusz Morawiecki

Personal details
- Born: Michał Tadeusz Kurtyka; 20 July 1973 (age 52) Kraków, Poland
- Education: Warsaw School of Economics; École Polytechnique; Université catholique de Louvain

Michał Tadeusz Kurtyka (born July 20, 1973) is a Polish manager, economist, and civil servant who served as the Minister of Climate and Environment until October 2021. He is a technocrat and a non-partisan figure.

Kurtyka served as President of the 2018 United Nations Climate Change Conference in Katowice. The Katowice Climate Change Conference enabled practical implementation of the 2015 Paris Agreement on climate change.

== Education and academic career ==
Kurtyka was educated at the Parisian École Polytechnique. He was also a scholar at the National Institute of Standards and Technology in Gaithersburg, Maryland, America, studying quantum optics. At NIST he worked under William D. Phillips, a Nobel laureate in physics. During his studies he also specialized in economics, with particular focus on market organization, studying under Professor Jean Tirole, the 2014 Nobel laureate in economics. In the field of international economics, he studied at the University of Louvain La Neuve in Belgium, and later obtained a master's degree in the subject at the Warsaw School of Economics. He defended his doctoral thesis at the University of Warsaw.

He was a lecturer in the field of economics, market organization, change management and industrial strategy at the University of Warsaw, the Collegium Civitas and the Oxford Programme On Modern Poland. He is the author of the book “From Restructuring to Modernisation. Delayed Transformation of the Polish Power Sector in 1990-2009.”, as well as the co-author of the concept of implementation of effective changes in an enterprise, described in the book “Change Management. From Strategy to Action”.

== Professional career ==
Kurtyka began his civil service career in 1998 as an official in the Office of the Committee for European Integration, then headed by Jan Kułakowski, in which capacity he worked on Poland's accession to the European Union as head of the analytical team.

He later oversaw the modernisation of Polish and international enterprises by providing them with advice with regard to the integration to European and global markets.

From 2006-2008 he was a member and vice-chairman of the supervisory board of Gaz-System, Poland's natural gas infrastructure organisation.

From 2016-2018, he served as the Undersecretary of State in the Ministry of Energy, before being promoted to Secretary of State. In the Ministry of Energy he was directly responsible for climate and energy policy implementation in the fuel and gas sector, technological development and innovations, as well as international relations with countries and international organisations. He also supervised the state’s participation in the biggest Polish oil and gas companies, such as PGNiG, Lotos and Orlen. He was the author of the Act on Electromobility and Alternative Fuels which enabled a progressive development of these forms of transport.

In July 2018, he was additionally appointed Secretary of State in the Polish Environment Ministry, complementing his Energy Ministry function.

On November 15, 2019, he was appointed the Minister of Climate.

On October 6, 2020, after the government’s reconstruction, he was appointed to the office of Minister of the newly established Ministry of Climate and Environment.

== International experience ==
Internationally, Michał Kurtyka chaired the works of the IEA in 2016-2017 when the Agency delivered the “Long Term Financial Health” reform which assured its sustainable financial security.

In April 2018, it was announced he would chair the 2018 United Nations Climate Change Conference, which was held in December 2018. The appointment of Kurtyka, as a relatively anonymous bureaucrat, marked a break from the diplomatic norms of previous climate change conferences, where more senior politicians have traditionally presided. The conference ended with the adoption of the Katowice Rulebook which enables the implementation of the Paris Agreement. At the conclusion of the summit Kurtyka noted: "putting together the Paris agreement work programme is a big responsibility. It has been a long road. We did our best to leave no-one behind".

In 2019, as the Chair of IEA Ministerial, Kurtyka led to the adoption of the first in ten years IEA Ministerial Communiqué.

On October 27, 2020, Michał Kurtyka was nominated as candidate for the position of OECD Secretary General.

== Personal life ==
In August 2020, Kurtyka became the second member of the Polish government who tested positive for SARS-CoV-2.
