= Małgorzata Jarosińska-Jedynak =

Polish politician (born 1979)

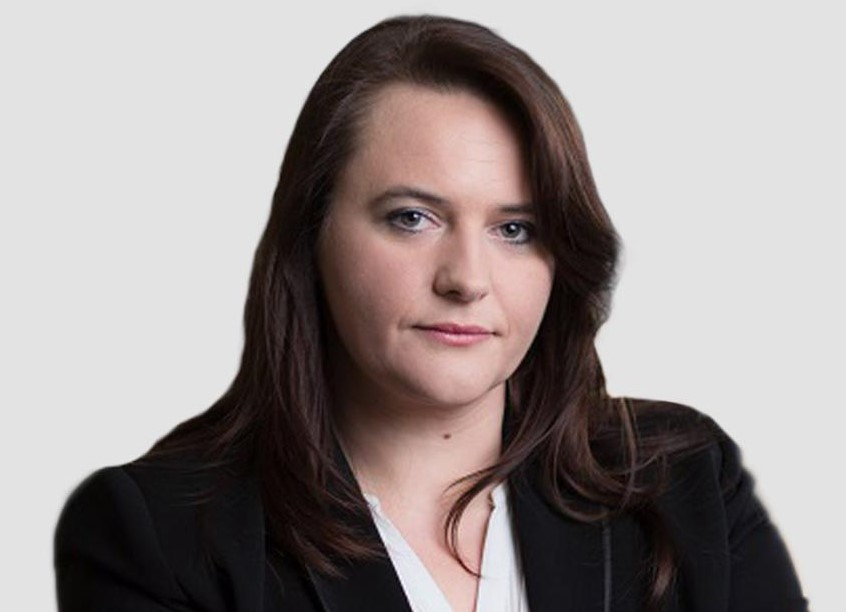

Minister of Funds and Regional Policy
- In office 15 November 2019 – 6 October 2020
- Preceded by: Office established
- Succeeded by: Tadeusz Kościński
- In office 27 November 2023 – 13 December 2023
- Preceded by: Grzegorz Puda
- Succeeded by: Katarzyna Pełczyńska-Nałęcz

Personal details
- Born: 31 October 1979 (age 46) Rzeszów, Polish People's Republic
- Party: Independent
- Education: Rzeszów University of Technology

Małgorzata Bogumiła Jarosińska-Jedynak (born 31 October 1979 in Rzeszów) is a Polish engineer and statesperson who served as Minister of Funds and Regional Policy from 2019 to 2020 in the Second cabinet of Mateusz Morawiecki and in November to December 2023 in the Third Cabinet of Mateusz Morawiecki, after a reorganisation and removal of many ministers, she served as a Secretary of State in the Ministry of Finance, Funds and Regional Policy from 2020 to 2023.

She also previously served as an Undersecretary in the Ministry of Investment and Economic Development in the years 2018 to 2019.

== Biography ==
She graduated in environmental engineering from the Faculty of Civil and Environmental Engineering of the Rzeszów University of Technology, as well as post-graduate studies in occupational safety and health at the same university.

She worked in local government administration, dealing with regional development and support for entrepreneurship, first at Tyczyn Commune, and then for 10 years at the Podkarpackie Province, rising to become director of the Department of Entrepreneurship Support.

On 29 November 2018 Prime Minister Mateusz Morawiecki appointed her Undersecretary of State in the Ministry of Investment and Development, responsible for the implementation of EU funds for innovation, digitization and human capital, as well as supervision of the "Accessibility Plus" program.

On 15 November 2019 she was appointed the Minister of Funds and Regional Policy in the Second cabinet of Mateusz Morawiecki being the first Minister of the newly established department. In 2020 under the reorganisation of the government departments the position of Minister of Funds and Regional Policy was given to at the time Minister of Finance Tadeusz Kościński which led to her losing her portfolio, she was instead appointed Secretary of State for the Ministry of Funds and Regional Policy an office she held till 2023.

She was then once again appointed Minister of Funds and Regional Policy on 27 November 2023 in the Third Cabinet of Mateusz Morawiecki a position which she held till 13 December 2023 when the government lost the vote of confidence in the Sejm.

== Honours ==
Country	Decoration	Date of issue
Poland	Knight's Cross of the Order of Polonia Restituta	26 June 2025
