= Jacek Rostowski =

Polish politician (born 1951)

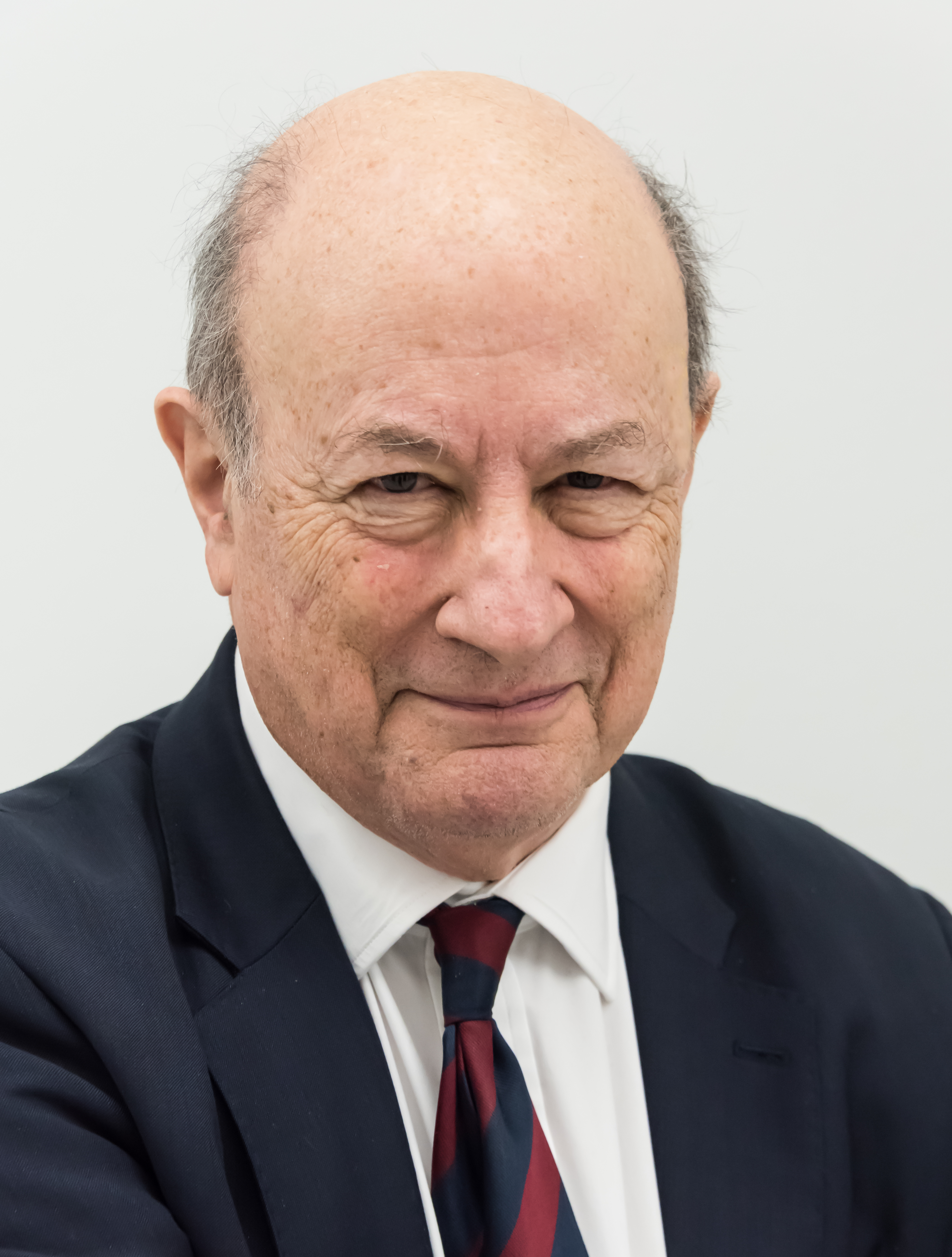
- Rostowski in 2020

Deputy Prime Minister of Poland
- In office 25 February 2013 – 27 November 2013
- President: Bronisław Komorowski
- Prime Minister: Donald Tusk
- Preceded by: Grzegorz Schetyna (2009)
- Succeeded by: Elżbieta Bieńkowska

Minister of Finance
- In office 16 November 2007 – 27 November 2013
- President: Lech Kaczyński; Bronisław Komorowski (Acting); Bogdan Borusewicz (Acting); Grzegorz Schetyna (Acting); Bronisław Komorowski
- Prime Minister: Donald Tusk
- Preceded by: Zyta Gilowska
- Succeeded by: Mateusz Szczurek

Personal details
- Born: 30 April 1951 (age 75) London, United Kingdom
- Party: Civic Platform; Change UK – The Independent Group (2019)
- Spouse: Wanda Rostowska
- Education: University College London; London School of Economics

Jan Anthony Vincent-Rostowski, also known as Jacek Rostowski (Polish pronunciation: [ˈjan ˈvint͡sɛnt rɔsˈtɔfskʲi]; born 30 April 1951, London), is a Polish-British economist and politician who served as Minister of Finance and Deputy Prime Minister of the Republic of Poland.

He was a candidate for Change UK in London at the 2019 European Parliament election in the United Kingdom.

== Early life and education ==
Jan Vincent-Rostowski was born into a Polish-Jewish exile family in London. During the Second World War his father, Roman Rostowski, served as personal Secretary to Tomasz Arciszewski, Prime Minister of the Polish government-in-exile and did not return to Poland after the war. In the 1950s, Roman Rostowski worked for the British Foreign and Commonwealth Office with postings to Kenya, Mauritius and the Seychelles where Jacek Rostowski spent much of his childhood. Jan's grandfather was Jakub Rothfeld (who left Judaism, changed his surname to Rostowski and regarded himself as a Pole), a professor of neurology at the John Casimir University in Lwów.

Jan Vincent-Rostowski attended Westminster School in London, followed by undergraduate and postgraduate studies at University College London (UCL) and the London School of Economics (LSE).

- 1972: Bachelor of Science – International Relations, University College London
- 1973: Master of Arts – Economy and History, University College London
- 1975: Master of Science – Economics, London School of Economics and Political Science

== Career ==
Jan Vincent-Rostowski was a lecturer at Kingston University (former Kingston Polytechnic), then from 1988 to 1995 at the UCL School of Slavonic and East European Studies, University of London. From 1992 to 1995, he also worked concurrently at the Centre for Economic Performance, LSE.

During this time, together with Ljubo Sirc, Vincent-Rostowski co-edited the academic journal, Communist Economies (later known as Communist Economies & Economic Transformation and Post-Communist Economies).

During the early 1980s, he was active (together with his wife Wanda Kościa) in the Polish Solidarity Campaign, a Solidarity support group based in London. From 1989 to 1991, during Poland's transition following the fall of communism, Vincent-Rostowski was an advisor to the Polish Deputy Prime Minister and Finance Minister, Leszek Balcerowicz.

In the early 1990s, Vincent-Rostowski also advised the Russian Federation on macroeconomic policy. In 1991, he co-founded the Warsaw-based Centre for Social and Economic Analysis (CASE), a think-tank designed to assist Europe’s newly independent nations during the transition to capitalism. He was also a member of the Foundation's Council (he resigned from this post when he was nominated as Minister of Finance).

Since 1995, he has been Professor of Economics and was the head of the Department of Economics at the Central European University in Budapest during the periods: 1995–2000 and 2005–2006.

From 1997 to 2000, Vincent-Rostowski was Chairman of the Macro-Economic Policy Council at the Polish Ministry of Finance.

From 2002 to 2004, he was an Economic Adviser to the National Bank of Poland.

In 2004, Vincent-Rostowski was appointed Economic Adviser to Bank Pekao. He left this post in November 2007.

=== Minister of Finance, 2007–2013 ===
Vincent-Rostowski joined the Cabinet of Premier Donald Tusk on 16 November 2007, and served as Minister of Finance of Poland until November 2013. He was named European Finance Minister of the Year in 2009 by The Banker magazine. In November 2012, Rostowski was cited by the Financial Times as the third best finance minister in Europe.

During his six-year tenure at the ministry, Rostowski oversaw an overhaul of the public finance sector, including a cap on spending growth and a decision to redeem sovereign bonds held by privately managed pension fund companies, a move that drew criticism from the fund companies and some economists. As part of a cabinet shuffle in late 2013, Tusk replaced Rostowski with Mateusz Szczurek.

=== Later career ===
Rostowski was a member of Britain's Conservative Party. In the beginning of 2010, it was announced that two months prior he has become member of the Civic Platform party (PO). In the wake of the Parliamentary Elections of 2011, he became Member of Parliament, being elected from the list of Civic Platform Party (PO).

In late 2015, Prime Minister Ewa Kopacz appointed Rostowski as her top political adviser.

In January 2025, he became acting head of the Permanent Representation of the Republic of Poland to the Organisation for Economic Co-operation and Development.

Vincent-Rostowski has published around 40 academic papers on European enlargement, monetary policy, currency policy and the transformation of post communist economies. He is the author of academic books including Macroeconomic Instability in Post-Communist Countries published by Oxford University Press.

== Political views ==
Rostowski is a believer in free markets, as well as a fiscal conservative. On social matters, he previously opposed in-vitro fertilisation, abortion and same-sex civil unions. In the run-up to the 2019 European Parliament election, he stated that his opinions on such matters have changed.

Rostowski supports Poland's joining the Eurozone, but in the wake of the European sovereign debt crisis, he advocates waiting until "the Euro has become safe to join".

Political offices
Preceded by Zyta Gilowska	Minister of Finance; 2007–2013	Succeeded by Mateusz Szczurek
