= Zyta Gilowska =

Polish economist, academic, and politician

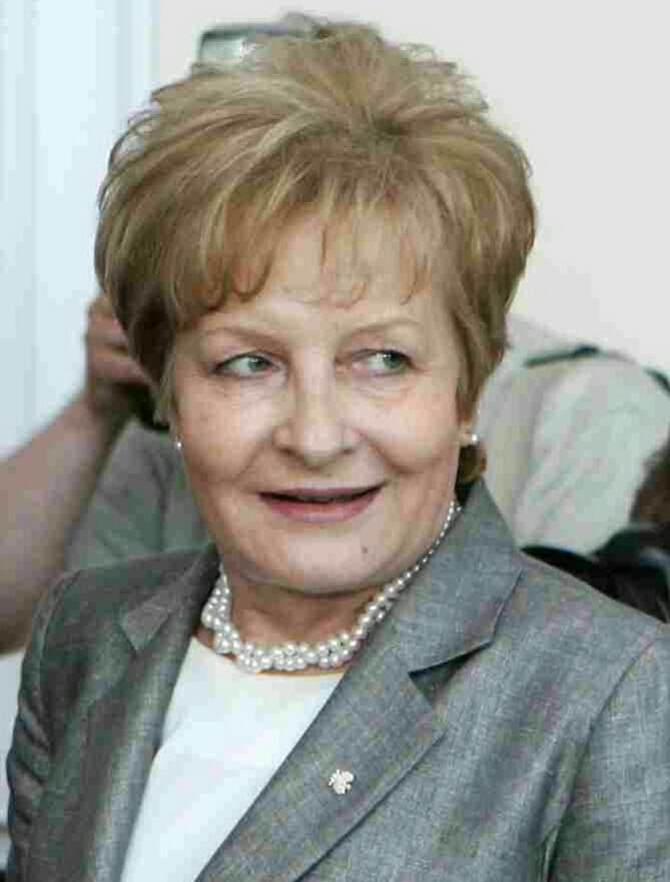

Minister of Finance
- In office 10 September 2007 – 16 November 2007
- Prime Minister: Jarosław Kaczyński
- Preceded by: Jarosław Kaczyński (Acting)
- Succeeded by: Jan Vincent-Rostowski
- In office 22 September 2006 – 7 September 2007
- Prime Minister: Jarosław Kaczyński
- Preceded by: Stanisław Kluza
- Succeeded by: Jarosław Kaczyński (Acting)
- In office 7 January 2006 – 24 June 2006
- Prime Minister: Kazimierz Marcinkiewicz
- Preceded by: Teresa Lubińska
- Succeeded by: Paweł Wojciechowski

Deputy Prime Minister
- In office 10 September 2007 – 16 November 2007
- Prime Minister: Jarosław Kaczyński
- Preceded by: Przemysław Gosiewski
- Succeeded by: Przemysław Gosiewski
- In office 22 September 2006 – 7 September 2007
- Prime Minister: Jarosław Kaczyński
- Preceded by: Roman Giertych
- Succeeded by: Przemysław Gosiewski
- In office 7 January 2006 – 24 June 2006
- Prime Minister: Kazimierz Marcinkiewicz
- Preceded by: Ludwik Dorn
- Succeeded by: Roman Giertych

Personal details
- Born: Zyta Janina Napolska; 7 July 1949 Nowe Miasto Lubawskie, Poland
- Died: 5 April 2016 (aged 66) Świdnik, Poland
- Party: Freedom Union; Civic Platform
- Education: Warsaw University; Maria Curie-Sklodowska University

Zyta Janina Gilowska (Note: [ˈzɨta gʲiˈlɔfska]) (née Napolska; 7 July 1949 – 5 April 2016) was a Polish economist, academic, and politician.

== Early life and education ==
Gilowska was born in Nowe Miasto Lubawskie on 7 July 1949. In 1972, she graduated with a degree in economics from Warsaw University. In 1981, she received her PhD in economics from Maria Curie-Sklodowska University in Lublin.

== Career ==
From 1972 to 1985, Gilowska was a research assistant at Maria Curie-Sklodowska University and later at the same institute, become an associate professor from 1995 to 1999. In 2001, she became full professor at the Catholic University of Lublin. From 1994 to 1996, she was a member of the liberal party, Freedom Union (Unia Wolności). She was the former vice chairman of the Civic Platform (Polish: Platforma Obywatelska) party; however, she left the party on 21 May 2005 in protest over accusations by party colleagues of wrongdoing. From 2001 to 2005, she was a Sejm (the lower chamber of the Polish Parliament) deputy.

From 7 January to 23 June 2006, she was the deputy prime minister and finance minister in the Law and Justice government under Kazimierz Marcinkiewicz. She was dismissed due to allegations about her communist-era collaboration. Paweł Wojciechowski replaced her as finance minister.

From 22 September 2006 to 16 November 2007, she again was deputy prime minister and finance minister. In October 2006, Gilowska was made the head of Poland's financial supervisory authority and the European Investment Bank governor of Poland.

She resigned from parliament in 2008 due to health issues, and largely withdrew from political activity. Between February 2010 and October 2013, she was a member of the Monetary Policy Council, and in October 2015, President Andrzej Duda appointed her to the National Development Council.

== Personal life ==
She was married to Andrzej Gilowski, with whom she had a son, Paweł. A lifetime heavy smoker, she battled heart failure since her youth, dying of the disease on 5 April 2016, aged 66, in Świdnik.

Political offices
Preceded by Stanisław Kluza	Minister of Finance; 2006–2007	Succeeded by Jacek Rostowski
