= Szczurek =

Szczurek is a Polish surname meaning "little rat". Notable people with the surname include:

- Łukasz Szczurek (born 1988), Polish biathlete
- Mateusz Szczurek (born 1975), Polish economist and politician
- Wojciech Szczurek (born 1963), Polish politician
