= Grzegorz Puda =

Polish politician (born 1982)

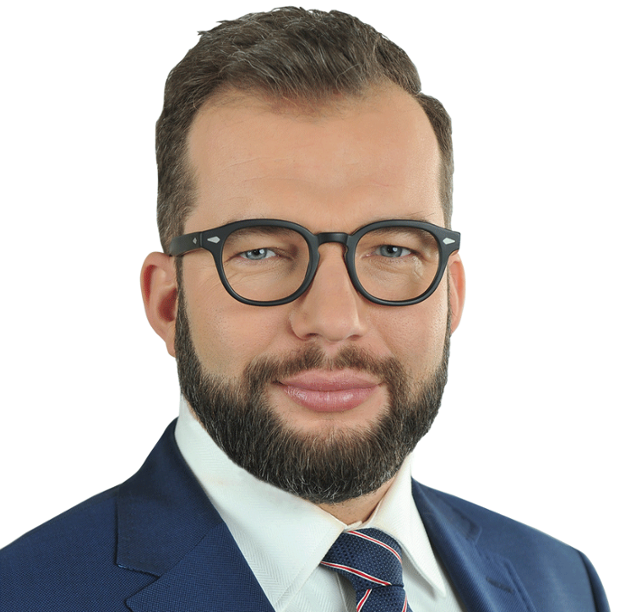
- Puda in 2019

Minister of Funds and Regional Policy
- In office 26 November 2021 – 27 November 2023
- Preceded by: Tadeusz Kościński
- Succeeded by: Małgorzata Jarosińska-Jedynak

Minister of Agriculture and Rural Development
- In office 6 October 2020 - 26 October 2021
- Preceded by: Jan Krzysztof Ardanowski
- Succeeded by: Henryk Kowalczyk

Personal details
- Born: Grzegorz Paweł Puda; 13 July 1982 (age 43); Bielsko-Biała, Poland
- Political party: Law and Justice

Grzegorz Paweł Puda (born 13 July 1982) is a Polish politician and local government official, member of the Sejm of the 8th and 9th term (since 2015), in 2019 secretary of state at the Ministry of Investment and Development, 2019–2020 Secretary of State in the Ministry of Funds and Regional Policy, from 2020 Minister of Agriculture and Rural Development in the second government of Mateusz Morawiecki.

== Curriculum vitae ==
In 2006, he obtained the professional title of Master of Engineering in Animal Science at the Agricultural University of Kraków. He worked, among others as a marketing manager in a private enterprise and a coordinator in the district office.

He became involved in political activities within the Law and Justice party. In 2006, 2010 and 2014, he was a city councilor in Bielsko-Biała. In the general elections in 2015, he ran for the Sejm from the eighth place on the PiS list in the Bielsko district. He was elected deputy of the 8th term of office, receiving 12,262 votes.

In July 2019, he was appointed by Prime Minister Mateusz Morawiecki as the secretary of state at the Ministry of Investment and Development. In the general elections in 2019, he successfully ran for re-election, obtaining 23,907 votes. In November 2019, after transformations in the structure of ministries, he moved to the position of the secretary of state in the Ministry of Funds and Regional Policy.

In January 2020, he became the government plenipotentiary for the organization of the World City Forum in 2022.

On 6 October 2020 he was appointed the Minister of Agriculture and Rural Development in the office of Prime Minister Mateusz Morawiecki. He replaced Jan Krzysztof Ardanowski in this function.
