= Stanisław Kluza =

Polish economist and politician

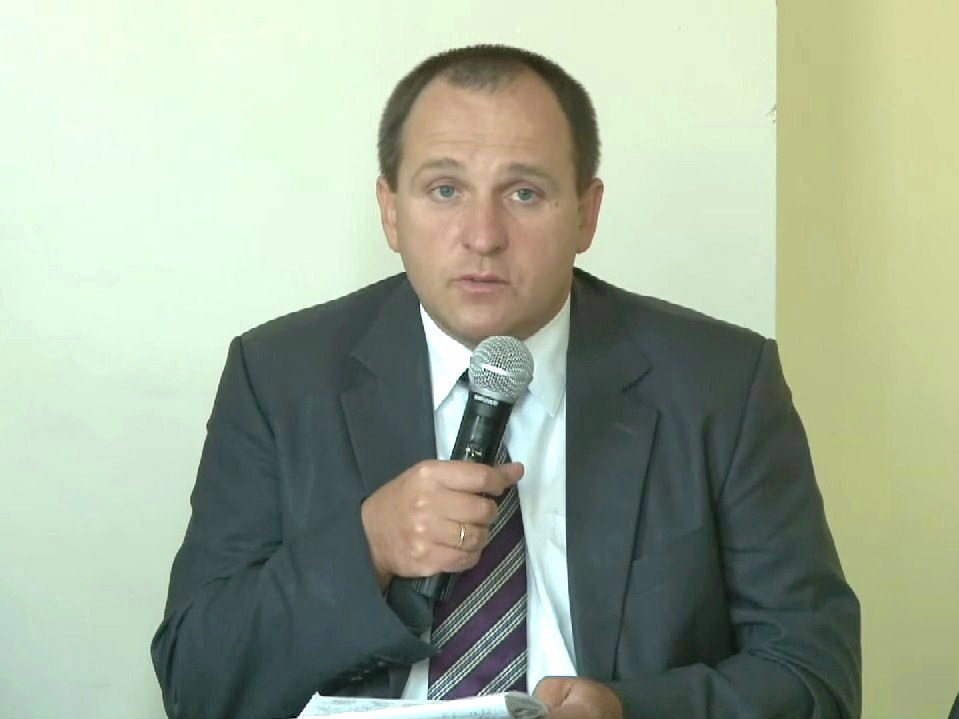
Stanisław Kluza

Stanisław Kluza (Note: [sta'ɲiswaf 'kluza]) (born 2 June 1972 in Warsaw) is a Polish economist who, from 14 July to 22 September 2006, was the Finance Minister in the cabinet of Jarosław Kaczyński. He is the successor of Paweł Wojciechowski, who lasted only two weeks in this position as a man personally unknown to the Law and Justice party leader. Kluza claimed to continue the financial politics of Zyta Gilowska and Wojciechowski. Advocate of support for numerous families in their income tax, he is against lowering taxes until 2009 and calls for reform of the euro zone enlargement procedures to new member countries.

Kluza was the founder and first President of the Polish Financial Supervision Authority (September 2006 - November 2011).

He is a member of the Economic Shadow Cabinet of Business Centre Club in Poland, responsible for the financial sector stability and development issues. He is a member of the ProEuro Initiative supporting adoption of the euro in Poland together with: Danuta Hübner, Dimitris Dimitriadis, Władysław Bartoszewski, ks. Adam Boniecki, Jerzy Buzek, Marek Goliszewski, Dariusz Rosati. (http://www.bcc.org.pl/uploads/media/2013.02.26_BCC_podtrzymuje_stanowisko_Koalicji_Pro-Euro_w_sprawie_wejscia_do_strefy_euro.pdf). He supports efforts to create the Banking Union and Poland's participation. Though, he is a supporter of concern for equality in relationships between the home and host countries (bibliography: http://www.natolin.edu.pl/pdf/analizy/Natolin_Analiza_2_2014.pdf).

Faculty member in the Institute of Statistics and Demography at the Warsaw School of Economics (SGH) since 1994. Research Interests : Financial supervision, Monetary policy, Econometrics, Statistics, Macroeconomic analysis, Banking, Business cycle, Demographic policy.

Awards and prizes: 1995 – Top Ten Award (Warsaw School of Economics, during master studies); 1998 – Foundation for Polish Science Award; 1999-2000 – Fulbright Fellowship (Washington University in St. Louis, US); 2001 – Dekaban-Liddle Fellowship (University of Glasgow, Scotland); 2002 – Award from the Prime Minister of Poland for the Ph.D. Dissertation; 2007 – “Finansista roku 2007”- Financier of the year by Gazeta Finansowa Weekly in Poland; 2008 – “Top Manager” of Manager Magazine in Poland; 2011 – “Medal Europejski” - European Award of Business Centre Club in Poland.
