= Paweł Szałamacha =

Polish politician (born 1969)

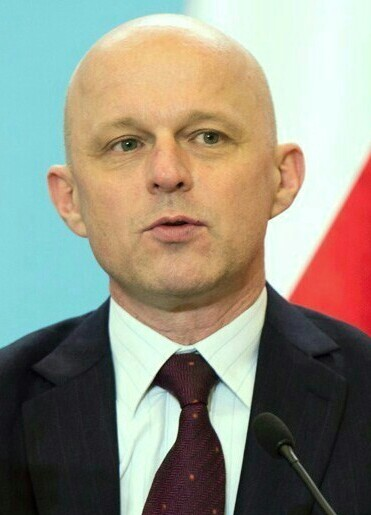

Minister of Finance
- In office 16 November 2015 – 28 September 2016
- Prime Minister: Beata Szydło
- Preceded by: Mateusz Szczurek
- Succeeded by: Mateusz Morawiecki

Management Board Member of the National Bank of Poland
- Incumbent
- Assumed office 6 October 2016

Personal details
- Born: 24 January 1969 (age 57) Gorzów Wielkopolski, Poland
- Party: Law and Justice
- Education: Adam Mickiewicz University; College of Europe; Harvard University

Paweł Włodzimierz Szałamacha (born 24 January 1969, in Gorzów Wielkopolski, Poland) is a Polish politician, member of the National Bank of Poland Management Board, and a former Minister of Finance.

He was a deputy minister at the Ministry of State Treasury in the years 2005–2007, and a member of the Sejm in the years 2011– 2015. Szałamacha was the Minister of Finance, in office 16 November 2015 to 28 September 2016. He graduated from the Faculty of Law and Administration of Adam Mickiewicz University in Poznań, received a Master of Laws in European Union law from the College of Europe and a mid-career Master of Public Administration from the John F. Kennedy School of Government at Harvard University.

Political offices
Preceded by Mateusz Szczurek	Minister of Finance; 2015–2016	Succeeded by Mateusz Morawiecki
