= Marian Januszajtis-Żegota =

Polish military commander and politician

Marian Józef Żegota-Januszajtis
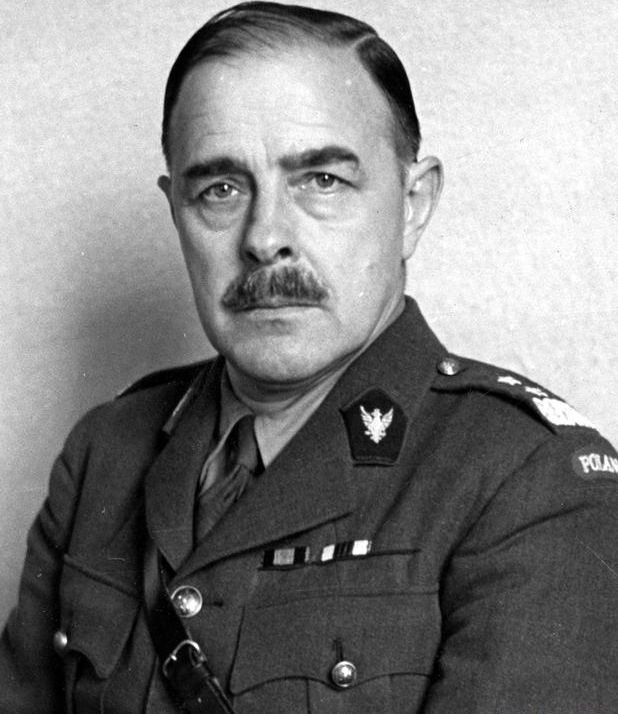
- Born: April 3, 1889; Częstochowa, Piotrków Governorate
- Died: March 24, 1973 (aged 83); Royal Tunbridge Wells, England
- Military career
- Rank: Major general
- Commands: 1st Brigade of Polish Legions
- Conflicts: World War I Polish-Soviet War; World War II
- Awards: Virtuti Militari; Polonia Restituta; Cross of Independence; Cross of Valour; Golden Cross of Merit; Order of the Iron Crown; Legion of Honour

Marian Józef Żegota-Januszajtis (3 April 1889, Częstochowa, Piotrków Governorate - 24 March 1973, Royal Tunbridge Wells) was a Polish military commander and politician. He was one of the founders of Polish paramilitary pro-independence organizations in the Austrian partition, and the last commander of the 1st Brigade of Polish Legions.

He was also the organizer of unsuccessful coup in 1919, general in the Second Polish Republic and Polish Armed Forces in the West, voivode of the Nowogródek Voivodeship (1924-1926), and member of the National Council of Poland.

Following the Soviet invasion of Poland he founded the Organization for the Struggle for Freedom in Lwów. He was arrested by NKVD on 27 October 1939 and imprisoned in Lwów and then in Moscow Lubyanka prison. After the Sikorski-Mayski Agreement of July 1941, he was released. After the war, he remained in exile in the United Kingdom, where he died in March 1973 and was buried in Crawley cemetery next to his wife. In November 1981, his ashes were brought to Poland – resting in the New Cemetery in Zakopane, in legionnaires' quarters.

The surname Januszajtis is of Lithuanian origin, the Lithuanian name being Janušaitis.

== Honours and awards ==
- Silver Cross of the Order of Virtuti Militari (1921)
- Commander's Cross of the Order of Polonia Restituta
- Cross of Independence
- Cross of Valour (four times)
- Officer's badge "Parasol"
- Knight's Cross of the Legion of Honour (France)

== Promotions ==
- Captain - September 1914
- Major - November 1914
- Lieutenant Colonel - March 1915
- Colonel - November 1915
- Brigadier General - 28 February 1921
- Major General - 1 December 1924
