= Tadeusz Kościński =

Polish politician

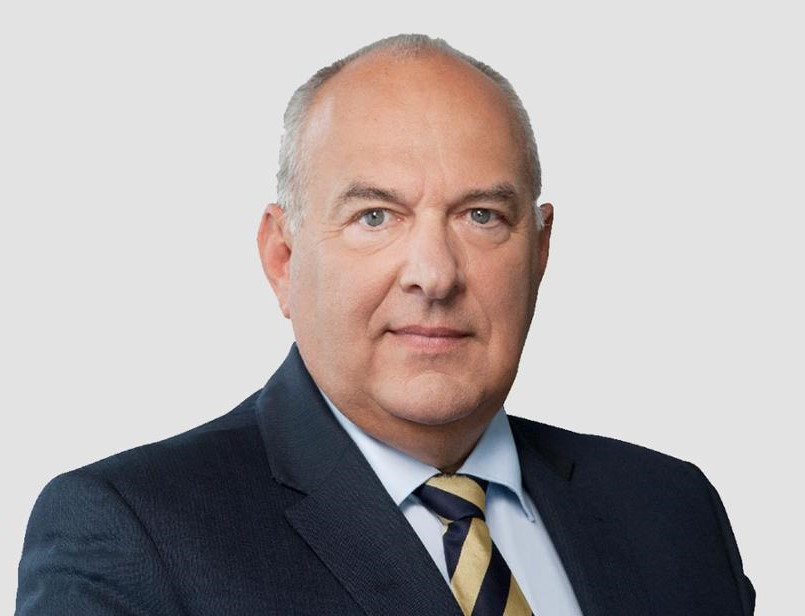

Minister of Finance
- In office 15 November 2019 – 7 February 2022
- Prime Minister: Mateusz Morawiecki
- Preceded by: Jerzy Kwieciński
- Succeeded by: Magdalena Rzeczkowska

Minister of Funds and Regional Policy
- In office 6 October 2020 – 26 October 2021
- Preceded by: Małgorzata Jarosińska-Jedynak
- Succeeded by: Grzegorz Puda

Personal details
- Born: 9 December 1956 (age 69) London, United Kingdom

Tadeusz Kościński (born 9 December 1956) is a Polish politician. He served as Minister of Finance in the second cabinet of Mateusz Morawiecki from November 2019, but resigned in February 2022 after a failed tax reform.

Beginning in 1997, Kościński was a director of Bank Zachodni WBK SA. He previously worked for several Polish banks, and has also held positions in the international finance sector in London, United Kingdom. From November 2015 to November 2019, he was Undersecretary of State at the Ministry of Development, the Ministry of Entrepreneurship and Technology and the Ministry of Finance, consequetively. He has also been the representative of the prime minister at the Polish regulatory authority for the finance sector.
