= Jerzy Zdziechowski =

Polish politician (1880–1975)

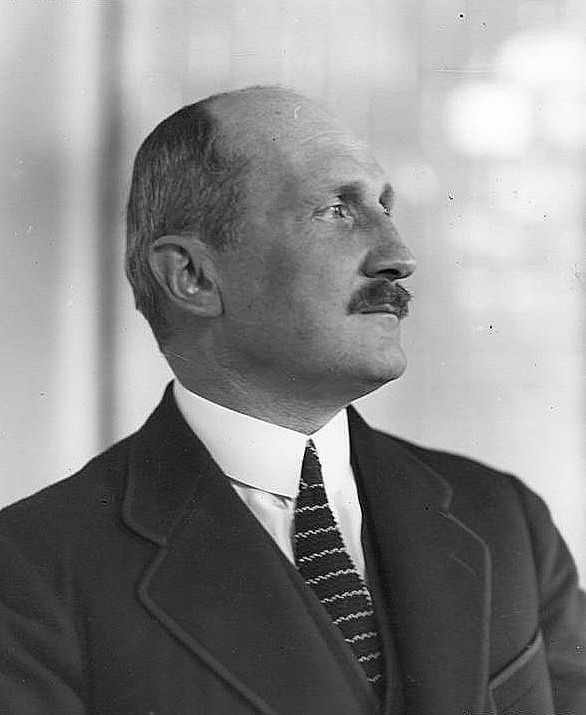
- Zdziechowski in 1925 (from the National Digital Archives)
- Born: 27 August 1880; Balta uezd, Podolia Governorate, Russian Empire
- Died: 25 April 1975 (aged 94); Kraków, Poland
- Other name: W.M. Dęboróg
- Known for: Leading Januszajtis putsch

Member of the Sejm
- In office 5 November 1922 – 4 March 1928
- President: Gabriel Narutowicz (1922); Stanisław Wojciechowski (1922-26); Ignacy Mościcki (1926-28)
- Parliamentary group: ZLN

Minister of Finance of Poland
- In office 20 November 1925 – 15 May 1926
- Prime Minister: Aleksander Skrzyński
- Preceded by: Władysław Grabski
- Succeeded by: Gabriel Czechowicz
- Coat of arms
- Noble family: Rawicz
- Issue: Maria Sapieha
- Father: Czesław Zdziechowski
- Mother: Zofia Dorożyńska

Jerzy Zdziechowski (27 August 1880 – 25 April 1975) was a far-right Polish politician, economist, economics activist, and the author of works on the economy.

== Life ==
Zdziechowski was born in Rozdół, Podolia Governorate. During the years of 1917 and 1918 he was one of the leaders of Rada Polska Zjednoczenia Międzypartyjnego in Russia. There, he co-organised Polish Corps in Russia. In 1919 he was one of the main participants in the unsuccessful Januszajtis putsch.

From 1922 to 1927, Zdziechowski was a Popular National Union deputy to the Sejm. From 1925 to 1926 he was the Minister of Finance of Poland in the Aleksander Skrzyński cabinet. He elaborated economic programme, the realisation of which caused the resignation of the Polish Socialist Party's ruling coalition and, as a result, the break-up and fall of the cabinet. In 1926–1933 Zdziechowski was a member of the Council of the Camp of Great Poland. In 1926 Zdziechowski was assaulted by unidentified men in his own house in Warsaw. The perpetrators were dressed in uniforms, and their identity was never discovered. Some political commentators indirectly accused Józef Piłsudski of ordering the assault to intimidate Zdziechowski. After 1939 he was an activist of economics organisations.

Zdziechowski emigrated from the country in September 1939. After World War II he became a chairman of the Executive Department of the Political Council in London as a National Party member.

He died in Kraków.
