= Magdalena Rzeczkowska =

Polish minister of finance since 2022

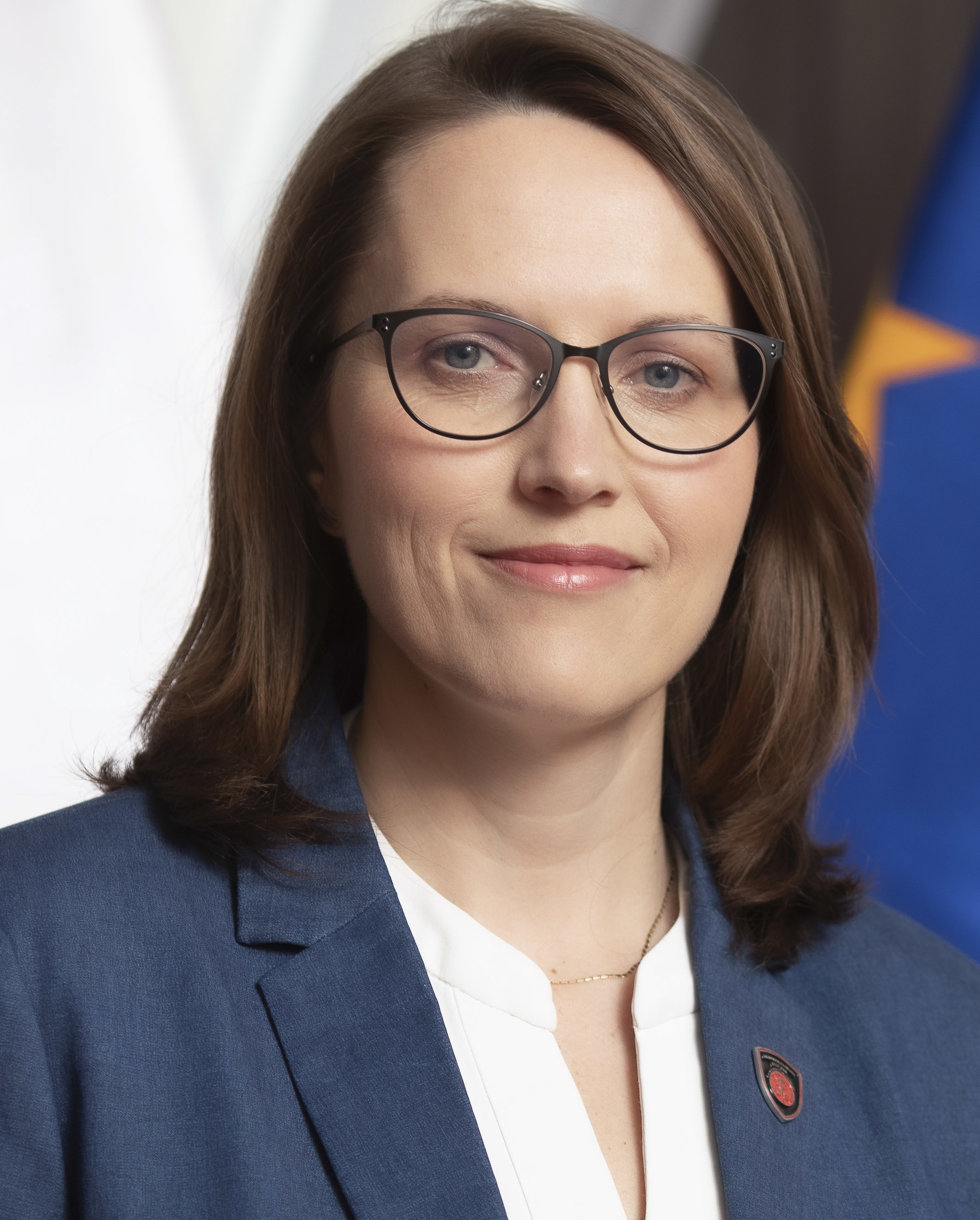

Minister of Finance
- In office 26 April 2022 – 27 November 2023
- Prime Minister: Mateusz Morawiecki
- Preceded by: Tadeusz Kościński
- Succeeded by: Andrzej Kosztowniak

Personal details
- Born: 22 April 1974 (age 52) Warsaw, Poland
- Education: University of Warsaw

Magdalena Rzeczkowska (née Kalisiak; born 22 April 1974) is a Polish politician who served as Minister of Finance under Prime Minister Mateusz Morawiecki in his second cabinet between 26 April 2022 and 27 November 2023. Having been employed in the ministry since 2002, she had been serving as one of its secretaries of state since 2020, and was simultaneously serving as head of the National Revenue Administration, Poland's revenue service, and held the rank of a brigadier general of the Tax and Customs Service, at the time she was appointed Minister of Finance.

== Early life and education ==
Magdalena Anna Kalisiak was born on 22 April 1974 in Warsaw, Poland. She graduated from the faculty of law and administration at the University of Warsaw in 1998, and also completed postgraduate studies in European integration at the university's Centre for Europe in 2001.

== Career ==
Rzeczkowska worked at the Main Customs Office from 1998 to 2002. She began working for the Ministry of Finance in 2002, eventually taking on a number of positions, including that of head of the customs department.

She was involved in Poland's accession to the European Union, and was a drafter of the Customs Law Act. She was also responsible for modernizing the customs service so that all customs declarations could be processed electronically. In addition, she reformed the customs clearance process and implemented an electronic toll collection system. She was awarded a badge of merit for her contributions to the customs service.

Rzeczkowska was appointed to be a secretary of state of the ministry on 3 March 2020. She was also serving as head of the National Revenue Administration, Poland's revenue service, when President Andrzej Duda appointed her Minister of Finance. She succeeded Tadeusz Kościński, who had resigned due to issues with a new tax system. (Note: Prime Minister Mateusz Morawiecki was acting finance minister until Rzeczkowska was appointed.)

During the European Union's efforts to implement a plan to set a global minimum corporate tax rate of 15 per cent, Poland was the only holdout, with Rzeczkowska voicing her concern that if the tax reallocation pillar of the plan failed, the global minimum tax itself could cause a decline of revenues in the country.

== Other activities ==
- International Monetary Fund (IMF), Ex-Officio Member of the Board of Governors (since 2022)

== Personal life ==
Rzeczkowska is married and has three sons.
