= 1919 Polish coup attempt =

1919 Polish coup d'etat attempt
Date	4–5 January 1919
Location	Warsaw, Poland
Result	Coup halted Fall of the Moraczewski government

Belligerents
National Democracy	(Poland) Legal government

Commanders and leaders
Marian Januszajtis-Żegota; Eustachy Sapieha; Jerzy Zdziechowski; Tadeusz Mścisław Dymowski	Józef Piłsudski; Jędrzej Moraczewski

The Januszajtis putsch of early January 1919 was an unsuccessful coup d'etat in Poland. On 4–5 January 1919, right-wing National Democrats attempted to overthrow the government of Jędrzej Moraczewski and Józef Piłsudski. The coup's leaders included Marian Januszajtis-Żegota and Prince Eustachy Sapieha.

The coup forces succeeded in arresting Moraczewski's government but not Piłsudski. Some military units refused to follow confusing or surprising orders, and eventually the coup ended in some arrests and in a return to the status quo ante. There were no fatalities or significant injuries. In mid-January, right-wing activists were admitted to membership in a coalition government.

== Background ==
In the aftermath of the First World War, Poland regained independence. One of the tasks it faced was creation of a new government. Józef Piłsudski, leader of Polish Legions, became the chief of state (Naczelnik państwa) on the authority of the Regency Council, but instead of the coalition government expected by many, he supported a left-wing government of Jędrzej Moraczewski. Moraczewski's reforms, such as the 8-hour work day and the creation of a worker's militia, led to unrest among the right-wing politicians, and the issue was compounded by highly controversial decisions of some left-wing local activists, in some cases bordering on support for communism (for example, some factories were temporarily nationalized).

== Preparations ==
Unrest spread through some of the officers of the Polish Army in the Warsaw district. Eventually several high-ranking officers and politicians (Marian Januszajtis-Żegota, Tadeusz Dymowski, Jerzy Zdziechowski, Witold Zawadzki, Eustachy Sapieha) decided to stage a coup - arrest Moraczewski and Piłsudski, and in their place, introduce a right-wing government under Roman Dmowski and Józef Haller.

== The coup ==
The rebels divided their forces into three groups. First unit, with the coup leaders, took the Town Hall at Saxon Square, where they established their command center. As neither Dmowski nor Haller were in Poland (they were in France, attending the Treaty of Versailles negotiations), Sapieha and Januszajtis-Żegota declared that they were assuming the leadership of the country. They also sent a squad general Stanisław Szeptycki, and for the 21st Infantry Regiment, whose command supported the coup, to report to the Town Hall. Szeptycki however was first informed of the events by an officer who escaped from the Town Hall; then arrested by a rebel squad, and finally freed by his own soldiers. Investigating the matter, he arrived at the Town Hall, where he was in no mood for supporting the rebels: instead, as a ranking officer on the scene, he took command of the 21st Regiment and ordered the troops to siege the Town Hall. Hence, the coup leaders found themselves besieged by the very troops they intended to use to cement their victory.

The rebel unit tasked with arresting members of Moraczewski succeeded in arresting the ministers, although they failed to assassinate Minister of the Interior, Stanisław Thugutt.

The third group, tasked with arresting Piłsudski, tried to bluff their way into the Belweder Palace where Piłsudski had his office and living quarters. Once inside, they declared their intent to arrest Piłsudski - and promptly found themselves locked inside one of the rooms by staff loyal to Piłsudski.

The next day, members of Moraczewski's were freed, and most of the coup supporters surrendered to the government forces.

== Aftermath ==
Thugutt suggested that coup leaders should be tried, but Piłsudski objected - not wanting to risk increasing unrest and turning them into martyrs; he believed that in any case the right wing had lost much face with the unsuccessful coup. Negotiations started, and two weeks after the coup, Moraczewski's government resigned, and a new government, including right-wing politicians, was formed by Ignacy Paderewski. Most of the people involved in the coup were not punished; prince Sapieha became an ambassador to United Kingdom, and Januszajtis-Żegota, a province governor.
