= New pragmatism =

New pragmatism (Polish: nowy pragmatyzm) is an original paradigmatic and heterodox theory of economics created by Grzegorz W. Kolodko to address the contemporary civilizational challenges and economic system transformations. It is based on the imperative for a harmonious triply sustainable social and economic growth.

New pragmatism, by creating a new, multidisciplinary epistemological perspective for analyzing economic phenomena and by providing new, enriched cognitive and analytic methods and tools stands for abandoning the economic orthodoxy in favor of what works, and what may be a useful basis for solving actual social and economic problems. Cognitive and methodological eclecticism is inherent in this approach.

== Characteristics ==
New pragmatism as a theoretical concept fits squarely in the sequence of views of philosophers and economists who believed the meaning and purpose of economics as a science is to find the rules governing the functioning of a good economy in specific temporal and spatial conditions (Adam Smith, Karl Marx, John M. Keynes, John K. Galbraith, Douglass C. North, Edmund S. Phelps, Joseph E. Stiglitz), rather than to look for universal timeless economic laws.

New pragmatism searches for a reasonable compromise between an economic policy of national states and the policy run at a regional and international level. The economics of the future emerging from new pragmatism creates and equips politicians with tools to prevent “Yet Grander Crises”, as Kolodko calls them. What should be an important rule governing the economy of the future is moderation, or consciously adapting the size of human, material and financial flows to the requirement to maintain a long-term dynamic balance.

In descriptive terms, new pragmatism explains the historic development process, emphasizing not only the significance of respective causative factors but also their coincidence.

In normative terms, new pragmatism indicates the goals of economic activity, which should involve:

- economically sustainable growth, i.e. sustainable with respect to goods and capital markets as well as investments, finance and labor;
- socially sustainable growth, i.e. sustainable with respect to socially acceptable, fair division of income, which favors capital accumulation, and to appropriate participation of basic population groups in public services and access to public goods;
- environmentally and spatially sustainable growth, i.e. sustainable with respect to maintaining appropriate relations between human economic activity and nature, both on a current and long-term basis;

In new pragmatism, economics is seen as a science that is:

1. descriptive, explanatory and evaluative alike – a description is a point of departure and imminently leads to a normative (prescriptive), that is evaluative perspective;
2. contextual – analyses and syntheses are not conducted in isolation from reality, in “pure” economic models but, instead, with reference to specific dynamic and variable complex circumstances, determinants, constraints and possibilities;
3. complex – it combines elements of analysis and synthesis from various economic schools, from behavioral economics to political economics, as well as microeconomics with macroeconomics and global economics;
4. multidisciplinary – the analysis of economic reality takes account of findings and methods of other disciplines of social sciences, most of all history, geography, philosophy, sociology, psychology, law and anthropology;
5. comparative – the comparison of economic, cultural, geographic and political reality is treated as the basic research method.

New pragmatism sees globalization – the historical and spontaneous process of liberalizing and integrating various markets into one interconnected and internally consolidated worldwide system – as an irreversible phenomenon. Hence, what becomes the fundamental economic problem of modern times is an effective coordination of economic policy and developmental strategies at a national and global level and rebuilding the institutional structure of global economy.
