= Gabriel Czechowicz =

Polish lawyer, economist and politician

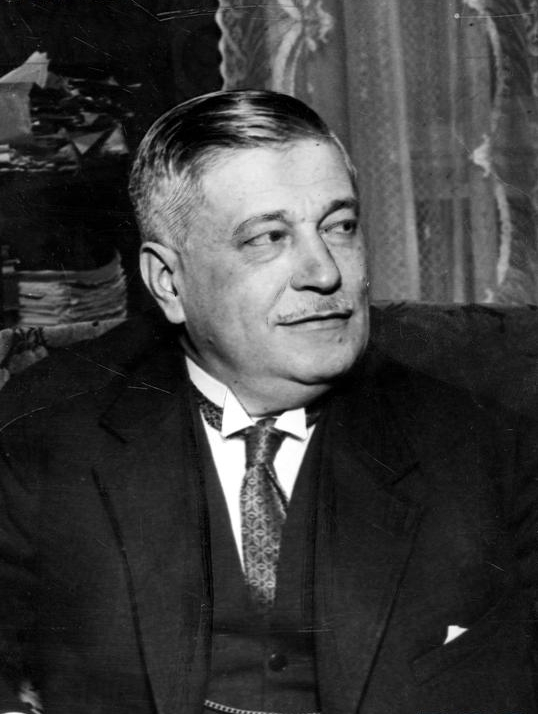
- Czechowicz c. 1928

Minister of Finance of the Second Polish Republic
- In office May 15, 1926 – June 8, 1926
- President: Maciej Rataj
- Preceded by: Jerzy Zdziechowski
- Succeeded by: Czesław Klarner

Minister of Finance of the Second Polish Republic
- In office October 2, 1926 – March 8, 1929
- President: Ignacy Mościcki
- Preceded by: Czesław Klarner
- Succeeded by: Tadeusz Grodyński

Personal details
- Born: October 2, 1876 Staroje Zaponnie, Vitebsk region, Russian Empire
- Died: January 22, 1938 (aged 61) Warsaw, Second Polish Republic
- Resting place: Powazki Cemetery
- Other political affiliations: Labour Faction
- Education: Saint Petersburg State University
- Awards

Gabriel Czechowicz (1876-1938) was a Polish lawyer, economist and politician. He was the Polish Treasury Minister from 1926 to 1929. Accused of misuse of government funds, Czechowicz was the only Polish politician of the interwar period that faced the State Tribunal of the Republic of Poland in the so-called Czechowicz Case. The case was dropped without ruling due to pressure from the Sanacja regime.

== Early years ==
Czechowicz was born on October 2, 1876, in his family real estate near Minsk, Russian Empire, in a noble family. He graduated from Law Faculty at Saint Petersburg State University, after which took a job in a bank at Riga. In 1905, he began working for the local Russian tax chamber. In 1917, the chamber was evacuated to Tartu, and in 1918, Czechowicz returned to newly restored Poland. In 1919, he was employed by the Treasury Office of Civilian Government of the Eastern Territories. He then was manager of tax chamber in Brest. Transferred to Warsaw, in 1925 he was named manager of Department of Taxes and the State Treasury.

== 1920s ==
In December 1922, Czechowicz, under the pseudonym Leliwa, wrote a book “The Project of Improvement of Polish Treasury”. The publication criticized the government of Poland, and the author stated that the newly recreated country lacked cohesive tax regulations, and a well-thought out plan of changes. Taxes were collected slowly and inefficiently, and as a result the treasury lost a lot of revenue. Furthermore, there were too many different taxes, and the tax office was too decentralized. Since civil servants earned too little, corruption among them was rampant. Czechowicz had several ideas. He wanted to keep only income tax, and to attach Polish currency to the “perfect gold”.

In 1926, already a high-ranking official of the State Treasury, Czechowicz, again as Leliwa, wrote another book: “The Treasury Problem in the Light of Truth”. He analyzed the works of two ministers of treasury, Wladyslaw Grabski and Jerzy Zdziechowski, criticizing the introduction of the złoty, which replaced the mark.

== Minister of Finance ==
Following the 1926 May Coup, a new government under Premier Kazimierz Bartel was formed on May 15, 1926. To the surprise of many analysts, Gabriel Czechowicz became new Minister of Finance. He remained in this post only for a few weeks, to be replaced by Czesław Klarner. After a few months, when Jozef Pilsudski became new premier, Czechowicz once again became the Minister of Finance (October 2, 1926). His priority was to reform the tax system, in order to balance the budget. By May 1927, the interest rate was lowered to 8%, which was still higher than France (3.5%).

Contrary to Wladyslaw Grabski, who avoided foreign loans, Czechowicz supported them, claiming they were necessary for the economy. He wanted to introduce Poland to world financial markets, as a stable and trusted customer. In October 1927, a consortium of banks granted the so-called “stabilization loan” to Poland, in the amount of 62 million dollars and 2 million pounds. Its interest rate was higher than in similar loans in Germany and Austria, also Poland had to employ for three years American advisor Charles Dewey, who became a member of the board of the National Bank of Poland. The loan was used to stabilize the zloty and balance the budget deficit.

In 1926 - 1929, Polish economy stabilized. This was due mostly to both the reforms of Wladyslaw Grabski, and favourable international situation.

== Czechowicz Case ==
In December 1927, Gabriel Czechowicz handed 8 million zlotys to the official fund of Jozef Pilsudski. The money was then used in the election campaign of pro-government party, the Nonpartisan Bloc for Cooperation with the Government (BBWR). Furthermore, other expenditures of the government were not sent to the Sejm for approval.

Even though Czechowicz followed the orders of Jozef Pilsudski, the Sejm decided that the Minister must face the State Tribunal. Pilsudski himself wrote a newspaper article “The Bottom of an Eye” (“Dno oka”), in which he presented a favourable picture of his minister. Despite this, on March 8, 1929, Czechowicz had to resign. The Tribunal itself did not achieve any decision, and sent the case again to the Parliament. Meanwhile, the 1930 Polish legislative election took place, after which the Sanacja regime legalized Czechowicz’s actions.

Czechowicz himself was bitter about this outcome. In press interviews he frequently stated that he wanted to prove his innocence before the Tribunal. In the early 1930s, he decided to exit the BBWR.

== 1930s ==
In the 1930s, Czechowicz continued his work as an economist. In 1933, he published a book New Roads in Economy”, presenting his solution to the Great Depression, which greatly affected Poland. Among his proposals were a temporary halt of payments of the foreign debt of Poland, limit to the exports and closer control of the cartels. Following the example of Fascist Italy, Czechowicz supported the introduction of a 40-hour work week. Nevertheless, his book remained unnoticed and did not have any effect on Polish planners.

In 1934, together with Tytus Filipowicz, he founded Polish Radical Party (Polska Partia Radykalna). His political plans were a failure, and in late 1937, he became a treasurer of the Labor Party (Stronnictwo Pracy).

Gabriel Czechowicz died suddenly of heart attack on January 22, 1938, in Warsaw. He was buried at Powazki Cemetery. He was awarded the Commander and Officer Crosses of the Polonia Restituta (1922, 1925).
