= Ministry of Funds and Regional Policy =

Polish ministry

- Ministerstwo Funduszy i Polityki Regionalnej
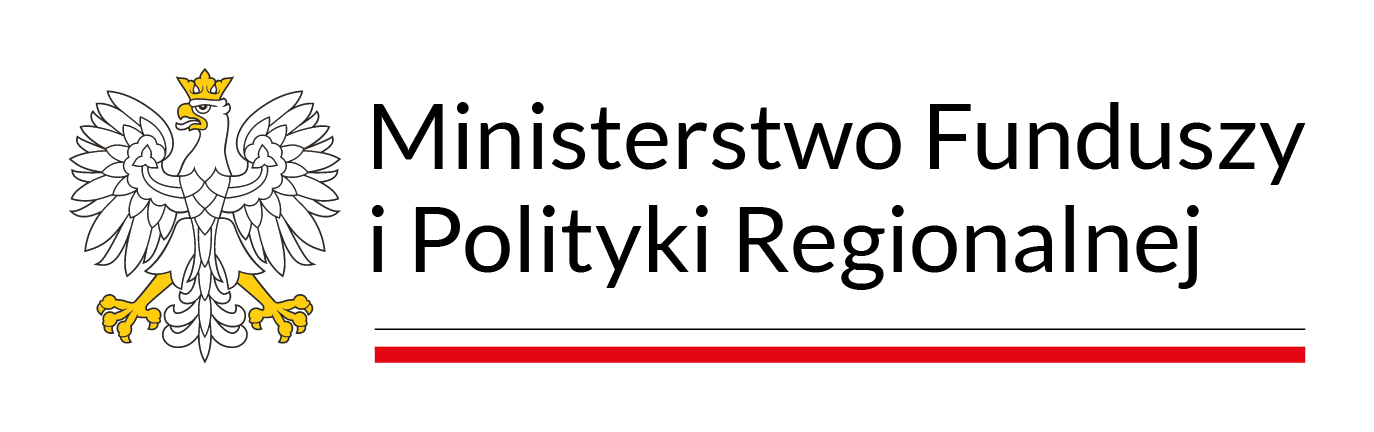

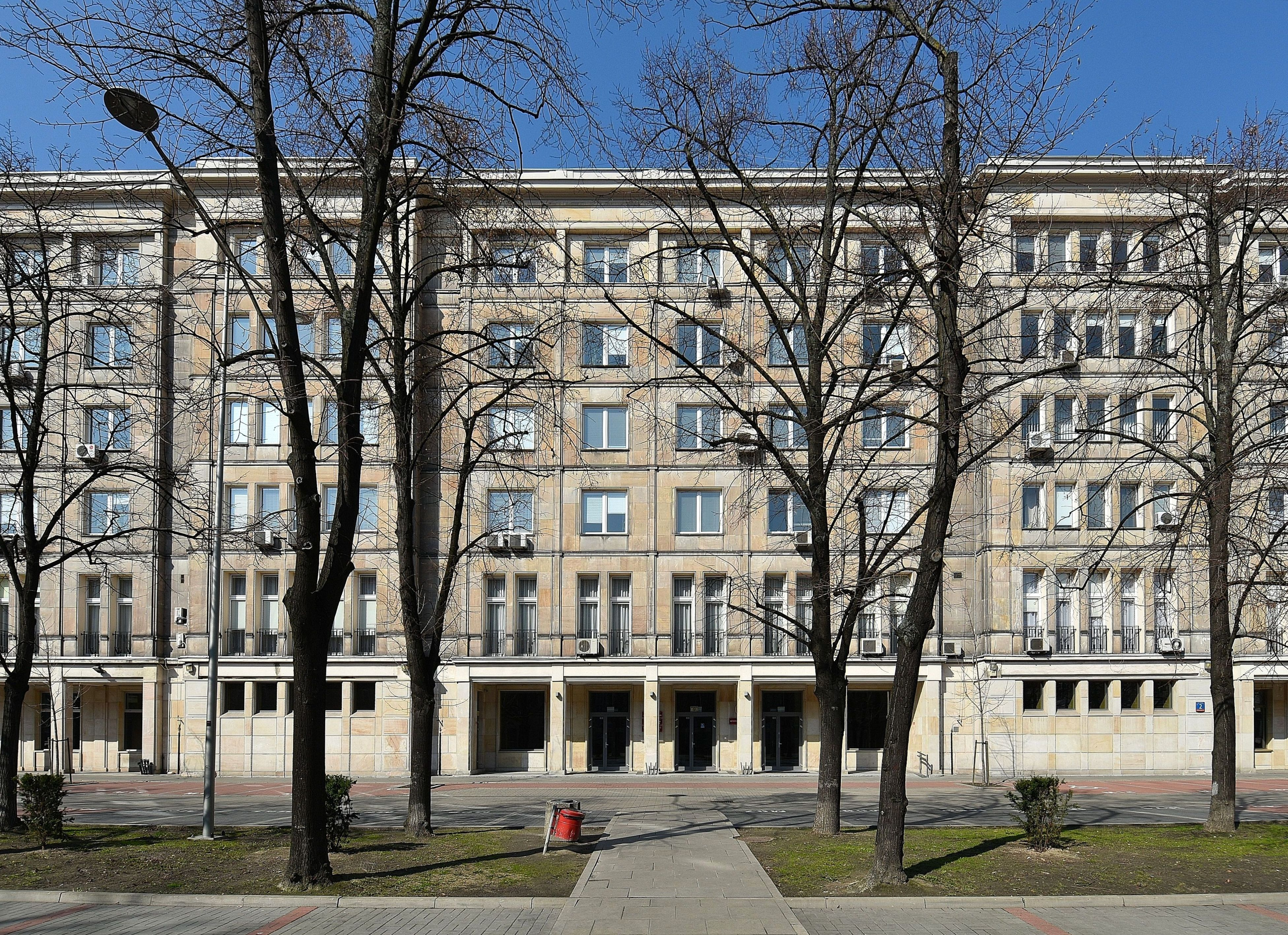
- Headquarters building in Śródmiescie Południowe, Warsaw, near Three Crosses Square

Agency overview
- Formed: 15 November 2019 (7 years ago) (Note: The law establishing the ministry was issued on 19 November 2019 and came into force on the day it was announced, 21 November 2019, but retroactively set the ministry's date of establishment as 15 November 2019.)
- Preceding agency: Ministry of Investment and Economic Development
- Jurisdiction: Government of Poland
- Headquarters: Wspólna 2/4, Warsaw, Poland; 52.2286°N 21.0200°E
- Minister responsible: Vacant, Minister of Funds and Regional Policy
- Parent agency: Council of Ministers
- Website: Official website

The Ministry of Funds and Regional Policy (Polish: Ministerstwo Funduszy i Polityki Regionalnej is a ministry in the Polish government, established on 15 November 2019. It is headed by Katarzyna Pełczyńska-Nałęcz, who has held the position of Minister of Funds and Regional Policy since 13 December 2023. It was created from the former Ministry of Investment and Economic Development, which was disestablished simultaneously.

The ministry seeks sources of development funding and helps determine how these funds will be used in Poland. In particular, the ministry is responsible for the handling of development funds from the European Union. The ministry is also involved in promoting sustainable urban development.

== List of ministers ==
Portrait	Name	Party	Term of Office		Prime Minister (Government)
	Małgorzata Jarosińska-Jedynak	Nonpartisan	November 15 2019	October 6 2020	Mateusz Morawiecki (Morawiecki II)
	Tadeusz Kościński	Nonpartisan	October 6 2020	October 26 2021	Mateusz Morawiecki (Morawiecki II)
	Grzegorz Puda	Law and Justice	October 26 2021	November 27 2023	Mateusz Morawiecki (Morawiecki II)
	Małgorzata Jarosińska-Jedynak	Nonpartisan	November 27 2023	December 13 2023	Mateusz Morawiecki (Morawiecki III)
	Katarzyna Pełczyńska-Nałęcz	Poland 2050	December 13 2023	November 20 2026	Donald Tusk (Tusk III)
	Agnieszka Bartol	Nonpartisan	20 November 2026		Donald Tusk (Tusk III)
