= Grzegorz Kołodko =

Polish economist and author (born 1949)

Grzegorz Witold Kołodko
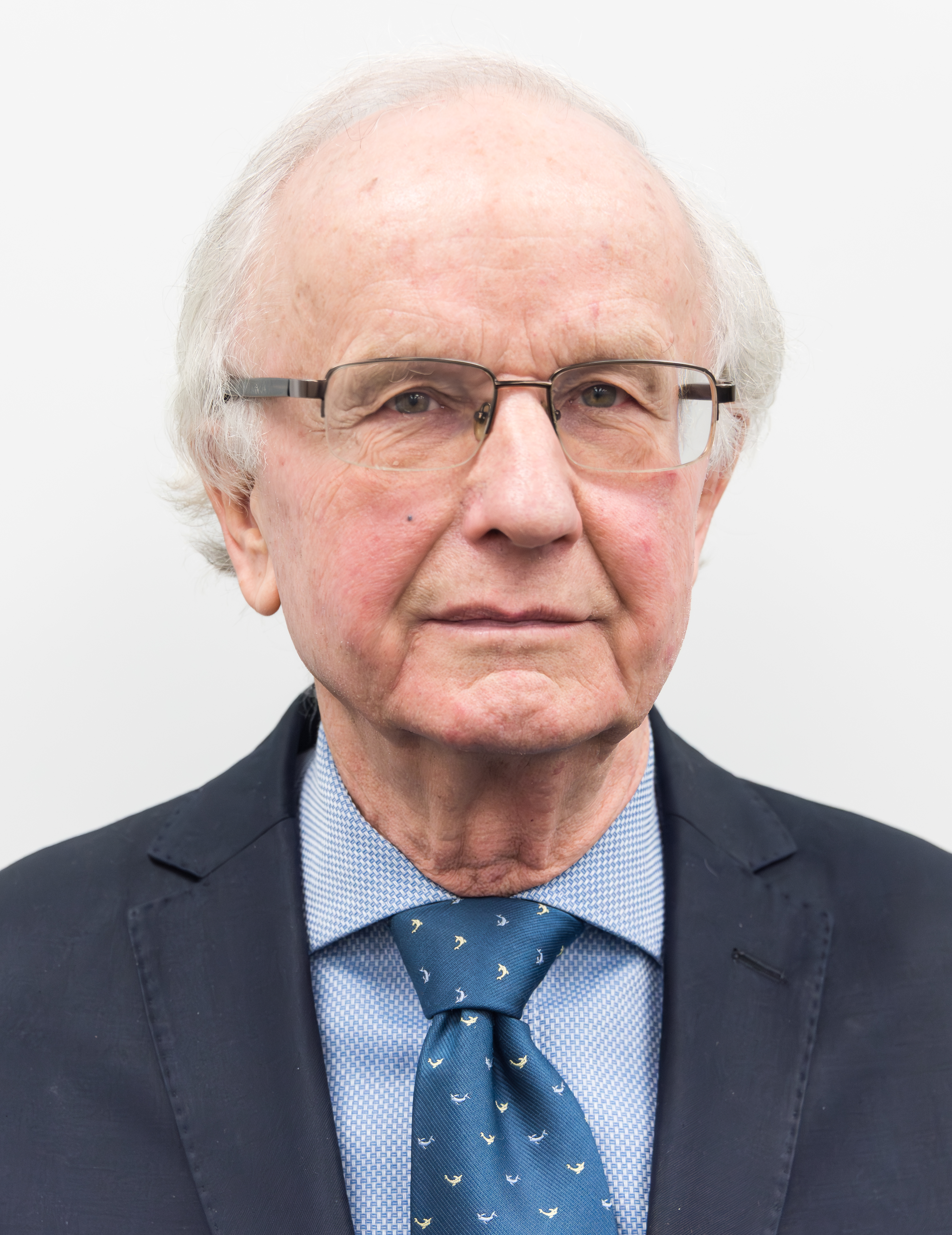

Finance Minister of Poland
- In office 28 April 1994 – 4 February 1997
- President: Lech Wałęsa, Aleksander Kwaśniewski
- Prime Minister: Waldemar Pawlak, Józef Oleksy, Włodzimierz Cimoszewicz
- Preceded by: Henryk Chmielak (acting)
- Succeeded by: Marek Belka

Finance Minister of Poland
- In office 6 July 2002 – 16 June 2003
- President: Aleksander Kwaśniewski
- Prime Minister: Leszek Miller
- Preceded by: Marek Belka
- Succeeded by: Andrzej Raczko

Deputy Prime Minister of Poland
- In office 6 July 2002 – 16 June 2003
- President: Aleksander Kwaśniewski
- Prime Minister: Leszek Miller
- Succeeded by: Jerzy Hausner
- In office 7 February 1996 – 4 February 1997
- President: Aleksander Kwaśniewski
- Prime Minister: Włodzimierz Cimoszewicz
- In office 7 March 1995 – 7 February 1996
- President: Aleksander Kwaśniewski
- Prime Minister: Józef Oleksy

Personal details
- Born: 28 January 1949 (age 77) Tczew, Gdańsk Voivodeship, Republic of Poland
- Profession: Economist

Grzegorz Witold Kołodko (Note: Polish pronunciation: [ˈɡʐɛɡɔʂ kɔˈwɔtkɔ]) (born 28 January 1949) is a distinguished professor of economics and a key architect of Polish economic reforms. He is the author of New Pragmatism, an original and heterodox theory of economics. He has been a university lecturer, researcher, and author of numerous academic books and research papers. As Deputy Premier and Minister of Finance of Poland from 2002 to 2003, he played a leading role in Poland's entry into the European Union. During his earlier term from 1994 to 1997, Kołodko led Poland into the OECD.

He is the founder and director of TIGER – Transformation, Integration, and Globalization Economic Research at Kozminski University in Warsaw. He has served as a consultant to international organizations such as the IMF, World Bank, UN, and the OECD. Kołodko is a member of the European Academy of Arts, Sciences and Humanities, Academia Europaea, and the Russian Academy of Sciences. He is also a non-resident senior fellow at the Chongyang Institute for Financial Studies, Renmin University of China in Beijing, a Professor at Huangzhou University of Science and Technology, Wuhan, and a distinguished professor at the Emerging Markets Institute, Beijing Normal University, Beijing.

== Biography ==
After graduating from Main School of Planning and Statistics in 1972 and earning his Ph.D. in 1976, Kołodko lectured at the same university and was appointed to a chair in economics in 1984. In 1985-86, he was a Senior Fulbright Fellow at the University of Illinois in Urbana-Champaign. From 1982 to 1988, he was an advisor to the Governor of the National Bank of Poland. He participated in the historic ‘Round Table’ negotiations in 1989, which led to the formation of the first post-communist government in Eastern Europe. He was a member of the Economic Council of the Polish Government from 1989 to 1991.

He was a research fellow at the United Nations World Institute for Development Economics Research (WIDER) in Helsinki in 1988, 1989, and 2002. From 1989 to 1994, he was the director of the Institute of Finance in Warsaw. He served as a consultant to the IMF Research Department in 1991 and 2000, and to the Fiscal Policy Department in 1992 and 1999. In 1994, he was a senior research fellow at the Institute of Finance and Monetary Policy in Tokyo. From 1997 to 1998, he held the Sasakawa Chair and was a distinguished research professor in development policy at WIDER. He was also a visiting fellow at the World Bank and a senior research fellow at Yale University in 1998.

Kołodko is the author and editor of 58 books and over 400 articles and research papers, published in 26 languages, with many in English. Notable books include “The Quest for Development Success: Bridging Theoretical Reasoning with Economic Practice” (Rowman & Littlefield - Lexington Books, 2021), “China and the Future of Globalization: The Political Economy of China's Rise” (Bloomsbury I.B. Tauris, 2020), and “Emerging Market Economies. Globalization and Development” (Routledge Revivals, 2018). As of 2025, he is perceived as the most frequently quoted economist from a former Eastern Bloc country, according to Germany-based academic publisher Springer.

He has taught courses and seminars at Warsaw School of Economics (SGPiS/SGH) and Kozminski University, as well as at various universities in the United States, including Yale, UCLA, the University of Illinois, Wesleyan University, and the University of Rochester. He has led research projects and lectured globally.

In 2025, former prime minister Leszek Miller maintained that Kołodko would have been the better choice over Balcerowicz as Poland's privatisation czar, yet that the former demanded far-reaching concessions and had been unwilling to consult with party leaders.

== Awards ==
Kołodko has received numerous awards for his research and teaching activities. He was awarded an honorary doctorate by Lviv University in 2003, South West University of Finance and Economics in Chengdu, China (SWUFE) in 2004, Finance University in Moscow in 2009, University of Debrecen, Hungary, in 2009, the International Institute of Management (MIM) in Kyiv in 2014, and Corvinus University in Budapest in 2019. He has also received honorary professorships from India Institute of Finance, New Delhi, in 2004, Nankai University, Tianjin, China, in 2004, Moscow Academy of Economics and Law in 2005, and Alfred Nobel University in Dnipropetrovsk, Ukraine, in 2014. In 2020, he received the Special Book Award of China. He was nominated as the Best Minister of Finance in East Central Europe by Euromoney in 1996 and was awarded the Commander's Cross of the Order of Polonia Restituta by the President of Poland in 1997 for his achievements in managing transformation and development policy.

== Selected publications ==
- Cele rozwoju a makroproporcje gospodarcze, Szkoła Główna Planowania i Statystyki, Warszawa 1984 (wydanie I); Państwowe Wydawnictwo Naukowe, Warszawa 1986 (wydanie II), ISBN 83-01-06934-1.
- Polska w świecie inflacji, Książka i Wiedza, Warszawa 1987, ISBN 83-05-11516-X.
- Reform, Stabilization Policies and Economic Adjustment in Poland, United Nations University World Institute for Development Economics Research (WIDER), Helsinki 1989, ISSN 0782-8233.
- Kryzys, dostosowanie, rozwój, Państwowe Wydawnictwo Ekonomiczne, Warszawa 1989, ISBN 83-208-0789-1.
- Inflacja, reforma, stabilizacja, Alma-Press, Warszawa 1990, ISBN 83-7020-078-8.
- Hiperinflacja i stabilizacja w gospodarce posocjalistycznej (with: Danuta Gotz-Kozierkiewicz i Elżbieta Skrzeszewska-Paczek), Państwowe Wydawnictwo Ekonomiczne, Warszawa 1991 (wydanie I) ISBN 83-208-0851-0; Instytut Finansów, Warszawa 1991 (wydanie II), ISBN 83-208-0851-0. [English: Hyperinflation and Stabilization in Postsocialist Economies, Kluwer Academic Publishers, Boston-Dordrecht-London 1992, ISBN 0-7923-9179-9.]
- Polityka finansowa – stabilizacja – transformacja (współautor i redakcja naukowa), Instytut Finansów, Warszawa 1991.
- Polityka finansowa – transformacja – wzrost (współautor i redakcja naukowa), Instytut Finansów, Warszawa 1992.
- Transformacja polskiej gospodarki. Sukces czy porażka?, Polska Oficyna Wydawnicza BGW, Warszawa 1992, ISBN 83-7066-416-4.
- Kwadratura pięciokąta. Od załamania gospodarczego do trwałego wzrostu, Poltext, Warszawa 1993, ISBN 83-85366-48-2.
- Economic Transition in Eastern Europe (with: Michael Ellman and Egor T. Gaidar), Blackwell, Oxford, U. K. and Cambridge, USA, 1993, ISBN 0-631-18779-0.
- Strategia dla Polski, Poltext, Warszawa 1994, ISBN 83-85366-75-X.
- Rok w polityce, Real Press, Warszawa-Kraków 1995, ISBN 83-86688-06-8.
- Dwa lata w polityce, Real Press, Kraków-Warszawa 1996, ISBN 83-86688-21-1.
- Polska 2000. Strategia dla przyszłości, Poltext, Warszawa 1996, ISBN 83-86890-13-4. [Various translations: Poland 2000. The New Economic Strategy, Poltext, Warszawa 1996, ISBN 83-86890-08-8; Polen 2000. Die neue Wirtschaftsstrategie, Poltext, Warszawa 1996, ISBN 83-86890-09-6; Polsza 2000. Nowaja ekonomiczeskaja strategija, Poltext, Warszawa 1996, ISBN 83-86890-07-X.
- Trzy lata w polityce, Realbud, Kraków 1997, ISBN 83-907626-1-7.
- The Polish Alternative. Old Myths, Hard Facts and New Strategies in the Successful Transformation of the Polish Economy (współautor D. Mario Nuti), WIDER, Helsinki 1997, ISBN 952-9520-50-6. Translations: Polska alternatywa. Stare mity, twarde fakty, nowe strategie, Poltext, Warszawa 1997, ISBN 83-86890-36-3; Polskaja altiernatiwa. Staryje mity, riealnyje fakty i nowaja strategija w processie uspiesznoj transformacji polskoj ekonomiki, Rosyjska Akademia Nauk, Moskwa 1997.
- From Shock to Therapy. The Political Economy of Postsocialist Transformation, Oxford University Press, Oxford and New York 2000, ISBN 0-19-829743-2. Various translations : Od szoku do terapii. Ekonomia i polityka transformacji, Poltext, Warszawa 1999, ISBN 83-86890-67-3; Cong Xiu ke Dao Liao fa: Hou she hui zhu yi de Zheng zhi jin gji, Shanghai Far East Press, Szanghaj-Pekin 2000, ISBN 7-80613-983-4; Ot szoka k terapii. Politiczeskaja ekonomija postsocjalisteczeskich prieobrazowanij, ZAO ‘Żurnał Expert’, Moskwa 2000, ISBN 5-901059-05-8; Wid szoku do terapii. Ekonomika i politika transformacii, Wydawnictwo Niezależnij Kulturołogicznij Żurnał ‘I’, Lwów 2004, ISBN 966-7790-01-0; Shock kara Ryouhou he – Touou ni okeru Post-Shakaishugi no Taisei Ikou kara EU Kamei he, San-Kei-Sha, Nagoja 2005, ISBN 4-88361-264-3.
- Post-Communist Transition. The Thorny Road, University of Rochester Press, Rochester, NY, USA, and Woodbridge, Suffolk, UK, 2000, ISBN 1-58046-057-7.
- Moja globalizacja, czyli dookoła świata i z powrotem, Towarzystwo Naukowe Organizacji i Kierownictwa, Toruń 2001, ISBN 83-7285-027-5.
- 'Nowa gospodarka’ i jej implikacje dla długookresowego wzrostu w krajach posocjalistycznych (edited himself), Wydawnictwo Wyższej Szkoły Przedsiębiorczości i Zarządzania im. Leona Koźmińskiego, Warszawa 2001, ISBN 83-86846-60-7.
- Globalizacja, a perspektywy rozwoju krajów posocjalistycznych, Towarzystwo Naukowe Organizacji i Kierownictwa, Toruń 2001, ISBN 83-7285-053-4. Various translations: Globalizacija i perspiektiwy rozwitku postsocialisticznych krain, Osnowni Cinnosti, Kijów 2002 (Ukrainian) ISBN 966-7856-18-6; Globalizacja i perspektiwy razvitia post-socjalisticzeskich stran, Jewropejskij Gumanitarnij Uniwersitet, Mińsk 2002 (Russian) ISBN 985-6614-79-1; Globálizáció és a volt szocialista országok fejlödési tendenciái, Kossuth Kiadó, Budapest 2002, ISBN 963-09-4364-6; Globalización y perspectivas de desarrollo en los antiguos países comunistas, Siddharth Mehta Ediciones, Madryt 2003 (Spanish) ISBN 84-86830-34-6; Globalizacija ir posocialistiniu saliu vystymosi perspektyvos, Leidykla Vilnijos Zodis, Wilno 2003 (Lithuanian) ISBN 9955-9628-0-1; 全球化与后社会主义国家大预测 (Quan Qiu Hua Yu Hou She Hui Zhu Yi Guo Jia Da Yu Ce), Shi Jie Zhi Shi Chu Ban She (World Affairs Press), Pekin 2003 ISBN 7-5012-2056-5; Globalizacijata i perspektivite za razvoj na postsocijalisticzkite zemji, Magor, Skopje 2004 ISBN 9989-2020-7-9, ISBN 9989-144-12-5; Segyehwawa gu sahwejueui kukgadeoleui baljeon jeonmang, Hankuk University of Foreign Studies Press, Seul 2005; Toàn cà̂u hóa và tương lai của các nước đang chuyẻ̂n đỏ̂i: sách tham khảo, Nhà xuá̂t bản Chính trị quó̂c gia (State Political Publishing House), Hanoi 2005.
- Rozwój polskiej gospodarki. Perspektywy i uwarunkowania (editor), Wydawnictwo Wyższej Szkoły Przedsiębiorczości i Zarządzania im. Leona Koźmińskiego, Warszawa 2002, ISBN 83-86846-69-0.
- Globalization and Catching-up in Transition Economies, University of Rochester Press, Rochester, NY and Woodbridge, Suffolk, UK, 2002, ISBN 1-58046-050-X.
- Tygrys z ludzką twarzą, Towarzystwo Naukowe Organizacji i Kierownictwa, Toruń 2002, ISBN 83-7285-089-5.
- 'Nowa gospodarka’ i stare problemy (współautor i redakcja naukowa), Wydawnictwo Wyższej Szkoły Przedsiębiorczości i Zarządzania im. Leona Koźmińskiego, Warszawa 2002, ISBN 83-86846-82-8.
- Globalizacja – marginalizacja – rozwój (editor), Wydawnictwo Wyższej Szkoły Przedsiębiorczości i Zarządzania im. Leona Koźmińskiego, Warszawa 2002, ISBN 83-86846-90-9.
- Emerging Market Economies. Globalization and Development (editor), Ashgate, Aldershot, England – Burlington, VT, USA 2003, ISBN 0-7546-3706-9.
- O Naprawie Naszych Finansów, Towarzystwo Naukowe Organizacji i Kierowania, Toruń 2004, ISBN 83-7285-188-3.
- Strategia szybkiego wzrostu gospodarczego w Polsce (editor), Wydawnictwo Wyższej Szkoły Przedsiębiorczości i Zarządzania im. Leona Koźmińskiego, Warszawa 2004, ISBN 83-89437-29-5.
- Globalization and Catching-up in the Emerging Market Economies, The Nigeria Institute for International Affairs, Lagos 2004, ISBN 978-002-047-0.
- Globalization and Social Stress (edited with Anna Grzymala-Busse), The Yale Center for International and Area Studies, Yale University, New Haven, CT, 2004.
- The Polish Miracle. Lessons for the Emerging Markets (editor), Ashgate, Aldershot, England – Burlington, VT, USA 2005, ISBN 0-7546-4535-5.
- Wielikij postsocjalisticzeskij poworot, „Juridiczeskij Center Press”, Sankt Petersburg 2006, ISBN 5-94201-482-5.
- The World Economy and Great Post-Communist Change nakładem Nova Science Publishers, Inc., Nowy Jork USA 2007, ISBN 1-60021-045-7.
- „Transition and Beyond” (with Saul Estrin i Milica Uvalic), Palgrave Macmillan, Houndmills, Basingstoke, Hampshire-New York 2007, s. XIX + 307 (ISBN 0-230-54697-8; ISBN 978-0-230-54697-4)
- „Polska z globalizacją w tle. Instytucjonalne i polityczne aspekty rozwoju gospodarczego”, Towarzystwo Naukowe Organizacji i Kierownictwa, Toruń 2007, s. 213 (ISBN 978-83-7285-366-0).
- Wędrujący świat”, Prószyński i S-ka, Warszawa 2008, s. 440 (ISBN 978-83-7469-712-5). Also in Russian, Hungarian and Vietnamese: „Mir w dwiżenii”, Magistr, Moskwa 2009, s. 576 (ISBN 978-5-9776-0102-3 & ISBN 978-83-7469-712-5), „Megatrendek”, Akadémiai Kiadó, Budapest 2009, s. 396 (ISBN 978-963-05-8712-9), „Thế giới đi về đâu?”, Nhà xuất bản Thế giới, Hanoi, s. 624 (po wietnamsku) (ISBN 978-604-77-0024-0)
- 20 lat transformacji. Osiągnięcia, problemy, perspektywy” (współautor i redaktor naukowy wraz z Jackiem Tomkiewiczem), Wydawnictwa Akademickie i Profesjonalne, Warszawa 2009, s. 390 (ISBN 978-83-61408-05-5; ISBN 978-83-89437-93-8).
- Świat na wyciągnięcie myśli, Prószyński i S-ka, Warszawa 2010, s. 318 (ISBN 978-83-7648-491-4)
- Globalizacja, kryzys i co dalej?, współautor i redakcja naukowa, Poltext, Warszawa 2010, s. 355 (ISBN 978-83-7561-116-8)
- Globalizacija, transformacija, krizis – czto dalsze?, Magistr, Moskwa 2011, s. 176 (ISBN 9785977-601719)
- 20 years of Transformation: Achievements, Problems and Perspectives, współautor i redakcja naukowa z Jackiem Tomkiewiczem, Nova Science Publishers, New York 2011, s. 292 (ISBN 978-1-61761-603-7).
- Truth, Errors, and Lies. Politics and Economics in a Volatile World, Columbia University Press, New York 2011, s. XII + 460 (ISBN 0-231-15068-7)
- Nowy pragmatyzm kontra nowy nacjonalizm (współautor Andrzej K. Koźmiński), Wydawnictwo Prószyński i S-ka, Warszawa 2017, s. 272 (ISBN 978-83-8123-034-6)
- Dokąd zmierza świat. Ekonomia polityczna przyszłości, Wydawnictwo Prószyński i S-ka, Warszawa, s. 447 (ISBN 978-83-7839-469-3), praca ukazała się także w języku angielskim, rosyjskim, chińskim i rumuńskim: Kuda idiot mir. Politiczeskaja ekonomija buduszczewo, Izdatielstwo Magistr, Moskwa 2014, s. 528 (ISBN 978-5-9776-0317-1), Shi Jie Qu Xiang He Fang: Wei Lai De Zheng Zhi Jing Ji Xue, She Hiu Ke Xue Wen Xian Chu Ban She (Social Science Academic Press), Beijing 2015, s. 328, Incotro se indreapta lumea: Economia politica a viitorului, Editura Polirom, Bukareszt 2015, s. 352
- Whither the World: The Political Economy of the Future, Palgrave Macmillan, Houndmills, Basingstoke, Hampshire 2014, vol. I, s. XI + 224 (ISBN 978-1-137-46573-3) & vol. II, s. VI + 226 (ISBN 978-1-137-46576-4)
- Grzegorz W. Kołodko i ćwierćwiecze transformacji, współautor, redakcja naukowa Paweł Kozłowski i Marcin Wojtysiak-Kotlarski, Wydawnictwo Naukowe SCHOLAR, Warszawa 2014, pp. 1279 (ISBN 978-83-7383-690-7)
- Zarządzanie i polityka gospodarcza dla rozwoju (współautor i redakcja naukowa), Poltext, Warszawa 2013, pp. 486 (ISBN 978-83-7561-336-0)
- Management and Economic Policy for Development (współautor i redakcja naukowa), Nova Science Publishers, New York 2014, pp. XII + 358 (ISBN 978-1-63117-606-7)
- Droga do teraz (współautor Paweł Kozłowski), Wydawnictwo Prószyński i S-ka, Warszawa 2014, pp. 312 (ISBN 978-83-7961-055-6)
- Nowy pragmatyzm kontra nowy nacjonalizm (współautor Andrzej K. Koźmiński), Wydawnictwo Prószyński i S-ka, Warszawa 2017, pp. 271 ISBN 978-83-8123-034-6
- Czy Chiny zbawią świat?, Wydawnictwo Prószyński i S-ka, Warszawa 2018, s. 224 ISBN 978-83-8123-262-3
- Strategia dla Polski. Ćwierć wieku później (with Jackiem Tomkiewiczem), Wydawnictwo Naukowe PWN, Warszawa 2019, pp. 472 (ISBN 978-83-01-20621-5)
- China and the Future of Globalization: The Political Economy of China’s Rise, I.B. Tauris, London – New York 2020, pp. 288 ISBN 1-78831-549-9
- Od ekonomicznej teorii do politycznej praktyki, Wydawnictwo Poltext, Warszawa 2020, pp. 361 ISBN 978-83-8175-144-5
- The Quest for Development Success: Bridging Theoretical Reasoning with Economic Practice, Rowman & Littlefield Lexington Books, Lanham-Boulder-New York-London 2021, pp. XII + 253 ISBN 978-1-7936-4255-4
- Chinism and New Pragmatism：How China’s Development Success and Innovative Economic Thinking Contribute to the Global Development, Prunus Press USA, 2022, pp. 115 ISBN 978-1-61612-1518
- Political Economy of New Pragmatism: Implications of Irreversible Globalization, Springer Studies in Alternative Economics, 2022, pp. 496, 978-3-03112-2620
- Wojna i pokój, Wydawnictwo Naukowe PWN, 2022, pp. 272 ISBN 978-8-30122-5902
- Global Consequences of Russia's Invasion of Ukraine: The Economics and Politics of the Second Cold War. Springer Nature, 2023, pp. 174, ISBN 978-3-031-24262-5.
- Trumps zweite Amtszeit: Globale Machtverschiebungen, internationale Politik und eine neue Weltordnung, Springer Sachbuch, 2025, PP. X + 190, ISBN 978-3-032-02942-3.

== See also ==
- New Pragmatism
