= Eustachy Sapieha =

Polish aristocrat and politician

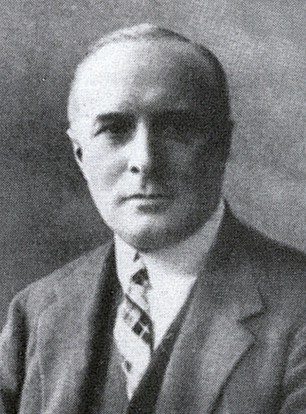
- Eustachy Sapieha

Minister of Foreign Affairs of Poland
- In office 23 June 1920 – 20 May 1921
- Preceded by: Stanisław Patek
- Succeeded by: Jan Dąbski (acting)

Member of the Sejm
- In office 1928–1929

Personal details
- Born: 2 August 1881 Biłka Szlachecka, Austria-Hungary
- Died: 20 February 1963 (aged 81) Nairobi, Kenya
- Party: Nonpartisan
- Occupation: Politician

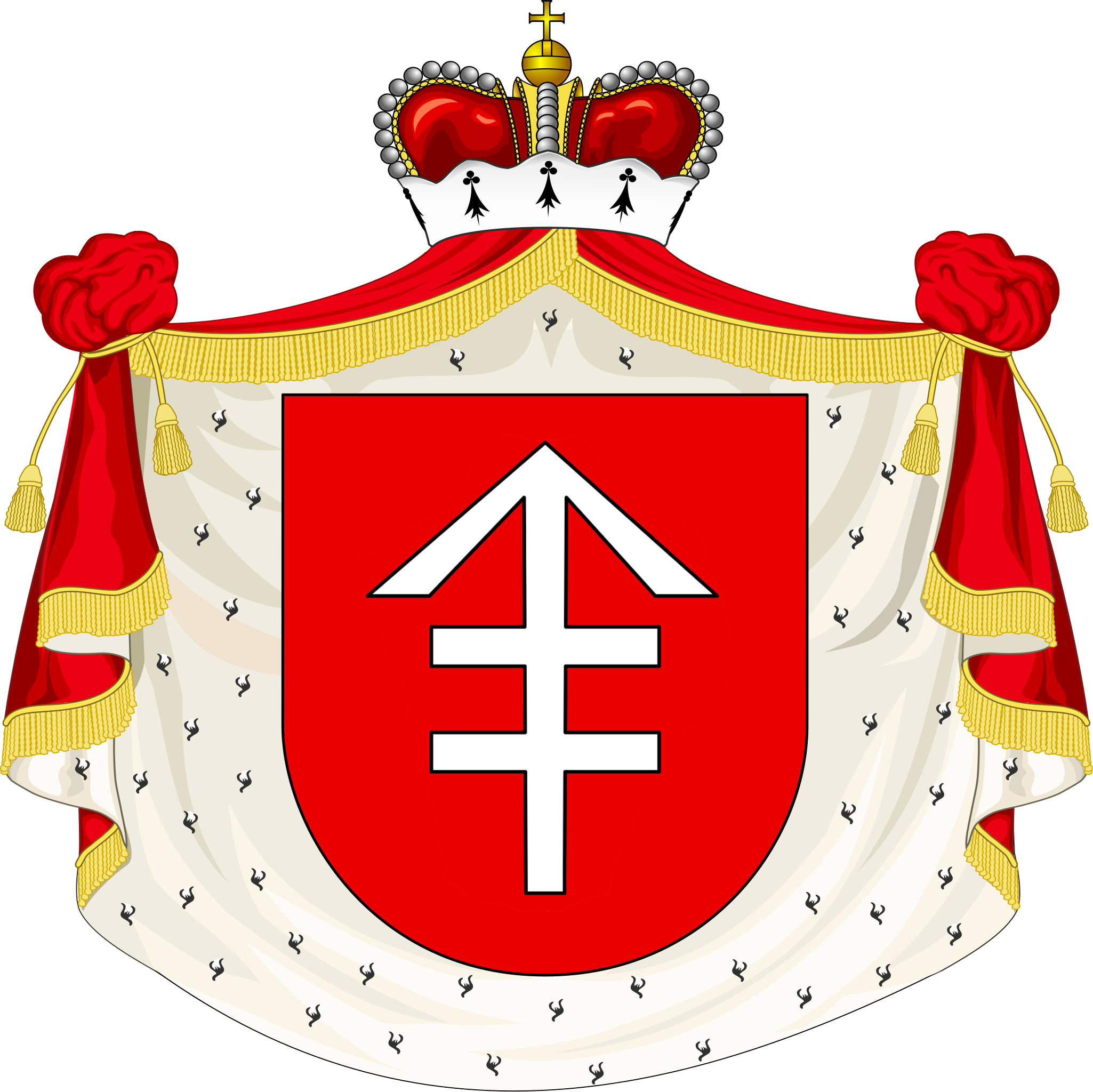
Coat of arms of Sapieha family

Eustachy Kajetan Sapieha (2 August 1881 – 20 February 1963) was a Polish nobleman, prince of the Sapieha family, politician, Polish Minister of Foreign Affairs, and deputy to the Polish parliament (Sejm).

== Politics ==
In 1900–04, he studied forestry in Zurich and afterwards earned a degree as an engineer. He was a conservative activist from Kresy, and worked with the German installed Regency Council and Józef Piłsudski during the First World War. In 1917 he unsuccessfully negotiated with the Polish National Committee. Afterwards, disappointed with Piłsudski's leftist policies, he was an organizer of the failed 1919 coup d'état; despite that, he subsequently worked with Piłsudski and supported him. During the Polish-Soviet War, he served in the cavalry.

== Diplomatic career ==
On 16 June 1919, Sapieha was delegated as the ambassador of Poland to the United Kingdom. On 4 June 1920 he and Erazm Piltz, representing the Polish government, signed the Treaty of Trianon in Paris.

In 1920, he was chosen by Prime Minister Władysław Grabski to be Minister of Foreign Affairs. Although he successfully negotiated several agreements with Western powers, he was faced with the delicate situation over the plebiscites in Upper Silesia. On 24 March 1921 the British Embassy at Warsaw wrote to Earl Curzon in London to say that he had just called upon Prince Sapieha whom he found "very depressed at the result of voting in Upper Silesia, which has on the whole turned out far worse than the Polish Government had anticipated...He agreed with me that the victory reports in the newspapers were foolish and any public rejoicing regrettable." His negotiations over federation with Lithuania also failed and, faced with criticism from the National Democrats, he resigned his post later in the year.

== Parliament and WWII ==
In 1928–29 he was a Sejm deputy from the Nonpartisan Bloc for Cooperation with the Government. After the Soviet invasion of Poland in 1939 he was arrested by the Soviets and imprisoned in the Lubyanka prison. After the Sikorski-Mayski Agreement, he joined Anders' Army. In 1941 he travelled to Kenya. He did not return to post-war communist Poland, and remained in Nairobi.

In 1956 he was awarded the Order of the White Eagle by the Polish government in exile.
