= Mateusz Szczurek =

Polish economist and politician

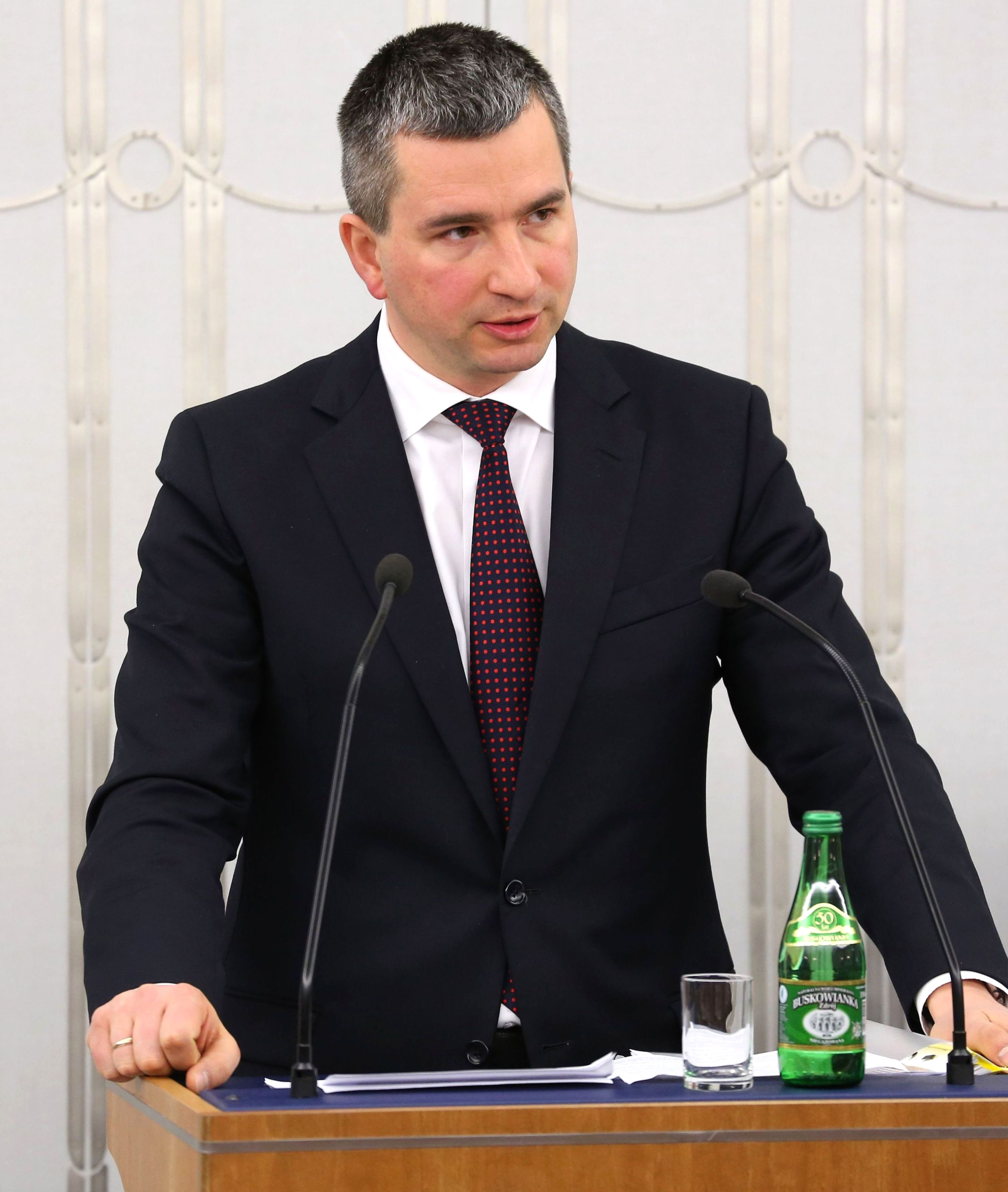

Minister of Finance of Poland
- In office 27 November 2013 – 16 November 2015
- Prime Minister: Donald Tusk; Ewa Kopacz
- Preceded by: Jacek Rostowski
- Succeeded by: Paweł Szałamacha

Personal details
- Born: 11 August 1975 (age 51)
- Party: Civic Platform
- Education: University of Warsaw; Columbia University; University of Sussex

Mateusz Szczurek (born 11 August 1975) is a Polish economist and politician. He was the Polish Minister of Finance in the governments of successive prime ministers Donald Tusk and Ewa Kopacz from 2013 to 2015.

== Education ==
Szczurek studied at the University of Warsaw and University of Sussex where in 1998 he obtained a master's degree, and in 2005 a PhD. He wrote his Masters thesis on "Chaos and non-linearity in Foreign Exchange Markets."

== Career in the private sector ==
In 1997 Szczurek was an economist for ING Bank. In 2011 he became the Chief Economist of ING Group for Central Europe and Eastern Europe. He was chief (2003-2005) and co-founder Towarzystwo Absolwentów Uniwersytetów Brytyjskich (Alumni Association of British Universities). He is a member of Association of Polish Economists.

== Political career ==
On 27 November 2013, the President of Poland appointed Szczurek as Minister of Finance.

During his time in office, Szczurek phased out Poland's flexible credit line (FCL) with the International Monetary Fund (IMF).

In 2014, Szczurek called for the creation of a European Fund for Investments – a special-purpose vehicle under the umbrella of the European Investment Bank – that would be able to finance, through leveraging its own capital, 700 billion euros (US$906.4 billion) worth of investment, to revive the European economy. In 2015, he announced that Polish state development bank BGK and its investment vehicle PIR would invest up to 8 billion euros ($8.5 billion) in projects linked to the European Fund for Strategic Investments (EFSI).

Also in 2015, Szczurek put aside funds the country’s budget for the repatriation – including housing, Polish language lessons and professional training – of tens of thousands of ethnic Poles living in Kazakhstan, Ukraine and other former Soviet republics.

== Life after politics ==
Since leaving office, Szczurek has been teaching public finance and international economics at University of Warsaw. He also serves as Associate Director, Lead Regional Economist in the European Bank for Reconstruction and Development (EBRD), monitoring structural reforms and policy dialogue in Central Europe and the Baltics region.

In October 2016, Szczurek was appointed to the five-member European Fiscal Board, an independent advisory board of the European Commission on fiscal matters.

In 2026, he was named Director of the European Department at the International Monetary Fund.

== Other activities ==
- European Bank for Reconstruction and Development (EBRD), Ex-Officio Member of the Board of Governors (2013–2015)
- European Investment Bank (EIB), Ex-Officio Member of the Board of Governors (2013–2015)

== Recognition ==
Szczurek was named European Finance Minister of the Year in January 2015 by The Banker magazine., and Finance Minister of the Year Central & Eastern Europe 2014 by Emerging Markets magazine.

== Personal life ==
Szczurek has five children.

Political offices
Preceded by Jacek Rostowski	Minister of Finance; 2013–2015	Succeeded by Paweł Szałamacha
