= Post-Communist Economies =

- Discipline: Economics
- Language: English
- Edited by: Richard Connolly

Publication details
- Former name(s): Communist Economies, Communist Economies and Economic Transformation
- History: 1989–present
- Publisher: Taylor & Francis
- Frequency: Quarterly
- Impact factor: 0.492 (2014)

Standard abbreviations
- ISO 4: Post-Communist Econ.

Indexing
- CODEN: PCECF8
- ISSN: 1463-1377 (print); 1465-3958 (web)
- LCCN: sn99030020
- OCLC no.: 884568959

Links
- Journal homepage; Online access; Online archive

Post-Communist Economies is a quarterly peer-reviewed academic journal covering economics in post-communist countries. It was established in 1989 as Communist Economies and renamed as Communist Economies and Economic Transformation in 1991, before obtaining its current name in 1999. It covers economic institutions, policies, and performance of ex-communist countries. The geographic focus of the journal is mainly on European post-communist economies, including countries of the former Soviet Union, but papers on Mongolia, China, and Vietnam are also published.

== Abstracting and indexing ==
The journal is abstracted and indexed in:

- Current Contents/Behavioral Sciences
- Sage Human Resources Abstracts
- Sage Public Administration Abstracts
- Scopus
- Social Sciences Citation Index

According to the Journal Citation Reports, the journal has a 2014 impact factor of 0.492.
