= Paweł Wojciechowski (economist) =

Polish economist

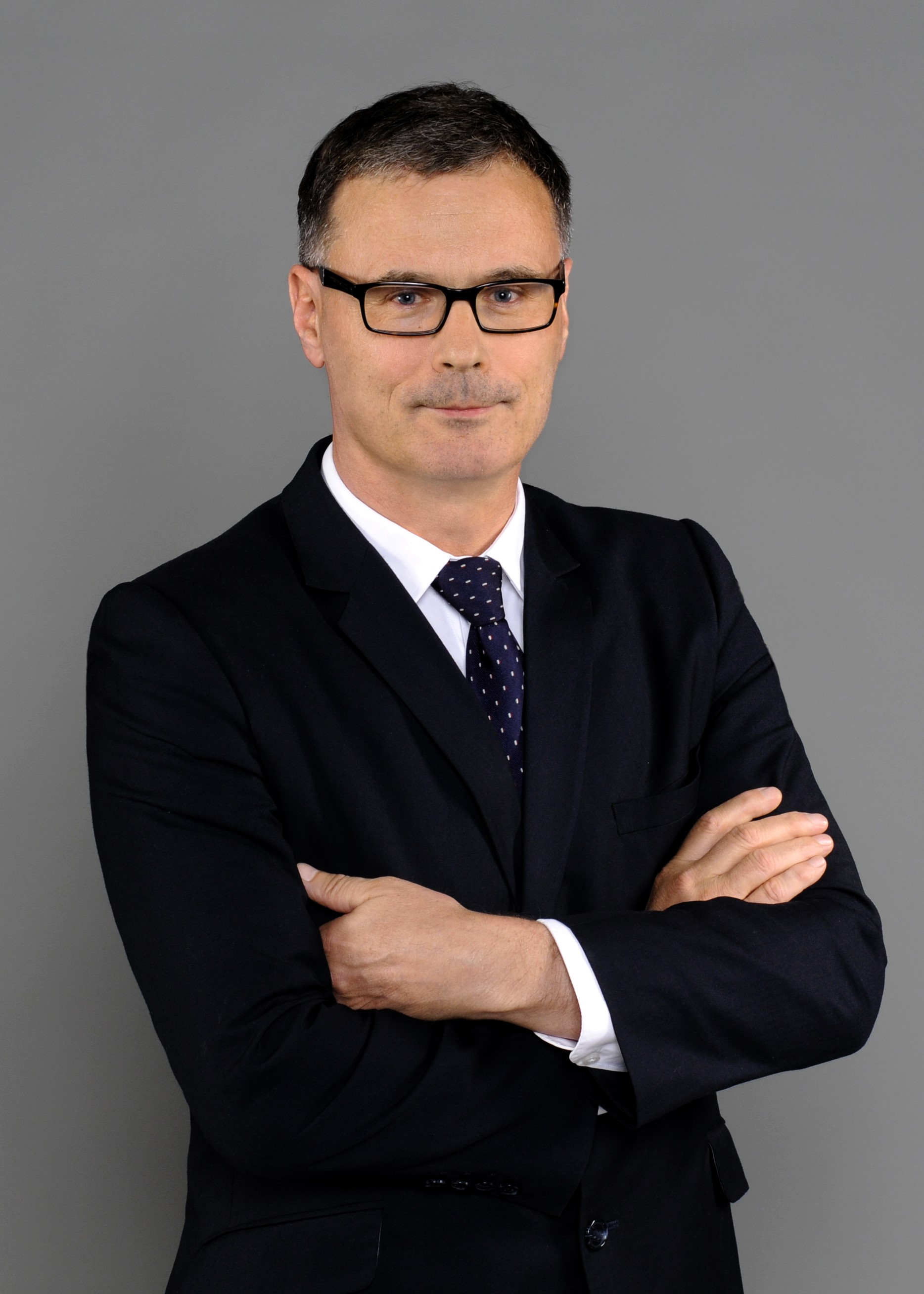

4th Poland Ambassador to the Organisation for Economic Co-operation and Development
- In office 11 August 2010 – August 2014
- Preceded by: Jan Woroniecki
- Succeeded by: Jakub Wiśniewski

Personal details
- Born: 3 January 1960 (age 66) Warsaw, Poland
- Spouse: Sabina
- Children: 3 sons
- Education: Main School of Planning and Statistics
- Profession: economist, diplomat

Paweł Wojciechowski (born 3 January 1960) is a Polish economist.

== Life ==
He graduated from the Foreign Trade Faculty of the Main School of Planning and Statistics in 1983. In 1986 he graduated with a bachelor's degree in Economics from John Carroll University, Ohio in the United States.

Paweł Wojciechowski has academic, corporate and government experiences. While staying in Cleveland between 1983 and 1991, he worked as an analyst at the Center for Regional Economic Issues and lectured in statistics at John Carroll University.

After returning to Warsaw, from 1992 to 1995, he advised the Polish government on privatisation and capital market development, including work for UNDP, the Polish Ministry of Privatisation and KPMG/USAID.

From 1995 to 2005, he worked as CEO of three financial institutions: Polish Fund Management Group Sp. z o.o. – Polish Development Bank S.A. division (1995–1996); PBK ATUT TFI S.A. – Investment Fund Company (1996–1999); and PTE Allianz Poland S.A. – Allianz Pension Fund (1999–2005).

In June 2006 Paweł Wojciechowski was entrusted with the position of Minister of Finance of Poland, earlier serving as economic advisor to the Prime Minister Kazimierz Marcinkiewicz. After the change of government, he became Chief Economist of the Polish Institute of Directors, and then he headed the Polish Information and Foreign Investment Agency for two years.

From March 2009, until his nomination as Permanent Representative of Poland to the OECD, Paweł Wojciechowski was Undersecretary of State at the Ministry of Foreign Affairs in Poland, responsible for economic cooperation and development.

On 11 August 2010, Paweł Wojciechowski took up his duties as Ambassador, Permanent Representative of Poland to the Organisation for Economic Co-operation and Development.

In 2014, after his tenure as an Ambassador, Paweł Wojciechowski became the Chief Economist of the Polish Social Insurance Institution (ZUS). He is also the European Coordinator for the TEN-T Rhine-Alpine Corridor, since May 2015.
