= Ministry of Investment and Economic Development =

Former government ministry of Poland

Ministry of Investment and Economic Development of the Polish Republic
- Ministerstwo Przedsiębiorczości i Technologii; Rzeczypospolitej Polskiej
- Official governmental wall plaque

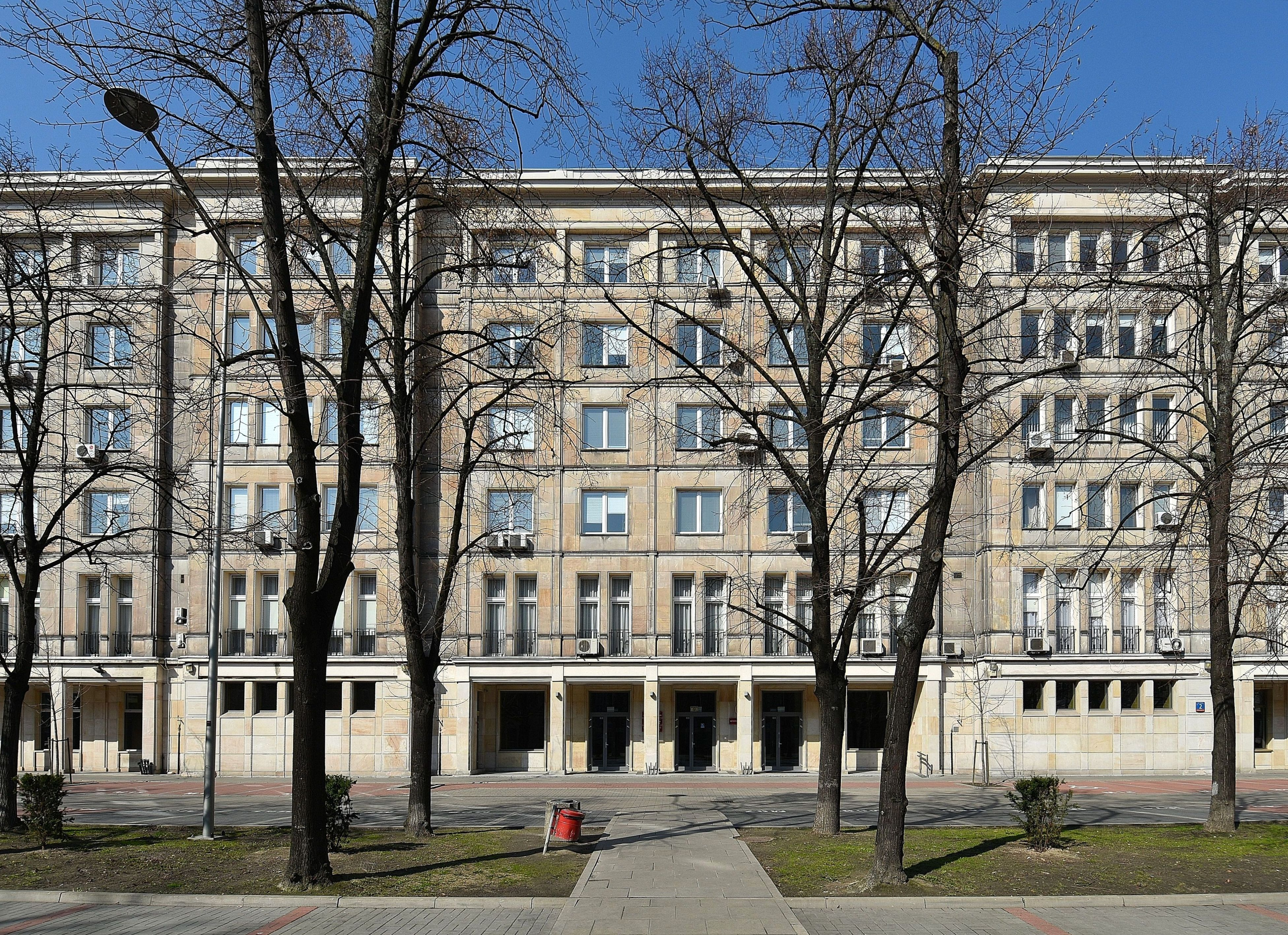

Agency overview
- Preceding agency: Ministry of Development
- Headquarters: Warsaw
- Agency executive: Jerzy Kwieciński, Minister of Infrastructure
- Parent agency: Council of Ministers

The Ministry of Investment and Economic Development (Polish: Ministerstwo Inwestycji i Rozwoju) was an agency of the government of Poland. The ministry was headquartered in Warsaw and was formed from the Ministry of Development in 2018. Jerzy Kwieciński was the first and only Minister of Investment and Economic Development, serving from 9 January 2018 to 15 November 2019. It was succeeded by the Ministry of Funds and Regional Policy.

== List of ministers ==
Portrait	Name	Party	Term of office		Prime Minister (cabinet)
	Jerzy Kwieciński	Independent	9 January 2018	15 November 2019	Mateusz Morawiecki (Morawiecki)
