= Jakub Karnowski =

Polish economist and corporate executive

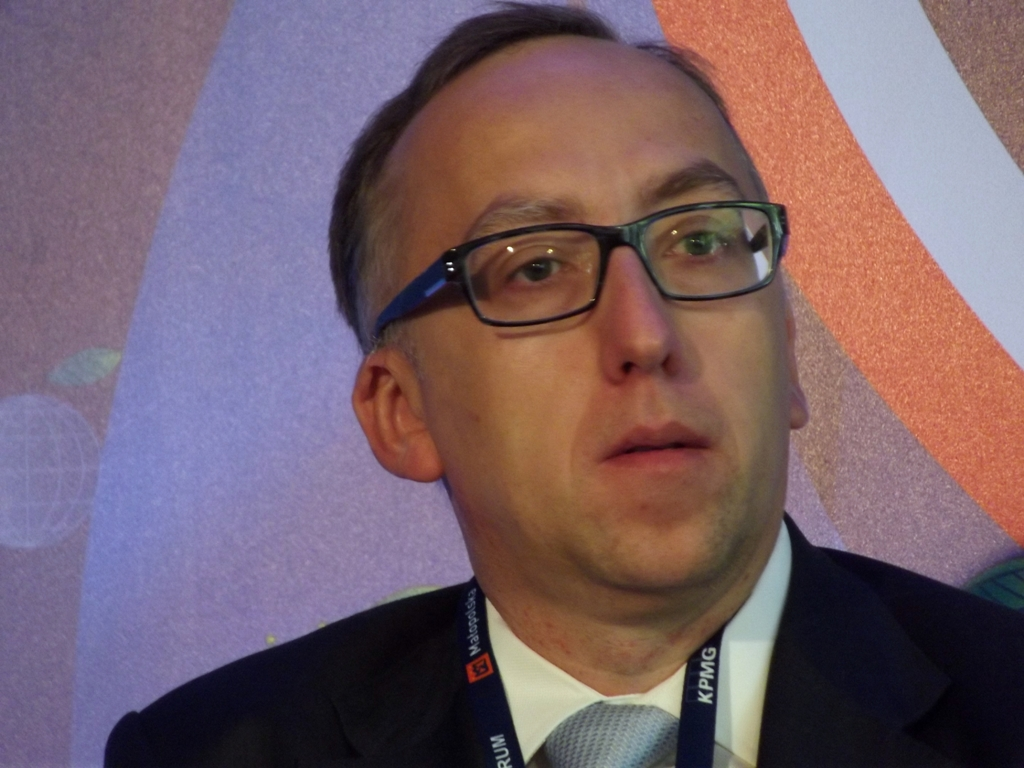
- Karnowski in 2013
- Born: 1974 (age 51–52)
- Education: SGH Warsaw School of Economics (PhD); University of Minnesota (MBA)
- Occupations: Economist, banker and corporate executive
- Years active: 1995–present
- Employer: KredoBank
- Known for: President of Polish State Railways (2012–2015)
- Title: President of the management board
- Term: 2025–present

Jakub Karnowski (born 1974) is a Polish economist, banker and corporate executive. Since March 2025, he has been president of the management board of KredoBank, a Ukrainian bank owned by Poland's PKO Bank Polski. He previously served as president of Polish State Railways (PKP) from 2012 to 2015, president of the asset-management company PKO TFI from 2008 to 2012, and Poland's alternate executive director at the World Bank Group from 2003 to 2008.

Karnowski has also held supervisory positions at Ukrainian state-owned enterprises, including Ukrposhta and Ukrainian Railways. He is an adjunct professor and head of the Liberal Economics Unit at the SGH Warsaw School of Economics.

== Early life and education ==
Karnowski was born in 1974. He graduated in economics from the SGH Warsaw School of Economics and received an MBA from the Carlson School of Management and the Humphrey School of Public Affairs at the University of Minnesota in 1997. He was a Margaret Thatcher Foundation fellow at the London School of Economics and completed a public-sector negotiations programme at the Harvard Kennedy School. He received a doctorate in economics from SGH in 2004 and became a Chartered Financial Analyst charterholder in 2007.

== Career ==
=== Public administration and finance ===
From 1997 to 2000, Karnowski worked at the Polish Ministry of Finance as an adviser, personal secretary and head of the political cabinet of finance minister Leszek Balcerowicz. He subsequently worked at the National Bank of Poland, where he advised the governor and directed the foreign department. Between 2003 and 2008, he represented Poland as an alternate executive director at the World Bank Group in Washington, D.C.

In 2008, Karnowski became president of PKO TFI, the investment-fund subsidiary of PKO Bank Polski. He remained in the position until 2012, when he was appointed president of Polish State Railways and head of the PKP Group.

=== Polish State Railways ===
Karnowski led Polish State Railways from 2012 until his resignation in November 2015. His tenure included governance reforms, asset sales and the stock-market flotation of PKP Cargo, as well as the launch of Pendolino services by PKP Intercity. An International Monetary Fund review of state-owned enterprises later described the 2012 appointment of a new management team as the start of a programme that introduced management-by-objectives, centralised internal audit and greater use of external experts. The review linked the programme to the listing of PKP Cargo, sales of non-core subsidiaries, reduced employment and debt, and improved productivity.

Among the transactions completed during this period were the sale of PKP Energetyka for PLN 1.41 billion and the divestment of the telecommunications operator TK Telekom. The restructuring was accompanied by disputes with railway trade unions and criticism over the pace and social effects of the changes.

=== Later work and Ukraine ===
From 2016 to 2019, Karnowski was chief executive of the industrial investment company Luma Investment. He also served on corporate supervisory boards in Poland, including those of HSBC Bank Polska and the insurance group PZU.

Karnowski joined the supervisory board of Ukrposhta, Ukraine's national postal operator, in 2018 and later chaired it. From 2021 to 2024, he was an independent member of the supervisory board of Ukrainian Railways.

Karnowski joined Kredobank as first deputy president of its management board in August 2024. Following approval by the National Bank of Ukraine, the bank's supervisory board appointed him president of the management board with effect from 1 March 2025.

== Academic work ==
Karnowski has taught at SGH since 1996 and has headed its Liberal Economics Unit since 2022. His research and policy work has covered public finance, state-owned enterprises, capital markets and the economic reconstruction and European integration of Ukraine. He has also supervised an SGH student research group devoted to Ukraine's post-war reconstruction.

== Legal proceedings ==
In 2019, Polish prosecutors charged Karnowski and several former PKP Cargo executives with mismanagement in connection with the company's acquisition of the Czech freight operator AWT. Karnowski denied wrongdoing. In July 2024, the Regional Prosecutor's Office in Lublin withdrew the indictment after re-examining the evidence. The Regional Court in Warsaw discontinued the case in October 2024.

== Selected publications ==
- Beksiak, Janusz; Ciżkowicz, Magda; Karnowski, Jakub (2013). Falowanie aktywności gospodarczej: przypadek Polski [Fluctuations in economic activity: the case of Poland] (in Polish). Warsaw: C.H. Beck. ISBN 978-83-255-5401-9.
- Karnowski, Jakub; Rzońca, Andrzej (2023). "Should Poland join the euro area? The challenge of the boom-bust cycle". Argumenta Oeconomica (1): 245–271. doi:10.15611/aoe.2023.1.11.
- Karnowski, Jakub (2023). Odbudowa gospodarki i integracja europejska Ukrainy: propozycje reform [Economic reconstruction and European integration of Ukraine: reform proposals] (PDF) (in Polish). Warsaw: SGH Publishing House. ISBN 978-83-8030-640-0.
- Jurałowicz, Maksymilian; Karnowski, Jakub; Rzońca, Andrzej (2024). "Sidestepping the sovereign debt trap? The case of Poland". Eastern European Economics. doi:10.1080/00128775.2024.2409241.
