= Krzysztof Tchórzewski =

Polish engineer and politician

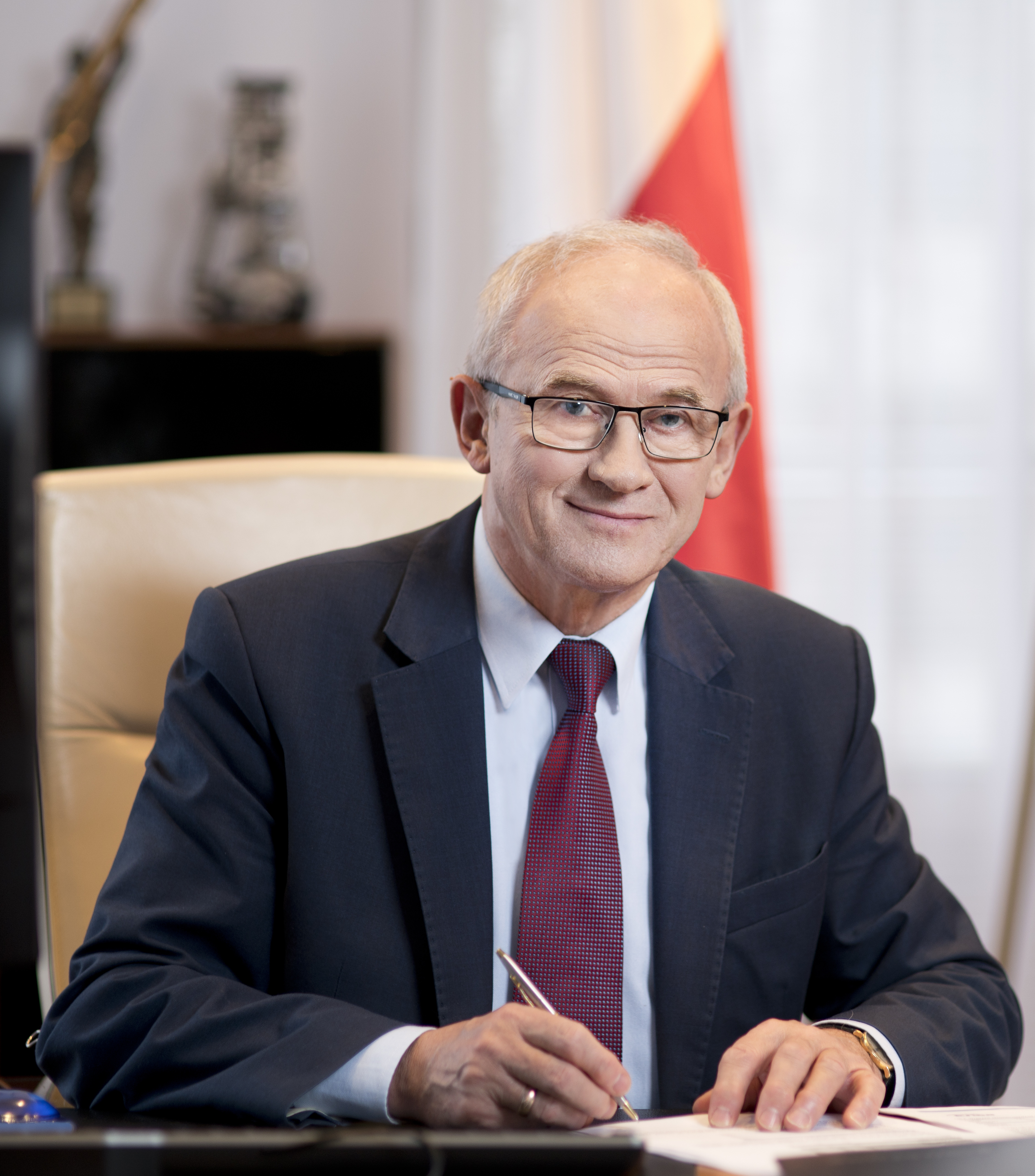

Minister of Energy
- Incumbent
- Assumed office 1 December 2015
- President: Andrzej Duda
- Prime Minister: Beata Szydło; Mateusz Morawiecki
- Preceded by: Position established Jan Szlachta (As Minister of Mining and Energy)

Member of the Sejm
- Incumbent
- Assumed office 25 September 2005
- Constituency: 18 – Siedlce

Personal details
- Born: 19 May 1950 (age 76) Rzążew
- Party: Law and Justice
- Education: Warsaw University of Technology
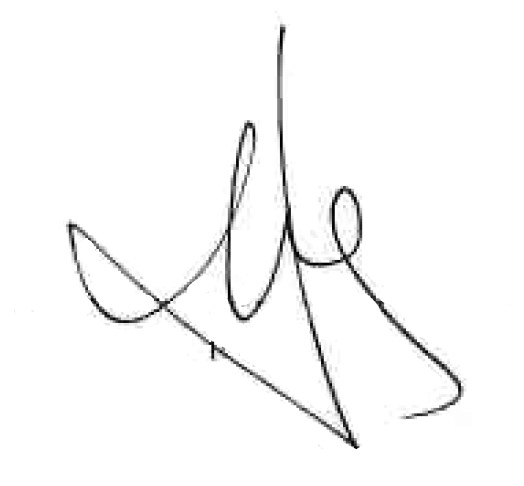
- Signature

Krzysztof Józef Tchórzewski (born 19 May 1950) is a Polish engineer and politician. He serves as the Minister of Energy in the cabinet of Beata Szydło (since 1 December 2015). Prior to this, Tchórzewski was a minister without portfolio.

== Life and career ==
Tchórzewski was born Rzążew. In the 1980s, he was part of the anti-communist opposition. He was the chairman of the Siedlce branch of the Solidarity from 1981. From 1990 to 1992 he was the provincial governor of the Siedlce Voivodeship. He held various significant positions in the public and private sectors, including as Deputy Transport Minister (1997-2001), Deputy Economy Minister (2005), and PKP Energetyka Economic Director (2002).

He was elected to the Sejm on 25 September 2005, polling 8516 votes in 18 Siedlce district as a candidate on the Law and Justice list. He was also a member of Sejm 1991–1993 and Sejm 1997–2001. In 1974 he graduated from the Faculty of Electrical Engineering at the Warsaw University of Technology.

== Personal life ==
Tchórzewski has four children with his wife Teresa, including Karol, a councilman of the Mazovian Regional Council. Karol also ran as the PiS candidate for the President of Siedlec in 2018.

== Honours ==
Tchórzewski has been awarded the Silver Cross of Merit (1987), the Knight's Cross of the Order of Polonia Restituta (2001), and the Officer's Cross of the Order of Polonia Restituta (2005).

== See also ==
- Members of Polish Sejm 2005-2007
