= Andrzej Wach =

Polish businessman

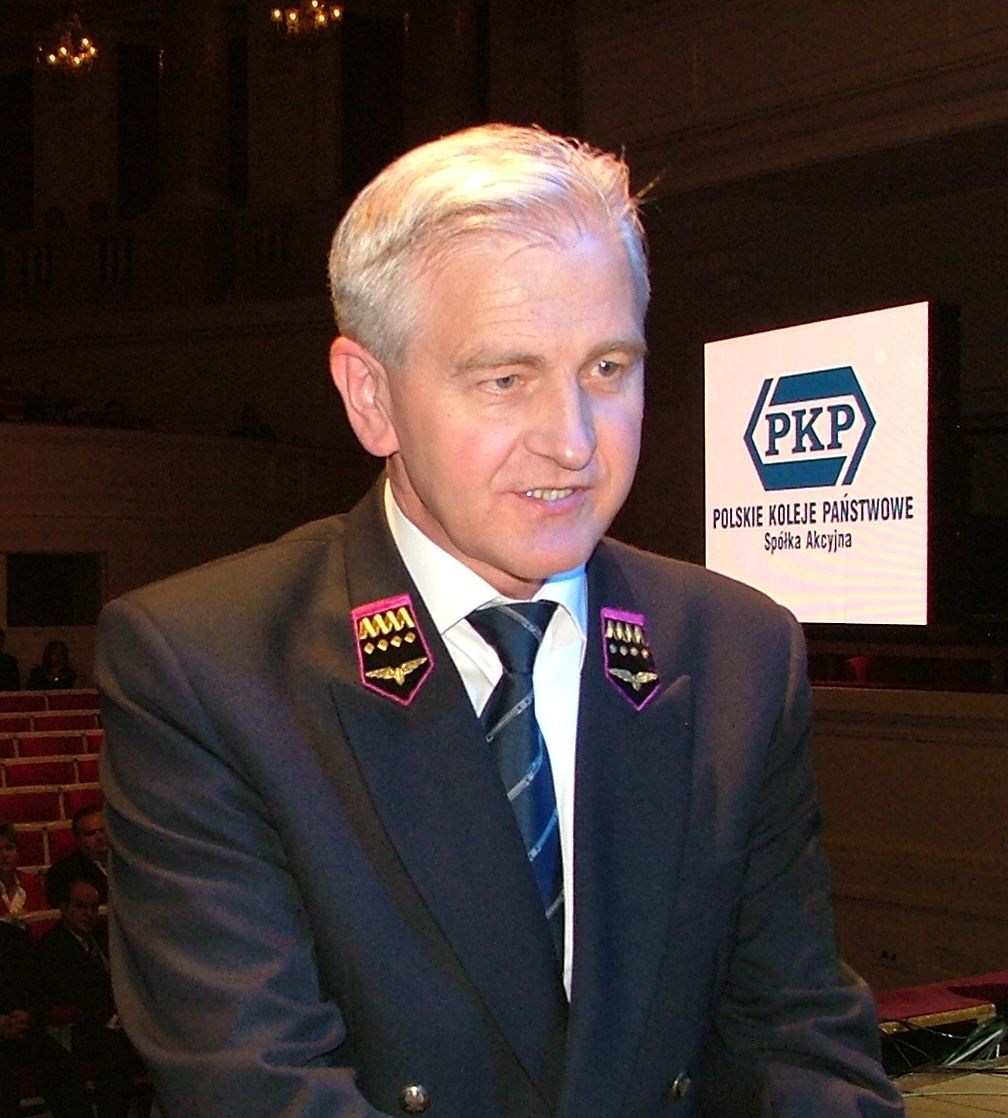
Andrzej Wach

Andrzej Wach is the President of Polskie Koleje Państwowe S.A. (Polish State Railways). He replaced the previous president, Macieja Męclewskiego, in September 2004. He has worked for Polish railways since 1980, and previously held the position of Chairman at PKP Energetyka.

He received an Electrotechnics degree from Politechnika Warszawska (Warsaw University of Technology) and a degree of Law and Administration from Uniwersytet Warszawski (Warsaw University).

Preceded by Maciej Męclewski	PKP President since September 22, 2004	Succeeded by Maria Wasiak
Preceded by ???	PKP Energetyka chairman 1987 - September 22, 2004	Succeeded by Tadeusz Skobel
Preceded by Maria Wasiak	Polregio Supervisory Board chairman 2004-2007	Succeeded by None
