= Wasiak =

Wasiak is a surname. Notable people with the surname include:

- Maria Wasiak (born 1960), Polish businesswoman
- Stan Wasiak (1920–1992), American baseball player and manager

== See also ==
- Wasick
