= Maria Wasiak =

Polish businessman and politician

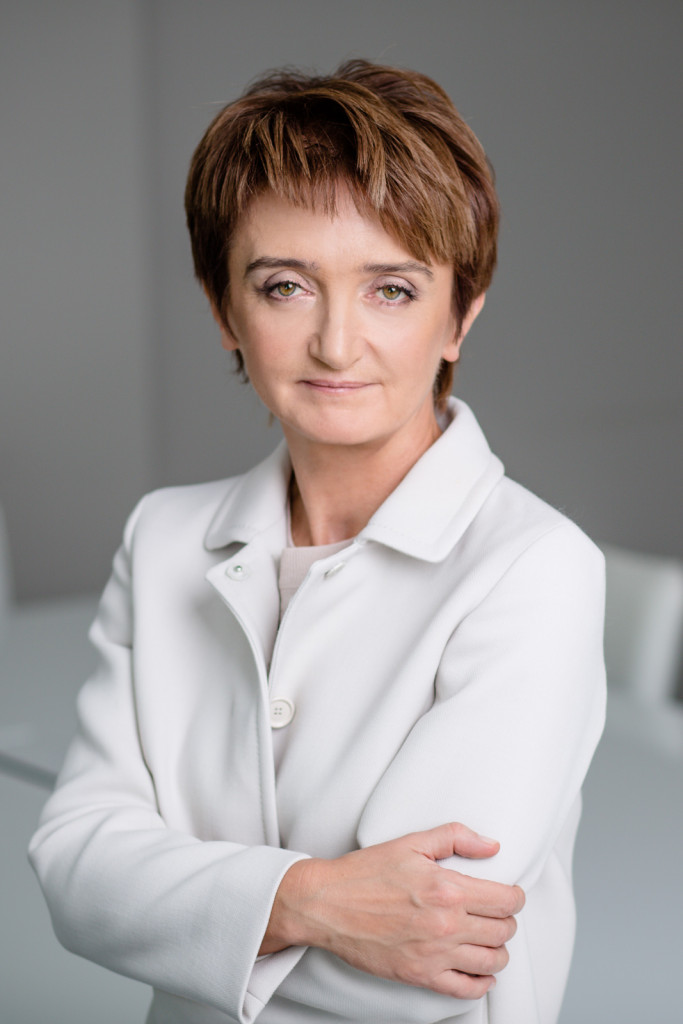

Minister of Infrastructure and Development
- In office 22 September 2014 – 16 November 2015
- Prime Minister: Ewa Kopacz
- Preceded by: Elżbieta Bieńkowska
- Succeeded by: Andrzej Adamczyk

President of Polish State Railways
- In office 19 May 2011 – 5 April 2012
- Preceded by: Maciej Męclewski
- Succeeded by: Jakub Karnowski

Personal details
- Born: 6 July 1960 (age 65) Radom, Poland

Maria Wasiak (born 6 July 1960, in Radom) is a Polish politician who served as Minister of Infrastructure and Development of Poland and the President of Polish State Railways.

== Biography ==
Maria Wasiak was born in Radom and lived and studied there until matriculating at the University of Warsaw where she studied law. In 1990 her application to become a legal counsellor (solicitor) was approved. In 1994 Wasiak became a founding member of the Democratic Union, from which she later went on to head the regional branch of the Freedom Union party. She stayed in her position as leader of the party's regional branch until 1997. Wasiak is a graduate of the Poznań University of Economics's business school.

In 1998 Maria Wasiak became the final deputy-voivode of the Radom Voivodeship, before that region's amalgamation with others to form the Masovian Voivodeship as part of the Polish territorial divisions reforms in 1999.

Since leaving the government Wasiak has held a number of fully managerial positions in the structures of the Polish State Railways, among others she has been Project Director (2000–2001), chairman of the board of PKP Przeowzy Regionalne (2001–2002), Director of the Office of Privatization and the executive director of promotion and social affairs for PKP.

Since 30 December 2010 when Andrzej Wach resigned from the post of President of PKP SA, Wasiak has been serving as the company's chairperson and CEO. Since 19 May 2011 Wasiak has been president of PKP SA. On 22 September 2014 she was officially appointed the Minister of Infrastructure and Development. She remained in government until the 2015 election. In 2016 she was appointed vice president of Bydgoszcz.

Preceded by Maciej Męclewski	PKP President; 19 May 2011 – 5 April 2012	Succeeded by Jakub Karnowski
Preceded by Elżbieta Bieńkowska	Minister of Infrastructure and Development of Poland; 2014–2015	Succeeded by Andrzej Adamczyk
