= Michał Chyczewski =

Polish bureaucrat

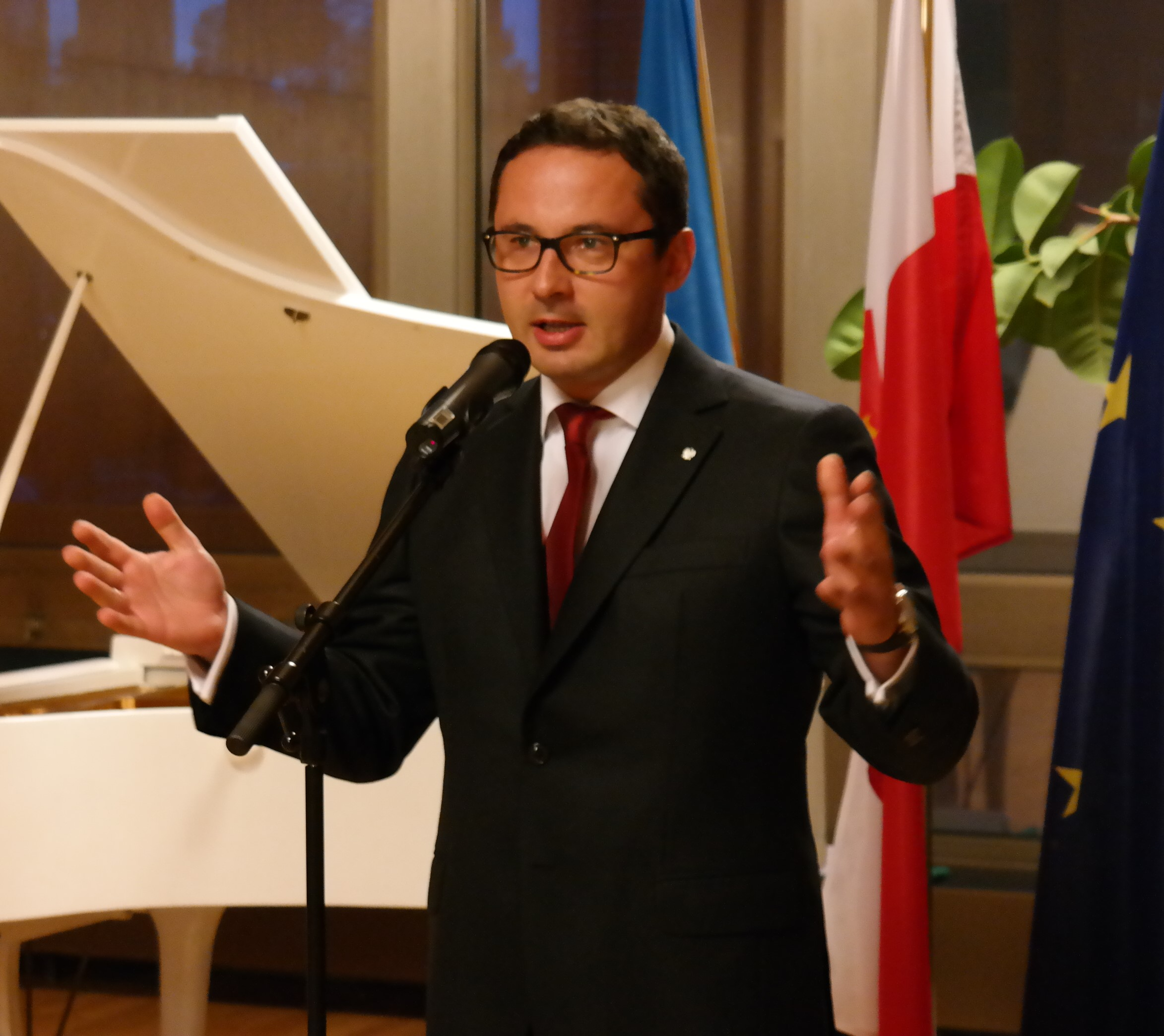
Michał Chyczewski

Michał Jan Chyczewski (born 21 March 1980 in Białystok) is a Polish manager, financier and government official.

== Career ==
Michał Chyczewski is a graduate of Warsaw School of Economics (quantitative methods in economics and information systems) and MBA studies of University of St. Gallen. His professional career began at Arthur Andersen Poland, followed by becoming an economist at Bank BPH.

On November 20, 2007 Chyczewski became an undersecretary of the Ministry of State Treasury of the Republic of Poland. Having worked there for a year and a half, he was responsible for supervising financial institutions. On June 13, 2015 Chyczewski became the Polish Permanent Representative to the World Trade Organization in Geneve.

Chyczewski is also a former vice-CEO of Private Equity Managers, a WSE-listed company dealing with private equity and venture capital funds, and an investment partner of MCI Management. He also held positions of the first vice-CEO of the Ukrainian KredoBank of the PKO Bank Polski capital group, and a managing director at Bank Gospodarstwa Krajowego.

On June 14, 2017 the supervisory board of Alior Bank appointed him a member and acting president of the managing board. Michal Chyczewski took up the position on June 29, 2017.
