= Ministry of Regional Development (Poland) =

- Ministerstwo Rozwoju Regionalnego
- Official governmental wall plaque

- Ministerial logotype

Agency overview
- Formed: 31 October 2005
- Dissolved: 27 November 2013
- Superseding agency: Ministry of Infrastructure and Development
- Headquarters: ul. Wspólna 2/4, Warsaw
- Parent agency: Council of Ministers
- Website: www.mrr.gov.pl

The Ministry of Regional Development (Polish: Ministerstwo Rozwoju Regionalnego) was a ministerial department within the government of Poland. The ministry was created under the premiership of Kazimierz Marcinkiewicz on 31 October 2005, having its functions devolved from the previous Ministry of Economy and Labour. The department was merged with the Ministry of Transport, Construction and Marine Economy in November 2013 under Prime Minister Donald Tusk, creating the Ministry of Infrastructure and Development.

== Functions ==
The Ministry of Regional Development responsibilities included the coordination of policy between central and local government, drafting national strategies concerning regional economic development, and overseeing the use of European Union structural and cohesion funds.

== List of ministers ==
Portrait	Name (Born-Died)	Party	Term of Office		Prime Minister (Cabinet)
	Grażyna Gęsicka (1951-2010)	Law and Justice	31 October 2005	7 September 2007	Kazimierz Marcinkiewicz (Marcinkiewicz); Jarosław Kaczyński (Kaczyński)
	Jarosław Kaczyński (acting) (1949-)	Law and Justice	7 September 2007	11 September 2007	Jarosław Kaczyński (Kaczyński)
	Grażyna Gęsicka (1951-2010)	Law and Justice	11 September 2007	16 November 2007	Jarosław Kaczyński (Kaczyński)
	Elżbieta Bieńkowska (1964-)	Independent (2007-2011); Civic Platform (2011-2013)	16 November 2007	27 November 2013	Donald Tusk (Tusk I-Tusk II)
