= Przemyślanin =

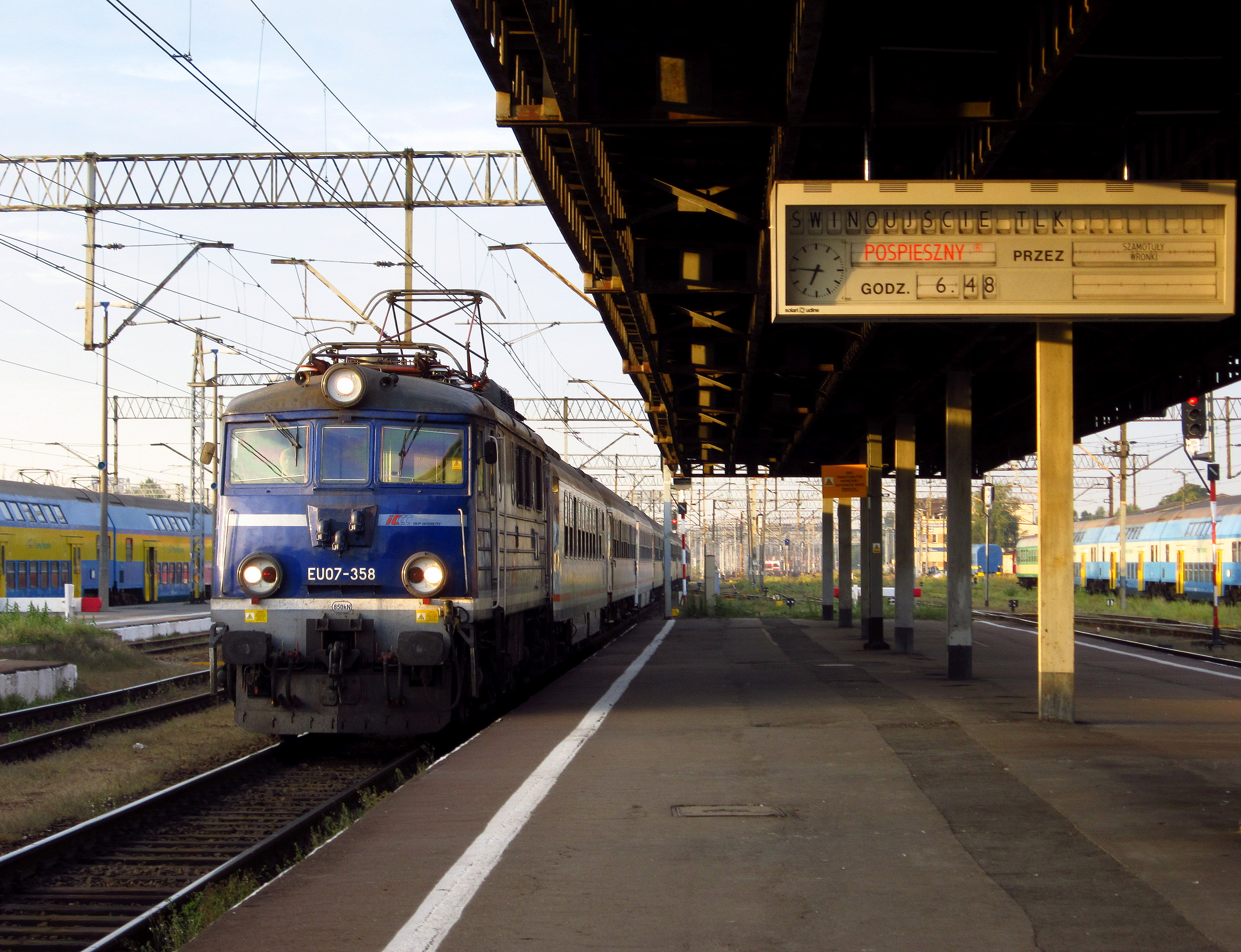
An EU07 locomotive hauling a Przemyślanin service in August 2012

Przemyślanin is an overnight train (13.5 hrs needed to complete the route at an average speed of 73 km/h) operated by PKP Intercity, a division of the Polish State Railways, which runs across the whole of Poland, from the southeastern station of Przemyśl Główny, to Świnoujście, located in the extreme northwestern corner of the country. The rail distance between these locations is 990 kilometers, making Przemyślanin the longest train route within Poland's borders.

== Route ==
- Przemyśl Główny,
- Przemyśl Zasanie,
- Jarosław,
- Rzeszów,
- Dębica,
- Tarnów,
- Bochnia,
- Kraków Płaszów,
- Kraków Główny,
- Trzebinia,
- Jaworzno-Szczakowa,
- Mysłowice,
- Katowice,
- Zabrze,
- Gliwice,
- Kędzierzyn-Koźle,
- Opole Główne,
- Wrocław Główny,
- Rawicz,
- Leszno,
- Poznań Główny,
- Wronki,
- Krzyż,
- Choszczno,
- Stargard,
- Szczecin Dąbie,
- Szczecin Główny,
- Goleniów
- Międzyzdroje
- Świnoujście.
