= TK Telekom =

Polish telecommunications company

TK Telekom Sp. z o.o. ex-Telekomunikacja Kolejowa Sp. z o.o.
- Company type: Ltd.
- Industry: Rail transport
- Founded: 2001
- Headquarters: Warsaw, Poland
- Key people: Zdzisław Gaca (President and CEO); Katarzyna Iwuć (Chairwoman of the supervisory board)
- Number of employees: 1,500 (2011)
- Website: /www.netia.pl/pl/transport/o-tk-telekom

TK Telekom (formerly Telekomunikacja Kolejowa) is a Polish telecommunications company, operated jointly by Netia and the PKP Group.

It is responsible for telecommunications and data transmission for the Polish railways and also serves a number of other companies outside the PKP Group and individual clients. Because of the nature of the services it provides, TK Telekom has been designated by Poland as a company of special strategic interest. In 2015, Polish telecommunications company Netia acquired 100% of the share capital of TK Telekom.

The company was founded in 2001 following the division of the national rail operator Polskie Koleje Państwowe into several dozen separate companies in order to satisfy European Union requirements.

== See also ==
- Transportation in Poland
- List of railway companies
- Polish locomotives designation
