= Grażyna Gęsicka =

Polish politician and sociologist (1951–2010)

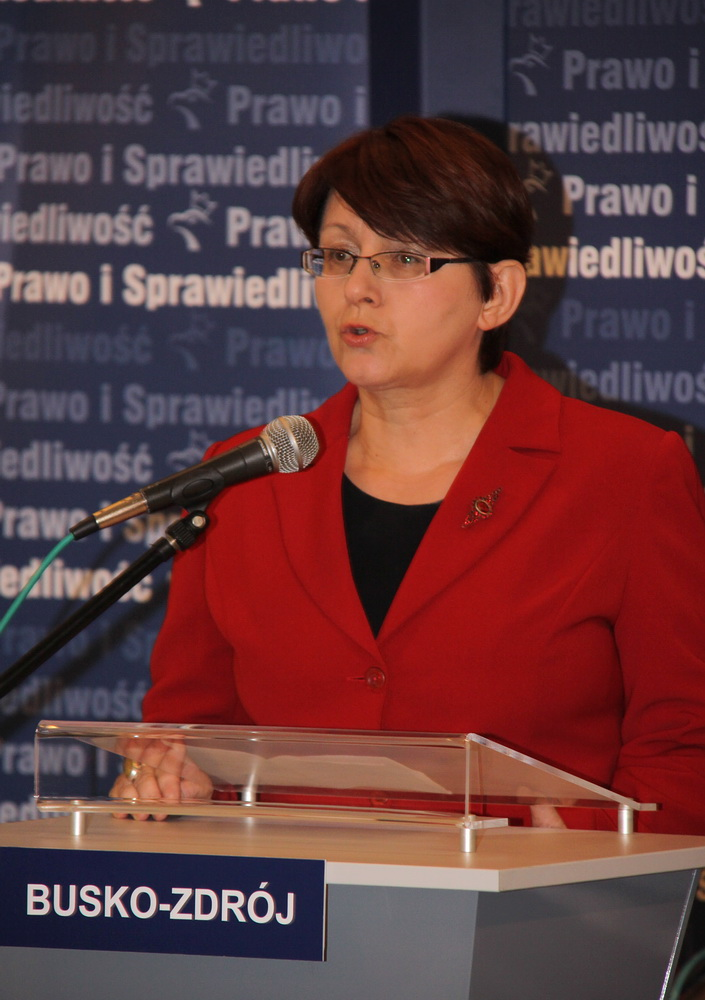

Deputy of the VI Sejm
- In office 2007 – 2010
- Succeeded by: Jan Warzecha
- Constituency: 23 Rzeszów

Minister of Regional Development
- In office 11 September – 16 November 2007
- Prime Minister: Jarosław Kaczyński
- Preceded by: Jarosław Kaczyński
- Succeeded by: Elżbieta Bieńkowska
- In office 31 October 2005 – 7 September 2007
- Prime Minister: Kazimierz Marcinkiewicz (2005–2006); Jarosław Kaczyński (2006–2007)
- Preceded by: Position established
- Succeeded by: Jarosław Kaczyński

Personal details
- Born: 13 December 1951 Warsaw, Poland
- Died: 10 April 2010 (aged 58) near Smolensk, Russia
- Party: Law and Justice
- Spouse: Janusz Gęsicki
- Children: Klara (daughter)
- Education: Warsaw University

Grażyna Gęsicka (13 December 1951 – 10 April 2010) was a Polish sociologist and politician and a former (2006–2007) minister of Regional Development in Marcinkiewicz's and Jarosław Kaczyński's government. In 2007 she was elected to the Sejm. From 2009 until her death she was the leader of Law and Justice parliamentary caucus.

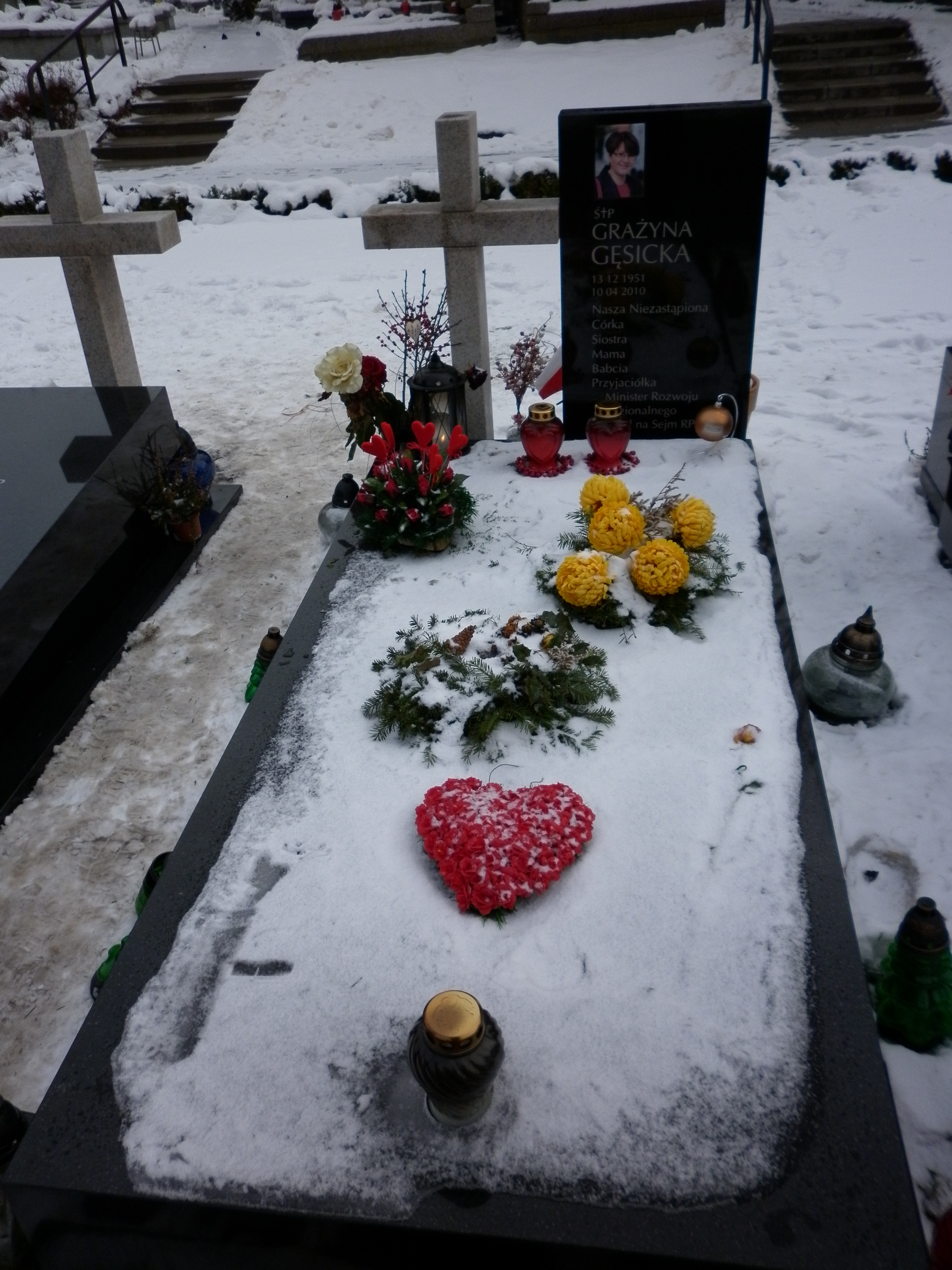
Grażyna Gęsicka's tomb in Powązki, 2011

She was born in Warsaw. In 1974, she graduated from Warsaw University's Institute of Sociology and in 1985 received her doctorate.

She was a former member of the Polish Sociological Society and the Association Internationale des Sociologues de Langue Francaise.

She was a speaker of English and French.

She was listed on the flight manifest of the Tupolev Tu-154 of the 36th Special Aviation Regiment carrying the President of Poland Lech Kaczyński which crashed near Smolensk-North airport near Pechersk near Smolensk, Russia, on 10 April 2010, killing all aboard. On 25 April, she was buried in the Smolensk Cemetery Headquarters Military Cemetery in Warsaw.

On 16 April 2010, Gęsicka was posthumously awarded the Commander's Cross of the Order of Polonia Restituta.
