= PKP Group =

Polish corporate group

Grupa PKP
- Company type: National holding
- Industry: Rail transport
- Founded: 2001 (After splitting PKP)
- Headquarters: Warsaw, Poland
- Key people: Krzysztof Mamiński; PKP SA chairman/CEO
- Revenue: 9 224 200 000 zł ▲ (2017)
- Net income: 652 900 000 zł ▲ (2017)
- Total assets: 25 540 900 000 zł ▼ (2017)
- Number of employees: 69 422
- Website: www.pkp.pl

The PKP Group (Polish: Grupa PKP) is a Polish corporate group founded in 2001, from the former state enterprise, Polish State Railways. The purpose of this change was to separate infrastructure management and transport operations.

It consists of the following companies, of which PKP S.A. has the dominant position:

Company name	Responsibility
Polskie Koleje Państwowe S. A.	Dominating company
PKP Intercity	Intercity passenger transport
PKP Szybka Kolej Miejska	Passenger transport within the Tricity conurbation
PKP Cargo (WSE: PKP)	Freight transport, company is owned by the PKP S.A. (50% + 1 share) and private investors
PKP Linia Hutnicza Szerokotorowa	Freight transport on the Broad Gauge Metallurgy Line
PKP Telekomunikacja Kolejowa	Rail telecommunication
PKP Informatyka	IT services

PKP Group has sold PKP Energetyka, an electricity supplier and most of the shares in PKP Polskie Linie Kolejowe, an infrastructure manager.

== See also ==
- Rail transport in Poland
