= Elżbieta Bieńkowska =

Polish politician (born 1964)

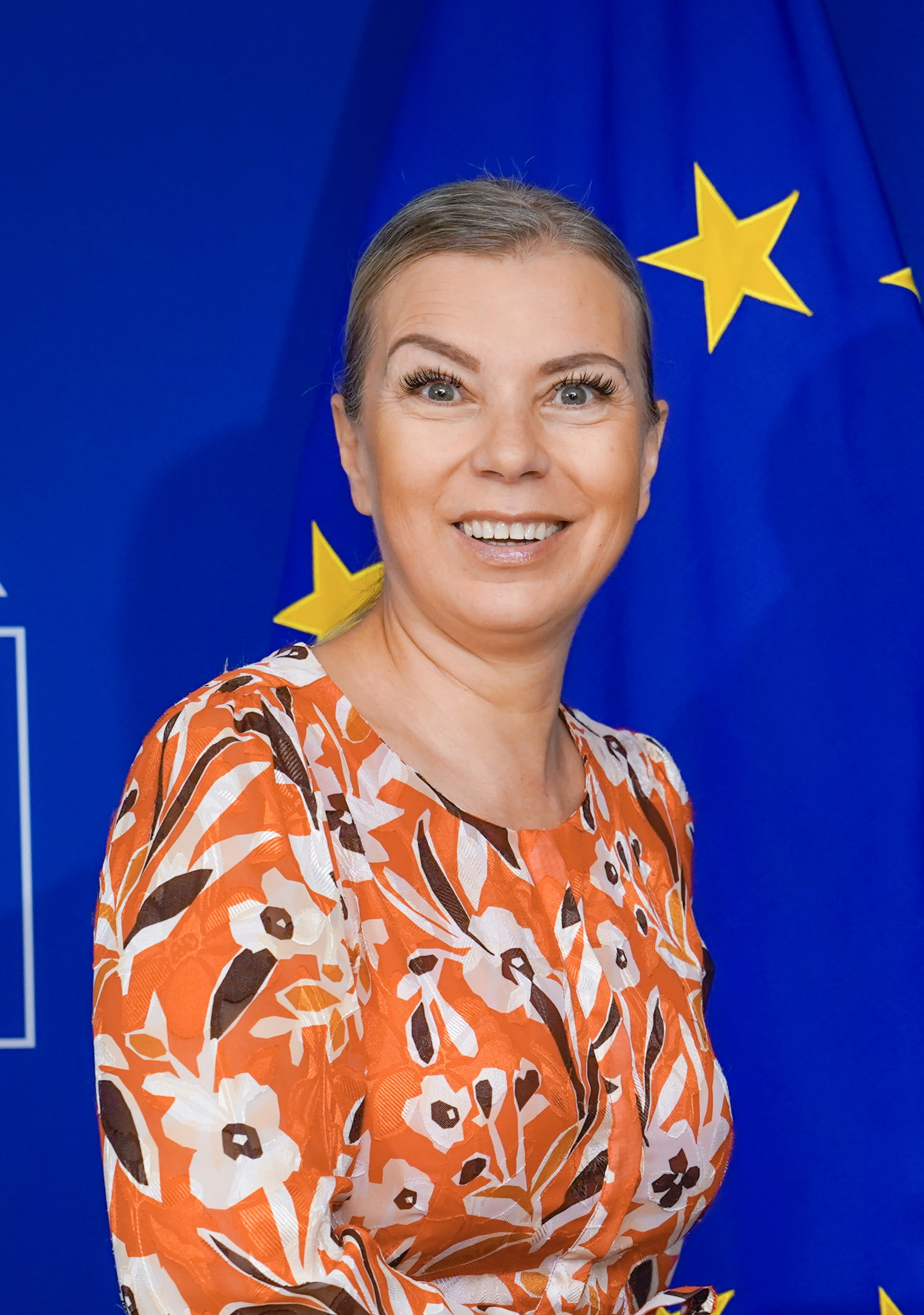
- Bieńkowska in 2019

European Commissioner for Internal Market and Services
- In office 1 November 2014 – 30 November 2019
- Commission: Juncker
- Preceded by: Michel Barnier
- Succeeded by: Thierry Breton (Internal Market)

European Commissioner for Industry and Entrepreneurship
- In office 1 November 2014 – 30 November 2019
- Commission: Juncker
- Preceded by: Ferdinando Nelli Feroci
- Succeeded by: Office abolished

Deputy Prime Minister of Poland
- In office 27 November 2013 – 22 September 2014
- President: Bronisław Komorowski
- Prime Minister: Donald Tusk
- Preceded by: Jacek Rostowski
- Succeeded by: Tomasz Siemoniak

Minister of Infrastructure and Development
- In office 27 November 2013 – 22 September 2014
- President: Bronisław Komorowski
- Prime Minister: Donald Tusk
- Preceded by: Office established
- Succeeded by: Maria Wasiak

Minister of Regional Development
- In office 16 November 2007 – 27 November 2013
- President: Lech Kaczyński; Bronisław Komorowski (Acting); Bogdan Borusewicz (Acting); Grzegorz Schetyna (Acting); Bronisław Komorowski
- Prime Minister: Donald Tusk
- Preceded by: Grażyna Gęsicka
- Succeeded by: Office abolished

Personal details
- Born: 4 February 1964 (age 62) Katowice, Poland
- Party: Civic Platform
- Spouse: Artur Bieńkowski
- Children: 3
- Education: Jagiellonian University; Polish National School of Public Administration; SGH Warsaw School of Economics

Elżbieta Ewa Bieńkowska (Polish pronunciation: [ɛlʐˈbʲɛta bʲɛɲˈkɔfska]; née Moycho; born on 4 February 1964) is a Polish politician who served as Poland's Deputy Prime Minister and Minister of Regional Development and Transport before becoming a European Commissioner in the team of Jean-Claude Juncker from 2014 to 2019.

Bieńkowska was Minister of Regional Development in Prime Minister Donald Tusk's Cabinet from 16 November 2007 until 27 November 2013, when she was appointed Deputy Prime Minister of Poland while continuing her previous responsibilities at the Ministry of Infrastructure and Development.

== Education ==
Bieńkowska graduated from Jagiellonian University with a Master's degree in Oriental Philology in 1989. She has also received a post-graduate Diploma from the Polish National School of Public Administration and afterwards a postgraduate studies MBA from SGH Warsaw School of Economics.

== Professional career ==
Bieńkowska's career in public administration started at Katowice City Council where she worked on regional contracts being promoted, in 1999, as head of Katowice's Department for Economy. Later that year, she was appointed Director of Regional Development for the Silesian Voivodeship, where she served until 2007.

== Career in politics ==
Bieńkowska describes herself as a technocrat. She is not a party member, and was elected to the Senate of Poland in 2011 as an independent candidate, backed by the Civic Platform.

=== Minister for Infrastructure and Development, 2007–2013 ===
In the government of Prime Minister Donald Tusk, Bieńkowska served as Minister for Infrastructure and Development for Poland, as well as Deputy Prime Minister from the end of 2013 until the end of September 2014. In this capacity, she was charge of allocating European Union funding and the country's transport infrastructure. Under her leadership, the ministry was Poland's second-largest department after the ministry of finance, with 1,600 employees and nine deputy ministers. In February 2013, she secured €105.8 billion from the EU budget for 2014-20.

=== Member of the European Commission, 2014–2019 ===
On 3 September 2014, Bieńkowska was announced as the Polish nominee to the European Commission, in place of foreign affairs minister Radek Sikorski, who had been put forward in August in a bid to secure the post of High Representative of the Union for Foreign Affairs and Security Policy.

On 10 September 2014, Juncker designated Bieńkowska as European Commissioner for Internal Market, Industry, Entrepreneurship and SMEs, following which, on 1 November 2014, she took office in the Juncker Commission.

In her capacity as Commissioner, Bieńkowska was in charge of the industrial part of the EU’s defence and security strategy and chaired the European Commission's High-level Group of Personalities on Defence Research from 2015. In 2016, she proposed the European Defence Fund and the accompanying European Defense Industrial Development Program, as part of the response to Britain’s decision to leave the EU.

Also during her time in office, Bieńkowska pushed for the European Commission to have oversight powers to supervise national controls and tests for cars in the wake of the Volkswagen emissions scandal. In 2018, she called for investing Horizon Europe funds of €20 billion into artificial intelligence research.

== Other activities ==
- TuBerculosis Vaccine Initiative (TBVI), Member of the Governance Board
- Una Europa Association, Member of the Advisory Board

== Honours and decorations ==
- - Commander (with Sash), Royal Norwegian Order of Merit
- - Fire Service Medal (Gold), Katowice

== Personal life ==
Bieńkowska is married and has three children.

== See also ==
- Bieńkowski coat of arms

Political offices
Preceded by Grażyna Gęsicka	Minister of Regional Development; 2007–2013	Position abolished
Preceded by Jacek Rostowski	Deputy Prime Minister of Poland; 2013–2014	Succeeded by Tomasz Siemoniak
New office	Minister of Infrastructure and Development; 2013–2014	Succeeded by Maria Wasiak
Preceded by Jacek Dominik	Polish European Commissioner; 2014–2019	Succeeded by Janusz Wojciechowski
Preceded by Michel Barnier as European Commissioner for Internal Market and Services	European Commissioner for Internal Market, Industry, Entrepreneurship and SMEs; 2014–2019	Succeeded by Thierry Breton
Preceded by Ferdinando Nelli Feroci as European Commissioner for Industry and Entrepreneurship	European Commissioner for Internal Market, Industry, Entrepreneurship and SMEs; 2014–2019	Succeeded by Thierry Breton
