= KredoBank =

Ukrainian bank

JSC KredoBank
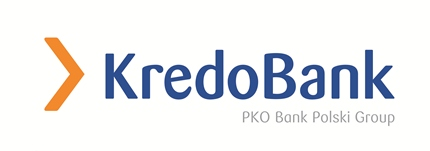
- Native name: АТ «Кредобанк»
- Formerly: West-Ukrainian Commercial Bank; Kredyt Bank (Ukraine)
- Type: Joint-stock company
- Industry: Financial services
- Founded: 14 May 1990; 36 years ago
- Headquarters: Lviv, Ukraine
- Area served: Ukraine
- Key people: Jakub Karnowski (chairman of the management board)
- Services: Banking
- Net income: ₴1.61 billion (2025)
- Total assets: ₴74.56 billion (2025)
- Total equity: ₴8.51 billion (2025)
- Owner: PKO Bank Polski (100%)
- Number of employees: 1,625 (2025)
- Website: kredobank.com.ua

KredoBank (Ukrainian: АТ «Кредобанк») is a Ukrainian commercial bank headquartered in Lviv. It is wholly owned by PKO Bank Polski and is classified by the National Bank of Ukraine (NBU) as a bank belonging to a foreign banking group. In June 2025, it was included among Ukraine's 16 systemically important banks.

The bank was established in 1990 as the West-Ukrainian Commercial Bank. It received investments from Poland's Kredyt Bank and the EBRD in 2000 and was acquired by PKO Bank Polski in 2004 before adopting its present name in 2006.

== History ==
The West-Ukrainian Commercial Bank was established in Lviv and registered with the State Bank of the Soviet Union on 14 May 1990. It was re-registered with the National Bank of Ukraine on 14 October 1991.

In 2000, the European Bank for Reconstruction and Development (EBRD) invested in the bank alongside Poland's Kredyt Bank. It was renamed Kredyt Bank (Ukraine) in 2002. In 2004, PKO Bank Polski acquired a 67 per cent shareholding from Kredyt Bank, and the bank adopted the KredoBank name on 1 March 2006. PKO Bank Polski subsequently became its sole shareholder.

The NBU first included KredoBank on its expanded list of systemically important banks in 2019 and has retained it on the list in subsequent annual reviews. Jakub Karnowski became chairman of KredoBank's management board on 1 March 2025 after approval by the NBU.

== Operations ==
KredoBank operates as a universal bank serving retail, corporate, and small and medium-sized business customers. At the end of 2025 it served about 555,000 individual clients and 54,000 legal entities and sole proprietors, and employed 1,625 people. Its network consisted of the head office and 64 branches at the end of that year.

During the Russian invasion of Ukraine, the bank expanded programmes intended to finance Ukrainian businesses. In 2023, the EBRD provided a €25 million risk-sharing guarantee designed to enable up to €100 million in new KredoBank financing, together with a trade-finance limit of up to €25 million. In October 2024, KredoBank signed an agreement for $40 million in guarantees from the United States International Development Finance Corporation, enabling up to $50 million in loans to Ukrainian small and medium-sized enterprises.

== Financial performance ==
KredoBank Group reported total assets of ₴74.56 billion at the end of 2025, compared with ₴62.02 billion a year earlier. Customer deposits amounted to ₴63.98 billion, total equity to ₴8.51 billion, and net profit to ₴1.61 billion.

== See also ==
- List of banks in Ukraine
