= Wasick =

Wasick is a surname. Notable people with the surname include:

- Katarzyna Wasick (born 1992), Polish swimmer
