= PKP Informatyka =

Polish railway technology company

PKP Informatyka Sp. z o.o.
- Company type: Ltd.
- Industry: Rail transport
- Founded: 2001
- Headquarters: Al. Jerozolimskie 142A; 02-305 Warsaw
- Key people: Tadeusz Turzyński; CEO; Maria Nowicka; Chairwoman of the supervisory board
- Services: Information and communications technology
- Revenue: 76.7 million zł ▼ (2017)
- Net income: 3.1 million zł ▼ (2017)
- Total assets: 27.8 million zł ▼ (2017)
- Number of employees: 329 (2014)
- Website: www.pkp-informatyka.pl

PKP Informatyka is a company of PKP Group responsible for supplying Polish railroad operators with IT technology.

The company was founded after dividing Polskie Koleje Państwowe (national rail operator) into several dozens companies to meet European Union Standards.

== See also ==
- Transportation in Poland
- List of railway companies
- Polish locomotives designation
- PKP Group
