= PGE Energetyka Kolejowa =

Electricity distributor to the Polish railway network

PGE Energetyka Kolejowa S.A.
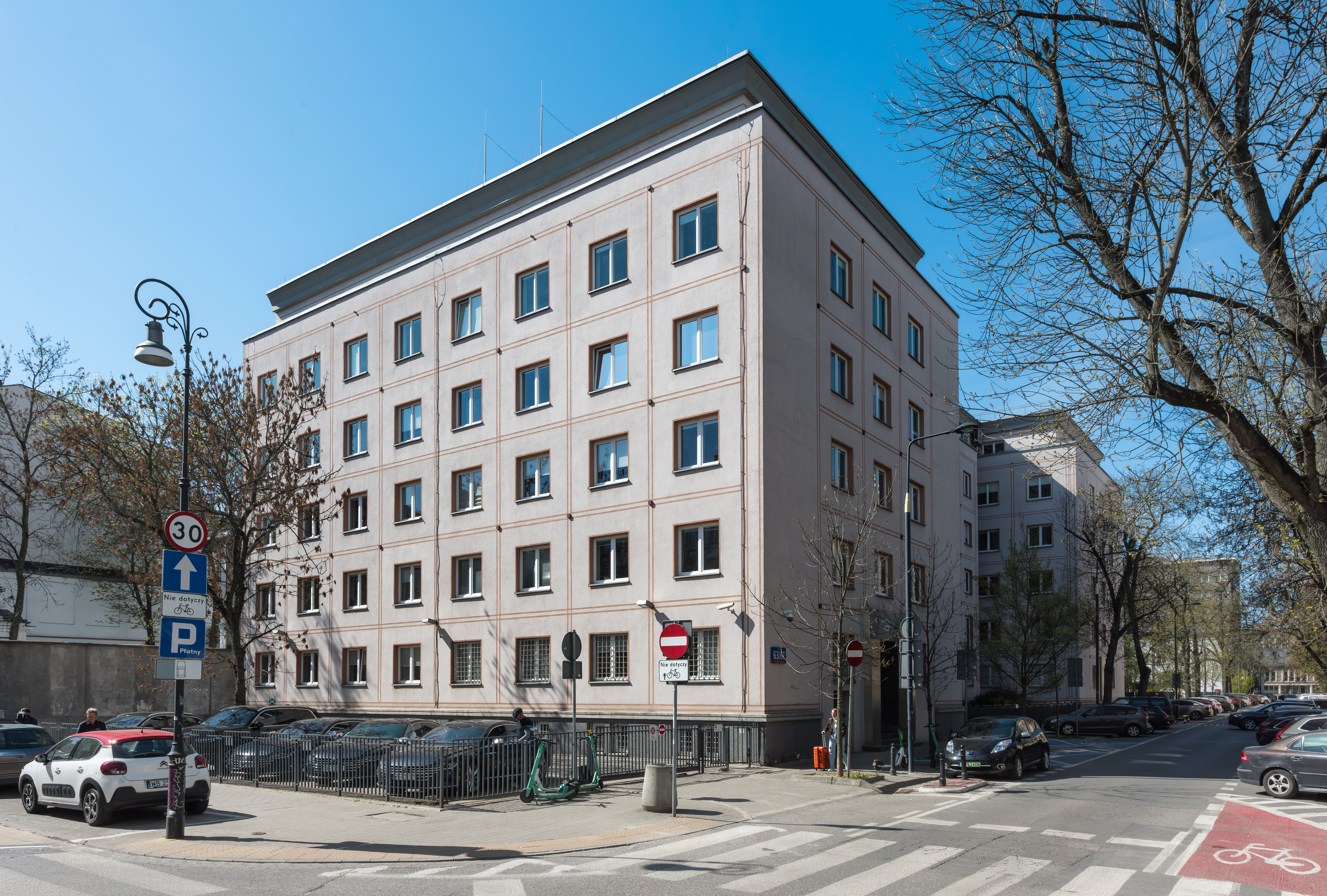
- Company type: Spółka akcyjna
- Industry: Electric power distribution, Rail transport
- Founded: 2001
- Headquarters: Warsaw, Poland
- Key people: Wojciech Orzech; CEO
- Revenue: 688,000,000 euro (2018)
- Net income: 40,300,000 euro (2018)
- Number of employees: 5,900 (2016)
- Website: www.pgeenergetykakolejowa.pl

PGE Energetyka Kolejowa S.A., until 2023 PKP Energetyka S.A. is the cross-country electricity distributor to the Polish railway network and other business customers. It also provides nationwide maintenance and emergency response services to the railway network, operates fuel stations for diesel locomotives and is active in electricity and gas reselling. It owns 20,000 km of distribution network and operates a fleet of highly specialised trains and rail equipment across Poland.

It was created in 2001 as the result of the division of Polskie Koleje Państwowe (Poland's state-owned railway company) into several dozen companies to prepare the ground for privatisation in line with advice that the Polish government had received from the World Bank.

PKP Group originally planned to privatise PKP Energetyka in 2011, and sold it to CVC Capital Partners for 1.965 billion PLN (~525 million USD) in September 2015.

In late 2022, it was reported that the Polish PiS government might buy back PKP Energetyka from CVC Capital Partners. On 28 December 2022, PGE Polska Grupa Energetyczna signed a preliminary agreement with the CVC Fund to purchase 100% of shares in PKPE Holding sp. z o.o. which owns 100% of shares in PKP Energetyka S.A. On 3 April 2023, PGE Polska Grupa Energetyczna acquired from the CVC Fund 100% of shares in PKPE Holding sp. z o.o. thus closing the purchase transaction of PKP Energetyka S.A. On 4 April 2023, the company's name was changed from PKP Energetyka to PGE Energetyka Kolejowa.

== See also ==
- Transportation in Poland
- List of railway companies
- Polish locomotives designation
- PKP Group
