= Polish State Railways =

Dominant railway operator in Poland

Polish State Railways Polskie Koleje Państwowe (PKP)

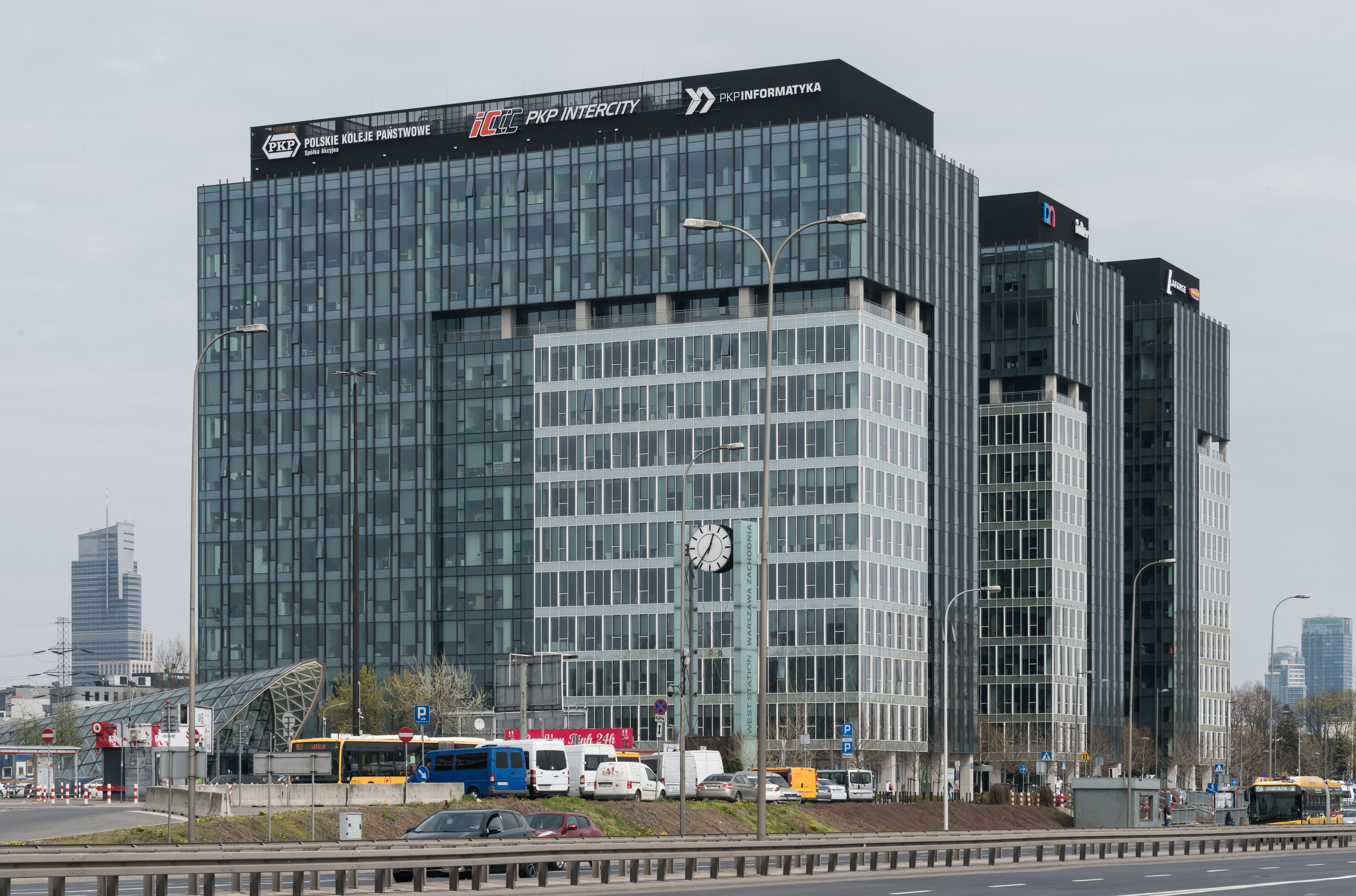
- Headquarters
- Type: JSC (S.A.)
- Industry: Rail transport
- Founded: 24 September 1926
- Headquarters: Warszawa Zachodnia station, Warsaw, Poland
- Key people: Alan Beroud (President and CEO); Jarosław Bełdowski (Chairman of the supervisory board)
- Products: property management, asset management
- Revenue: 1.019 billion PLN▲ (2017)
- Net income: 192.8 million PLN ▲ (2017)
- Total assets: 15.046 billion PLN ▼ (2017)
- Owner: State Treasury of the Republic of Poland
- Number of employees: 8220 (2017)
- Subsidiaries: PKP Intercity; PKP Cargo; Tricity SKM; PKP Linia Hutnicza Szerokotorowa; PKP Informatyka; Xcity Investment
- Website: www.pkp.pl

The Polish State Railways (Polish: Polskie Koleje Państwowe [ˈpɔlskʲɛ ˈkɔlɛjɛ paj̃ˈstfɔvɛ], abbr.: PKP S.A.) is a Polish state-owned holding company (legally a sole-shareholder company of the State Treasury) comprising the rail transport holdings of the country's formerly dominant namesake railway operator. The company was reformed in 2001 when the former Polish State Railways state-owned enterprise was divided into several units based on the need for separation between infrastructure management and transport operations. Polish State Railways is the dominant company in the PKP Group collective that resulted from the split, and maintains 100% share control, being fully responsible for the assets of all of the other PKP Group component companies.

PKP is currently the parent company of the PKP Group, passenger operators PKP Intercity and the Tricity Rapid Urban Railway. Freight carriers PKP Cargo and PKP Linia Hutnicza Szerokotorowa are also parts of the group. PKP is also one of the largest real estate managers in Poland.

== History ==
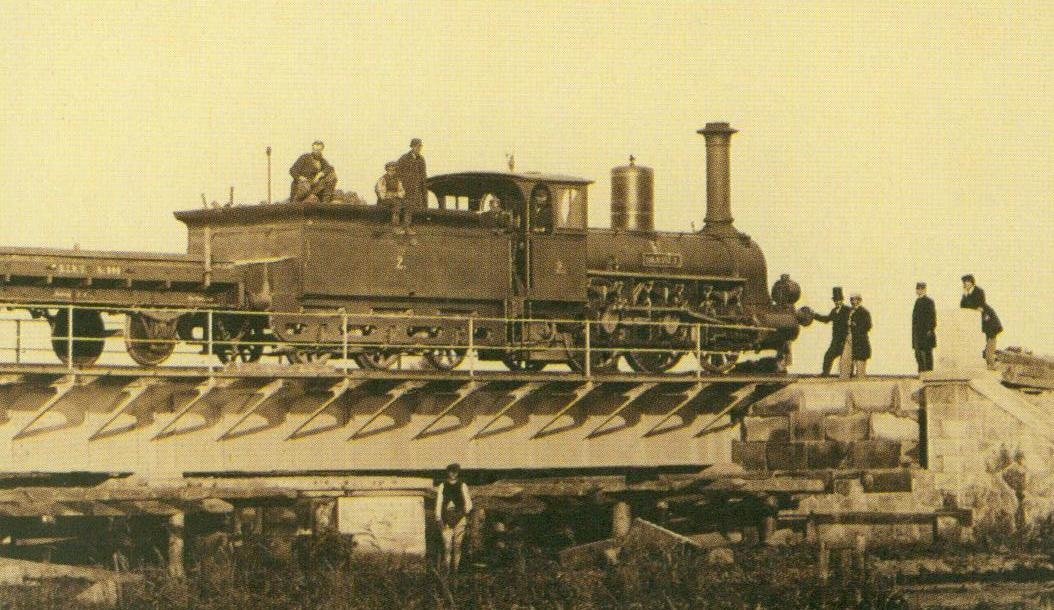
A steam engine of the Warsaw–Terespol railway, 1866

=== World War I and interwar years ===
Regaining independence on 11 November 1918 allowed Poland to reclaim the former Russian and Austrian sectors from military railways. The Railway Department in the Ministry of Communication was created and the Polish railways were officially named Polskie Koleje Państwowe.

In December 1918, the Greater Poland Uprising started. The rebels took over the former Prussian sector of railways. One year later, after the Polish–Ukrainian War ended, the former Austrian railway directorate was taken over by Poland. Taking over the railways from Prussians lasted until 1921.

After Polish victory in the Polish–Soviet War (1920), the retreating Communists caused heavy damage to railways in eastern Poland. At the same time, tense relations with Lithuania led to partial disintegration and stagnation of the railways around Vilnius and Minsk. The Libau–Romny Railway was not recovered.

The Polish railways administration finally took over the railways in Upper Silesia in 1922. That same year, a decision was made to divide railways in Poland into nine administrative districts.

An economic crisis in the 1930s forced the state to cut back its budget for railway investment. Profit decreased by 50% compared to 1929. The next year, over 23,000 PKP employees had been dismissed and protests and strikes caused authorities to try to find a solution. The end of the crisis and an increase in cargo transport and income came in 1937.

=== World War II ===
Following the German invasion on 1 September 1939 and the Soviet invasion of eastern Poland on 17 September 1939, most Polish rolling stock fell into Soviet hands.

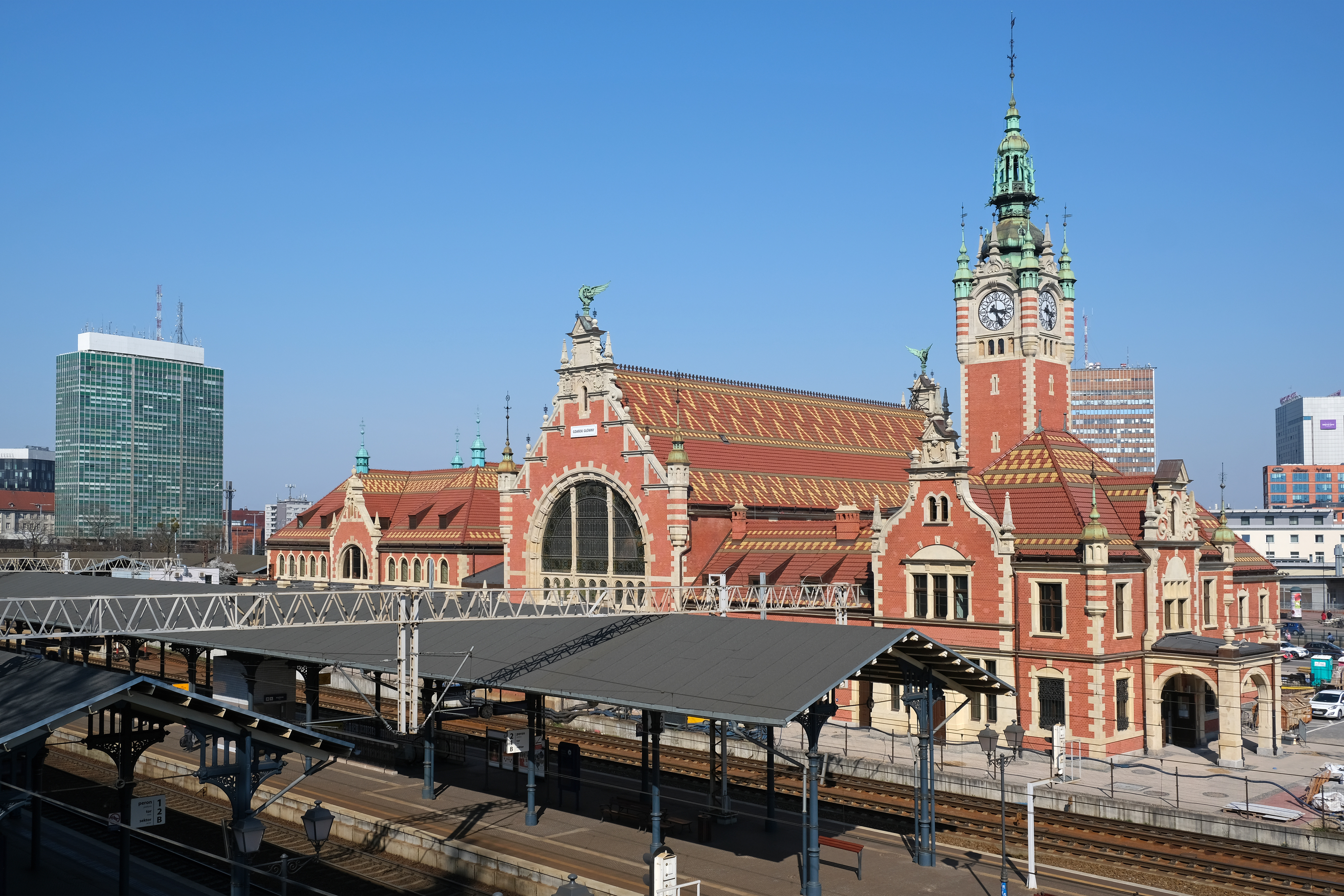
Gdańsk Główny is one of Poland's largest category A stations.

The Polish railways in Upper Silesia, Greater Poland and Pomerelia were adopted by German railways Deutsche Reichsbahn on 25 September. The Polish railways in Generalgouvernement became Ostbahn.

Until the last moment before the German attack on the Soviet Union in 1941, cargo trains transported goods from the Soviet Union to Germany. The beginning of German attacks on the Soviet Union on 22 June 1941 resulted in the possession of railway and rolling stock by the Ostbahn and the possession of PKP rolling stock with Russian Broad Gauge track and reconstruction to standard gauge. The beginning of organized railway sabotage during World War II by the Polish resistance movement on railways took place about the same time.

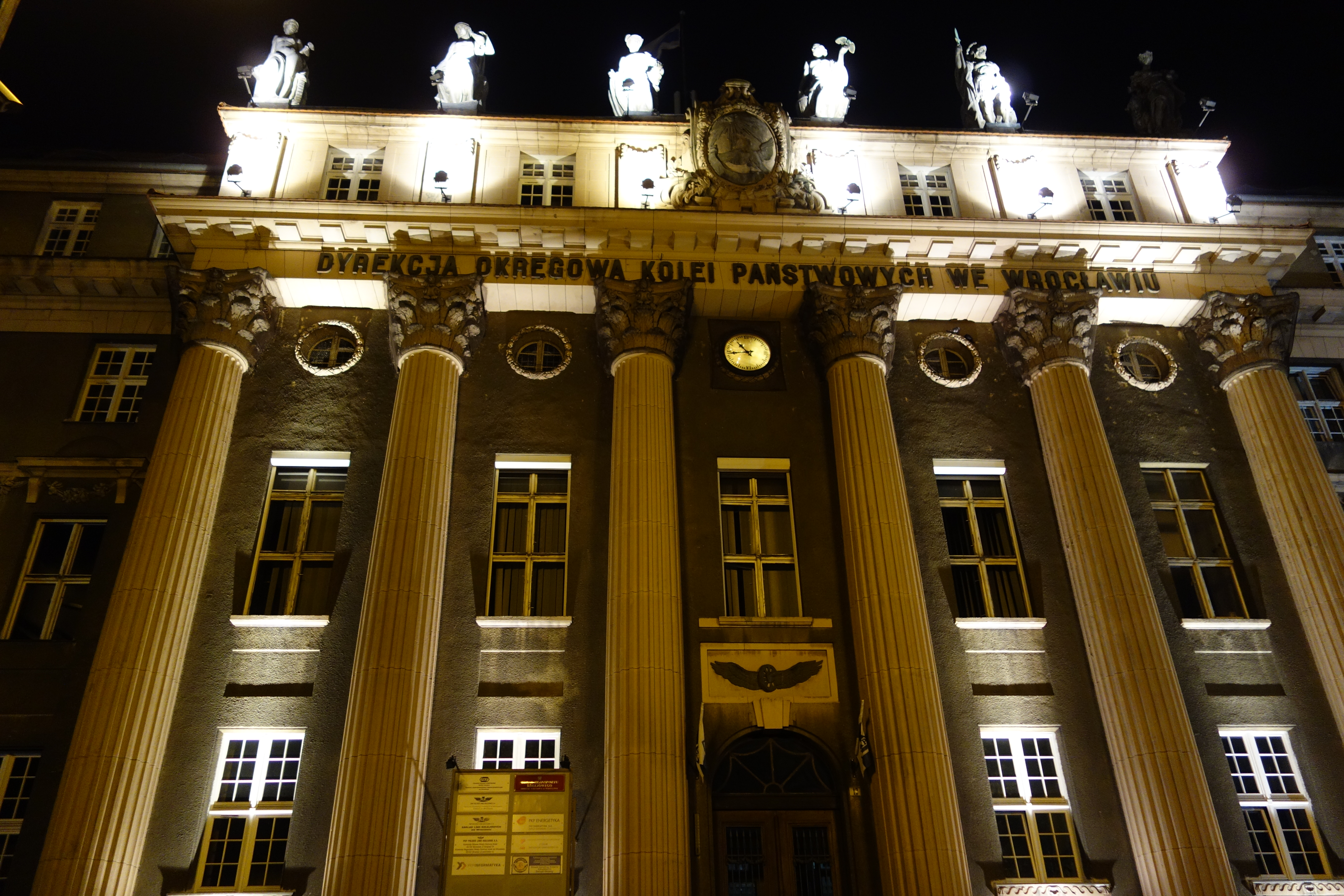
PKP regional headquarters in Wrocław

In 1942, production of simple military-use DR Kriegslok BR52 (PKP class Ty2) steam locomotives began in Poznań and Chrzanów; the steam boilers for these locomotives were produced in Sosnowiec.

The Warsaw Uprising caused widespread damage of Warsaw rolling stock, network and electric traction; both bridges over the Vistula River and the tunnel on the Warsaw Cross-City Line were destroyed.

At the beginning of 1945, the Ministry of Transport was created, as well as the Regional Directorate of National Railways. Many pre-war locomotives were sent to the Soviet Union. Poland received German locomotives as a compensation for war losses. In June, the rail connection with Warsaw was opened, using a temporary railway station made of warehouses. On 15 September 1945, PKP took over management of all railway lines on former German, now Polish Western and Northeastern land from the Soviet Union. Due to the Red Army's rapid advance into Germany proper, the railway lines of Silesia, Farther Pomerania, and East Prussia largely remained intact, so that operations could be resumed. However, on many lines, the second track was removed and transported to the Soviet Union as war reparations. Because the Polish did not have enough personnel, Germans continued their work, to be deported only in 1946. Revising station names took quite some time, often causing confusion because the decreed Polish names were once again changed.

Maps of the Polish railroad network still reflect the borders drawn in 1945, because in the lands annexed in 1945, railroad lines are relatively dense. In the former territory of Congress Poland, however, only a few still existing main lines had been built in the 19th century.

=== Post-war years ===
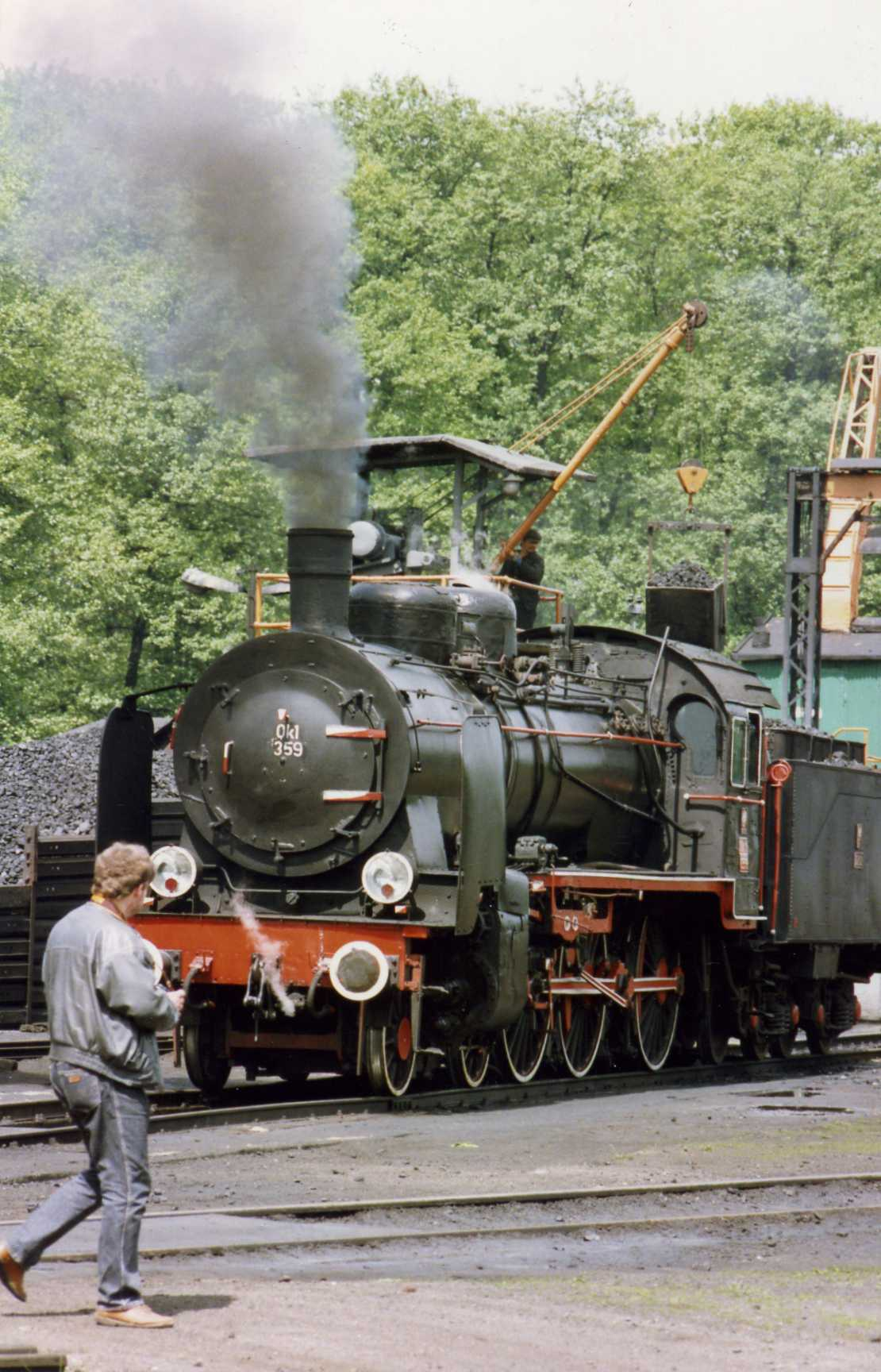
A British trainspotter walks in front of an Ok1 in Wolsztyn, 1991

During the mid-to-late communist era, the state of the Polish railways deteriorated to a large extent. Once a large and profitable network, the systemic lack of funding and failure to acquire new rolling stock left PKP far behind the railway operators of Western Europe in terms of technical advances and passenger comfort. In addition to this, the poor state of many rail lines throughout the country led to ever-increasing journey times for passengers, and as a result left the railways far less able to compete with intercity bus and air services. During the entire communist period, only one major infrastructural project relating to the railways was completed. This, the Central Trunk Line, was a prestige project completed in 1976, intended both for heavy coal transport and fast passenger services. This line for the first time allowed passengers to travel in comfort and at relatively high speed from Kraków and Katowice to Warsaw; however, high-speed services have never started, although test runs reached 250 km/h in 1994. Moreover, despite the successful completion of the section from southern to central Poland, the planned extension to Gdańsk and the country's Baltic ports was never realised, and this significantly curtailed both the usefulness and potential of the line.

The PKP has been a tourist attraction for British trainspotters since at least the mid-twentieth century. The late withdrawal of steam power on the PKP system meant that Poland was an attractive destination for rail enthusiasts long after steam had ended on Britain's railways. The last PKP steam shed in Wolsztyn has remained in operation as a result of this tourism and continues to operate regular steam hauled services.

=== 1990 to today ===
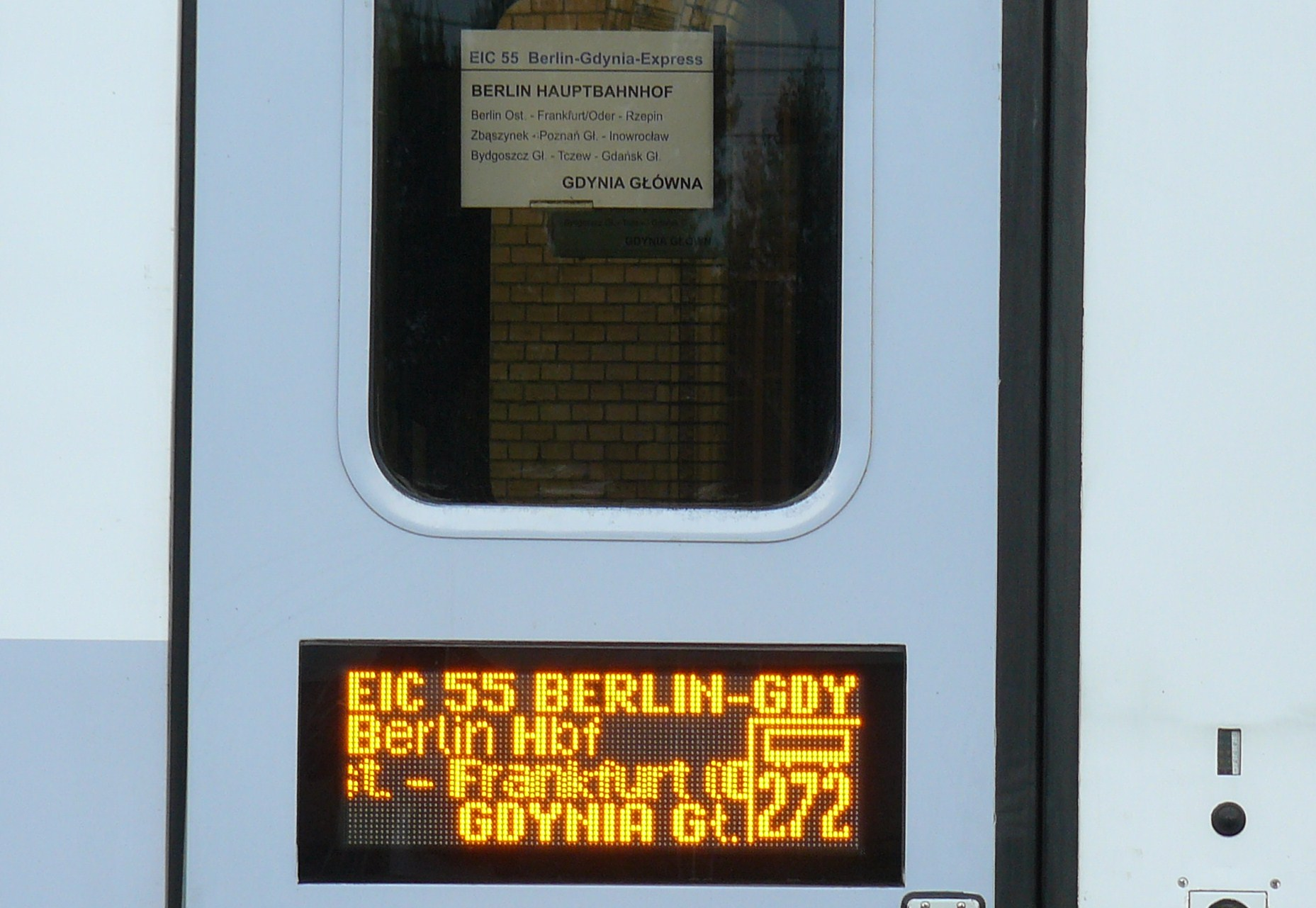
Dot matrix information board on a Polish PKP Intercity train from Berlin to Gdynia via Gdańsk

Since Poland's return to democracy in the early 1990s, the Polish State Railways have faced ever-increasing competition from private automotive transport and the country's rapidly expanding network of motorways and express roads. However, ever-decreasing journey times, better schedules which allow for well-coordinated connections, the rise of private operators and large-scale investment in infrastructure, in many cases aided by European Union funding, as well as new rolling stock is slowly enticing people back onto the railways.

On 14 December 2014 PKP Intercity Pendolino trains began operating on the CMK line (224 km line from Kraków and Katowice to Warsaw) with trains reaching 200 km/h (124 mph) as a regularly scheduled operation. There is a plan by PKP Polskie Linie Kolejowe (infrastructure manager) to increase speed to 250 km/h on whole line soon. In the day of 13 December 2020 the speed limit was raised to 200 km/h also on the line from Warsaw to seaport Gdynia by New Pendolino train.

== Corporate subdivisions ==
=== PKP Intercity ===
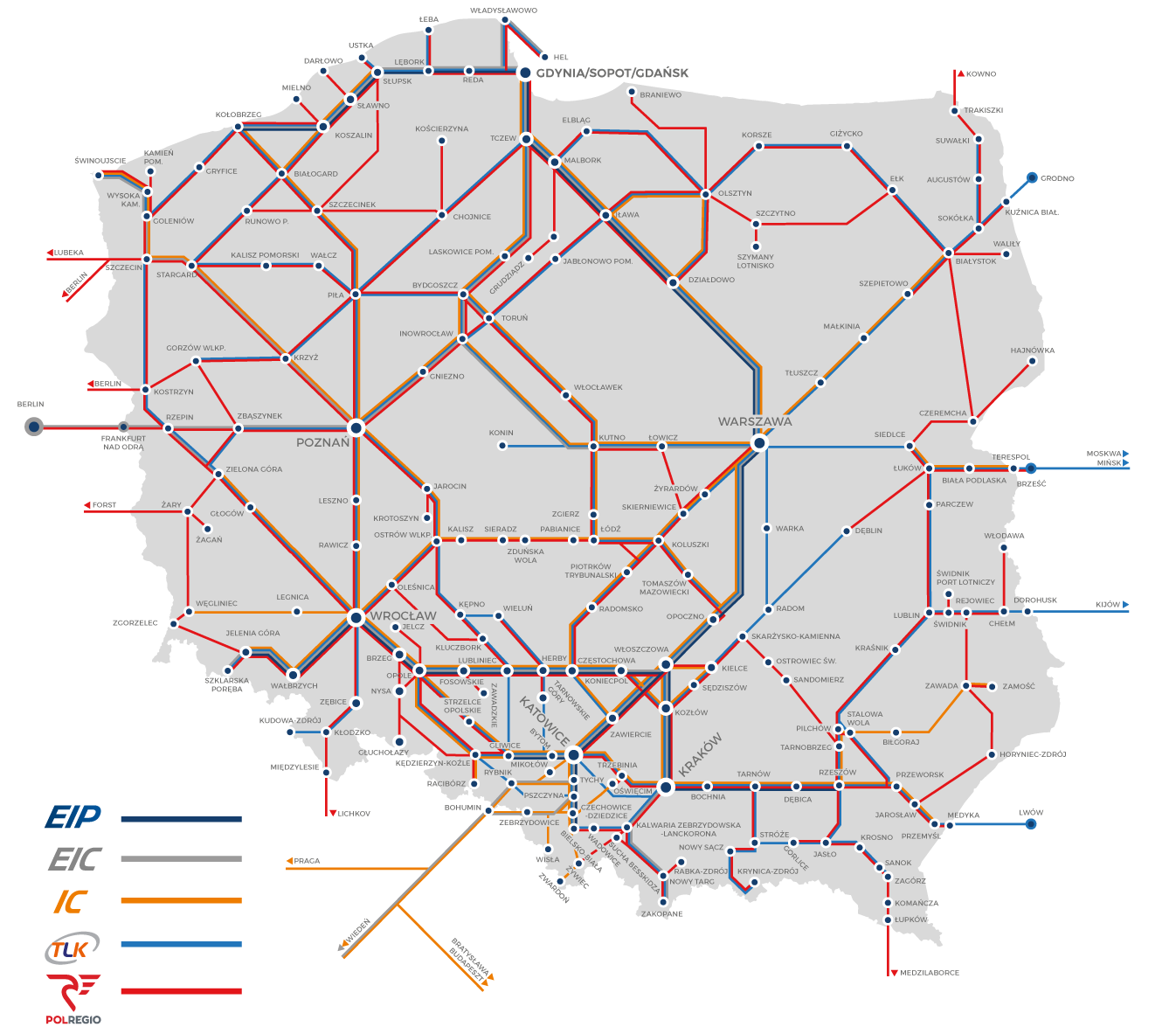
Railway connections by PKP Intercity and Polregio

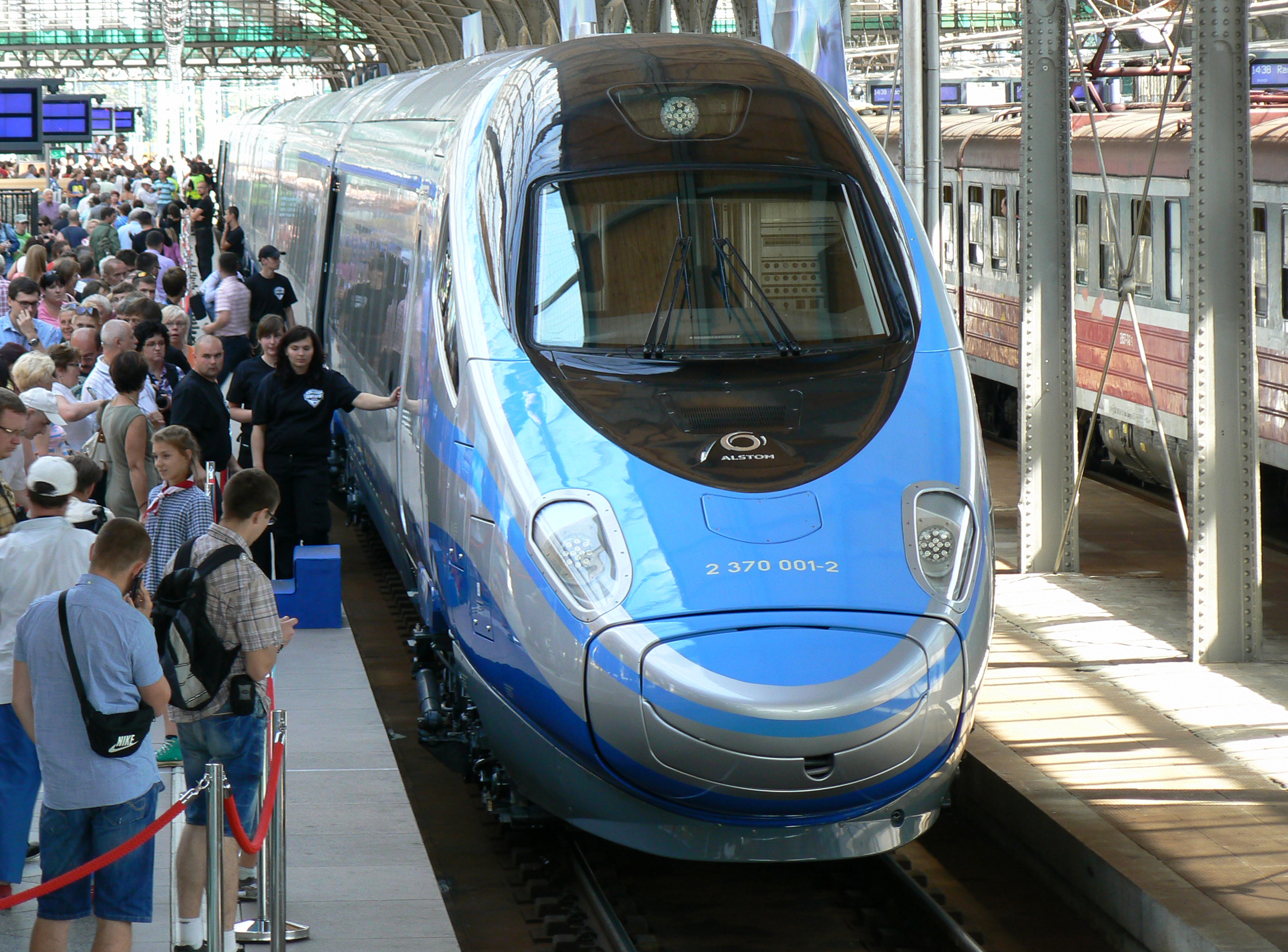
A PKP Intercity ED250 New Pendolino at Wrocław Main Station

PKP Intercity is a semi-independent division of PKP that operates long-distance passenger trains in Poland. It was founded in 2001 when, in preparation for separation between infrastructure management and transport operations, the Polish State Railways were reorganized into a number of independent operating companies under the unified direction of the PKP Group.

PKP Intercity operates all InterCity trains in Poland as well as most of the country's EuroCity services throughout Europe. Although competition is rising in the long-distance rail travel market in Poland, PKP Intercity still holds a de facto monopoly in the industry, as its current market share represents almost 100% of the segment.

PKP Intercity's trains currently (2015) operate under the following brands:

- Express InterCity Premium (EIP) - Pendolino high-speed trains
- EuroCity (EC): International trains which operate major routes and require a reservation
- Express InterCity (EIC) - introduced in 2009, as a result, the train category EX was phased out
- InterCity (IC) - Intercity trains
- Twoje Linie Kolejowe (TLK) - Low cost, intercity trains
- InterCityBus (ICBUS)- Intercity coach services

=== PKP Cargo ===
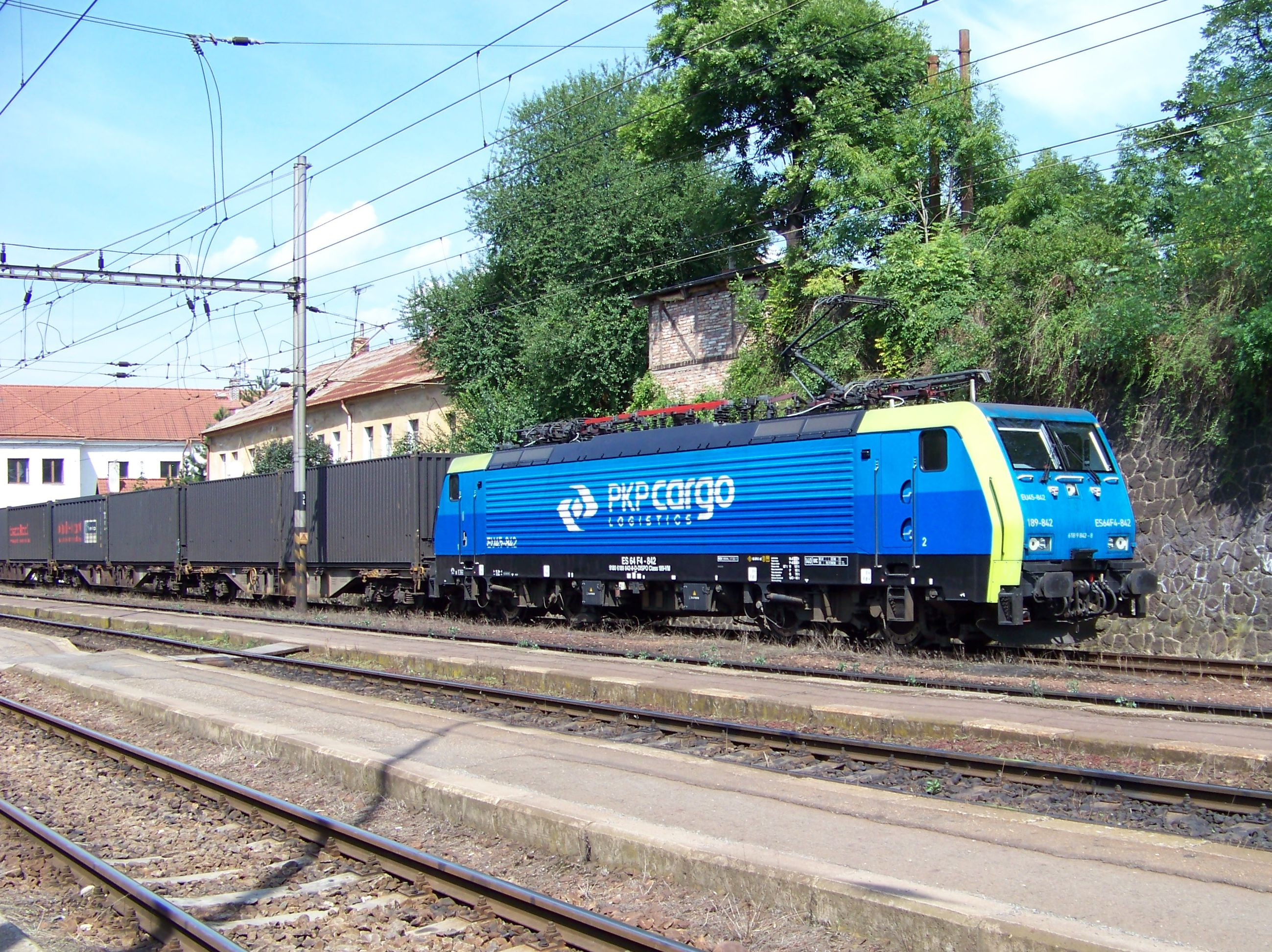
A PKP Cargo locomotive

PKP Cargo (WSE: PKP), founded in 2001 so as to satisfy a European Court ruling on the required restructuring of the Polish State Railways prior to joining the EU, is the PKP group company responsible for freight transport operations. It is currently the largest railway cargo carrier in Poland, and second-largest in the European Union. The company was founded after dividing Polskie Koleje Państwowe (all-national rail operator) into several dozens of companies to meet European Union Standards.

PKP Cargo is owned by the PKP S.A. (50% + 1 share) and private investors.

=== PKP Szybka Kolej Miejska ===
PKP SKM is an S-Bahn-like service operating in the Tricity area, consisting of Gdynia, Sopot and Gdańsk.

Depending on the time of day, electric multiple units operate with headways between 6 and 30 minutes. The Tricity area is uniquely suited for this mode of transport, as it's shaped in a relatively narrow north–south corridor between the Gdańsk Bay and the Tricity Landscape Park.

=== PKP Linia Hutnicza Szerokotorowa ===
PKP LHS is a company of the PKP Group responsible for infrastructure operation and freight transport on the Broad Gauge Metallurgy Line. The line runs for about 400 km from the Polish-Ukrainian border in Izow-Hrubieszów to Sławków Południowy (near Katowice).

The line was opened in 1979 and was used to import iron ore from the USSR, as well as to export coal and sulphur from Poland. After the fall of communism and the economic changes of 1989, traffic on the line has much diminished. At present various schemes are being tried to increase its profitability. This line runs as a single-track line for almost 400 km, from the Polish-Ukrainian border crossing just east of Hrubieszów to Sławków Południowy (near Katowice). It is used only for freight traffic, mainly iron ore and coal. It is the westernmost broad gauge railway line in Europe that is connected to the broad gauge rail system of the countries which before 1991 constituted the Soviet Union.

== Power supply ==
Electric train traction of Polish State Railway started in 1936 in Warsaw area and is performed since the beginning with 3 kV DC. As of 1 January 2011, 11,481 kilometres were electrified by a total length of 19,276 kilometres.

All used power is taken from the public grid and rectified in substations. Most substations are fed with voltages between 15 and 30 kV. Where lines have heavy traffic and higher speed, the substations are fed from the 110 kV grid.

The switchyard of substations fed from voltages below 30 kV is indoors, outdoor switchgear is used at 110 kV. The distance between substations is between 15 and 28 kilometres. For reliability of supply, substations are usually fed by at least two powerlines. Each substation normally feeds two segments of the overhead wire, which are separated by a switch. As is common with DC systems, the negative pole is grounded. Halfway between two substations, there is a switch, which can be used to connect the overhead wires together. At some lines, a three-phase AC line operated with 6 kV, 15 kV or 20 kV runs parallel to the railway line, either on the poles of the overhead wire or on separate poles. It is used for power supply of signals, level crossing equipment and other devices requiring electric power used for the rail. This line can be also used for emergency power supply of substations.

== Former PKP group companies ==
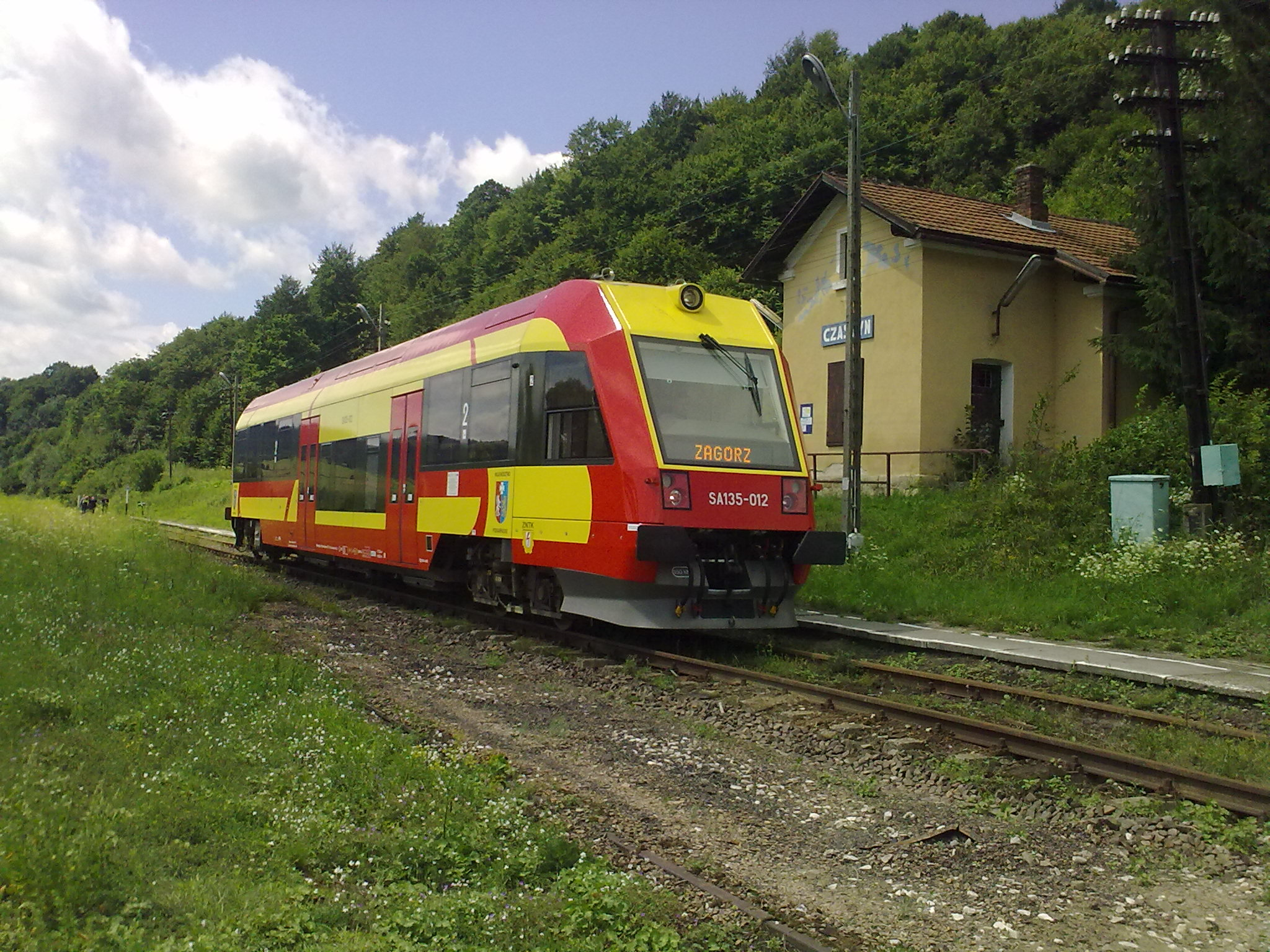
DMU SA135 of Przewozy Regionalne

=== Polregio ===
Until 22 December 2008, Polregio was a wholly owned subsidiary of the PKP Group; after that date, all of its shares have been transferred to Poland's 16 regional governments. Thus, the company is no longer part of the PKP Group and on interregional routes its InterRegio trains compete with PKP Intercity TLK trains. This was done in order to increase competition amongst operators on the Polish rail network. The company finally changed its name from PKP Przewozy Regionalne to Przewozy Regionalne on 8 December 2009, and was fully rebranded as Polregio in December 2016.

=== Polskie Linie Kolejowe ===
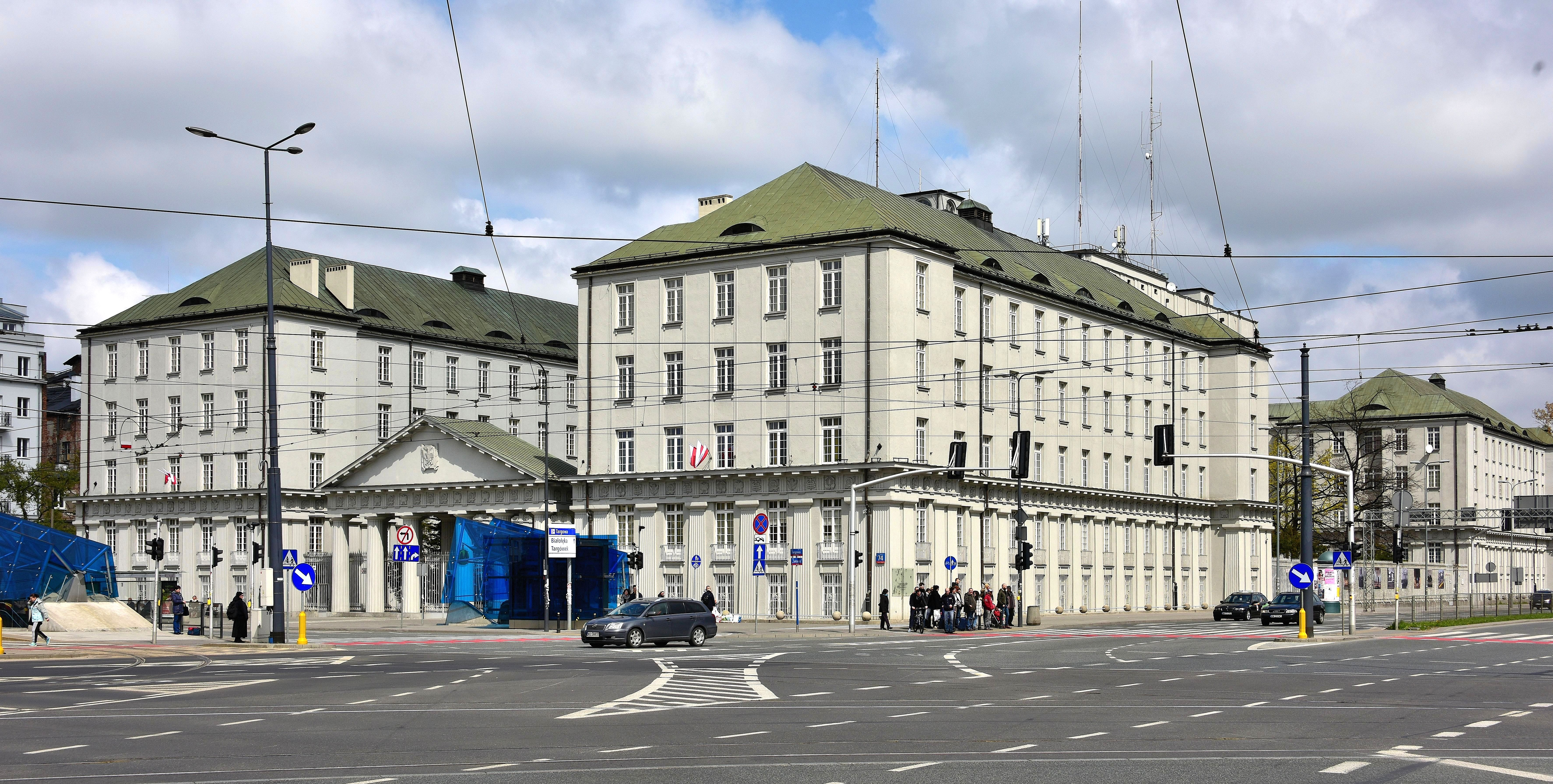
Former headquarters of the Polish State Railways in Warsaw on Targowa Street. Now the HQ of PKP Polskie Linie Kolejowe.

A company responsible for maintenance of rail tracks, conducting trains across the country, scheduling train timetables, and management of railway property, such as lines and stations. In 2024 PKP owns 16.54% of this company's shares.

=== PKP Energetyka ===
A company responsible for supplying Polish railroad operators with electric energy. PKP Energetyka was founded after dividing PKP into a group of several dozen independent companies to meet European Union Standards.

PKP Group sold PKP Energetyka to CVC Capital Partners in 2015, which in turn sold it to PGE Polska Grupa Energetyczna in 2022.

== See also ==
- History of rail transport in Poland
- List of railway companies
- List of Railway lines of Poland
- List of rolling stock used in Poland
- PKP Group
- Polish State Railroads in summer 1939
- Przemyślanin
- Rail transport in Poland
- Transportation in Poland
