= Kopp family, Bydgoszcz =

Polish family, entrepreneurs, Bydgoszcz, Poland, 19th–20th century

Kopp
- Family
- Current region: Poland
- Origin: Bromberg/Bydgoszcz, Prussia Poland
- Members: Johann Gottlieb, Wilhelm Gottlieb Kopp, Feliks Ernst Max Kopp
- Properties: Kopp dyehouse in Bydgoszcz

Wilhelm and Feliks Kopp were two prominent entrepreneurs of Bydgoszcz between the end of the 19th century and the mid-20th century.

== Wilhelm Kopp (1850-1919) ==
Wilhelm Gottlieb was born on May 15, 1850, in Wilczak, then a suburban commune of Bromberg, today a district of Bydgoszcz. He was the son of Johann Gottlieb, a carpenter, and Caroline Wilhelmine née Fenske.

He left Bydgoszcz/Bromberg in his youth to learn the trade of a dyeing. He lived, among others, in Charlottenburg, near Berlin. In 1878, he returned to his hometown and set up a small dye workshop in Prinzen Straße (present day Władysława Łokietka street).

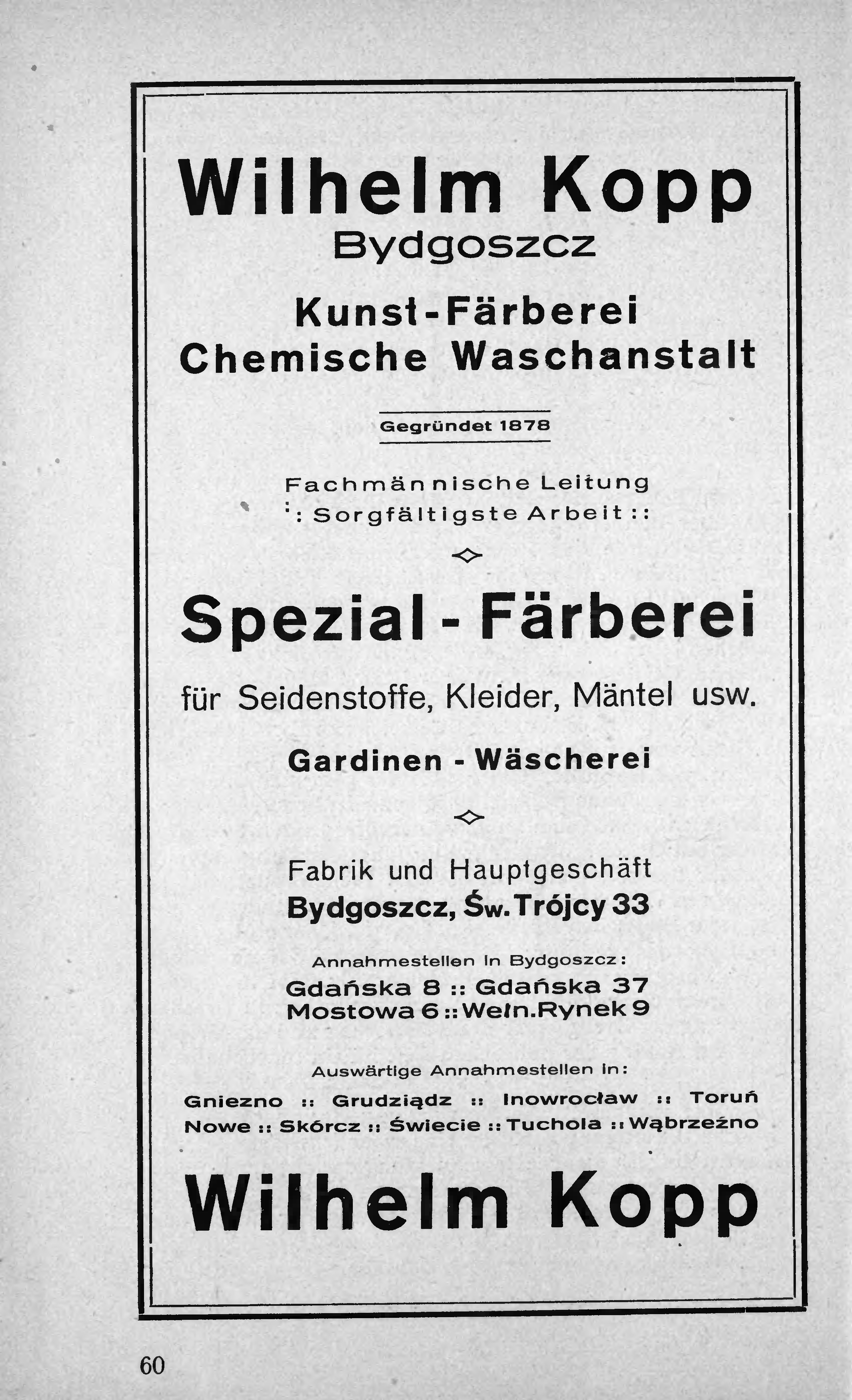
Kopp factory advertising, 1928

In 1883, Wilhelm bought from Wilhelm Borchert a larger dyeworks and dry cleaning house established in 1830, in Posener Straße (at today's 32 Poznańska street). He upgraded the old facility by installing steam engine power. Unfortunately, the factory burned down ten years later due to the carelessness of one of the workers in the laundry, igniting gasoline, then used as a cleaning agent.

Following this accident Wilhelm Kopp established a new factory in a tenement house on Wełniany Rynek, which operated 10 years.

In 1903, Kopp purchased a new plot on Berliner Straße, constructing there from scratch a large dyeing plant. The result was an impressive four-story factory building, giving directly Młynówka river, a water channel feeding the watermills in the area.

With its growing activity in the 1910s, Kopp's company was one of the largest dyeing firms in eastern German Empire. It had branches in nearby cities (Chełmno, Grudziądz, Inowrocław, Toruń) and employed around 60 people.

Wilhelm Kopp ran the company on his own almost until his death, on November 28, 1919, in Bydgoszcz. In May 1919, he had extended company's ownership to his wife and their eldest son, Wilhelm, and later the company became the joint property of the other children.

In practice, the business was run only by three brothers, Wilhelm Rudolf Albert, Julius Otto Friedrich and Feliks Ernst Max.

Wilhelm Kopp was married to Hermine Friederike Auguste née Heudtlass. They had 9 children.

== Feliks Kopp (1884-1961) ==
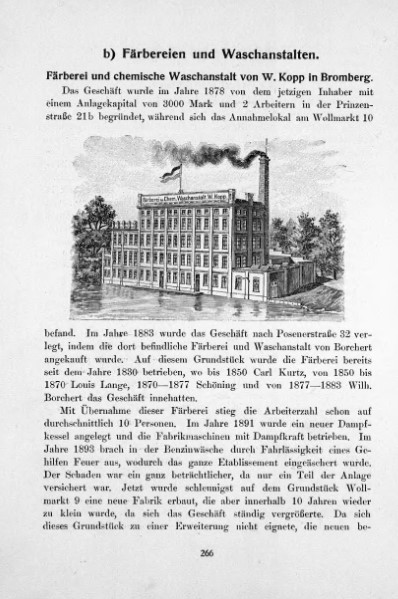
Kopp dyehouse 1907

Feliks Ernst Max was born on February 15, 1884, in Bromberg. He was one of the youngest sons of Wilhelm Kopp.

After finishing primary school, he attended realschule in downtown and graduated in the spring of 1902. After completing his education, he entered the family dyeing business.

Initially, he worked as a commercial manager in the facility along Mill island. During this period, the company experienced a growing prosperity and extended its network in the region.

After the demise of Wilhelm Kopp, Feliks, together with his brothers Wilhelm Jr. and Juliusz took over the direction of the company, on behalf of all their siblings.

He married Erna Ada née Deylitz in 1930. They had 2 sons, Joachim Lothar (born 1931) and Tilo Manfred (born 1935). The family lived in a tenement house at 3 Mickiewicza avenue.

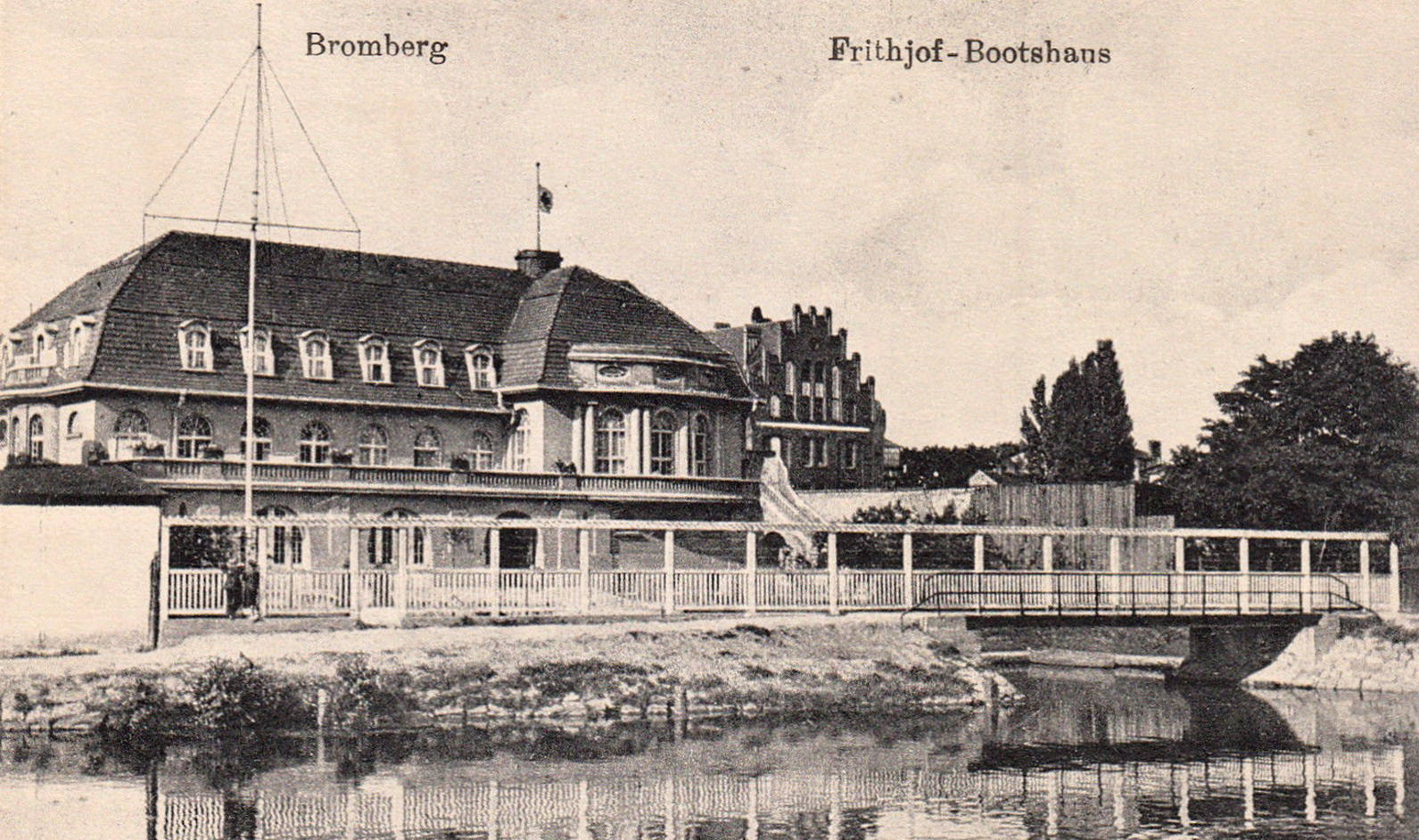
Rowing club "Frithjof", 1917

In addition to the family business, Feliks took part in the social life of the German community. He was passionate about sports, especially rowing. From 1935 to 1945, he chaired the board of the German rowing club "Frithjof" (German: Ruder-Club-Frithjof), founded in 1894. With the revival of the independent Polish state in 1918, the club lost many German members who left the country. In addition, "Frithjof" was not allowed to take part in Polish competitions. Feliks Kopp had the club join the "Polish Association of Rowing Societies", lifting the ban. Under its lead, the rowing association achieved many successes, winning the Polish championship and representing Poland in the Poland-Hungary international competition in 1938.

The club headquarters building is still standing today along the Brda river on Bernardyńska Street.

Feliks Kopp operated the plant in Bydgoszcz during almost the entire period of the Second World War. He left the city in January 1945, shortly before the arrival of the Red army. He eventually settled in Hamburg.

In Germany, he initiated the creation in 1960 of the "Frithjof" rowing club, which continued the traditions of the Bromberg Ruder-Club-Frithjof. He chaired the association between 1960 and 1964.

Feliks died on January 18, 1966, in Hamburg.

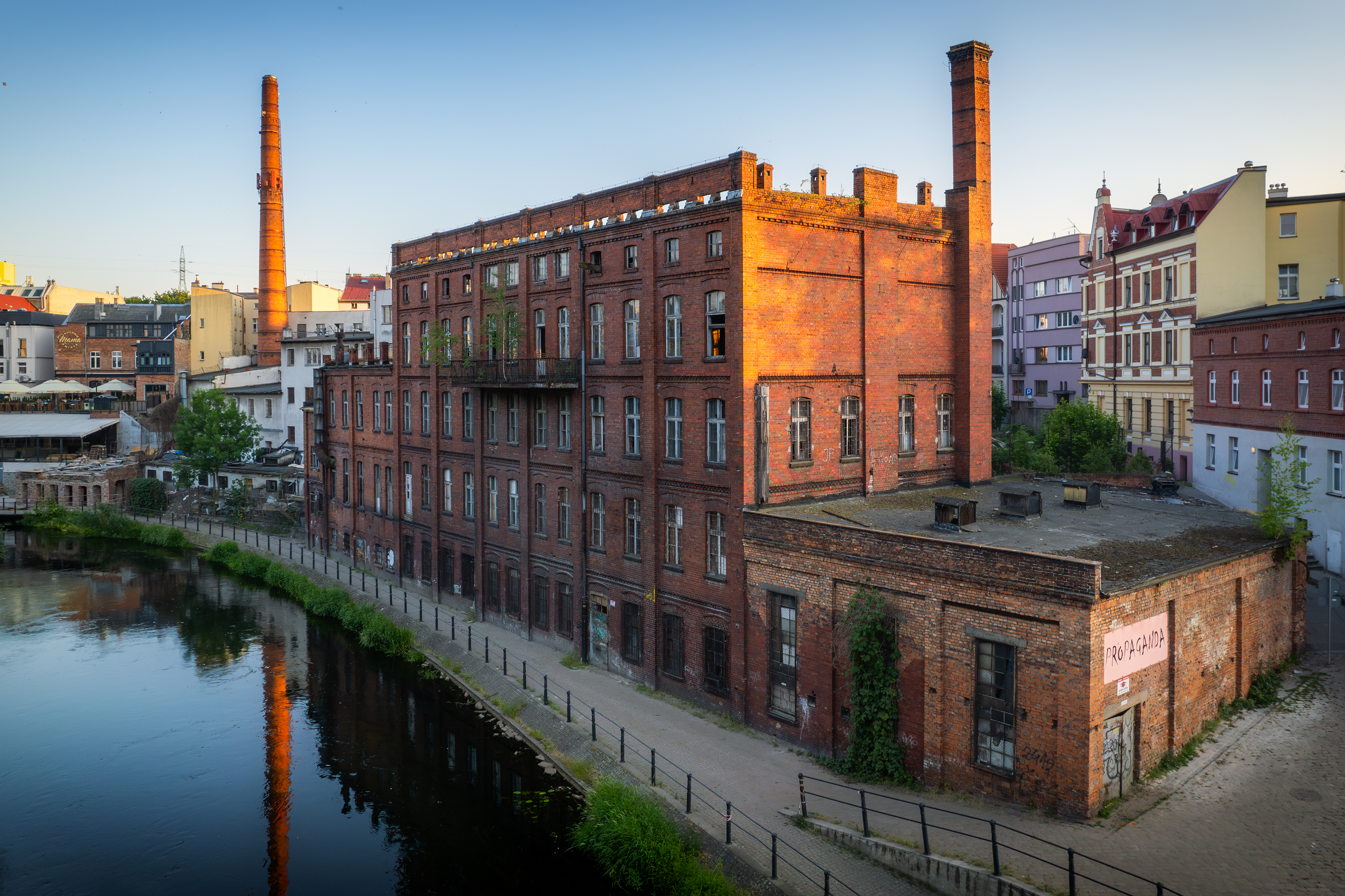
Ancient Kopp dyehouse facility

== Kopp's dyeing factory after WWII ==
After World War II the factory was nationalized under the name "Pralchem", operating through the Polish People's Republic period. In the 1990s, the business was closed.

Since then, several projects aiming at restoring the factory building have been proposed. The brick edifice has now become one of the hallmarks of the Mill Island area.

In 2022, a Polish estate agency, "NK Polska Development", purchased the edifice to build 52 apartments, with service and commercial areas on the ground floor. The construction is supposed to be delivered in 2025.

== Fragmentary family tree ==
- Johann Gottlieb Kopp (1850-1919) married Caroline Wilhelmine née Fenske
  - Wilhelm Gottlieb Kopp married Hermine Friederike Auguste née Heudtlass
    - Luise Auguste Charlotte (1871-?)
    - Wilhelm Rudolf Albert (1875-?)
    - Karl Gustav Emil (1877–?)
    - Julius Otto Friedrich (1879-?)
    - Anne Emme Olge (1881-?)
    - Paul Robert Johannes (1882-?)
    - Feliks Ernst Max (1884–1961) married in 1930 Erna Ada née Deylitz
      - Joachim Lothar (1931-?)
      - Tilo Manfred (1935-?)
    - Otto Theodor Traugott (1886-?)
    - Hellmuth Friedrich Wilhelm (1891-?)

== See also ==
- Bydgoszcz
- Mill Island, Bydgoszcz
- High School No. 1, Bydgoszcz
- Świętej Trójcy Street, Bydgoszcz

== Bibliography ==
- Błażejewski, Stanisław; Kutta, Janusz; Romaniuk, Marek (2006). Bydgoski Słownik Biograficzny. Tom VII [Bydgoszcz Biographical Dictionary. Volume VII] (in Polish). Bydgoszcz: Kujawsko-Pomorskie Towarzystwo Kulturalne. pp. 66–68. ISBN 83-85327-70-3.
