= Draba (disambiguation) =

Draba is a genus of plants.

Draba may also refer to:

- Draba (gladiator), a fictional character in the 1960 film Spartacus
- Robert Draba (born 1970), Polish lawyer and politician

== See also ==
- Drava, a river in Europe
