= Cyprian Kamil Norwid 1st Secondary School in Bydgoszcz =

Polish high School, Bydgoszcz (1619)

High School Nr.1 Cyprian Kamil Norwid in Bydgoszcz
- Polish: I Liceum Ogólnokształcące im. C. K. Norwida
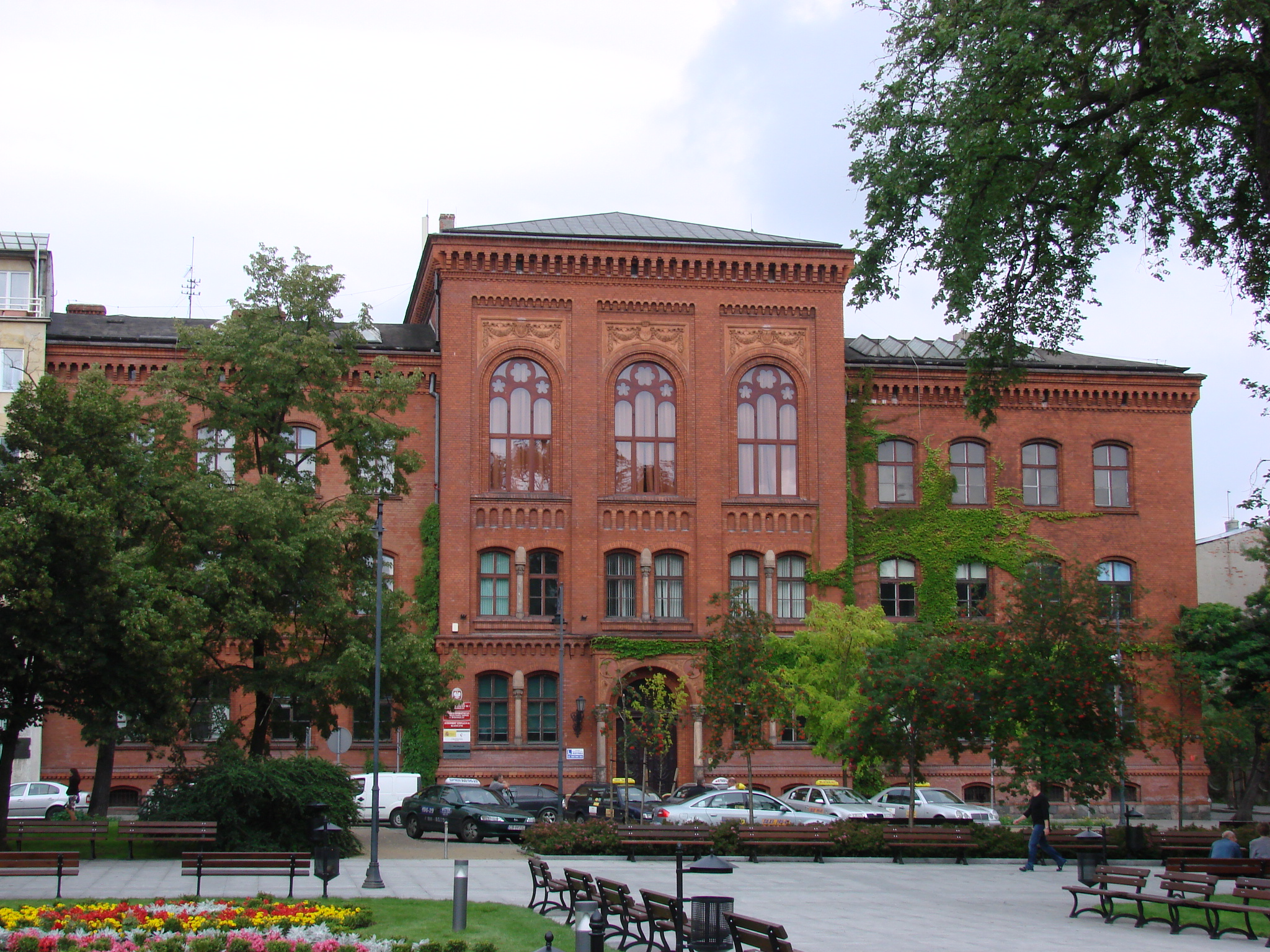
- Building of High School Nr.1

Location
- 9 Plac Wolności; Bydgoszcz, Kuyavian-Pomeranian Voivodeship; Poland
- Coordinates: 53°07′36″N 18°00′24″E

Information
- Type: Public
- Established: 1619

Cyprian Kamil Norwid High School Nr.1 in Bydgoszcz (Polish: I Liceum Ogólnokształcące im. Cypriana Kamila Norwida w Bydgoszczy) is a Polish general education liceum (high school) in Bydgoszcz, one of the oldest high schools in northern Poland, founded in 1619, located at 9 Freedom Square.

== History ==
=== Polish–Lithuanian Commonwealth (1619–1795) ===
High School Nr.1 in Bydgoszcz dates back from the reign of the House of Vasa with John II Casimir Vasa. It is a continuation of a school established by Jesuits in 1619. In 1623, college students welcomed king Sigismund III at the city's gate and in the school's hall during his stop in Bydgoszcz on his way to Gdańsk. In 1637, an old adjoining tenement market was purchased, to be refitted for educational purposes. Two years later, after the reconstruction and adaptation of the building, took place the inauguration ceremony of the school year. Lastly, in 1695 the construction of a new school magnificent building. At the time, the school had an impressive library. In the beginning only the lowest class was run: the class of grammar, in which was taught the basics of Latin and Greek. In 1642, a then called "class syntax" was established, where students were taught the full knowledge of grammar. At the special request of Prince George Ossoliński, a higher class in rhetoric and ethics was created in 1649.

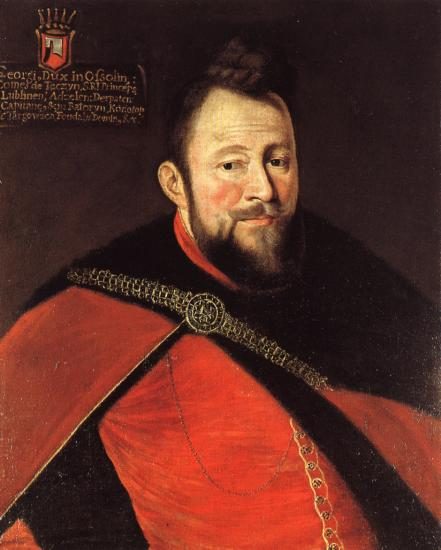
Prince George Ossoliński by Bartholomeus Strobel

The college was then known for organizing cultural events. Acting school theater often attend the ceremony to celebrate the city. Such was the case every time the Bydgoszcz governor was coming to his castle. A greater cultural event was even prepared in 1734 by young people and professors in honor of King Stanislaw Leszczynski riding to Gdansk.

=== Partitions of Poland (1772–1918) ===
Following the First Partition of Poland signed in St. Petersburg on August 5, 1772, Bydgoszcz was annexed by Prussia. In the following year the College of Bydgoszcz was converted into a gymnasium. The defeat of Prussia by Napoleon in 1806 lead to the creation of the Duchy of Warsaw, and on February 19, 1807, the takeover of Bydgoszcz under Polish rule became official. The city became the capital of a department (an administrative unit). Within the newly established College — so called Central School- a department of Polish language was created. The opening took place on 11 September 1808, during a ceremony where representatives of administrative department and military were present. The building, devastated by the previous war, was repaired with founds from the Board of Education Duchy of Warsaw and other contributions. At the same time, townspeople raised money to pay the salaries of the 6 professors. In September 1808, the school received 50 students. After a few years, the renown dignity of the Central School took over the old and successful High School in Toruń. During this period, the University of Bydgoszcz was deeply transformed into a real establishment of higher education. In September 1812, the famous writer and politician Julian Ursyn Niemcewicz visited the institution.

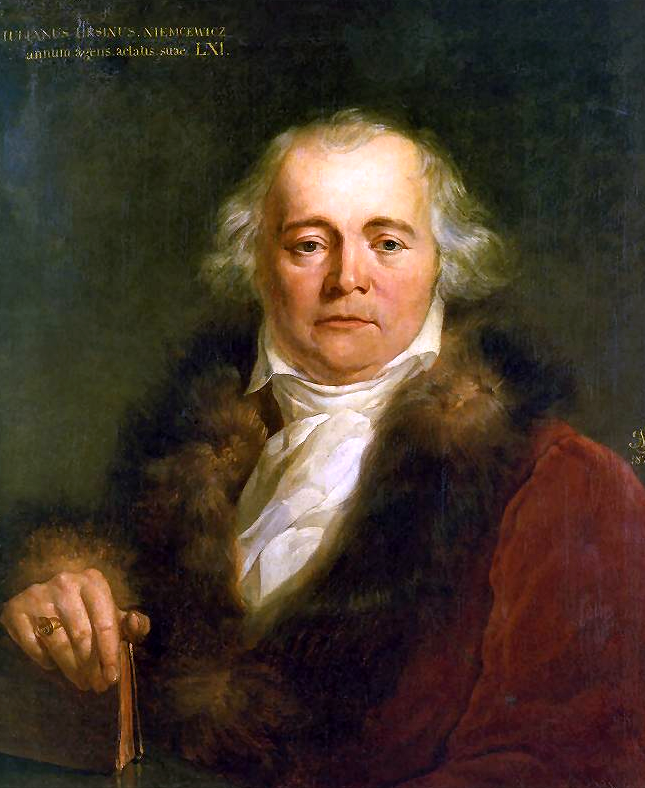
Julian Ursyn Niemcewicz

The Decision of Vienna Congress, liquidating Duchy of Warsaw and dividing its lands between the three partitioning powers, moved Bydgoszcz to the Kingdom of Prussia, as became the capital of one of the two new divisions of the prussian Grand Duchy of Posen. The stature of the city as a center of administrative and business increased, along with the development of education facilities, offering secondary education opportunities to Bydgoszcz inhabitants.

This school kept its Polish character, even though in the early years of Prussian rule students of German nationality prevailed. The meriting teaching staff was composed of rector Wilczewski, professor Szulc and teachers Bernhard and Królikowski. The language of instruction was Polish language. However, the level of education in German was very low due to the Polish origins of teaching staff. The School faculty, created a few years before, existed only for the first two years of Prussian rule.

On 30 September 1817, the school transformed into a six-year classic realschule (high school), whose graduates had the right to study at university campuses. In the spirit of the Prussian education, curriculum favored classical languages and Latin and Greek. This was done, of course, to the detriment of the natural sciences, mathematical and practical classes. After several years of existence, the number of students stabilized at about 250, including 40 students of Polish nationality. Those pupils were descendants of the noble families of the city and surrounding area. Indeed, high tuition fees prevented boys from poor origin to receive Polish education in middle school . As a result, the growing numbers of German families caused the true nature of the Polish school to gradually fade away.

Under the specific rule of the Prussian partition, education was a tool for germanization of society, notion which took over the classic realschule gymnasium pedagogical function. Director of the school was then German citizen Ludwig Müller, and among the teaching staff of eight only three Poles were left. Although initially a compulsory subject of teaching for all students, Polish language ceased to be the language of instruction. Until then, lessons in both languages were given, since only knowledge of both languages allowed to run for official posts in the Grand Duchy of Poznan. But, gradually, compulsory education Polish language underwent more and more restrictions until it was abandoned in 1829. This decision altogether lowered the spirit of the small number of Polish pupils in the city and strengthened the strong germanization in Bydgoszcz and its surrounding area.

Some students of Polish nationality, however, did not give up. In January 1833, Julian Mieczkowski founded a secret society with his student colleagues. Its goal was to develop patriotic feelings by self-learning Polish history and their mother tongue: Polish was still taught as an optional curriculum. In 1843, however, the new director Johann Heinrich Deinhardt put an end to this course. On 11 February 1844, a ministerial regulation authorized students of Polish nationality to access university, provided they demonstrated a good knowledge of the German.

During the Greater Poland Uprising of 1848, Polish students rushed took part as insurgents to fight for independence.

On August 1, 1878, after expansion works, the realschule re-opened in a new pseudo-Gothic edifice built on Freedom Square. It offered 18 classes and three elementary classes, housing more than 700 students. In addition, a preparatory grade called "preparandę" was created.

Less than a year before the rebirth of Poland, Bydgoszcz had a student population of 713 in middle school, including 121 Poles. Half a year later (20 October 1919) this number dropped down to 542 students, including 133 Poles, due to the massive outflow of Germans leaving the city, as well as the transfer of the German students to other middle schools.

=== Development of the school in 1920–1939 ===
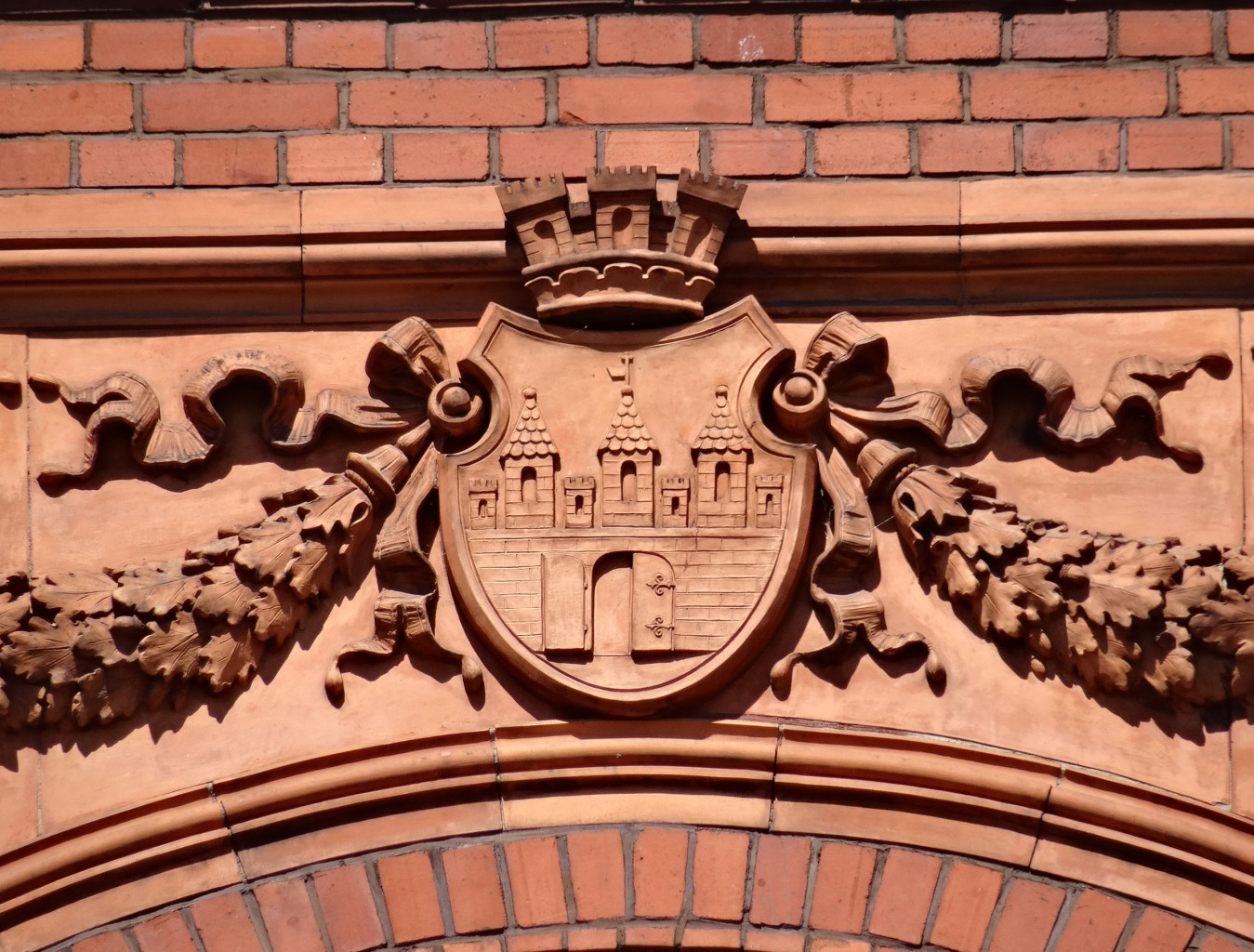
Relief of the coat of arms of Bydgoszcz on the façade

On 20 January 1920, thanks to the consequences of Treaty of Versailles, Bydgoszcz joined back the sovereign territory of Poland. After many years of captivity the city began a new period of its history and started developing high schools. The challenge was immense: lack of highly qualified teachers, lack of mastery of the mother tongue by the youth. At the end of January 1920, the Classical Grammar School was taken over by the Polish authorities. The newly appointed Polish director, Stanislaw Stóżewski, was welcomed by classes and several professors Polish. The school year ended on 30 March 1920 by a promotion ceremony. For the new school year, the school received the appellation of State Classical High School.

Curriculum included Polish language, Latin, Greek, English, mathematics, physics, history, geography, religion, physical education and singing. Young men exclusively were attending State Classical Grammar School. As soon as school year 1920/1921 started, a great care was put to acquire scientific equipments and class materiels, such as physics furniture or equipment for drawing room. the number labs increased almost every year. Much attention was devoted to re-equip the library collections.

Thanks to the efforts of the National Directorate of Classical High School in Bydgoszcz was built in Kościelisko a recreational facility for students where summer camps were held. Scout (Scouting) activities and rallies played an essential part in the teaching method. In 1934, the scout team won the title of "Team of the Republic". In 1920 Secondary High Rowing Association started its activities within the State High School Classic, organizing boat trips to Fordon, Ostromecko, Grudziądz, Toruń, Gdańsk and even Gdynia. The school taught extra courses, such as Esperanto, philology or drama. There was a school orchestra and choir. The effort required from the director and the teaching staff in this period was demanding. Zygmunt Polakowski was appointed as director in 1930. Between 1920 and 1939, the number of full-time teachers raised from 12 to 19, and the school received 488 graduates.

=== German occupation (1939–1945) ===
During the German occupation, school ceased its activity. In the first days of October 1939, several actions against teachers were carried out by occupying forces as part of the genocidal Intelligenzaktion campaign: 204 were arrested and underwent torture in the artillery barracks. 56 were shot in the Valley of Death in nearby Fordon. School principal Zygmunt Polakowski was also murdered there. As in other sites in occupied Poland, an underground education system was founded in 1939.

=== Post war period ===
High School resumed its activity on 4 March 1945 as a Secondary School. Beginning of school year 1948/49, a unified school from primary to high school was established. In 1961, a re-reorganization re-created the High School. The first baccalaureate was held in July 1945 year, graduating 75 students. Since then, High School Nr.1 in Bydgoszcz have graduated more than 9000 students.

Since October 1978, the school is a member of the UNESCO Associated Schools Project Network, and since October 1994, the school is a member of the Association of Polish Active Schools. High School Nr.1 in Bydgoszcz maintains close contacts with other high schools in Europe including:

- IES Monte Castelo, Burela, Spain;
- Fenix Kunskapscentrum Verner Malmstensväg 1, Vaggeryd, Sweden;
- Filekpadefiki Eteria - The Arsakeio of Patras, Patras, Greece;
- Lycée Polyvalent Bellevue, Toulouse, France;
- Deutsch-Polnische Gesellschaft, Mannheim, Germany;
- Adams' Grammar School, Newport, United Kingdom.

On 1 February 1949 the School was named after Ludwik Waryński. On 24 September 1992, it was renamed after Cyprian Norwid. It is currently the largest school in Kuyavia-Pomerania. From 1 September 2007, the High School became Secondary School Nr.1 ("I L.O.") in Bydgoszcz, including High School Nr.1 "Cyprian Norwid and Classical Grammar School. High School Nr.1 is the oldest high school in Bydgoszcz. On December 1, 2015, a ceremony to unveil, beside the entry gate, a plaque in memoriam to Marian Rejewski happened.

== Directors since 1945 ==
- Czesław Zgodziński (4.03.1945-30.11.1948)
- Ludwik Kosiński (1.12.1948-15.12.1949)
- Leon Hartman (16.12.1949-31.08.1950)
- Feliks Kaute (1.09.1950-31.08.1968)
- Eugeniusz Wyroda (1.09.1968-31.05.1976)
- Wiesława Dymel (1.06.1976-31.08.1982)
- Jan Szpara (1.09 1982-31.08.2003)
- Jarosław Durszewicz (1.09.2003-31.08.2012)
- Mariola Mańkowska (since 1.09.2012)

High school students gained several titles of winners and finalists of national contests such as the Olympic Games of the Polish language or the International Olympiad in Informatics

== Activities ==
I L.O. takes part to the educational program "Odyssey of the Mind" and performs many foreign exchange with students from schools of Swedish, English, German, Greek and Spanish.

One important event at the I L.O. is the National Festival of Artistic Young Talents, whose tradition dates back more than 20 years.

== Notable alumni ==
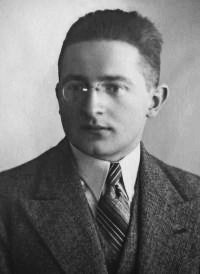
Marian Rejewski circa 1932

- Emil Warmiński (1881-1909) – physician, Polish social and national activist and founder of the Polish House in Bydgoszcz
- Marian Rejewski (1905-1980) – mathematician cryptologist; in 1932, he solved the plugboard-equipped Enigma machine, the main cipher device used by Germany; graduated in 1923.
- Maciej Konopacki (1926-2020), social activist of Tatar origin, patriarch of the Polish Orient. He was the son of Hasan Konopacki; graduated in 1948.
- Jerzy Hoffman (1932-) – film director and screenwriter; graduated in 1950.
- Radosław Sikorski (1963-) – politician, former Polish Minister of Defence (2005-2007), former Polish Minister of Foreign Affairs (2007-2014); graduated in 1981.
- Max Kolonko (1965-) – producer, writer, author, broadcast journalist and U.S. correspondent for several television news organizations; graduated in 1981.
- Piotr Salaber (1966-) – composer, pianist and conductor; graduated in 1984.
- Paweł Olszewski (1979-)– economist and politician, MP since 2005; graduated in 1998.
- Roma Gąsiorowska (1981-) - actress and fashion designer; graduated in 2000.

== Gallery ==
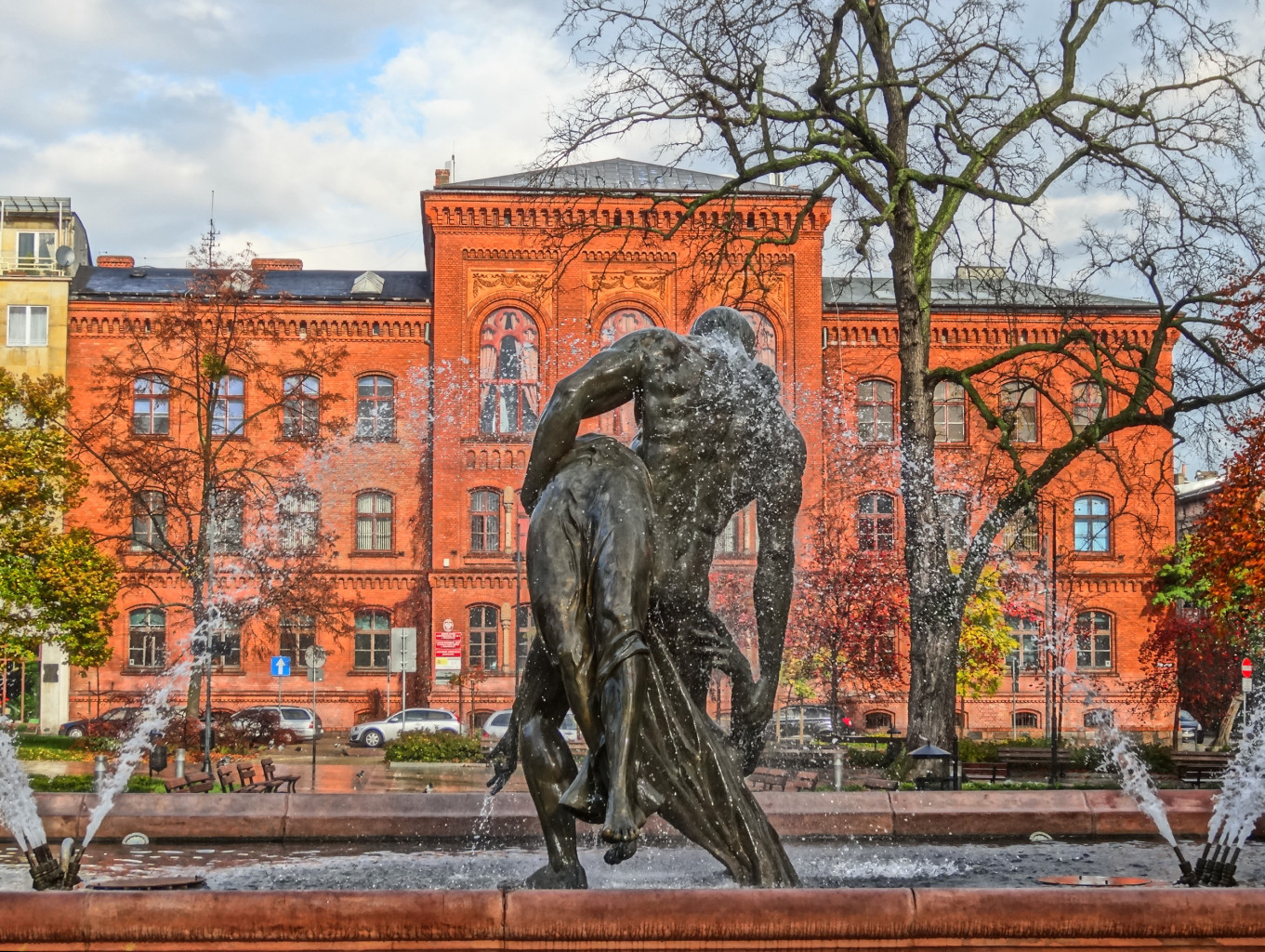
View with Fountain Potop on the foreground

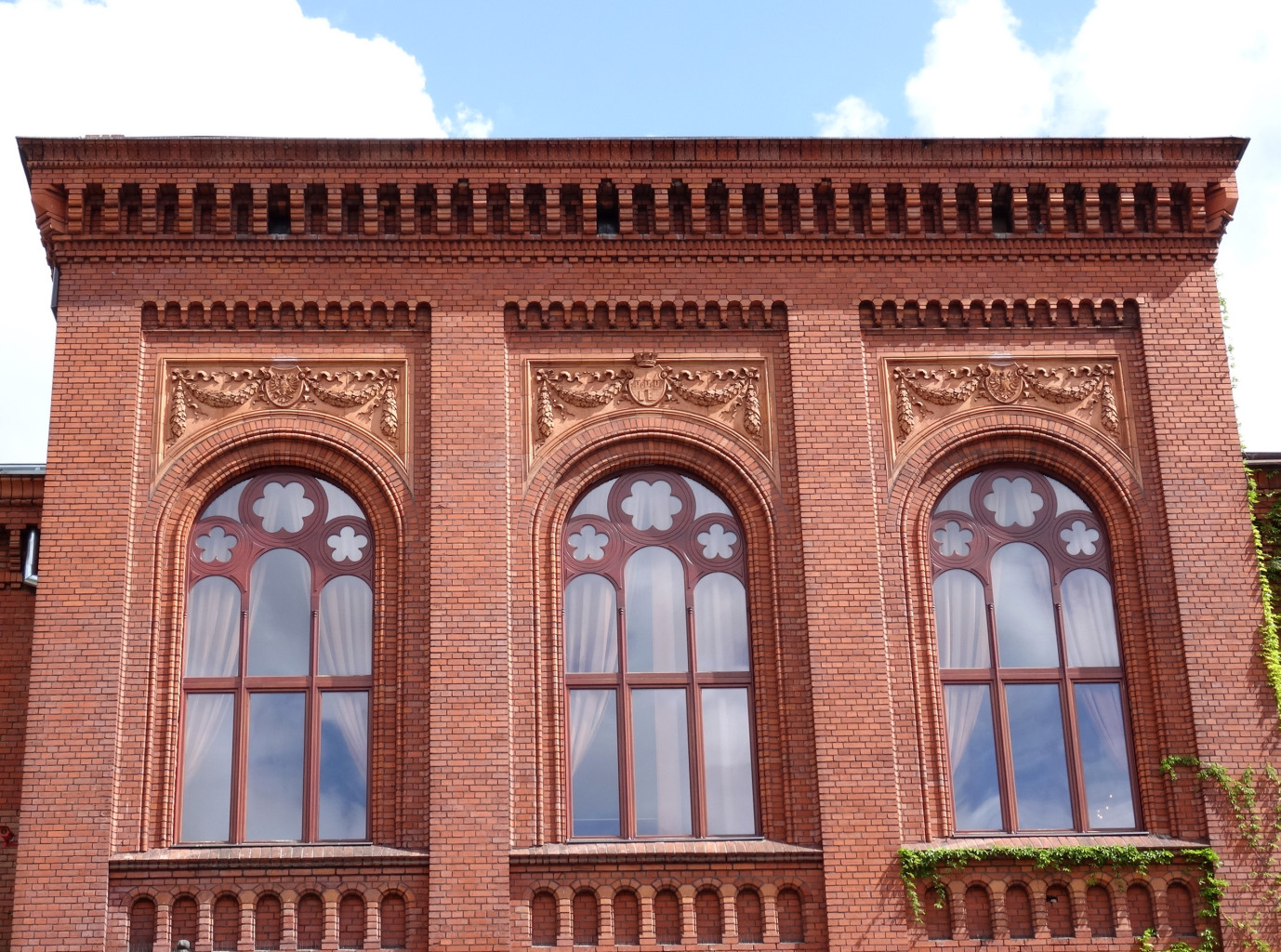
Detail of the windows of the main hall

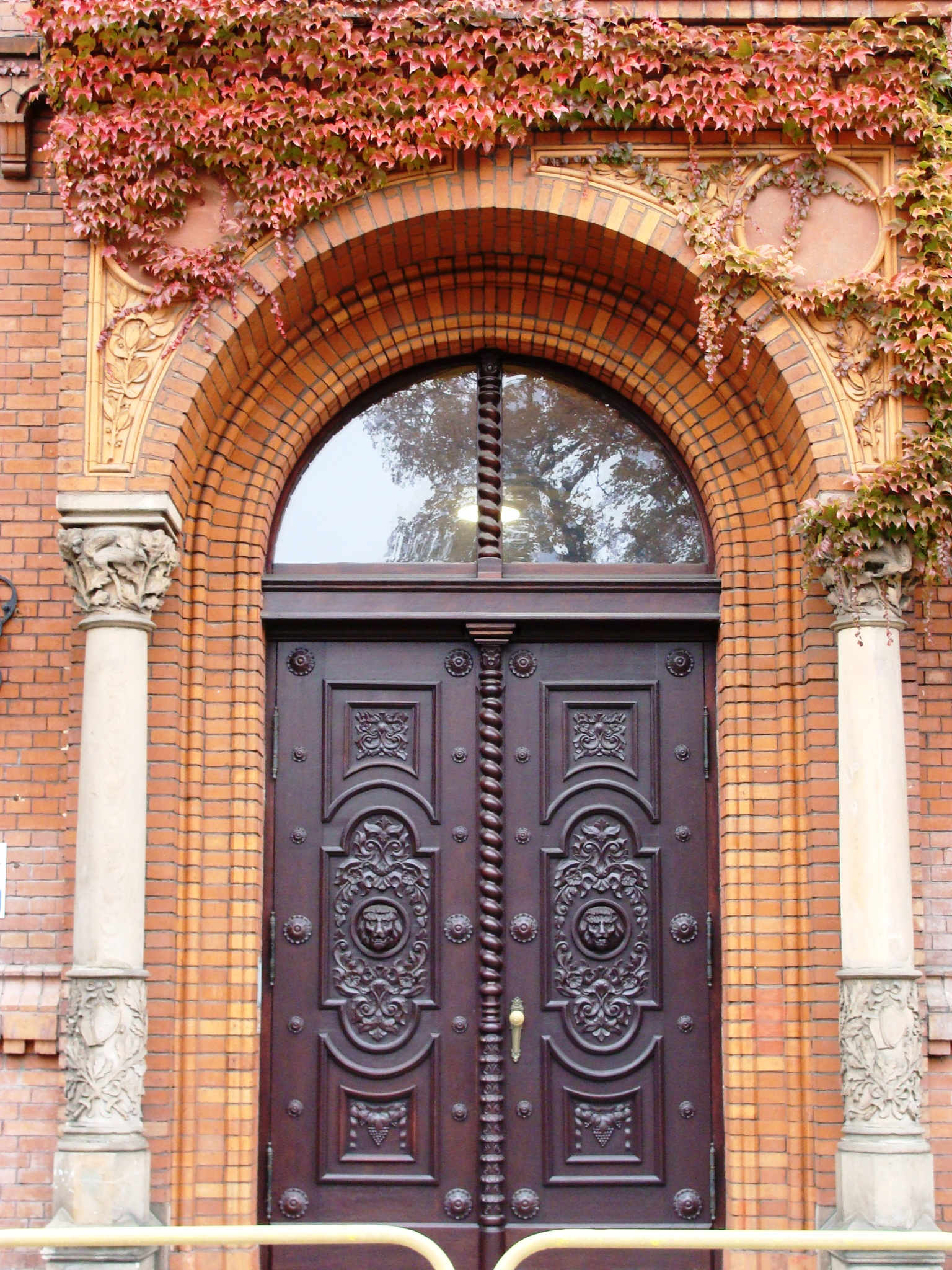
Main gate adorned with lions' heads

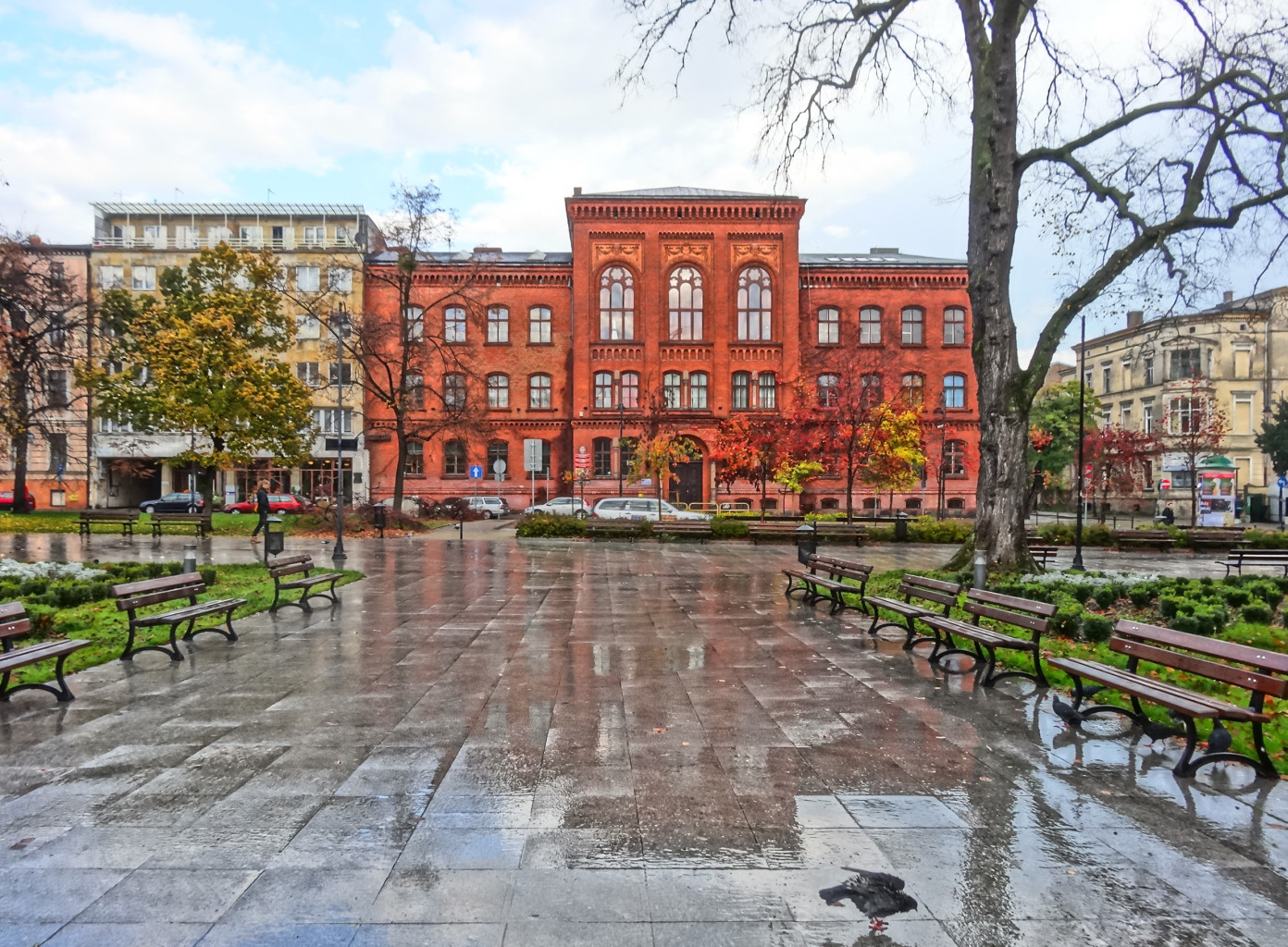
View from Plac Wolnosci

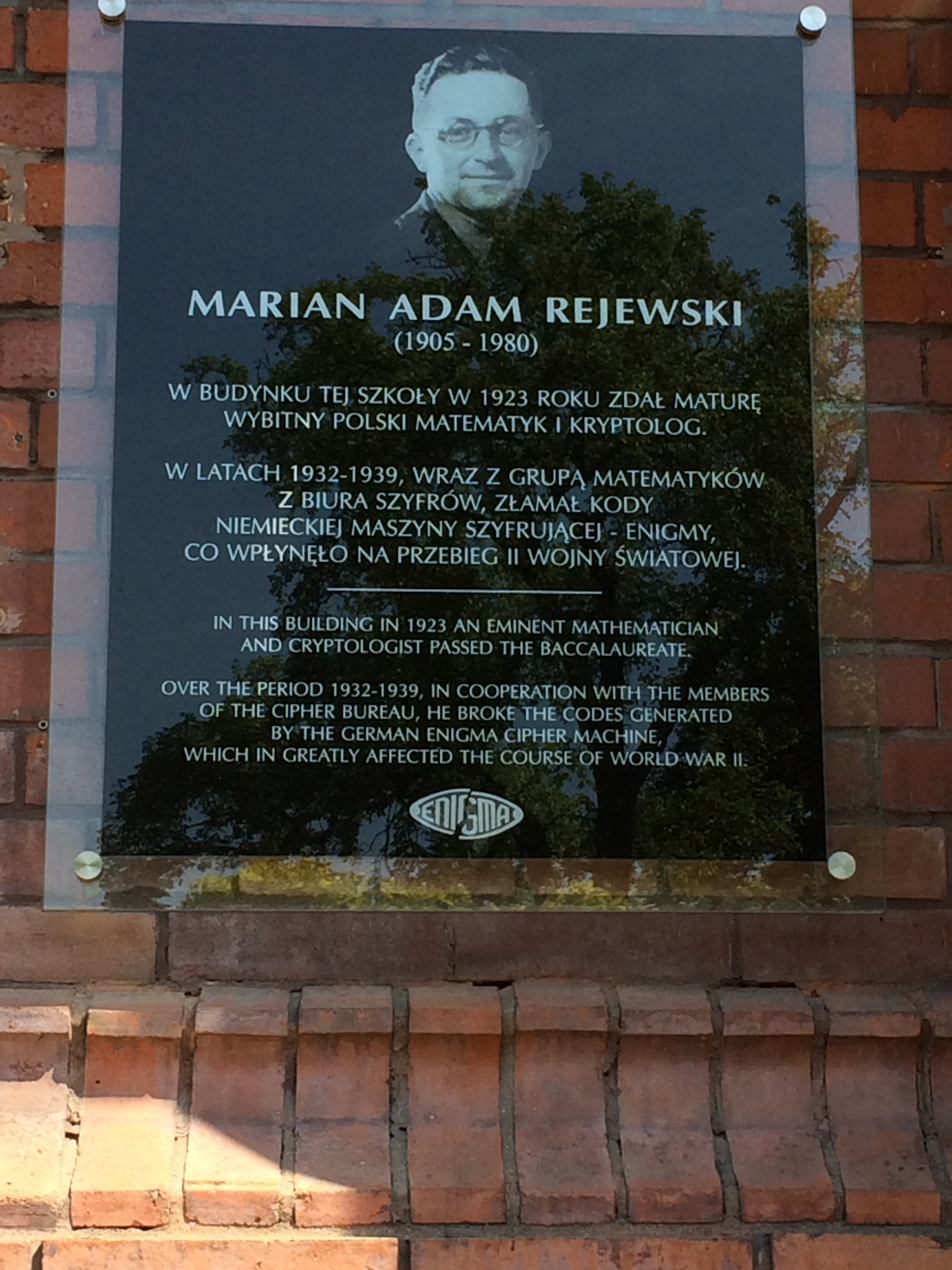
Plaque in memoriam to Marian Rejewski

== See also ==
- Freedom Square in Bydgoszcz
- Gdańska Street, Bydgoszcz
- St Peter's and St Paul's Church, Bydgoszcz
- Casimir the Great Park
- Freedom Monument, Bydgoszcz
- Tenement at Freedom Square 1, Bydgoszcz
