= Radosław Sikorski =

Polish politician and journalist (born 1963)

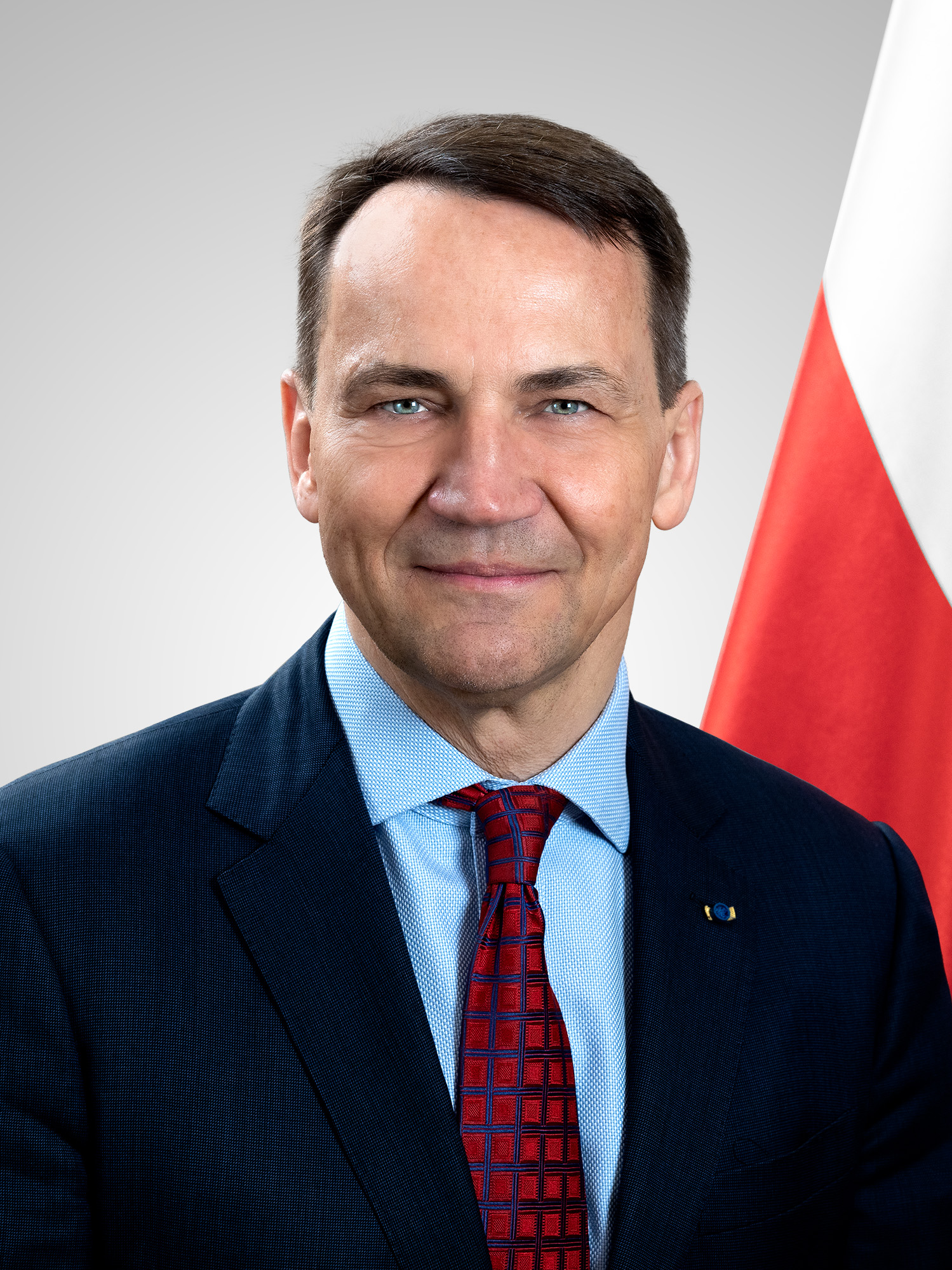
- Official portrait, 2024

Deputy Prime Minister of Poland
- Incumbent
- Assumed office 24 July 2025 Serving with Władysław Kosiniak-Kamysz and Krzysztof Gawkowski
- Prime Minister: Donald Tusk

Minister of Foreign Affairs
- Incumbent
- Assumed office 13 December 2023
- Prime Minister: Donald Tusk
- Preceded by: Szymon Szynkowski vel Sęk
- In office 16 November 2007 – 22 September 2014
- Prime Minister: Donald Tusk
- Preceded by: Anna Fotyga
- Succeeded by: Grzegorz Schetyna

Minister of National Defence
- In office 31 October 2005 – 7 February 2007
- Prime Minister: Kazimierz Marcinkiewicz; Jarosław Kaczyński
- Preceded by: Jerzy Szmajdziński
- Succeeded by: Aleksander Szczygło
Parliamentary offices
Member of the European Parliament for Poland
In office 2 July 2019 – 12 December 2023
Marshal of the Sejm
In office 24 September 2014 – 23 June 2015
Preceded by	Ewa Kopacz
Succeeded by	Małgorzata Kidawa-Błońska
Member of the Sejm
In office 5 November 2007 – 12 November 2015
Parliamentary group	Civic Platform
Constituency	Bydgoszcz
Member of the Senate
In office 20 October 2005 – 5 November 2007
Parliamentary group	Law and Justice
Constituency	Bydgoszcz

Personal details
- Born: Radosław Tomasz Sikorski; 23 February 1963 (age 63) Bydgoszcz, Poland
- Citizenship: Poland; United Kingdom (1987–2006)
- Party: Civic Coalition (party) (since 2025); Civic Platform (2007–2025); Law and Justice (2005–2007)
- Other political affiliations: Civic Coalition (coalition) (since 2018)
- Spouse: Anne Applebaum (m. 1992)
- Children: 2
- Education: Pembroke College, Oxford (BA), (MA)

Radosław Tomasz "Radek" Sikorski (Note: [raˈdɔswaf ɕiˈkɔrskʲi]) (born 23 February 1963) is a Polish politician, journalist and statesman who has been Polish Minister of Foreign Affairs since 2023, previously holding the office between 2007 and 2014, which makes him the person to serve longest in the office. Since 2025, he has also been serving as Deputy Prime Minister. He was a Member of the European Parliament between 2019 and 2023. Earlier he was Marshal of the Sejm from 2014 to 2015. He previously served as Deputy Minister of National Defence in 1992 in Jan Olszewski's cabinet, Deputy Minister of Foreign Affairs between 1998 and 2001 in Jerzy Buzek's cabinet and Minister of National Defence between 2005 and 2007 in the cabinets of Kazimierz Marcinkiewicz and Jarosław Kaczyński.

A graduate of Pembroke College, Oxford, Sikorski worked as a journalist for The Observer and The Spectator between 1986 and 1989. He was a war correspondent in Afghanistan in 1986, then in Angola in 1989. Being a Bilderberg Group regular, he is on its key Steering Committee; Sikorski was also part of the conservative think tank American Enterprise Institute between 2003 and 2005. In 2012, he was included on the list of Top 100 Global Thinkers 2012 published by the Foreign Policy magazine. In 2015, Sikorski became a Senior Fellow at the Center for European Studies of Harvard University. In 2025 he became an Honorary Fellow at the Pembroke College, his alma mater. He is a Senior Network Member at the European Leadership Network (ELN). He is a member of the Civic Coalition (formerly Civic Platform), in which he is seen as being part of the party's right wing.

== Early life and education ==
Born in Bydgoszcz, Sikorski served as chairman of the local student strike committee in March 1981 while studying at the I Liceum Ogólnokształcące (High School). He travelled to the United Kingdom to study English in June 1981. After martial law was declared in December 1981, he was granted political asylum in Britain in 1982. He studied Philosophy, Politics and Economics at Pembroke College, University of Oxford.

During his time at Oxford, Sikorski was head of the Standing Committee of the debating society, the Oxford Union (where he organised debates on martial law), president of the Oxford University Polish Society, member of the Canning Club, and was elected to the Bullingdon Club, a dining society that counted among its members future British Prime Minister, David Cameron, future Chancellor George Osborne, and future Prime Minister Boris Johnson. His articles were published in prestigious Polish émigré magazines as well as Britain's Sunday Telegraph and Tatler magazines. He graduated in 1986. In 1987, Sikorski acquired British citizenship, which he renounced in 2006 upon being named Minister of Defence of Poland.

== Career ==
=== Journalism (1985–1992) ===
In the mid-1980s, Sikorski worked as a freelance journalist for publications such as The Spectator and The Observer. He also wrote for the Indian newspaper The Statesman of Kolkata. In 1986, he travelled in Afghanistan, as he stated in his book, "to write about the war the mujahideen were waging against the Soviet Union". While a war correspondent for The Sunday Telegraph, he brought out the first report and photographs of the US Stinger missiles, whose use was a turning point in the war.

In 1987, Sikorski made a hundred-day journey under Soviet bombardment to the ancient city of Herat, Afghanistan. He won the 1st prize singles in the category Spot News of World Press Photo Awards in 1988 for a photograph of a family killed and mummified in their home as a result of a Soviet Air Force bombing raid.

His adventures were presented in the documentary "Polish Mujahideen: Radosław Sikorski", produced by Discovery Channel. Sikorski described his perilous journey to Herat in his first book Dust of the Saints: A Journey to Herat in Time of War.

In 1989, he became the chief foreign correspondent for the U.S. conservative magazine National Review, reporting from Afghanistan and Angola. He received praise for his article published in January 1989, "The coming crack-up of Communism", which proved prophetic. His article describing an ambush on the Benguela Highway conducted by Jonas Savimbi's UNITA rebels attracted widespread interest.

In 1990–91, he was the Warsaw correspondent for The Sunday Telegraph. He was the author of the Interview of the Month program on the public Polish TV, in which he interviewed Margaret Thatcher, Lech Wałęsa, Václav Klaus, Otto von Habsburg, Henry Kissinger, Qian Qichen and others.

=== Deputy Minister in Olszewski and Buzek governments (1992–2001) ===
Sikorski returned to Poland in August 1989. He briefly served as deputy defence minister in the Jan Olszewski government in 1992, in which he helped launch the Polish bid to join NATO. From 1998 to 2001, Sikorski served as undersecretary of state at the ministry of foreign affairs in the Jerzy Buzek's government, being deputy first to Bronisław Geremek, and then to Władysław Bartoszewski. He oversaw the consular service and initiated reforms of services for Poles abroad. He signed agreements to abolish visas with countries in Asia, Africa and Latin America, Singapore and Israel among them. He was Honorary Chairman of the Foundation for Assistance to Poles in the East.

During his time as a Deputy Foreign Minister, Sikorski focused on reforms inside the Ministry and started the campaign to protest the use of the misleading term "Polish concentration camps" in western media. He introduced the "cheap visa" program for Poland's Eastern neighbors and started the recovery of post-Soviet properties in Warsaw. He introduced competitions for posts of heads of Polish Institutes abroad. When Ted Turner made a demeaning joke about Poles in a Washington speech, Sikorski demanded an apology and Turner complied. Sikorski's appeal to Polish nationals with dual citizenship to use the passport of the country they were visiting caused some controversy among the Polish expatriate community, but has now become an established practice.

=== Policy analyst in the US (2002–2005) ===
From 2002 to 2005, Sikorski was a resident fellow of the American Enterprise Institute in Washington, D.C., and executive director of the New Atlantic Initiative. He was editor of the analytical publication European Outlook, having organised international conferences, including the "Ronald Reagan – Legacy for Europe" in 2003, during which prominent politicians from Eastern Europe discussed the impact the U.S. president left on the world. Other major conferences included 25th Anniversary of the birth of Solidarity, "Axis of Evil: Belarus – The Missing Link" and "Ukraine's Choice" at the time of the Orange Revolution.

=== Minister of National Defence (2005–2007) ===
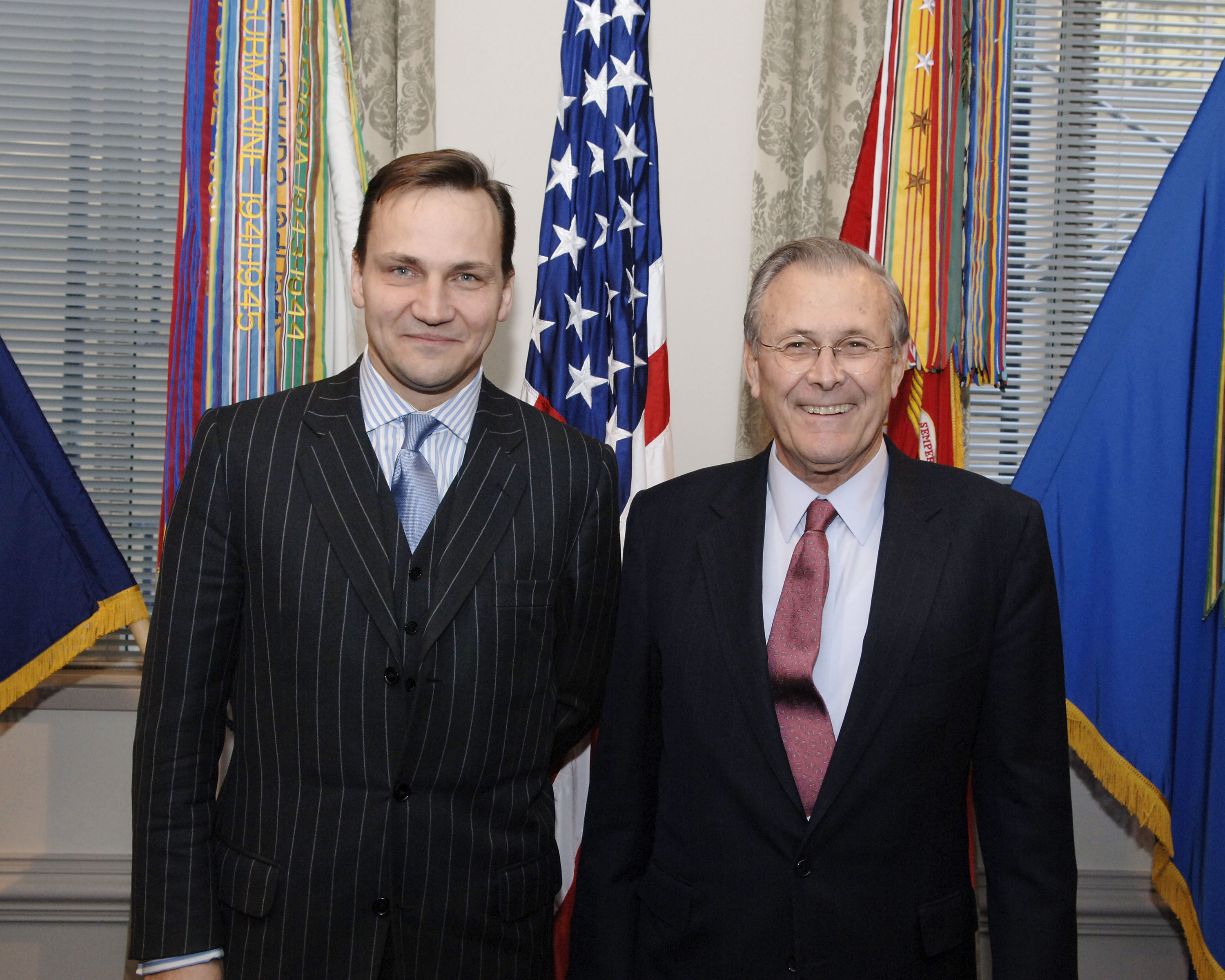
Sikorski with US Secretary of Defense Donald Rumsfeld in December 2005

In 2005, Sikorski returned to Poland and was elected senator from his home town of Bydgoszcz with 76,370 votes. He joined Prime Minister Marcinkiewicz's government as Minister of National Defence on 31 October. During his time in MoD, he moved Warsaw Pact-era files to the Institute of National Remembrance, declassified Warsaw Pact maps which demonstrated Soviet plans to use nuclear weapons in an offensive war against NATO and cancelled the military pension of Helena Wolińska-Brus, a Stalin-era prosecutor who sentenced the anti-communist Polish resistance general August Emil "Nil" Fieldorf to death. He introduced electronic auctions in procurement for defence equipment, saving the ministry a great amount of money. He announced the tender to buy a fleet of new jets for government transportation. He declassified a file of an operation codenamed "Szpak" (starling) by the Military Information Services (Wojskowe Służby Informacyjne, WSI) which documented their operations against him containing transcripts of the bugging of his home and telephone as well as hostile articles in the media inspired by WSI operatives.

Sikorski resigned on 5 February 2007, on the eve of Poland's engagement in the war in Afghanistan in protest against the activities of the chief of military intelligence, Antoni Macierewicz. Though never a member of the Law and Justice party, he served out the parliamentary term in the Law and Justice Senatorial Club. In the early parliamentary elections of 2007, he was elected to the Lower House (Sejm) with 117,291 votes, one of 10 best results in the country.

=== Minister of Foreign Affairs (2007–2014) ===
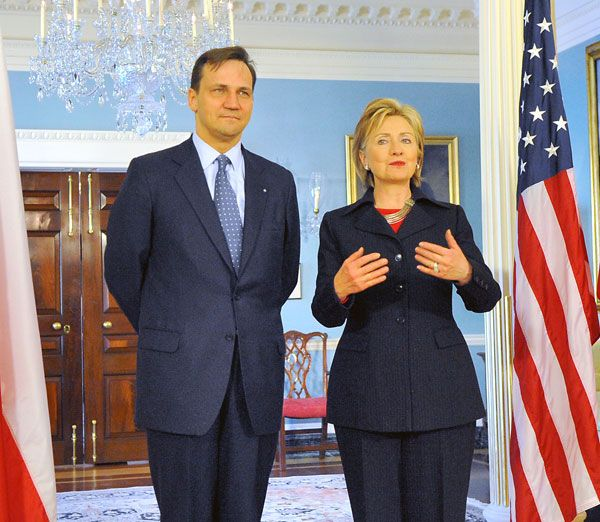
Sikorski and Secretary of State Hillary Clinton in 2009

Sikorski was sworn in as Minister of Foreign Affairs in Donald Tusk's government on 16 November 2007, succeeding Anna Fotyga. He joined Donald Tusk's liberal-conservative Civic Platform party and became a member of the Civic Platform national board in 2008.

Sikorski's policies are best understood in his annual statement to the Sejm (Parliament). Each one was followed by a day-long debate. As Minister of Foreign Affairs, Sikorski normalized relations with Russia, and helped to terminate the Russian embargo on Polish agricultural products. In 2009, Sikorski said that Russia is needed to solve the problems of European and global theatre. Therefore, if Russia could fulfil the conditions, it could apply to join NATO. He restated NATO criteria that Russia would have to meet are: be a democratic state, have civilian control over the army, and to settle any territorial disputes with its neighbours. At the same time, he enhanced relations with Germany and France. Cooperation in the Weimar Triangle – Poland, Germany, France – was particularly intense during his term of office. Weimar Triangle meetings included consultations with third parties, such as Ukraine, Moldova and Russia.

As foreign minister, he turned the ministry into a global institution with 4500 employees and 100 foreign branches. Over seven years his ministry carried out various reforms, introducing the Diplomatic Security Service, global digital secure communications, ISO standards in procedures, electronic document management, a blackberry and laptop for every diplomat, a satellite phone for every posting, new visual standards book; The Foreign Service Day, a dress code, the Bene Merito honorary badge, The Polish Institute of Diplomacy, Poland's Lech Wałęsa Solidarity Prize (worth 1 mln EUR); reduced the number of chancelleries in the MFA HQ from over 30 to 2, reformed the telegram and courier systems, reduced employment while raising salaries; quadrupled ambassadors and consuls operational funds, closed down 30 embassies and consulates and opened several new ones; he opened a Polish consulate in Sevastopol, the only one representing a Western country in that city for four years; built a new EU embassy in Brussels, a new Embassy residence in Washington, DC, a new Consulate-General in London; he moved consulates in Cologne, Manchester and Madrid; he created the MFA committee on cyber defence; the European Endowment for Democracy (EED), authorized intelligence operations. During Sikorski's term in office he was a regular visitor in Moscow and his Russian counterpart Foreign Minister, Sergei Lavrov visited Warsaw regularly. Sikorski made his first visit in Moscow in 2008 with Donald Tusk. In 2009 he visited Moscow to enhance Polish-Russian cooperation. During one of Lavrov's visits, he engaged in Q&A session with Polish diplomats during MFA annual global ambassadors conference.

In 2008, Sikorski concluded a long negotiation with the U.S. over the siting of a missile defence base in Poland. He insisted on Polish jurisdiction over base personnel and asked the U.S. to enhance Poland's air defences as part of the deal. The agreement was finally signed with the U.S. Secretary of State, Condoleezza Rice, over the objections of Russia. The agreement came less than two weeks after the outbreak of the 2008 Russo-Georgian South Ossetian war. On 17 September 2009, the Obama administration changed the plans for the base. The annex to the agreement, which envisages shorter-range missiles capable of defending Poland's territory was signed in the presence of Sikorski and Secretary of State, Hillary Clinton on 3 June 2010 in Kraków.

In March 2010, Sikorski took part in the Civic Platform Presidential primaries against the then Sejm Speaker, Bronisław Komorowski, who went on to defeat the late Lech Kaczyński's brother Jarosław and becoming president. At that time, Sikorski enjoyed some of the highest approval and trust ratings among Polish politicians.

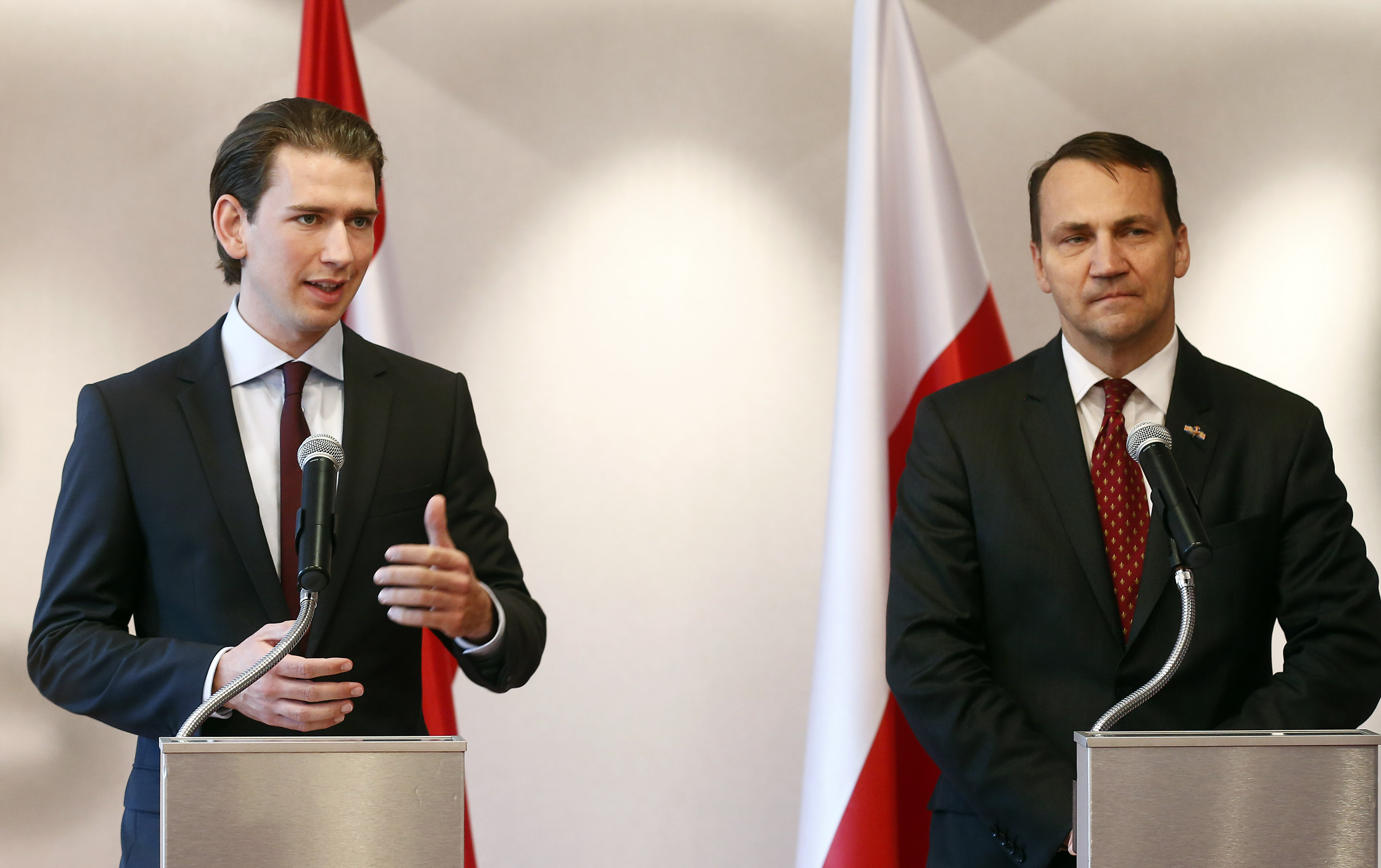
Radosław Sikorski with Austrian Foreign Minister Sebastian Kurz in 2014

At the height of the European sovereign debt crisis in November 2011, Sikorski delivered a speech in Berlin: "Poland and the future of the European Union" in front of the German Council on Foreign Relations, the prestigious non-profit organization composed of the German foreign policy elite. He warned that EU member states faced a choice "between deeper economic integration or collapse of the Eurozone". Sikorski made an extraordinary appeal: "I will probably be the first Polish foreign minister in history to say so, but here it is: I fear German power less than I am beginning to fear German inactivity". Sikorski labelled Germany Europe's "indispensable nation" and appealed to Germany to lead in saving the euro, offering Poland's support. According to many political commentators and journalists, this speech made a tremendous impact on German and European politics, not least because it changed the perception of Poland: from a problematic and needy recipient of Western support to a full-fledged member of the European Union.

Sikorski was involved in the events of the winter 2014 Ukraine Euromaidan protests at the international level. He signed on 21 February along with Ukrainian President Viktor Yanukovych and opposition leaders Vitali Klitschko, Arseniy Yatsenyuk, and Oleh Tyahnybok, as well as the Foreign Ministers of Russia, France and Germany, a memorandum of understanding to promote peaceful changes in Ukrainian power.

==== Views on the Holocaust ====
In a February 2011 interview with Israeli journalist Adar Primor, Sikorski declared: "Nazi Germany carried out the Holocaust on our soil – against our will, but in front of our eyes". He also said: "Last time I checked the definition of the Holocaust, it was said to be a phenomenon in which a state uses industrial methods to eradicate an entire ethnic group. Horrendous events took place in Poland; there were periods during the Holocaust when people behaved heroically and others behaved like scum, but the Holocaust was the creation of the German state. We mustn't be confused about that". The extent of collaboration in German-occupied Poland remains a matter of historical debate.

==== Leaked conversations about geopolitics ====
In June 2014, a magazine in Poland published redacted transcripts of an illegally taped conversation between Sikorski and the former Polish finance minister Jacek Rostowski. The recordings were believed to have been made in the dining room of the Polish Business Council sometime between summer 2013 and spring 2014. Sikorski is heard criticizing the British Prime Minister David Cameron for his handling of the EU's fiscal pact to appease Eurosceptics in the Conservative Party.

In another part of the leaked conversation, Sikorski was reported to have said: "The Polish-American alliance is worthless. It is even harmful because it creates a false sense of security for Poland." In the fragment of the record Sikorski said: "We're going to antagonize Germany and Russia, and they will think that everything is ok because we have given a blowjob to the Americans. Losers. Total losers." Sikorski stated later that in the actual conversation, he was predicting what Polish foreign policy would look like under a Law and Justice government. Sikorski argued that the tapes, which did not contain any evidence of illegality, were part of an organized attack on the government: "The Government was attacked by an organized criminal group. We are not sure who is behind it, but I hope its members will be identified and punished." He had favored NATO military bases in Poland and the Baltic states.

==== Ukraine ====
As Poland's Minister of Foreign Affairs, Sikorski was a strong supporter of closer ties with the EU's Eastern Neighbors. He opted for the integration of those countries into European structures, advocated anchoring Ukraine within the European Union and called for economic changes in Belarus. Sikorski was the main architect, along with his Swedish counterpart and friend Carl Bildt, of the eastern policy of the EU – which came to be called the Eastern Partnership. Sikorski was also a supporter of the opening of EU borders to Ukraine and the Russian exclave of Kaliningrad by means of Local Border Traffic (LBT) agreements. Thanks to those agreements, citizens of neighbouring regions may travel visa-free in Poland. The agreement with Russia was signed by Sikorski and the Foreign Minister of Russia, Sergey Lavrov, on 14 December 2011. It entered into force in July 2012 and has been kept in place despite worsening of relations in other areas.

Sikorski took on a leading role as European politician during the Maidan crisis in February 2014, which was sparked by refusal of signing the EU-Ukraine Association Agreement by since-deposed Ukrainian president Viktor Yanukovich. After the events of the Euromaidan in May 2014, Sikorski labeled pro-Russian separatists as "terrorists". On 16 July, shortly after publicly accusing Russia of supporting for separatist rebels in Ukraine, as well as before an EU summit on whether to impose sanctions on Russia, Sikorski flew to Kyiv to meet with Ukraine's Foreign Minister, Pavlo Klimkin, where he argued that sanctions should be imposed on Russia.

==== Campaign for EU HRUFASP ====
On 1 August 2014, Sikorski was nominated for the post of High Representative of the Union for Foreign Affairs and Security Policy (HRUFASP). Sikorski had been a strong supporter of sanctions against Russia, in contrast to his top opponent for the position, Federica Mogherini. On 3 August, Sikorski told CNN's Fareed Zakaria that the Malaysia Airlines Flight 17 crash had helped bring European leaders together against Russia. He noted the sanctions will cause economic "losses all around", especially for Poland, but declared that Europe cannot "stand silently by when Russia annexes, for the first time since the Second World War, a neighbour's province. And now supplying sophisticated weaponry to the separatists." He called for more NATO troops in Poland and prepositioning of its equipment, as well as standing defence plans and bigger response forces. On 30 August, Polish Prime Minister Donald Tusk was appointed President of the European Council and Mogherini prevailed over Sikorski.

When later questioned, Sikorski called it "undoubtedly the prime minister's personal success but equally a success of Poland. We take this decision as both a signal of appreciation of the policies Poland has pursued over ten years of its EU membership and a sign that the distinctions between 'old' and 'new' member states are rapidly crumbling. On the 10th anniversary of Poland's accession to the EU, a Pole will lead the institution which sets the priorities of Europe." One such priority, according to Sikorski, is "a well-interconnected network of energy infrastructure and more efficient security of supply mechanisms." He backed Tusk's proposed pan-European "Energy Union" plan.

In September 2015, after leaving the Foreign Ministry, Sikorski again visited Kiev, arguing that if Russia moves further into Ukraine, the West should provide Ukraine with defensive weapons.

=== Marshal of the Sejm (2014–2015) ===
On 24 September 2014, Sikorski was elected Marshal of the Sejm. As Marshal, Sikorski introduced a series of reforms: new standards for parliamentary travel, streamlined voting procedures and a new visual standard for parliamentary documents. He also authorized the construction of a new building for Parliamentary Committees.

On 10 June 2015, Sikorski announced his resignation from the post in the wake of an illegal wiretaps scandal. Despite being the victim of illegal action by others, Sikorski explained that he did not want to damage Civic Platform's chances of success in the forthcoming election – "I made this decision for the sake of the Civic Platform, the only party that can maintain Poland's high position in the world".

=== Policy analyst in US (2015–2018) ===
On 6 November 2015, Sikorski was appointed a Senior Fellow at Harvard University's Center for European Studies. He is also a distinguished statesman with the Brzezinski Institute on Geostrategy at the Center for Strategic and International Studies.

On 11 February 2016, Sikorski was elected the chairman of the Board of the Bydgoszcz Industrial-Technological Park. He has donated his salary to Bydgoski Care and Education Institutions Unit.

=== European Parliament (2019–2023) ===
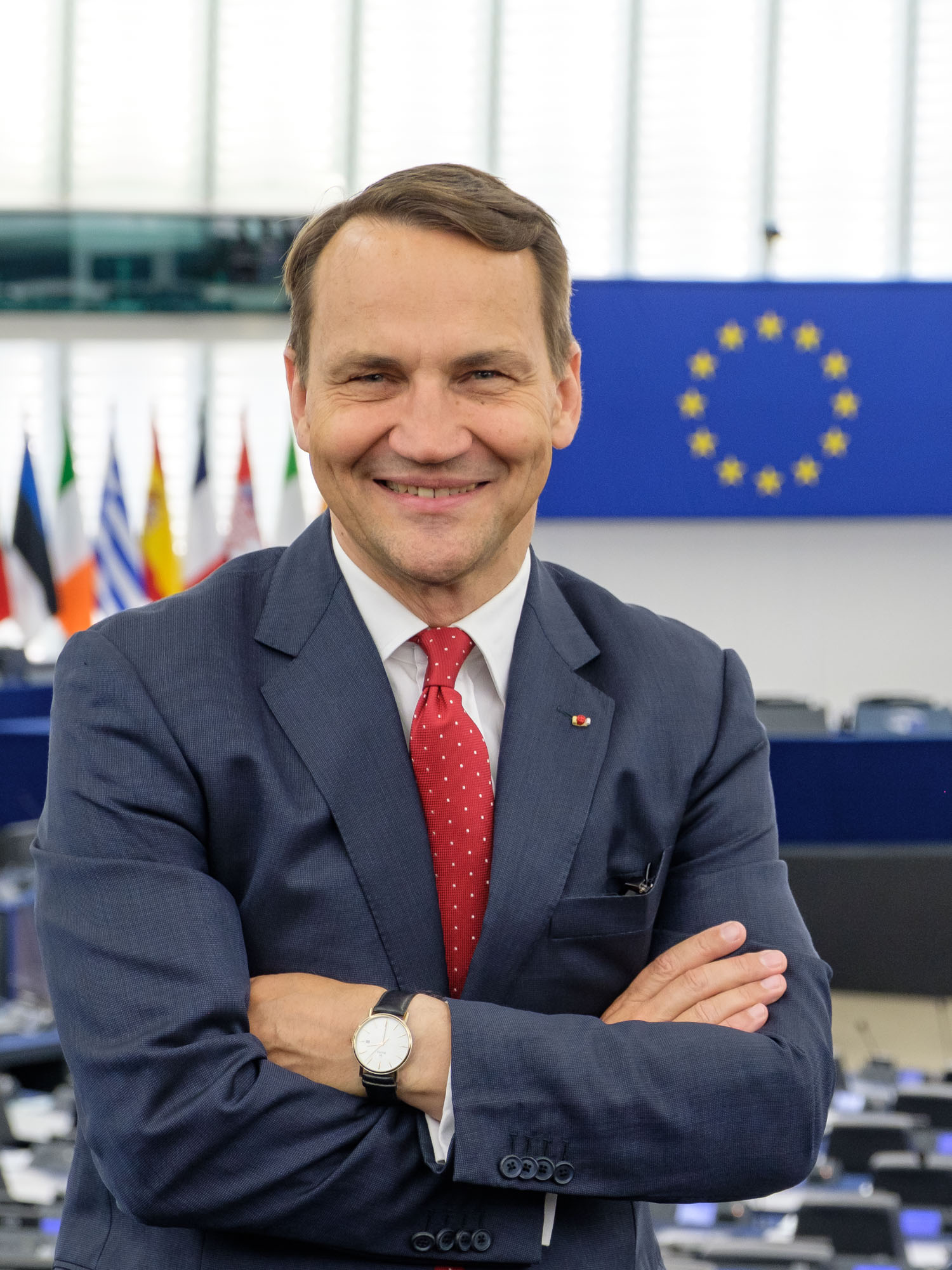
Sikorski at the European Parliament in 2019

In the 2019 European Parliament election Sikorski was elected as the MEP for the Kuyavian-Pomeranian constituency. He was elected as the new chair of the European Parliament's Delegation for relations with the United States of America (D-US). He is one of the people spied on by Polish intelligence services under the PiS government via the Pegasus spyware.

==== 2022 Russian invasion of Ukraine ====
On 15 May 2022, Sikorski took part in a televised debate in Toronto with John Mearsheimer over the Russian invasion of Ukraine. Sikorski identified Vladimir Putin as a culprit in conducting the invasion of Ukraine while Mearsheimer argued the position that Putin is pursuing a realist geopolitical plan to secure Russian national interests in the presence of perceived threats from an expanding NATO.

On 13 June, Sikorski stated that Russia appears to be in violation of the 1994 Budapest Memorandum, in which Ukraine gave up its nuclear weapons which it inherited from the Soviet Union and joined the Treaty on the Nonproliferation of Nuclear Weapons. In a televised interview, Sikorski argued that Russia broke the terms of the deal by invading Ukraine. This prompted the Chairman of the State Duma Vyacheslav Volodin to answer on his Telegram channel that "Sikorski is causing a nuclear conflict in the center of Europe. He does not think about the future of Ukraine or that of Poland. If his suggestions are fulfilled, these countries will cease to exist, as will Europe. Sikorski and the like are the reason why Ukraine must not only be liberated from Nazi ideology, but also demilitarized, ensuring the status of a country free of nuclear weapons."

On 27 September 2022, hours after the 2022 Nord Stream pipeline sabotage, Sikorski posted on Twitter "Thank you, USA" over a picture of the gas leaks that followed the explosions of the gas pipelines Nord Stream 1 and 2. Four hours later, after numerous media outlets had speculated that Sikorski implied the U.S. blew up the pipelines, he made subsequent tweets, where he called the explosions a "special maintenance operation", alluding to the Russian government's euphemism for the invasion of Ukraine. Two days later, on 29 September, he deleted his "Thank you, USA" tweet, keeping only his follow up tweets. By 30 September he had deleted his two subsequent tweets as well.

In January 2023, Sikorski, speaking to Radio ZET, alleged that Morawiecki's Cabinet had considered partitioning Ukraine in early days following Russian invasion, when the risk of fall of Ukraine was high. Propagandist claims of similar extent have previously been made by Kremlin representatives as well as Alexander Lukashenko. Said allegations were denied by the Government, pointing to high levels of military support provided to Ukraine.

==== 2023 Polish parliamentary election ====
During the "June 4th March", which was part of the 2023 Polish protests, Sikorski was seen on the Balcony of a building that houses the Lawyer's office of Roman Giertych, watching the protestors from above.

=== Minister of Foreign Affairs (2023–present) ===
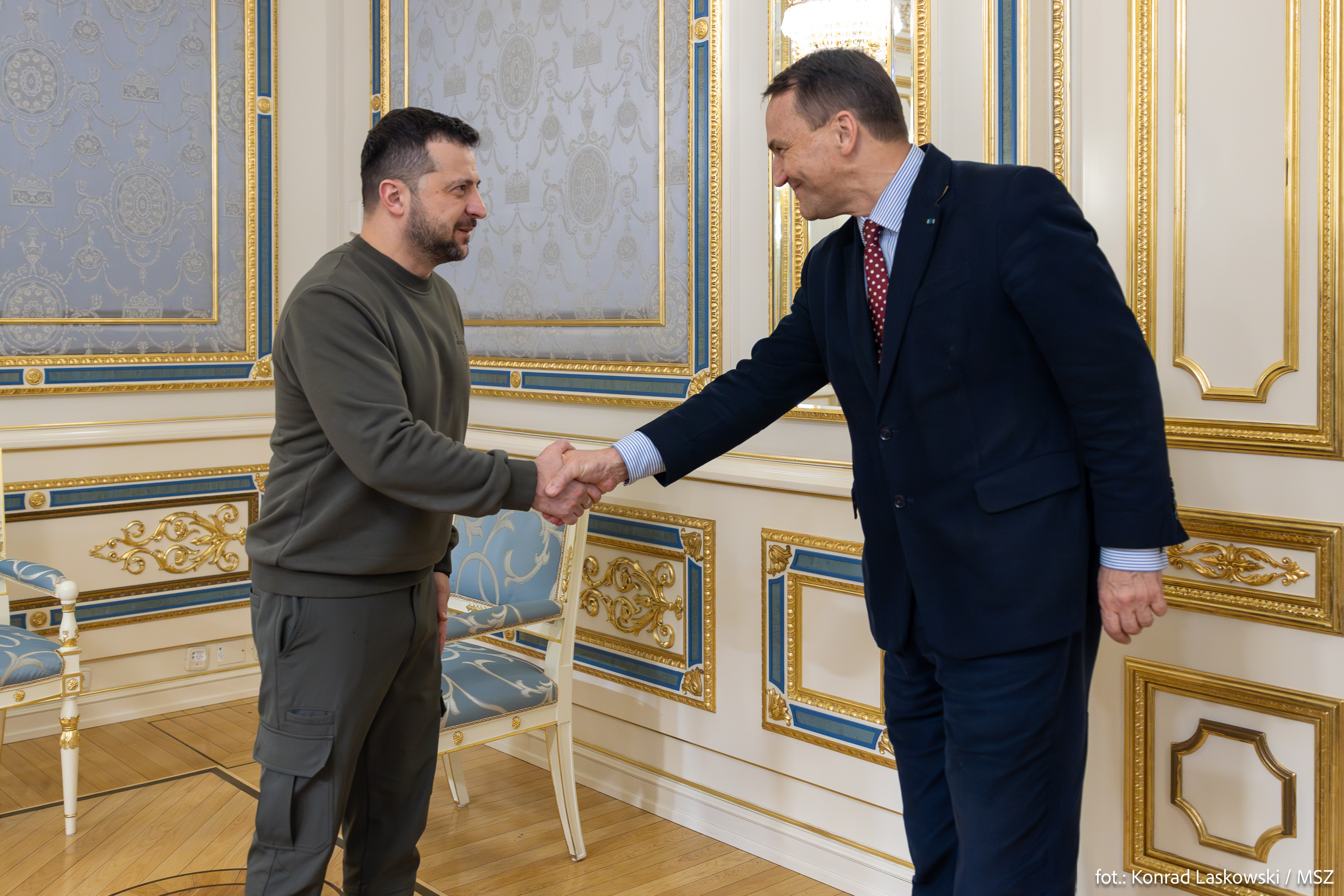
Sikorski with Ukrainian president Volodymyr Zelenskyy in 2023

Sikorski was reappointed as minister of foreign affairs in Donald Tusk's third government on 13 December 2023 following that year's election.

Sikorski made his first visit to Kyiv, Ukraine, where he met with President Volodymyr Zelenskyy, prime minister Denys Shmyhal and the Ukrainian foreign and defence ministers. He also urged that Western countries should rearm and that military production should not be halted as long as the Russian invasion of Ukraine was ongoing. He is of the opinion that greed, not naïveté, drove German energy policy in much of the 21st century.

In January 2024, speaking to Israeli Foreign Minister Israel Katz, he expressed his "unwavering solidarity with Israel" during the Gaza war.

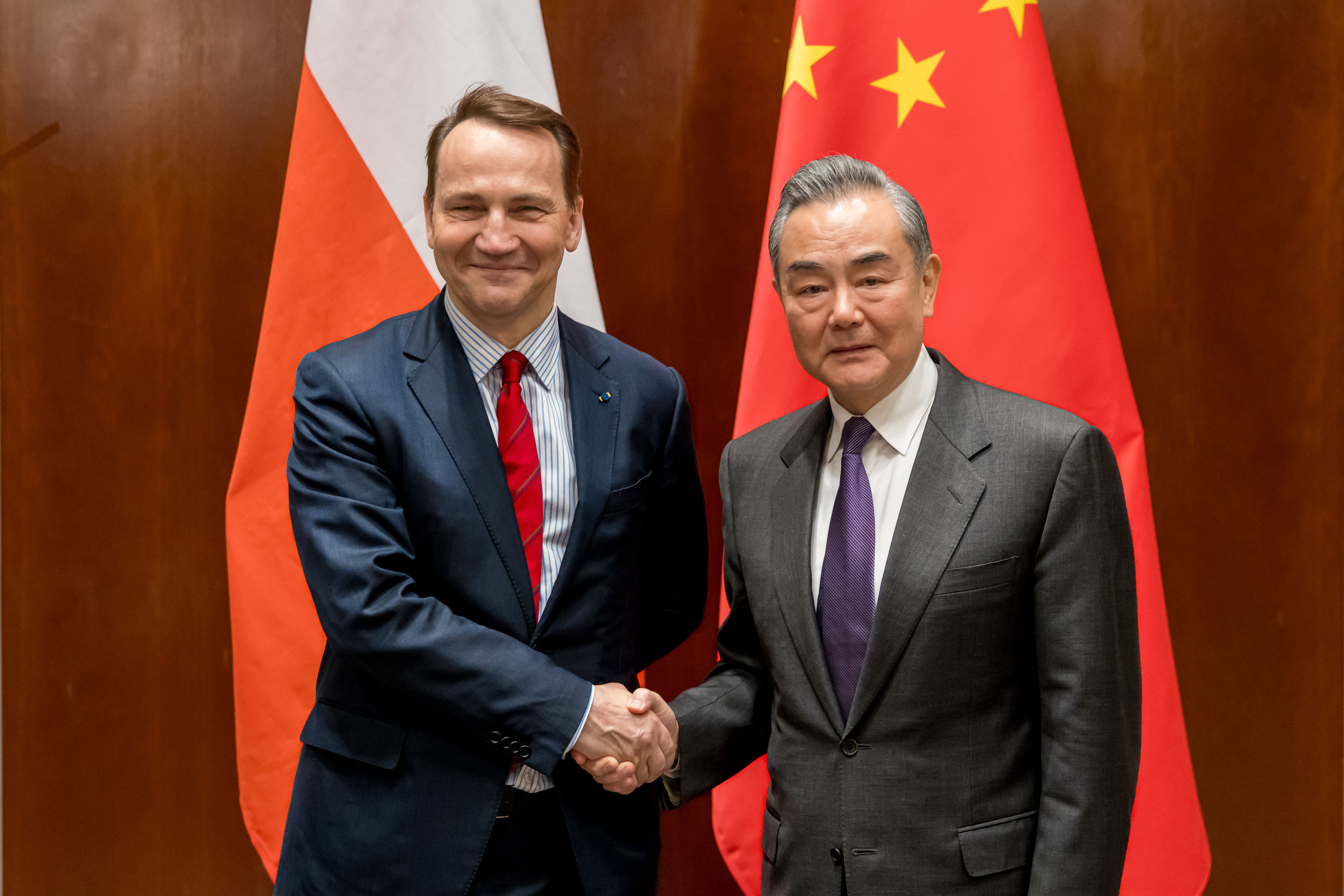
Sikorski with Chinese Foreign Minister Wang Yi at the 60th Munich Security Conference in 2024

On 13 March 2024, Sikorski announced the recall of 50 ambassadors who had been appointed under the previous right-wing government.

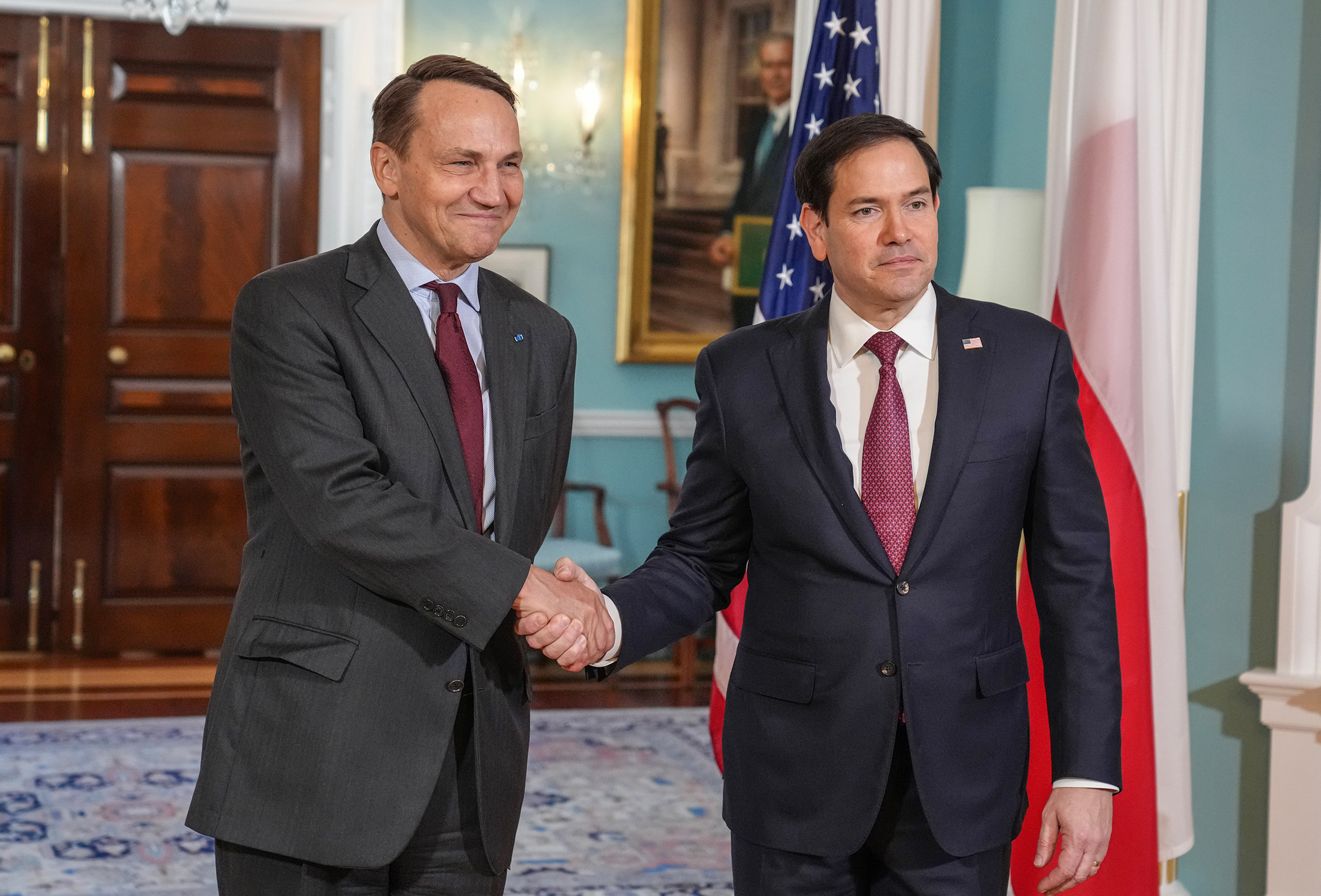
Sikorski and Secretary of State Marco Rubio in 2025

In April 2024, the Polish government offered to repatriate Ukrainian men of military age living in Poland to Ukraine to be drafted into the Ukrainian military. Sikorski later said that this would be an ethically questionable step and Ukraine must take the lead on this issue.

Sikorski said in July 2024 that Poland would spend 5% of its GDP on defense by 2025, which would be the highest in NATO.

In November 2024, Sikorski officially confirmed he would participate in the presidential primary election organized by the Civic Coalition, his main rival being Mayor of Warsaw Rafał Trzaskowski. In the primary held on 22 November, he won 25% of the vote and lost to Trzaskowski.

In May 2024, Sikorski advocated for substantial increases in European defence spending, setting an example by allocating 4% of the nation's GDP to defence. Sikorski also supported several initiatives for enhanced European military cooperation, including the establishment of a 5,000-strong EU mechanised brigade, as well as incorporation of the United Kingdom and Ukraine into existing European defence structures. Sikorski spoke against the earlier "deindustrialisation" of European defense capabilities. He recommended the creation of an "investment bank" so the European Union could confront the Russian threat.

In July 2025, during a reconstruction of the government, he was reappointed as not only the Minister of Foreign Affairs, but also a Deputy Prime Minister.

After Ukrainian president Volodymyr Zelenskyy signed a controversial law that removed independence from two Ukrainian anti-corruption bodies in July 2025, Sikorski warned it could not only derail Ukraine's accession to the EU, but would also 'delight Russian propagandists'.

In August 2025, Sikorski accused Israel of using "excessive force" in the Gaza war. He urged Israel to "respect international humanitarian law" in the Gaza Strip and the occupied West Bank, saying that "no one has the right to cause children to starve". Sikorski also said that Poland recognized the Palestinian state many years ago and has always condemned illegal Israeli settlements in the West Bank.

In a March 2026 interview with Rzeczpospolita, Sikorski stated that he had not witnessed a "direct threat" to Europe, the United States, or Israel from Iran prior to the recent joint U.S.-Israeli strikes.

=== Other activities ===
Other activities include:

- Sir Bani Yas Forum, Member of the advisory board (since 2017)
- Bilderberg Group, Member of the Steering Committee
- Munich Security Conference, Member of the Advisory Council
- Honorary Fellow at the Pembroke College, University of Oxford

== Books published ==
- Moscow's Afghan War: Soviet Motives and Western Interests, 1987
- Dust of the Saints, 1989 (the Polish translation, Prochy Świętych, was first published in 1990)
- The Polish House: An Intimate History of Poland, 1998 (the American edition is titled Full Circle: A Homecoming to Free Poland)
- Strefa Zdekomunizowana [Decommunized Zone], 2007
- Polska może być lepsza [Poland Could Be Better], 2018
- W okopie, w redakcji, w ministerstwie [In Trenches, in Editorial Offices, in Ministries], 2022
- Polska. Stan Państwa [Poland. The State of the State], 2022

== Honors, awards and international recognition ==
Sikorski has received the following honors and awards:

=== Foreign orders and decorations ===
- Grand Cross of the Order of Merit of the Federal Republic of Germany, Germany, 2016
- Member 1st Class of the Order of Merit (No. 407), Ukraine, 2007
- Grand Officer of the Legion of Honour, France, 2012
- Lithuanian Millennium Star, Lithuania, 2008
- Honorary Companion with Breast Star of the National Order of Merit, Malta, 2009
- Commander Grand Cross of the Order of the Polar Star, Sweden, 2011
- Member 3rd class of the Order of Prince Yaroslav the Wise, Ukraine, 2011
- Commander of the Order of Saint-Charles, Monaco, 2012
- Grand Officer of the Order of the Three Stars, Latvia, 2013
- Presidential Order of Excellence, Georgia, 2013
- Vakhtang Gorgasali Order, 1st class, Georgia,
- Grand Officer of the Order of the Crown, Belgium, 2013
- Commander's Cross with Star of the Order of Merit, Hungary, 2014
- Grand Commander of the Order of Honour, Greece, 2014
- Recipient of the Order of Honour, Moldova, 2014
- Member 1st Class of the Order of the Cross of Terra Mariana, Estonia, 2014

=== Awards ===
- Knight of Freedom Award, 2015
- Gold Badge of the Association of Poles in Lithuania, 2010
- Listed among the "Top 100 Global Thinkers 2012" by the magazine Foreign Policy for "speaking the truth, even when it is not diplomatic."
- The Spectator and The Sunday Telegraph 'Young Writers' Award
- Wiktor Award for "Most Popular Politician", 2006
- Laurel of Skills and Competencies 2009 awarded by the Regional Chamber of Commerce in Katowice, 2009
- Freedom Award, the Atlantic Council

=== Honorary doctorates ===
- Honorary Doctorate, Nova University, Lisbon, 2015

== Personal life ==
In the 1980s, Sikorski was in a relationship with Olivia Williams. Since 1992, he has been married to American journalist and historian Anne Applebaum; they have two sons named Aleksander (born 1997) and Tadeusz (born 2000).

== See also ==
- History of Poland (1989–present)
- List of political parties in Poland
- List of politicians in Poland
- Politics of Poland

== Notes ==
Political offices
Preceded by Jerzy Szmajdziński	Minister of National Defence; 2005–2007	Succeeded by Aleksander Szczygło
Preceded by Anna Fotyga	Minister of Foreign Affairs; 2007–2014	Succeeded by Grzegorz Schetyna
Preceded by Ewa Kopacz	Marshal of the Sejm; 2014–2015	Succeeded by Małgorzata Kidawa-Błońska
Preceded by Szymon Szynkowski vel Sęk	Minister of Foreign Affairs; 2023–present	Incumbent
