= Aleksander Szczygło =

Polish politician

Aleksander Marek Szczygło
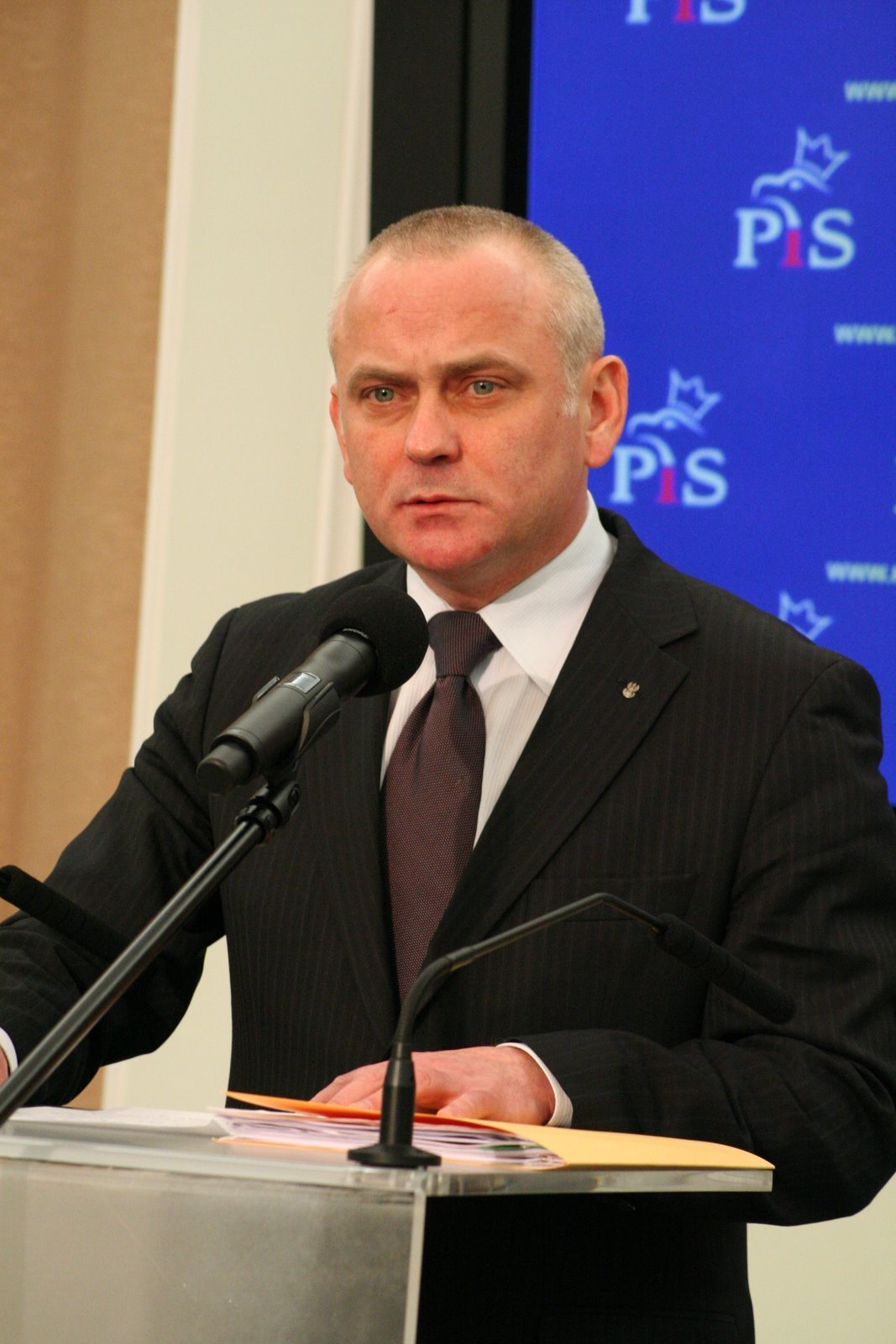

Head of the National Security Bureau
- In office 15 January 2009 – 10 April 2010
- Deputy: Witold Waszczykowski, Zbigniew Nowek
- Preceded by: Władysław Stasiak

Minister of National Defence
- In office 7 February 2007 – 16 November 2007
- Prime Minister: Jarosław Kaczyński
- Preceded by: Radosław Sikorski
- Succeeded by: Bogdan Klich

Chief of Office of the President of the Republic of Poland
- In office 2 August 2006 – 7 February 2007
- Preceded by: Robert Draba
- Succeeded by: Robert Draba

Member of the Sejm
- In office 5 November 2007 – 15 January 2009; 19 October 2001 – 2 August 2006
- Constituency: 35 – Olsztyn

Personal details
- Born: 27 October 1963 Jeziorany, Poland
- Died: 10 April 2010 (aged 46) Smolensk, Russia
- Party: Law and Justice
- Education: University of Gdańsk

Aleksander Marek Szczygło [alɛˈksandɛr ˈʂt͡ʂɨɡwɔ] (27 October 1963 – 10 April 2010) was a Polish politician. He was first elected to the Polish parliament, the Sejm, in 2001 and reelected on 25 September 2005 with 19,006 votes in 35th electoral district (Olsztyn). Both times he was a candidate of the Law and Justice party.

From 7 February 2007 until 16 November 2007 he was Minister of National Defence in the cabinet of Jarosław Kaczyński.

From 15 January 2009 until his death he was the chief of the National Security Bureau.

He was listed on the flight manifest of the Tupolev Tu-154 of the 36th Special Aviation Regiment carrying the President of Poland Lech Kaczyński which crashed near Smolensk-North airport near Pechersk near Smolensk, Russia, on 10 April 2010, killing all aboard.

In 2010, Szczygło was posthumously awarded the Commander's Cross with Star of the Order of Polonia Restituta. He had previously been awarded the Order of Merit of the Republic of Hungary in 2009 and the Ukrainian Order of Merit 2nd Class.

== Scholarly articles and publications ==
Historical propaganda in Russia

== Gallery ==
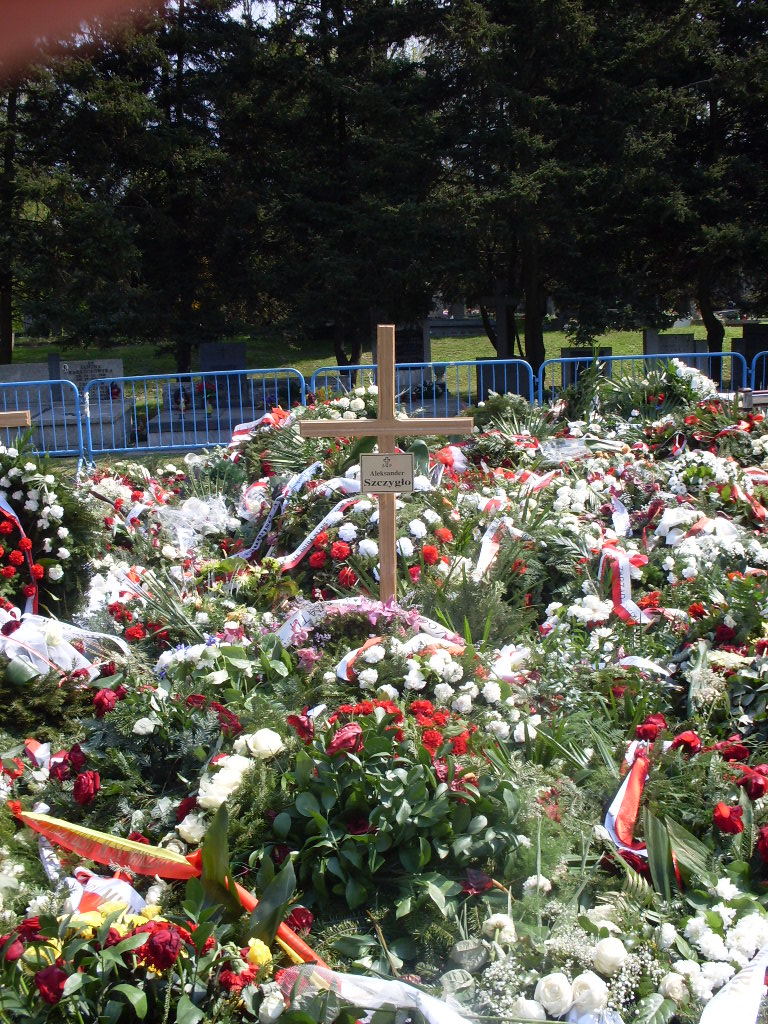
Aleksander Szczygło's tomb in Powązki

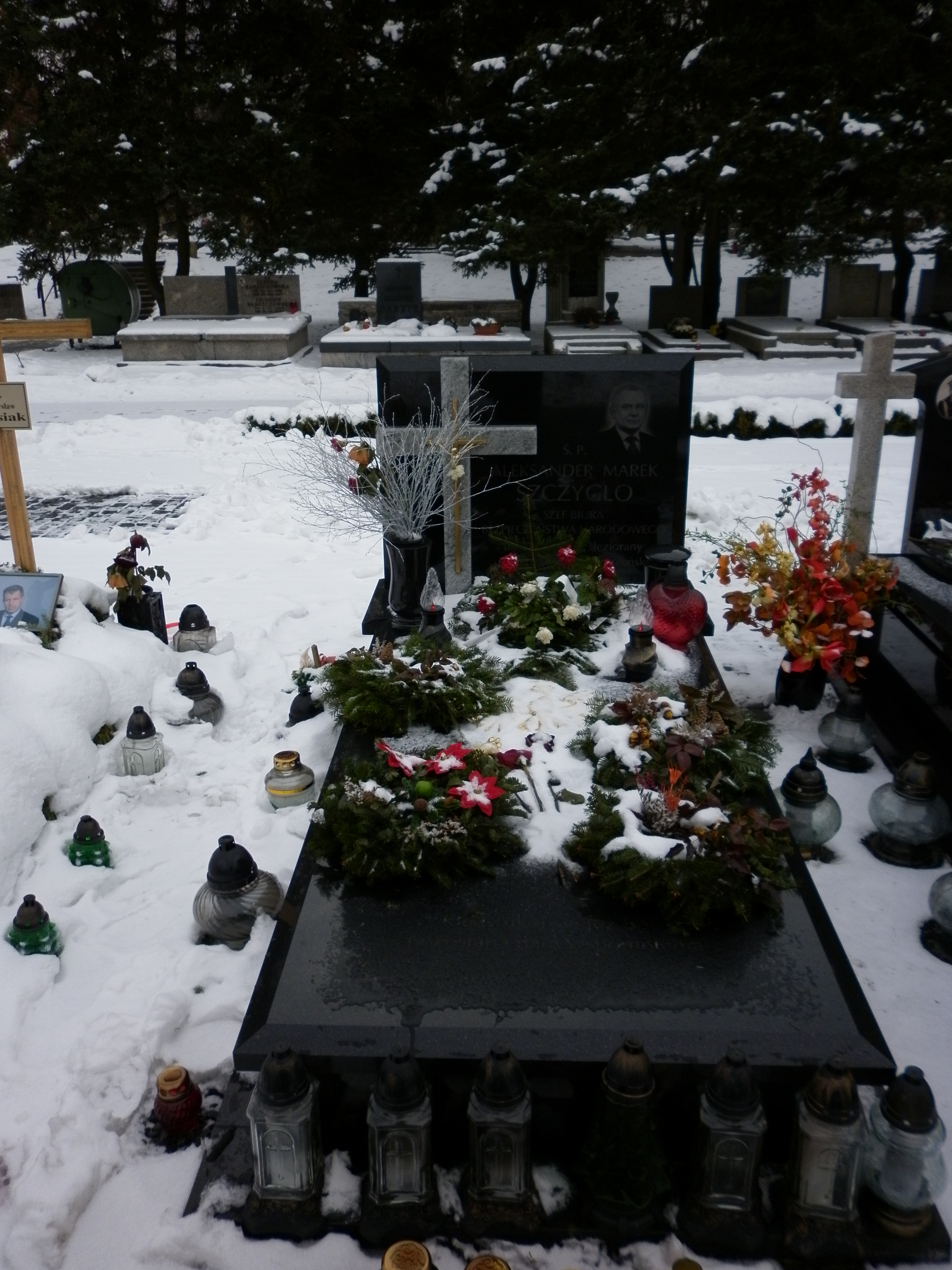
Aleksander Szczygło tomb (2011)

== See also ==
- Members of Polish Sejm 2001-2005
- Members of Polish Sejm 2005–2007
