= Anna Fotyga =

Polish politician (born 1957)

Anna Fotyga MEP
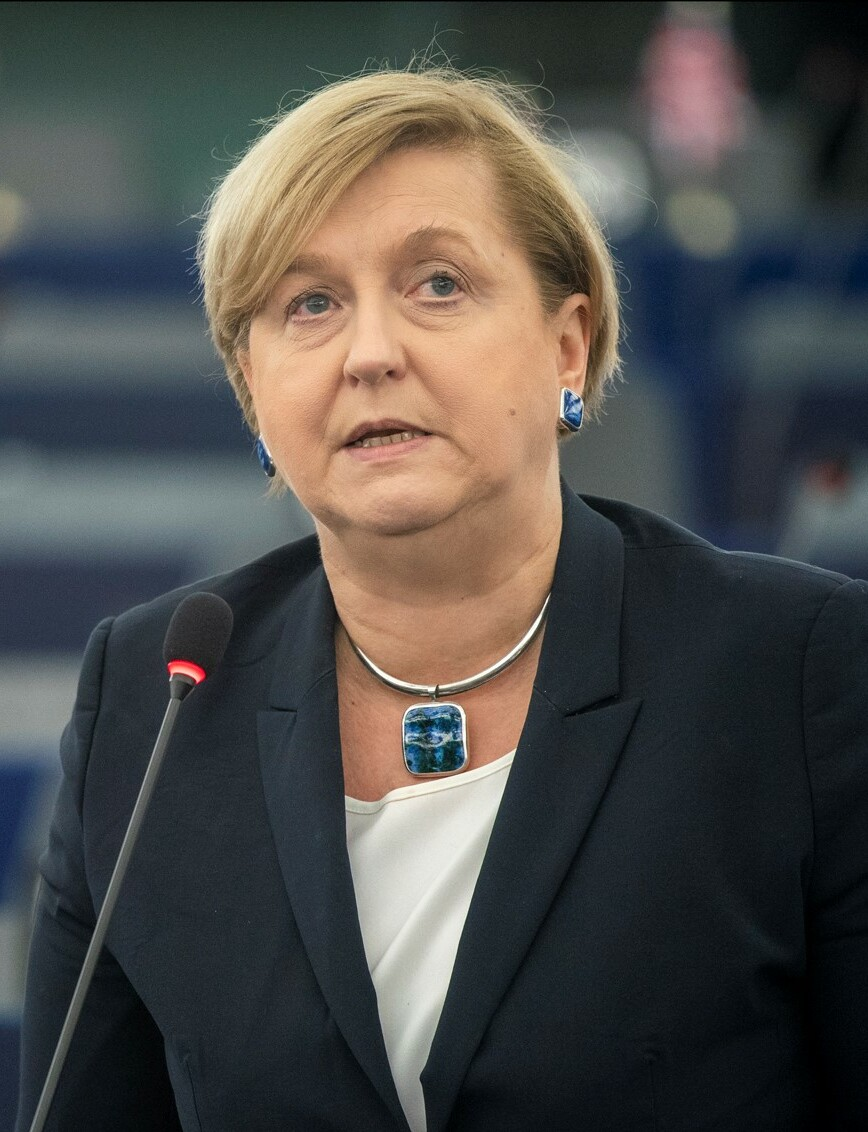

Chair of the European Parliament Security and Defence Subcommittee
- Incumbent
- Assumed office 7 July 2014
- Preceded by: New position

Member of the European Parliament
- Incumbent
- Assumed office 13 June 2004
- Constituency: Poland

Chief of the Chancellery of the President
- In office 29 November 2007 – 20 August 2008
- President: Lech Kaczyński
- Preceded by: Robert Draba (acting)
- Succeeded by: Piotr Kownacki

Minister of Foreign Affairs
- In office 9 May 2006 – 15 November 2007
- Prime Minister: Kazimierz Marcinkiewicz; Jarosław Kaczyński
- Preceded by: Stefan Meller
- Succeeded by: Radosław Sikorski

Personal details
- Born: Anna Elżbieta Fotyga; 12 January 1957 (age 69) Lębork, Poland
- Party: Polish: Law and Justice; EU: ECR
- Spouse: Ryszard Fotyga
- Children: 2
- Education: University of Warsaw; University of Gdańsk

Anna Elżbieta Fotyga (pronounced [ˈanna fɔˈtɨɡa]; née Kawecka; born 12 January 1957) is a Polish politician who currently serves as a Member of the European Parliament, and is the Secretary-General of the European Conservatives and Reformists Party. She has served as Minister of Foreign Affairs of Poland, in the successive cabinets of Kazimierz Marcinkiewicz and Jarosław Kaczyński (2006–2007) and Chief of the Chancellery of the President (2007–2008).

== Early life and education ==
Fotyga is a graduate of the University of Gdańsk and the Danish School of Public Administration. She also served postgraduate internships at the Department of Labor of the United States, Cornell University in New York and the European Bank for Reconstruction and Development.

== Career ==
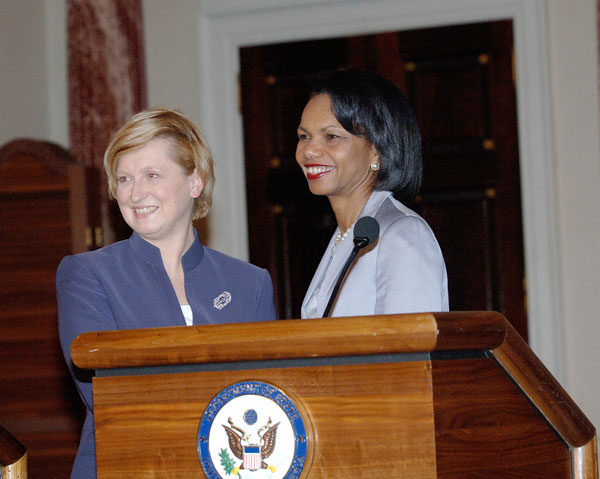
Anna Fotyga with U.S. Secretary of State Condoleezza Rice

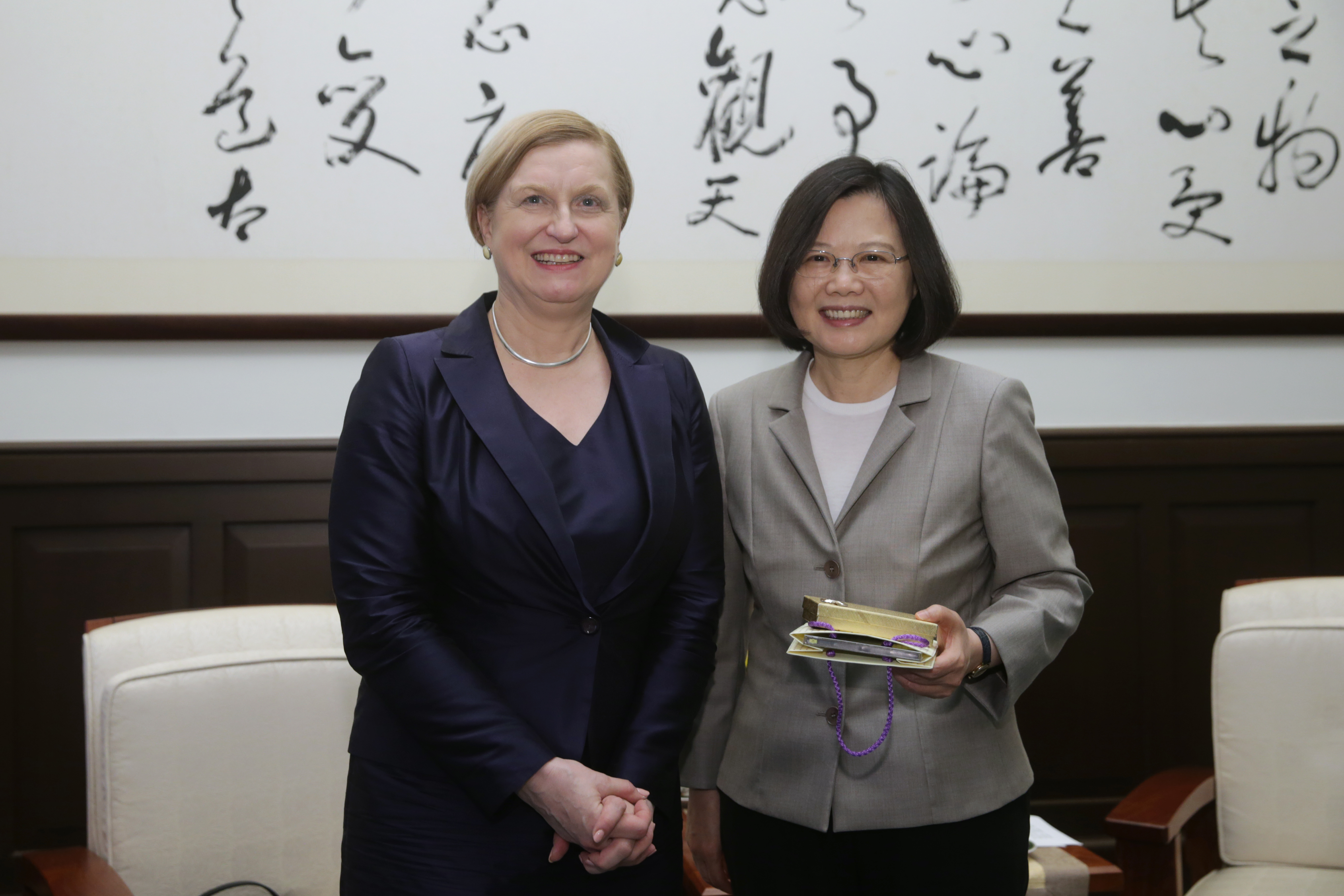
Fotyga with Taiwanese President Tsai Ing-wen in 2017

In 1981, and again after 1989, Fotyga acted as Head of the Foreign Office of the Solidarity headquarters in Gdańsk, and was a close associate of Lech Kaczyński. In 2000, Fotyga served as a foreign affairs adviser under then Prime Minister Jerzy Buzek. Subsequently, she was Deputy Chair of the supervisory board of Social Security Administration (Zakład Ubezpieczen Spolecznych, ZUS) with special expertise in International Labour Organization (Międzynarodowa Organizacja Pracy) and the World Bank. From 2002 to 2004, she was Deputy Mayor of Gdańsk.

=== Career in national politics ===
Fotyga garnered 25,994 votes (the second highest in the region) in the 2004 European parliamentary elections as a candidate of the Law and Justice (PiS) party in the Pomeranian Voivodship.

On 9 May 2006 Fotyga was appointed Minister of Foreign Affairs of the Republic of Poland by President Lech Kaczyński, replacing Stefan Meller. The opposition criticised her office for pursuing a policy of isolation in relation to Russia and Germany. On 7 September 2007, Fotyga was dismissed from her post but re-appointed again on the same day; in this way the prime minister and president avoided her being dismissed by a vote of censure prepared by the Civic Platform three months earlier.

Following the fall of the Kaczynski administration in 2007, she was succeeded by Radosław Sikorski as foreign minister of Poland.

Until 20 August 2008, Fotyga was the chief of the Office of the President of the Republic of Poland.

=== Member of the European Parliament, 2014–present ===
From 2014 until 2019, Fotyga served chair of the European Parliament Subcommittee on Security and Defence. She has since been a full member of both the Committee on Foreign Affairs and its Subcommittee on Security and Defence.

In 2015, news media reported that Fotyga was included in a Russian blacklist of prominent people from the European Union who are not allowed to enter the country.

In 2020, Fotyga was appointed by NATO Secretary General Jens Stoltenberg to join a group of experts to support his work in a reflection process to further strengthen NATO's political dimension.

== Political positions ==
Fotyga's position on foreign affairs is congruent with the policy stance of PiS, based on the concept of Poland as a strong, independent country, poised to confront Germany or Russia when necessary. She has also pursued a policy of close alignment with the U.S.

On 23 November 2016 Fotyga proposed a resolution to counteract propaganda against the EU, which includes advocating censoring Russian media, such as RT and Sputnik. The proposal came under criticism of European Federation of Journalists, and Russian government.

Fotyga has signed a petition supporting the recognition of the Chechen Republic of Ichkeria by the European Parliament.

== Personal life ==
Fotyga is married and has two children.

== See also ==
- 2004 European Parliament election in Poland
