= Robert Draba =

Polish lawyer and politician (born 1970)

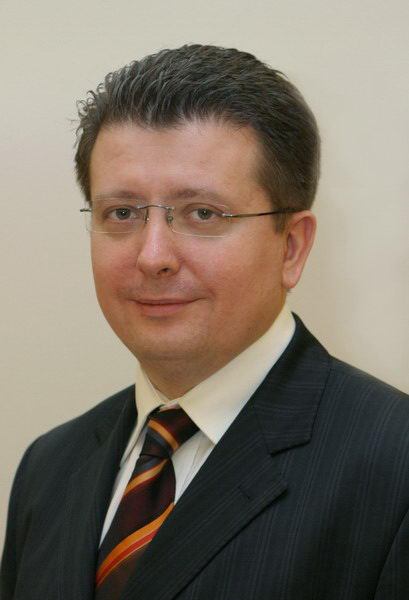

Acting Chief of the Office of the President of the Republic of Poland
- In office June 2, 2006 – August 2, 2006
- President: Lech Kaczyński
- Preceded by: Andrzej Urbański
- Succeeded by: Aleksander Szczygło

Acting Chief of the Office of the President of the Republic of Poland
- In office February 7, 2007 – November 29, 2007
- President: Lech Kaczyński
- Preceded by: Aleksander Szczygło
- Succeeded by: Anna Fotyga

Vice President of Warsaw
- In office January 9, 2004 – December 23, 2005
- President: Lech Kaczyński

Personal details
- Born: April 5, 1970 (age 55) Warsaw, Poland
- Profession: Lawyer

Robert Draba (born April 5, 1970 in Warsaw) is a Polish lawyer and politician.

A graduate of philosophy and sociology, and law schools of University of Warsaw, he worked in Creditanstal Bank before joining public service. He served various positions before entering Presidential office:

- Chief of the legal office in the Fundacja Polsko-Niemieckie pojednanie (1995–1999)
- Deputy of the director of the office of Veteran Affairs (1999–2002)
  - Director of the legal office (2002)
- Legal office director of the city of Warsaw (2002–2004)
- Vice President of Warsaw under President Lech Kaczyński (2004–2005)

After Kaczyński became the President of Poland, he joined his staff as deputy chief of office, responsible for legal matters.

After Andrzej Urbański resigned as a Chief of the Office, he became Acting Chief for the first time. He served from June 2 to August 2, 2006, until Aleksander Szczygło was appointed.

He is now serving this position for the second time, after Szczygło stepped down in order to become Minister of Defense. Draba is acting from February 7, 2007.
