= Piotr Salaber =

Polish musician

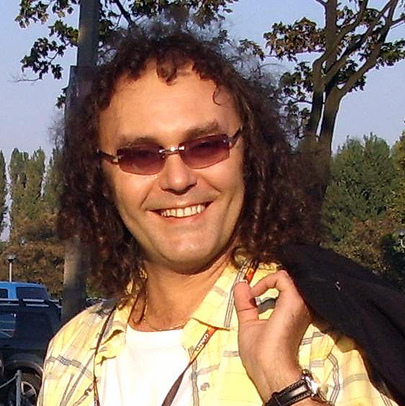
Piotr Salaber

Piotr Salaber (born in 1966 in Wrocław, Poland) – composer, conductor and pianist, „one of the most interesting Polish composers of theatre music” Graduated from the Academy of Music in Bydgoszcz, first - getting his master's degree in choral conducting under prof. H. Gostomski, and later from the Faculty of Composition, and Theory of Music; he earned a doctorate in musical arts in conducting (2005), habilitation in 2012, since 2013 - professor of the Academy of Music in Bydgoszcz On July 27, 2021, he was nominated a professor of art in the discipline of musical arts (full professor).

Awarded with Amadeus - the composer's prize of The Polish Radio Theatre (2017) and The Honorary Pearl of Polish Market in the field of Culture (2017). In 2021 in High School No. C. K. Norwid in Bydgoszcz, a ceremony was held that one of the rooms was named after Piotr Salaber, a graduate in 1984. On November 27, 2021, Piotr Salaber unveiled his autograph at Bydgoszcz Autographs Avenue at ul. Długa.

He polished his composing skills under Karlheinz Stockhausen during master courses in Kuerten, near Cologne (1998–2002), as well as Elżbieta Sikora and Alain Savouret (International Course For Composers, Gdańsk 2000) Since the academic year 2006/2007 he has been giving lectures on film music at the Institute of Audiovisual Arts at the Jagiellonian University in Kraków, and since 2010 also at the Academy of Music in Bydgoszcz, in 2016 as a guest lecturer at the University of British Columbia in Vancouver. So far he composed the music for over a hundred and twenty theater premieres, three feature movies, and TV series. Constantly works with Polish Radio and Television, also with theaters in Poland (Atheneum, 6th Floor Theatre, Warsaw), France (Atelier - Theatre, Paris), Canada (Popular Theatre, Vancouver), Hungary (Csokonai Theater, Debrecen), Nemzeti Színház {National Theatre}, Budapest), Puppet and It are Double Theater (Taiwan). and Russia (Bolshoi Drama Theater, Moscow Sovremennik Theatre) St. Petersburg)

"The work of Piotr Salaber focuses on two types of music: theater music (over a hundred and twenty theater productions) and songs for children (more than 100 songs, the musical). Other compositions (about 10), for choir, soloists, electronic media, and orchestra. The characteristic of the work of Salaber is combining sounds of traditional instruments (including folk instruments from different regions of the world) with electronic sounds. Of great importance for the composer is also the problem of surround sound and taking into account the principles of perception in creating and shaping the tension in the composition. "
