= List of international prime ministerial trips made by Jarosław Kaczyński =

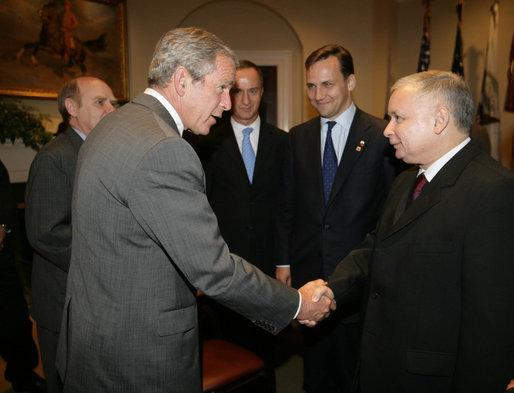
Premier Kaczyński with George W. Bush during his visit to the United States in 2006.

Below is a list of international trips made by Jarosław Kaczyński, the 13th Prime Minister of Poland. The number of visits per country where he travelled are:

- One visit to Portugal, Denmark, Netherlands, Ukraine, Germany, Italy, Vatican City, United States
- Two visits to Belgium, Lithuania, Iraq, Slovakia, Finland

== 2006 ==
Country	Location	Date	Details
Belgium	Brussels	30 June	
Belgium	Brussels	30 August	
Finland	Helsinki	10 September	
United States	Washington D.C.	13-15 September	
Hungary	Budapest	10 October	
Italy	Rome	12 October	
Vatican	Vatican City	12 October	
Germany	Berlin	30 October	
Ukraine	Kyiv	15 November	
Lithuania	Vilnius	8 December	
Lithuania	Vilnius	15 December	
Iraq	Baghdad	20 December	

== 2007 ==
Country	Location	Date	Details
Netherlands	The Hague	15 March	
Denmark	Copenhagen	16 March	
Belgium	Brussels	18 April	
Portugal	Lisbon	20 April	
Slovakia	Bratislava	11 May	
Iraq	Baghdad	16 May	
Slovakia	Bratislava	18 June	
Finland	Helsinki	12 September	
