= Democratic Left Association =

Democratic Left Association Stowarzyszenie Lewicy Demokratycznej
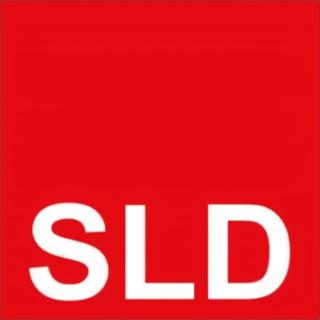
- Abbreviation: SLD
- Chairman: Jerzy Teichert
- Vice-Chairman: Robert Kwiatkowski
- Founded: 7 March 2022
- Split from: New Left; Polish Socialist Party
- Headquarters: Al. Niepodległości 22, 65-048 Zielona Góra
- Membership (2023): 2,000
- Ideology: Social democracy; Pro-Europeanism; Left-wing patriotism; Old left; Minority: Social conservatism Democratic socialism
- Political position: Centre-left to left-wing
- National affiliation: Civic Coalition (2023)
- Affiliated parties: New Wave
- Colors: Red; Sanguine (2022-2023)
- Sejm: 0 / 460
- Senate: 0 / 100
- European Parliament: 0 / 52
- Regional assemblies: 0 / 552

Website
- Facebook page Parliamentary circle's Facebook page Twitter page
- Politics of Poland; Political parties; Elections; Party's logo used between 2022 and 2023. Also the logo of the parliamentary group.

The Democratic Left Association (Polish: Stowarzyszenie Lewicy Demokratycznej, SLD) is a Polish political association created by the former New Left members who left the coalition and parliamentary group of The Left after a conflict with the coalition's leadership. The association was formed with the intention to continue the legacy of the Democratic Left Alliance, while maintaining close ties with New Left's ideological rivals — the Labour Union. Jerzy Teichert, a former local activist and a former member of SLD was selected as the president of the association, while Robert Kwiatkowski, an MP elected on the list of The Left, became the vice-president. The party seeks to represent an alternative to "the western left" and the "rainbow flag", and dismisses other left-wing parties for committing to social progressivism on issues like LGBT and abortion, as well as immigration.

The party started as the Parliamentary Group of the Democratic Left (Polish: Koło Parlamentarne Lewicy Demokratycznej) formed by Robert Kwiatkowski, Andrzej Rozenek, its chairwoman Joanna Senyszyn, and the deputy speaker of the Senate Gabriela Morawska-Stanecka, who, after leaving New Left, formed the Polish Socialist Party (PPS) parliamentary group from 14 December 2021 to 6 February 2023 (together with the party's chairman, senator Wojciech Konieczny), and in 2022 they established the Democratic Left Association, following in the tradition of the Democratic Left Alliance (which ceased to exist as a party in 2021, merging with Wiosna to form Nowa Lewica). When the Polish Socialist Party chapter was founded in 2021, Andrzej Rozenek and Senyszyn became members of the party. They left PPS in August 2023. In December 2025, Senyszyn created New Wave.

== History ==
=== Origins ===
The party dates back to the conflict within the Democratic Left Alliance in 2021. The party's leader, Włodzimierz Czarzasty, was increasingly opposed by the regional branches of the party for his cooperation with Law and Justice as well as his talks with the social liberal party Wiosna for a merger. Most members of the Democratic Left Alliance opposed this decision, and when Czarzasty called for a party convention to announce the merger, the regional branches voted the convention down. Ultimately, the merger still took place despite the opposition. Democratic Left Alliance dissolved itself in 2021 to become the New Left together with Wiosna.

The MPs that came to create the Democratic Left Association were known as the 'reformist' faction within the SLD. They opposed Czarzasty's leadership and his decision to merge Wiosna, which Czarzasty had been pursuing since 2019. Between July and September 2021, Czarzasty sought to suppress this faction, given that it was blocking the merger with Wiosna. The reformist faction was also supported by influential figures within the SLD, such as former prime minister Leszek Miller and former president Aleksander Kwaśniewski, who both criticized Czarzasty's leadership. Consequently, Czarzasty suspended Tomasz Trela, Andrzej Rozenek, Bogusław Wontor and Joanna Senyszyn from the party. Czarzasty also had an open rivalry with Krzysztof Podgórski and Robert Kwiatkowski (who became the leader of Democratic Left Association).

According to Przegląd, Czarzasty had to force the merger despite the opposition within the party, writing: "SLD activists who did not agree to the merger of the SLD with Wiosna were "suspended, thrown out or were not allowed into the new party's headquarters". The Warsaw Council of the SLD, which was against it, was simply dissolved. As a result, several hundred SLD activists from Warsaw alone surrendered their party cards." In December 2021, the MPs of the Democratic Left Alliance who protested the decision entered the Polish Socialist Party and formed their own parliamentary group that came to be the Democratic Left Association. While formally representing the Polish Socialist Party, the parliamentary group was increasingly autonomous.

=== Foundation ===
The Democratic Left Association was registered on 7 March 2022. Jerzy Teichert became its chairman and MP Robert Kwiatkowski its secretary general. The party was founded by the MPs who were forming the parliamentary circle of the Polish Socialist Party since December 2021. Its co-founder was Joanna Senyszyn, the vice-chair of the Polish Socialist Party's Supreme Council. Its activities were inaugurated on 2 June 2022. It presented itself as a "democratic association for truly leftist ideals" and denounced the leader of Democratic Left Alliance (SLD) Włodzimierz Czarzasty for his decision to dissolve the party and merge with Wiosna to form the New Left. The Democratic Left Association noted that the SLD had 24,000 members and had existed for 20 years, whereas Wiosna was a recent party that had about 500 members, and yet it nevertheless forced SLD to compromise its ideals. It accused Czarzasty of "lack of democracy, tyranny, unfair division of power" within the SLD.

=== Coalition with PPS ===
After 23 days, the party signed, similarly to the PPS, a cooperation agreement ahead of the upcoming parliamentary elections together with Labour Union, Social Democracy of Poland, Freedom and Equality, as well as, among others, the association Working People's Movement and the activists of the former party Feminist Initiative, advocating for a ‘broad electoral agreement of the democratic opposition’. The Democratic Left Association includes, among others, former MP Zbyszek Zaborowski. and a councillor of the Lower Silesian Regional Assembly, former senator Mirosław Lubiński.

At the time, the Democratic Left Association also considered a merger with Labour Union in order to revive the historical Democratic Left Alliance – Labour Union coalition. The party was later joined by the MEP and former Prime Minister Leszek Miller and Bogusław Wontor. In November 2022, Democratic Left Association organized a 20th anniversary of the Democratic Left Alliance – Labour Union together with the leading Labour Union and Democratic Left Alliance politicians of the 2000s, such as Marek Pol, Waldemar Witkowski and Leszek Miller. Here the party was also described by the media as a danger to the New Left from the [further] left.

=== Break with PPS ===
The association has set itself the goal of creating an alternative to New Left. By July 2022, Democratic Left Association was in an electoral coalition together with the Polish Socialist Party and Labour Union. The parties were planning to run together under the banner of the Polish Socialist Party. The SLD-PPS-UP coalition polled 2.5% in September 2022. On 5 February 2023, the executive council of the Polish Socialist Party withdrew from the agreement and instead passed a resolution on the party's intention to run together in the 2023 Polish parliamentary election with New Left as well as Left Together and Labour (in August, Social Democracy of Poland also joined the agreement), and withdrew its consent for the Democratic Left Association parliamentary group to use the PPS name and symbol.

The Polish Socialist Party explained that its decision was motivated by the Democratic Left Association, formally representing the parliamentary group of the PPS, was too autonomous and already acted as a de facto separate party; it also added that this decision was taken in order to enter the electoral lists of New Left. On the same day, the MPs of the circle – with the exception of Wojciech Konieczny, who became an independent senator – therefore transformed the PPS parliamentary group into the Parliamentary Group of the Democratic Left. In March 2023, the new party was banned from using the logo of the old SLD, and Joanna Senyszyn, the party's co-founder, was removed from the Supreme council of the PPS. In August 2023, members of the Democratic Left Association formally resigned their membership in the PPS, and formally renamed their parliamentary circle to Parliamentary Group of the Democratic Left.

=== 2023 election ===
In mid-August 2023, Senator Gabriela Morawska-Stanecka left the club and joined the parliamentary club of the Civic Coalition. The party then abandoned its intention to create a broad left-wing coalition for the election, and instead wanted to unite left-wing parties to negotiate their way into the electoral lists of the Civic Coalition. This decision was harshly criticized by other left-wing movements, including New Left, whose MEP Krzysztof Śmiszek stated that the Democratic Left Association has become "social centre-right instead of social democracy". In response, the party wrote that the left should no longer consider centre-right Civic Platform its enemy, and called out the New Left's eventual cooperation with it.

In the 2023 Polish parliamentary election, only Andrzej Rozenek (from the Civic Coalition list) ran among the members of the party, but did not win a seat in parliament. Joanna Senyszyn registered her own committee for the Senate election, arguing that the Senate Pact 2023 did not allow the Democratic Left Association to democratically negotiate placing its candidates on the united opposition lists. However, the electoral commission rejected the registration of her candidacy. In September 2023, Senyszyn was sued for calling the cursed soldiers "not soldiers, but gangs of social outcasts, idlers and frustrated individuals waiting for World War III." Zbyszek Zaborowski ran unsuccessfully for the Sejm from the KO list on behalf of the Democratic Left Association, as did Andrzej Rozenek, while Gabriela Morawska-Stanecka was re-elected to the Senate on behalf of the Civic Coalition. The party actively campaigned for its candidates on the KO lists, promoting policies such as grain embargo on Ukraine, embargo on imported coal, recognition of the Silesian language, restricting logging of Polish forests, restricted immigration, and modification of the Family 500+ program to provide more for the poorest and less for the wealthier families.

=== 2024 and 2025 elections ===
On 12 February 2024, the Court of Appeal in Warsaw dismissed the New Left's complaint regarding Democratic Left Association using the logo of the Democratic Left Alliance. In light of the court's decision, the National Electoral Commission accepted the party's logo on 15 February. The party started using the logo of the Democratic Left Alliance the same month.

The party stated its intention to run in the 2024 Polish local elections independently. The party fielded its own list to the voivodeship sejmiks. It ran under the name of "SLD", and used the logo of the Democratic Left Alliance. It won 13,169 votes (0.09% of the popular vote) and no seats. New Left, which lost roughly 25% of its seats and popular vote compared to the SLD's performance in the 2018 Polish local elections, blamed Democratic Left Association for splitting the left-wing electorate.

In January 2025, the chairwoman of the Democratic Left Association, Joanna Senyszyn, declared her candidacy for the 2025 Polish presidential election. She became the official candidate of the party in the election, and on 27 March she gathered enough signatures to appear on the ballot box. On 11 April 2025, Senyszyn participated in a presidential debate in Końskie, where she wore the badge of the Democratic Left Association. Senyszyn declared herself to be the official candidate of the Democratic Left Association, calling it "the true left". She stated that the help of the Democratic Left Association allowed her to gather enough signatures to qualify for the election.

In the first round of the presidential election, Senyszyn won 1.09% of the popular amount, amounting to over 200,000 votes. After the first round, the Democratic Left Association endorsed Rafał Trzaskowski, the candidate of the Civic Platform, for the second round. On 25 May, Senyszyn participated in a march in Warsaw in support of Trzaskowski, where she gave his wife, Małgorzata Trzaskowska, her iconic red corals, asking her to take them to the presidential palace and offering Trzaskowski her endorsement.

After the election, on 3 June, Senyszyn announced the creation of a new socio-political association, "Senyszyn's Red Corals" (Polish: Czerwone Korale Senyszyn). The association is to be democratic and be based on her young followers that she gained in her presidential run. She criticized both Magdalena Biejat of The Left and Adrian Zandberg of Razem parties, calling them "a certain left-wing faction whose slogan is: “PiS, PO – pure evil”". Senyszyn stressed that she wants to create a left which would not believe "that such an equation should be made".

In September 2025, Senyszyn founded her new party, which came to be named New Wave rather than Red Corals. It was registered on 8 December 2025; similarly to the Democratic Left Association, New Wave criticized the New Left as "ideologically spineless" and Senyszyn denounced its leader Włodzimierz Czarzasty as an "authoritarian sexist", but unlike the Democratic Left Association, New Wave is to focus on anti-clericalism, feminism, as well as LGBT and animal rights. Despite the creation of New Wave, Democratic Left Association continues to exist as a political association.

== Election results ==
=== Presidential ===
Election year	Candidate	1st round		2nd round	
Election year	Candidate	Votes	%	Votes	%
2025	Joanna Senyszyn	214,198	1.09 (#9)	Endorsed Rafał Trzaskowski	

=== Sejm ===
Election year	# of votes	% of vote	# of overall seats won	+/–
2023	8,579	0.01	0 / 460	▼4
2023	On behalf of the Civic Coalition, which won 157 seats.			

=== Regional assemblies ===
Election year	# of votes	% of vote	# of overall seats won	+/–
2024	13,169	0.09	0 / 552	New

== Ideology ==
The party is social democratic. It focuses on continuing the legacy of the Democratic Left Alliance, using its abbreviation and former party logo. It maintains SLD's policies, but it tries to get votes in areas that are considered right-leaning. It leans towards social conservatism, and argues that the Polish left must distance itself from issues like LGBT and abortion. In regards to feminism and LGBT issues, the party declares that it would "not put such slogans on its banners", arguing that these matters should be dismissed in favor of socioeconomic focus on funding public services and reducing unemployment. The party dismissed the socially liberal left as "pink-haired chicks", writing: "You can have fun with pink-haired chicks, but not do politics. Like with hippies..."

It describes itself as a front for centre-left and left-wing political views, and names "democracy, pro-Europeanism, the rule of law and social justice" as its basic values. In its first convention, the SLD declared that its objectives would be "expanding educational activities, undertaking initiatives to counteract unemployment, protecting the environment and promoting European integration." It also describes itself as patriotic, stating that it fights for "democracy, freedom, self-government and patriotism." The party also describes itself as a "democratic left open to dialogue with the extra-parliamentary left". It strongly criticizes its rival party New Left, but also agrees with it in some areas like the Polish Constitution, the European Union, and the rule of law.

=== Social issues ===
The Democratic Left Association is highly critical of promotion of sociocultural issues by other left-wing parties, dismissing social liberalism as "culture war at its worst". The party declares that it would not put slogans of abortion access and LGBT rights on its banners, and questions the seriousness of parties that priotitize such issues, dismissing them as 'pink-haired chicks". The party believes that other left-wing movements in Poland, especially the New Left, have abandoned social democracy in the name of 'rainbow' liberalism. It also argues that Polish left has a culture of sexism and authoritarianism in its way of organization. In its criticism of other left-leaning parties, Democratic Left Association criticizes the adoption of liberal positions on sociocultural and moral issues, and argues for the need to push back against the socially liberal and urbanite ("Varsovian") left and its domination in Poland. It argues that the Polish left must choose "the red banner, the social democratic one" instead of the "rainbow flag of the Western left".

The Democratic Left Association has a positive assessment of the Polish People's Republic and references communist nostalgia; it also condemns Polish liberal and left-leaning parties for their anti-communism. The party is particularly positive towards the 1970s communist Poland under Edward Gierek; party leader in the Silesian region, Zbyszek Zaborowski, argued that despite "the leading role of the PZPR and eternal friendship with the Soviet Union", communist Poland "moved the country forward in terms of civilization", and credited Gierek with pragmatic relations with the West, modernizing Polish industry, improving the supply of consumer goods to the domestic markets, developing Polish agriculture, and bringing about "equal rights for rural areas in terms of social security". The party is skeptical towards immigration, arguing that "the Polish authorities must first and foremost help the citizens of the Polish state". It supports legal recognition of the Silesian minority and the Silesian language as a regional language in Poland. It is sympathetic towards the Silesian Autonomy Movement, and described its leader Jerzy Gorzelik as a "staid regional politician". The party's proposals also include expanding the Silesian Opole Voivodeship, and reorganizing Polish voivodeships to reduce the domination of urban centres.

The party promotes left-wing patriotism, and together with the Polish Socialist Party it adopted a slogan "Poland's independence was won by the democratic left". The parties claimed that Józef Piłsudski, Ignacy Daszyński, Jędrzej Moraczewski and Gabriel Narutowicz were the "leaders of the democratic left" and named them the patrons of the political left-wing traditions. The Democratic Left Association stated that right-wing nationalist movements are wrongly trying to appropriate these figures and their tradition of Polish patriotism. The party aspires to unite various left-wing tendencies, including "the anti-communist left, which recalls the traditions of Józef Piłsudski and Bolesław Limanowski, and the nostalgic supporters of the democratically renewed and pro-European post-communists."

=== Economy ===
In regards to the economy, the main proposal of the party includes expanding the welfare state to include special, additional pensions for uniformed and public workers. It criticized the construction of Camerimage building in Toruń instead of allocating funds into reducing the costs of energy to citizens. The party also supports the Family 500+ program, but argues that the pension should not be distributed equally, and the program should instead give more money to the poorest families and less to the more well-off ones. In a joint program signed together with Labour Union, Democratic Left Association also stated its commitment to establishing a 7-hour workday, and advocates solving the housing crisis by establishing state-managed housing cooperatives that would own apartments instead of private companies, and handle mortgages of its flats instead of making it the responsibility of individual tenants. In regards to environmental issues, the party's main proposal is restricting logging of Polish forests.

The co-founder of the Democratic Left Association, Joanna Senyszyn, supports free universal healthcare and free high education, while opposing cutting taxes, expressing concern about the pursuit of lower taxes entailing cuts on public services and benefits. She opposes allocating 5% of Polish GDP on the military, arguing that 3.5% is more than sufficient. She criticized increases in military spending and postulated spending more on Polish education and healthcare instead, including lowering health insurance costs for people who have been fully vaccinated and allocating 30 billion PLN from the state budget to the National Health Fund. She was skeptical towards the ad valorem tax (Polish: podatek katastralny), arguing that it risks taxing people with lower incomes, especially seniors and residents of large cities. She stated that such tax could only be considered in a progressive form, with high allowances for the less well-off.

=== Foreign policy ===
While declaring pro-Europeanism, the party stated that it will pursue good relations with all of Poland's neighbours, including eastern ones such as Russia. It called the Russo-Ukrainian War "completely unnecessary", and argued that while Poland carries some responsibility for the war because it contributed to tensions between Russia and Ukraine. It also opposes Ukraine entering NATO. The party supported the decision of Law and Justice to implement an embargo on Ukrainian grain in September 2023, arguing that Polish farmers should be supported from foreign markets, and that Ukrainian agriculture is dominated by large industrial enterprises, which makes free trade with Ukraine serve "mainly the interests of large behemoths". It also supports an embargo on imported coal in order to develop the coal mining industry of Silesia; the party stated: "We import coal from all over the world of different quality, disregarding our jobs and our own energy security."

=== View of other parties ===
The Democratic Left Association is highly critical of the New Left, describing it as a party that stands for the Western left and the 'rainbow flag', as opposed to "the red banner, the social democratic one" that the Democratic Left Association aspires to represent; it also accepts the Polish People's Republic and its legacy as an integral part of the Polish left, and criticizes the New Left for rejecting it. It is considered to be 'outflanking' New Left from further left. The party focuses on economic postulates, and believes that the reason for the decline of the Polish left is prioritizing cultural issues over socioeconomic ones. The Democratic Left Association also praises Law and Justice, describing it as "very democratic in comparison to New Left".

However, despite initially striking a positive tone towards Law and Justice, the party later argued that "the most important thing is to remove PiS from power". The party states that it "believes in the project of social democracy in Poland", but that "it will not be created under the rule of Czarzasty and Biedroń." It stated its intention to work together with the Polish Socialist Party, Labour Union, Social Democracy of Poland, Feminist Initiative as well as trade unionists and also The Greens, arguing that The Greens are "drowned in the Civic Platform". Ultimately, the Democratic Left Association moderated itself and decided to run on the electoral lists of the neoliberal Civic Coalition, claiming that "whatever bad things we attribute to PO, it is the only party that has a chance to really fight PiS". Other left-wing parties criticized the Democratic Left Association for entering a coalition with the neoliberal Civic Platform, with Krzysztof Śmiszek writing: "They build a lifeboat in the form of the SLD to knock on Tusk's door and became social-centre-right instead of social democracy."

The party calls for a "mass uprising from the left side of the political scene to unite the forces of the democratic opposition" and a unity of "the parliamentary forces and the extra-parliamentary left". Its vice-chairman, Robert Kwiatkowski called an agreement of Christian democracy and left-wing forces his dream, arguing that "in fundamental matters there is not much that differs us... We have an equally strong attachment to matters related to the rule of law, to our place in the EU, to the defense policy that Poland should pursue, to economic policy..." Kwiatkowski also added that it is necessary to form coalitions with "liberals, conservatives, and members of the Polish People's Party. Because, figuratively speaking, you first have to beat D'Hondt in order to defeat PiS". The Democratic Left Association started as a parliamentary group of the Polish Socialist Party. However, some of the party members were criticized for lacking a strong attachment to socialism and seeking coalitions with liberal parties.

== See also ==
- Democratic Left Alliance
- Self-Defence of the Republic of Poland
- Labour Union
- Working People's Movement
- Democratic Party of the Left
- Reason Party
- Polish Labour Party - August 80
- Europa Plus
