= Proposed French Sixth Republic =

Proposed successor state to the current France Fifth Republic

The Sixth Republic (French: Sixième République) is a potential successor to the present republican system in France, proposed as a solution to alleged issues of the current Fifth French Republic.

Following 82.6% of voters supporting Charles de Gaulle's proposal in the constitutional referendum, the Fifth Republic was established on 4 October 1958 under the Constitution of the Fifth Republic. While the Fourth Republic was a parliamentary republic, the Fifth Republic is a semi-presidential republic with a powerful presidency able to force through legislation without the consent of parliament.

The Fifth Republic has received various criticisms from some politicians and scholars, such as maintaining a poor or incorrect delineation of powers between the presidency and the legislature, with some describing the system as a presidential monarchy or as hyperpresidential.

== Background of the Fifth Republic ==
In the late 1950s, France experienced instability as the Fourth Republic began decolonisation. This resulted in protests among the pieds-noirs and French Army, particularly in the context of the Algerian War, which resulted in the attempted Algiers Putsch of 1958.

Despite having retired from politics a decade earlier, Charles de Gaulle placed himself in the midst of the crisis when he called on the nation to suspend the government and create a new constitution. With parliament unable to choose a government in the midst of popular protest, De Gaulle was carried to power when the last parliament of the Fourth Republic voted for its own dissolution and the convening of a constitutional convention.

On 1 June 1958, Charles de Gaulle was appointed head of the government; on 3 June 1958, a constitutional law empowered the new government to draft a new constitution of France. Designed by De Gaulle and drafted by Michel Debré, the new constitution saw a greatly empowered president, with the Prime Minister being appointed by the president, and accountable to both them and the Parliament. The constitution was put to referendum in 1958, and received the support of 82.6% of voters.

The constitution included various provisions to allow the president to force through legislation, such as Article 49.3 of the Constitution, which was used 100 times Between 4 October 1958 and 6 May 2023.

François Mitterrand was initially a leading critic of the establishment of the Fifth Republic, likening it to the 1851 French coup d'état by Louis Napoléon Bonaparte. Mitterrand would publish many of his criticisms of the new constitution, as well as Charles de Gaulle, in the Permanent Coup of State. Mitterrand would later give some legitimacy to the Fifth Republic when he was elected president.

== Advocacy for a new republic ==
=== Late 20th century ===
In 1992, Jean-Luc Mélenchon, Marie-Noëlle Lienemann and Julien Dray founded the Convention for the 6th Republic (Note: French: Convention de la VI^{e} République), a group within the Socialist Party (PS) advocating for constitutional reform. Mélenchon promoted the return of strong legislature by weakening the executive powers held by the president.

While campaigning for the 1995 presidential election, Jean-Marie Le Pen's included National Front's support for a Sixth Republic. Under Marine Le Pen the party has rebranded as National Rally and since distanced itself from the policy.

=== 2002 election ===
In the 2002 presidential election, part of Christiane Taubira's platform included support for a Sixth Republic, emphasising that it should decentralise power to French territories, and that it should destroy the position of Prime Minister.

=== 2007 election ===
In the 2007 presidential election, part of Ségolène Royal's and Francois Bayrou's platform included support for a Sixth Republic, including decentralisation, the strengthening of the Parliament, limiting the President to two terms, and removing the "exceptional powers" of the President during a state of emergency.

=== Left Front and La France Insoumise ===
In the 2012 presidential election, Jean-Luc Mélenchon, having left the PS and formed the Left Party (PG), ran under the Left Front platform, which supported the formation of a Sixth Republic.

In 2014, Movement for a Sixth Republic released an open letter calling for a Sixth Republic and gained over 100,000 signatures. Both Mélenchon, as well as Éric Coquerel, Coordinator of PG stated that support for a new republic couldn't come from any singular party, but had to build up broad consensus.

In the leadup to the 2017 presidential election, Mélenchon running under his new La France Insoumise (LFI) and endorsed by PG, held a march for the Sixth Republic in Paris during his campaign.

In the 2022 presidential election, Mélenchon ran again as the LFI candidate, and once more supported the formation of a new republic.

=== NUPES and the New Popular Front ===
For the 2022 legislative election, the New Ecological and Social People's Union (NUPES) was formed as a joint left-wing slate of candidates between parties such as the PS and LFI. Mélenchon, the founder of LFI, was considered a leading figure within NUPES, and support for a Sixth Republic was included on the alliance's platform. This policy was carried onto NUPES' successor, the New Popular Front, going into the 2024 legislative election.

=== 2023 pension reform protests ===
The 2023 pension reform law sparked debate about a Sixth French Republic after President Macron forced through the law. During the 2023 pension reform strikes, "Down with the Fifth Republic!" became a frequent slogan of protestors. Some politicians and academics described the protests as a political crisis that could spiral into a constitutional one, while others dismissed these notions.

== Proponents ==
=== Advocates on the left ===
The common platform of the NFP calls for a constituent assembly to prepare a new constitution and establish a Sixth Republic. Additionally, members of the New Popular Front (La France Insoumise, French Communist Party, The Ecologists, and Left Party) have all supported a Sixth Republic independently of the NFP.

Jean-Luc Mélenchon has been a long time advocate of a Sixth Republic.

=== Academic support ===
Patrick Martin-Genier has accused the Fifth Republic of authoritarianism that "allows the president to do what he wants" and stated that the current system must not continue.

Political scientist Raphaël Porteilla, has also described the Fifth Republic as authoritarian and as having hyperpresidency. Discussing the prospects of a Sixth Republic, and constitutional reform more broadly, Porteilla has said "the issue is not whether France should change its constitution, but whether it should change constitutions altogether"

== Publications ==
Multiple books and academic texts have been written about the prospects of a Sixth Republic.

Following the election of Valéry Giscard d'Estaing, French journalist Michèle Cotta wrote La Sixième République.

Constitutional academic Bastien François has written extensively about a Sixth Republic, such as La Constitution de la ^{6e} République (co-written with Arnaud Montebourg).

In 2021, Patrick Martin-Genier published Towards a Sixth Republic.

=== Texts rebutting a sixth republic ===
Some texts have also been written about the longevity of the current French Republic and unlikelihood of a Sixth Republic.

In 2008 marking the semicentennial of the Fifth French Republic, Ben Clift wrote The French Republic at 50, which discussed the longevity of the current regime.

In 2018 Julie Benetti published The Myth of the Sixth Republic in the journal Pouvoirs, as part of an issue analysing the Fifth Republic more broadly.

== See also ==
- Citizens Convention for Climate
- Proposed Fourth Polish Republic
