= Kaczyzm =

Polish political term

Kaczism Kaczyzm
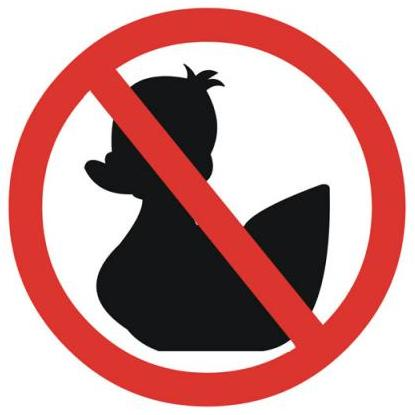
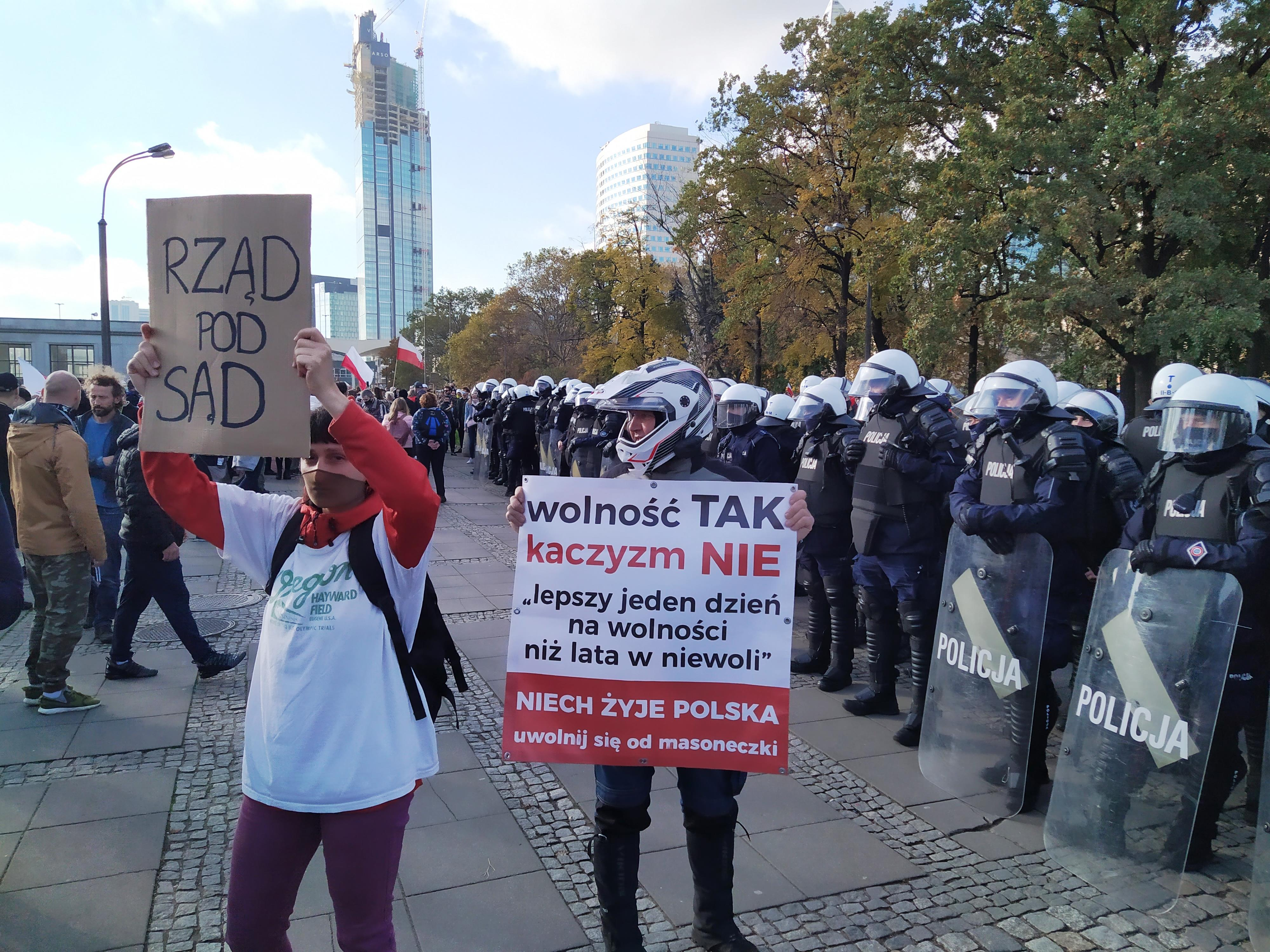
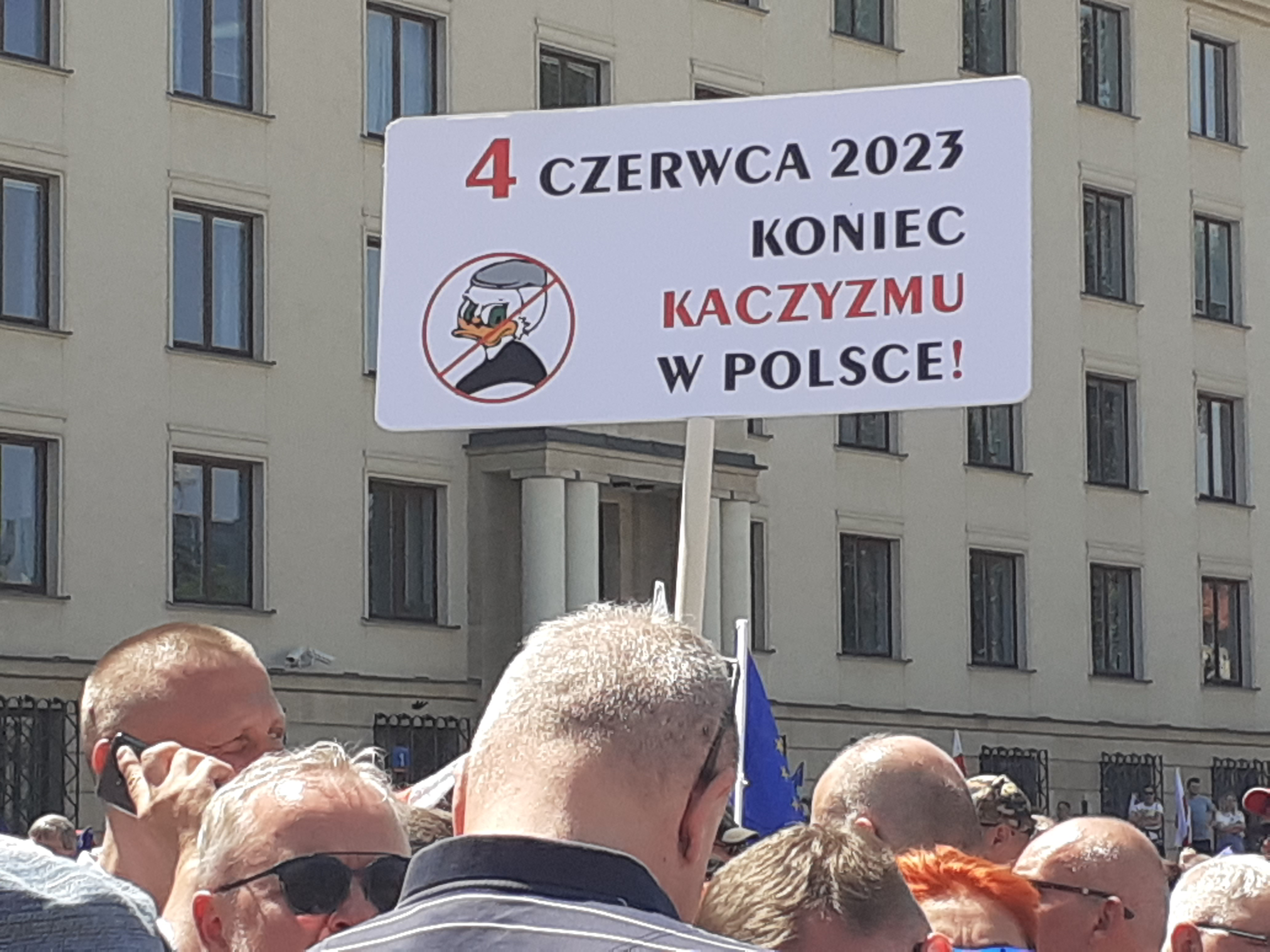
- Clockwise from top left: Anti-duck no symbol; Protest against anti-pandemic measures in Warsaw in 2020. The poster has text which translates as "Freedom YES, Kaczism NO"; An anti-Kaczism symbol in the form of ducks feet arranged as a swastika; An anti-Kaczism placard during the 2023 Polish protests
- Namesake: Jarosław Kaczyński; Lech Kaczyński
- Ideology: Current: National conservatism; Christian right; Statism; Soft Euroscepticism; Historical: Moderate conservatism; Secularism; Social market economy; Pro-Europeanism
- Political position: Current: Right-wing; Historical: Centre to centre-right
- National affiliation: Current: Law and Justice; Historical: Centre Agreement

Kaczyzm (lit. 'Kaczism') is a Polish neologism and an ideological concept (ideologeme) literally describing the rule of the Law and Justice party (PiS), derived from the names of Polish politicians, brothers Jarosław and Lech Kaczyński. As an ironic or propaganda term, it is used by opponents of the political groups of the Kaczyński brothers, while considered inaccurate and offensive by PiS supporters. Although in recent years the phrase has been reappropriated by supporters of PiS and is sometimes compared to Trumpism in the United States.

== History ==
This term was coined by Stanisław Janecki, the first deputy editor-in-chief of the weekly Wprost, which was then used in February 2005 by the publication's columnists, Robert Mazurek and Igor Zalewski, in an article titled Triumf kaczyzmu (transl. The triumph of Kaczyzm), as a pejorative definition of the political doctrine and vision of the state by Jarosław Kaczyński.

Shortly thereafter, during a debate in the Sejm on May 5 that year between the then governing Democratic Left Alliance (SLD) and the opposition PiS deputies, this term was used by deputy Joanna Senyszyn, who asserted that the latter party would, if it were to come to power following the parliamentary and presidential elections in autumn that year, institute a "non-democratic, fascist Fourth Polish Republic", which she saw as "kaczyzm approaching". She then added that "a specter is haunting Poland—the specter of kaczyzm", thus paraphrasing the first sentence of the Communist Manifesto. Due to her popularization of the slogan, the authorship is sometimes mistakenly attributed to Senyszyn.

== Usage and meaning ==
Kaczyzm, as a neologism for political ideology, is a type of ideological concept or ideologeme. It is one of the best known Polish-language examples of the linguistic construction in the form of derogatory neologisms based on the names of politicians and occurring in the context of political discourse. The popularity of this particular term may, as Bolt and Szerszunowicz argue, be attributed to the fact that the Kaczyński brothers are often pejoratively nicknamed Kaczory (transl. drakes) or Kaczki (transl. ducks). A few other derivative terms, which are also pejorative, exist, such as kaczysta (lit. 'Kaczist', a supporter of the Kaczyńskis' policies) and antykaczyzm (lit. 'anti-Kaczism'), of which the latter was used by Jarosław Kaczyński himself.

Similar terms exist in Polish (e.g. lepperyzm, tuskizm), and other languages, including English (see Bennism, Blairism, Thatcherism). They are usually pejorative and intend to emphasize the boundaries of 'we' vs 'others', and to easily label political opponents.

This concept is still often used on the pages of the media outlets critical of PiS party, such as the weekly Newsweek Polska. In an interview to the left-wing NIE newspaper December 2005, when asked to clarify what kaczyzm meant to her, Senyszyn defined the term as "the Polish variation of 21st-century totalitarianism... [in which] everything mixes: limitations on democracy, a peculiar type of oppression, censorship... [Kaczyzm] exists in a camouflaged form. It is dressed in the garment of social solidarity, patriotism and moral renewal". According to Wojciech Szalkiewicz, kaczyzm means a system based on "permanent control, investigative scandals, appointing super-offices and ad hoc commissions of inquiry", while Leszek Balcerowicz described Kaczism as "unprecedented attacks on the institutions combined with unsubstantiated attacks against judges".

== See also ==
- The dictionary definition of kaczyzm at Wiktionary
- Fourth Polish Republic
- Mohair berets
- Układ
- Negative campaigning
