= Andrzej Rozenek =

Polish politician

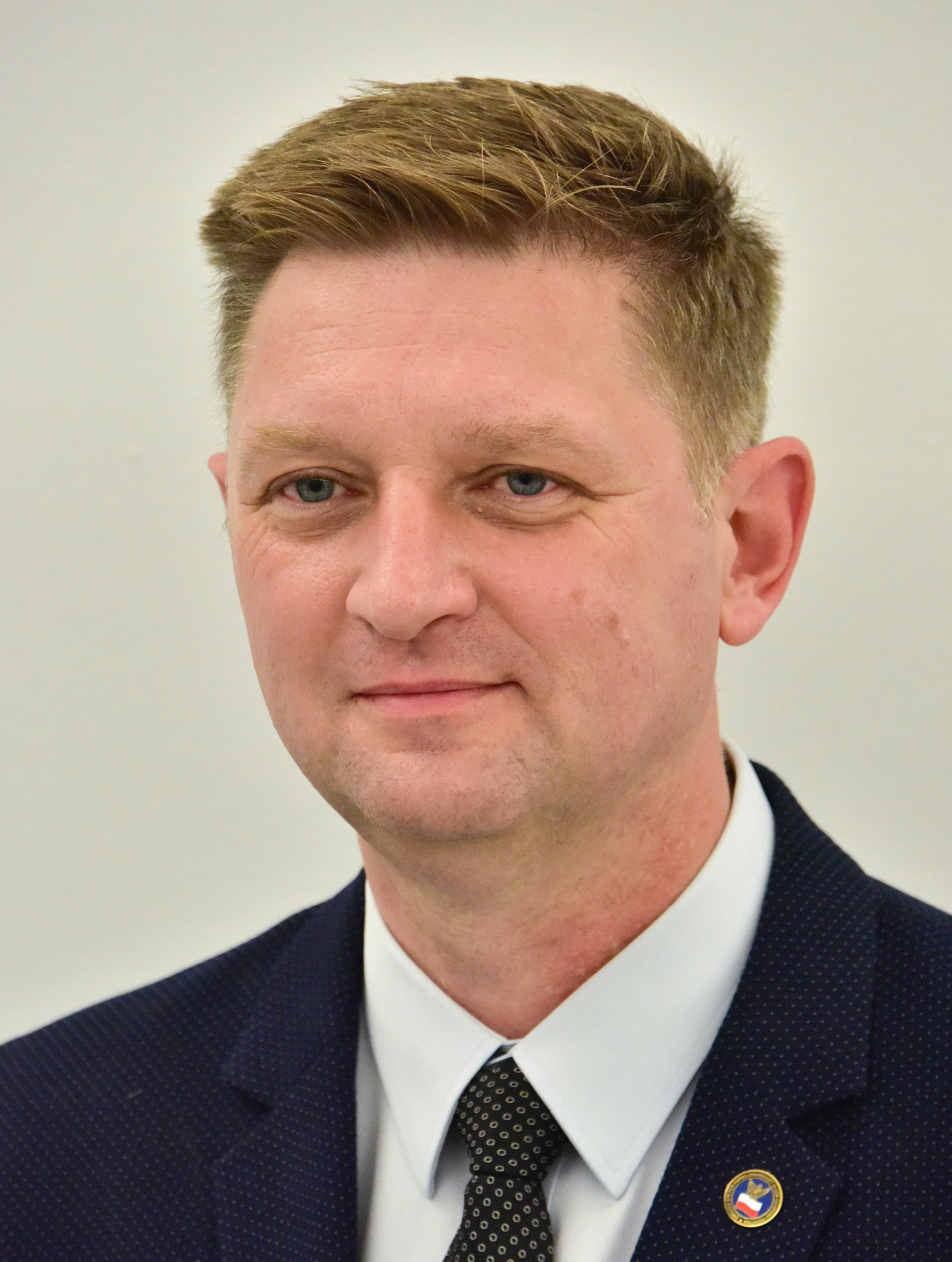

Member of the Sejm
- In office 8 November 2011 – 11 November 2015
- In office 12 November 2019 – 12 November 2023

Personal details
- Born: 17 March 1969 (age 57) Warsaw, Poland
- Party: Polish Socialist Party
- Other political affiliations: Democratic Left Alliance; Your Movement; Biało-Czerwoni; Democratic Left Association (2023-)

Andrzej Rozenek (born 17 March 1969) is a Polish journalist and politician. Member of the Sejm for Polish Socialist Party. In 2006-2011 and 2015-2019 he was a deputy editor-in-chief of Nie magazine.

== Electoral history ==
Sejm
Election	Party	Votes	%	Constituency	Elected?
1993	Democratic Left Alliance	708	0.08	Warsaw I	No
2011	Palikot's Movement	15,793	3.92	Katowice II	Yes
2019	Democratic Left Alliance	38,495	6.43	Warsaw II	Yes

During his political career he also took part in elections for President of Warsaw receiving 2.3% of votes in 2014 and 1.5% in 2018.
