= TKM (Polish term) =

TKM (Polish: Teraz, kurwa, my, [ˈtɛras ˈkurva mɨ], lit. "Now, fucking, we [are in power]", used to mean "It's our fucking turn now") is an expression used by numerous Polish politicians and journalists. It references a "winner mentality" which prevails typically after an election victory. Guided by a view of "us and them", the victorious party would divide political positions between themselves and their cronies, replacing the officials of the prior government with their own people. The phrase became a classic political quotation in Poland, and was repeatedly quoted and repeated (often in relation to actions by successive Polish governments).

The term "TKM" was first used publicly by Jarosław Kaczyński in a 1997 interview for „Gazeta Wyborcza”, while explaining the reasons why he did not run in the elections to the Sejm on the AWS ticket, although he was one of the founders of his formation. He argued that "TKM", an informal "faction" of AWS, had become demonstrably too prominent. This "faction" was characterized by relentlessness in acquiring government positions and simply replacing its predecessors to gain the benefits of their position, without making reforms. Years later, Kaczyński stated that the term "TKM" was invented by Marek Kuchciński.

In 2005, Marek Borowski, after an unexpected selection by Law and Justice of Kazimierz Marcinkiewicz as a candidate for prime minister, re-interpreted the slogan as "teraz kolega Marcinkiewicz" ("and now, colleague Marcinkiewicz").
