= Janina Goss =

Polish political activist (born 1943)

- Born: 5 February 1943 (age 83); Poland
- Education: University of Łódź
- Occupations: lawyer, political activist
- Political party: Law and Justice; Centre Agreement
- Board member of: Srebrna (since July 2012)

Janina Kazimiera Goss (born 5 February 1943) is a Polish political activist and a member of the organizational structure of the Law and Justice party.

She graduated from law faculty of University of Łódź. She has been called the most important Law and Justice politician in the Łódź region, where she started her political career in the early 1990s, in the Centre Agreement. From 2007 to 2009 she headed the Supervisory Board for the Polish state broadcaster TVP, where she has been a member of the board since 2006. Formally, she is a treasurer in the Łódź local structure for the Law and Justice party; she has never been elected to any public position. She has refused any interviews with the press.

She has been a subject of several controversies in Polish politics, mostly focused on whether she has some undue influence in Polish politics through her connection to the Law and Justice leader Jarosław Kaczyński, to whom she is considered a close friend and trusted advisor. She has been called the Law and Justice's "power behind the throne" and "the most important woman" in the party; and even "the most important woman in [Polish] politics".

In 2011 she lent a significant sum of money to Kaczyński, who for a significant period of time refused to disclose the source of the loan; her name was revealed in 2014 following a request from the Polish parliament ethics committee. She was appointed a director of Polska Grupa Energetyczna, a government-run energy company in 2017. Her above-average earnings there have been discussed in the media as a contradiction of the promise set out by Law and Justice to reduce the earnings of directors of such companies.
