= Michał Janiszewski (politician, born 1926) =

Polish general and politician

Head of the Council of Ministers Office
- In office 12 November 1985 – 12 September 1989
- Preceded by: Stanisław Marcinkowski
- Succeeded by: Jacek Ambroziak

Head of the Chancellery of the President of the Republic of Poland
- In office 13 September 1989 – 21 December 1990
- Succeeded by: Jarosław Kaczyński

Personal details
- Born: 15 June 1926 Poznań, Second Polish Republic
- Died: 3 February 2016 (aged 89) Warsaw, Poland
- Party: Polish United Workers' Party

Military service
- Allegiance: Polish People's Republic, Poland
- Branch/service: Polish People's Army; Polish Armed Forces
- Years of service: 1950–1991
- Rank: Generał dywizji (Major general)

Division General Michał Janiszewski (15 June 1926 – 3 February 2016) was a Polish officer and public official.

A close aide of General Wojciech Jaruzelski, he served for a number of years as his chief of cabinet. First when Jaruzelski was Minister of Defense (1972–1981). When Jaruzelski became a Prime Minister in 1981, Janiszewski was the head of the office of the Council of Ministers under him and the two next Prime Ministers - Zbigniew Messner and Mieczysław Rakowski.

After Jaruzelski was elected President, Janiszewski became the first chief of the Office of the President of the Republic of Poland (until December 1989 People's Republic of Poland). He was a chief of the office from September 1989 until Jaruzelski stepped down on 22 December 1990.

Janiszewski was also a member of the Military Council of National Salvation (1981–1983).

In 1976, he was promoted to the rank of brigadier general, and in 1983 to the rank of major general. He was a doctor of military science. In December 1990, he ended his professional military service and public activity. In January 1991, at the age of 64, he was retired.

He died on February 3, 2016 at the age of 89 and was buried on February 11, 2016 at the Junikowo cemetery in Poznań. The date of the funeral was not made public, the funeral was exclusively a family funeral. He was wrongly declared dead by the Institute of National Remembrance 9 years earlier, which is why he was omitted from the accusation of the group introducing martial law.

== Awards and decorations ==
- Polish:
  - Order of the Banner of Labour, 1st Class
  - Commander's Cross of the Order of Polonia Restituta
  - Knight's Cross of the Order of Polonia Restituta
  - Gold Cross of Merit
  - Medal of the 30th Anniversary of People's Poland
  - Medal of the 40th Anniversary of People's Poland
  - Gold Medal of the Armed Forces in the Service of the Fatherland
  - Silver Medal of the Armed Forces in the Service of the Fatherland
  - Bronze Medal of the Armed Forces in the Service of the Fatherland
  - Medal of the 10th Anniversary of People's Poland
  - Gold Medal of Merit for National Defence
  - Silver Medal of Merit for National Defence
  - Bronze Medal of Merit for National Defence
  - Medal of the National Education Commission
  - Bronze Badge "For merits in the protection of public order"
- Foreign:
  - Order of the Red Star (Czechoslovakia)
  - Order of Freedom and Independence, 2nd Class (North Korea)
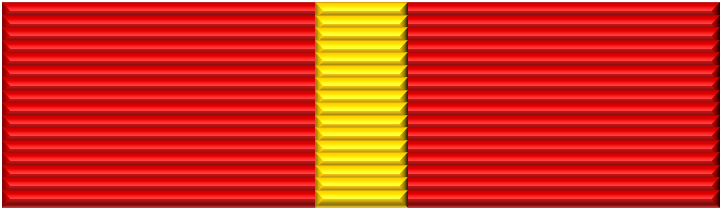
  - Friendship Medal (Vietnam)
  - Bronze Combat Order of Merit for the People and the Fatherland (East Germany)
  - Order of Friendship of Peoples (USSR)
  - Medal "For Strengthening of Brotherhood in Arms" (USSR)
  - Jubilee Medal "60 Years of the Armed Forces of the USSR" (USSR)
