= New Wave (Polish political party) =

Political party in Poland

Professor Senyszyn's New Wave Nowa Fala Profesor Senyszyn
- Abbreviation: Nowa Fala; NF
- Founders: Joanna Senyszyn; Robert Kwiatkowski; Marek Balt
- Founded: 28 August 2025
- Registered: 9 December 2025
- Headquarters: 01-230 Warsaw; Skierniewicka 14, 69A
- Ideology: Social democracy Anti-clericalism; Pro-Europeanism
- Political position: Centre-left to left-wing
- Colours: Pink

Website
- nowafala.org

Professor Senyszyn's New Wave (Polish: Nowa Fala Profesor Senyszyn, NF) is a political party in Poland. Founded and registered in 2025, it is a centre-left to left-wing party.

== History ==
=== Senyszyn and Nonpartisans ===
Joanna Senyszyn was a candidate in the 2025 Polish presidential election. Senyszyn was a longtime activist and poseł of the Democratic Left Alliance, although she quit it in 2021 and cofounded the Democratic Left Association. She was supported in her campaign by the Democratic Left Association and Nonpartisans, a minor anti-establishment party chaired by Piotr Bakun with various ties to Bezpartyjni Samorządowcy (which it split from) and the far-right Confederation. Senyszyn claims to have been compelled to run by the Nonpartians, although another candidate affiliated with the Nonpartisans, Wojciech Papis, the party's secretary, also tried to run, but failed to gather the necessary 100,000 support signatures. Despite support from Nonpartisans, Senyszyn was accused of having her 100,000 support signatures forged. Bakun became Senyszyn's campaign plenipotentiary. Following Bakun's migration to New Wave, he was succeeded as chairman of Nonpartisans by Kamil Suchański.

=== Preliminary organization ===
In the presidential election, Senyszyn obtained 1.09% of the vote, coming 9th out of 13 candidates. During the election, she was described as anti-clerical, and left-wing. After the first round of the election, Senyszyn at first declared that she could "only support a true revolutionary" in the second round, but she eventually endorsed Rafał Trzaskowski of Civic Platform. On 22 May, Senyszyn announced that she would organize a new political party.

Initially, the party had the placeholder name "Senyszyn's Empire" and later "Red Corals", both references to elements of Senyszyn's presidential campaign. In June, New Left leader Robert Biedroń acknowledged the not yet registered party, imploring it to join the New Left on a single electoral list. Senyszyn also announced a youth wing of the party. According to Senyszyn, the party received around 10,000 signups after its announcement.

Ultimately, the party adopted the name "New Wave", implying a "new wave to sweep away the old political world", after a vote on Facebook, with the name winning against "Democracy", "Party of Stars", "Tomorrow's Generation" It was joined by former Democratic Left Alliance politicians Robert Kwiatkowski and Marek Balt as well as Piotr Bakun.

=== Establishment ===
New Wave applied for registration on 28 August 2025. On 19 October, Senyszyn declared that the party would be registered in 1.5 months at latest. On 28 November, Senyszyn stated that she is still waiting for the party to be registered. The party was ultimately registered on 9 December. Apart from Senyszyn, the founders of the party were Robert Kwiatkowski, the former director of Telewizja Polska, and Marek Balt, a left-wing Member of European Parliament.

In September, Dariusz Cychol, a pro-Russian journalist, was revealed as a Senyszyn's business partner and assistant in founding the party. Senyszyn responded by stating that she "does not follow the lives of her partners", claimed the information is false, and stated her condemnation of Russia. In an October 2025 poll, the party polled 1.6%, overperforming the long-standing Polish People's Party, which polled 1.3% instead.

In November 2025, the leader of the New Left Włodzimierz Czarzasty, who was elected the Marshal of the Sejm, declared his intention to create a joint electoral list of left-leaning parties for the Next Polish parliamentary election, composed of New Left, Razem and New Wave. Senyszyn rebuked this proposal, describing Czarzasty as "slimy" and arguing that he had "privatised his party and turned it into his own private fiefdom." She stated her opposition to Czarzasty becoming the Marshal of the Sejm, calling him incompetent and accusing him, along with President Nawrocki, of abusing their power. She criticized the presence of New Left in the coalition, describing it as submissive towards the Civic Coalition. She stated that "the fight against poverty and inequality, women's and minority rights, and preventing PiS from returning to power" would be the main objectives of New Wave.

On 5 January 2026, Senyszyn announced that the party's registration was confirmed and the party would begin admitting members. She also declared that the party would have a youth wing, as from the ~10,000 persons that declared their willingness to join the party, almost 2,000 were under the age of 18. Senyszyn stated that the party has "dozens of local groups and several expert groups that are developing programmes at the national, regional and district levels." In January 2026, the party also founded its own agricultural club, led by Adam Janicki.

=== Activity ===
In January 2026, the party's co-founder Piotr Bakun sparked controversy for condemning the 2026 United States strikes in Venezuela that resulted in abduction of Venezuelan President Nicolás Maduro by US forces in an interview with the conservative Telewizja Republika station. Bakun condemned the US actions "as a Christian and a representative of a centre-left party", stating that the abduction starts a precedent towards similar operations in the future, including potential invasion of Taiwan or escalation of the Russo-Ukrainian War. He stated: "We should not praise this type of action. If we do, it means that a superpower like the US can enter any country and arrest and try its president. This is simply wrong."

The party denounced the EU–Mercosur Association Agreement, calling it "one of the greatest threats to Polish agriculture in many years" and accusing the government of failing to take a clear stance, stating that the ruling coalition should have expressed its opposition much earlier and prevented the deal from passing.

== Leadership ==
Senyszyn announced that the party would be managed democratically, with her name as part of the party's name serving to increase recognition, and claiming that she would not be the party's leader but its "mother". However, later she stated that while she initially did not have such plans, her supporters expected her to become the party's president. As a way to implement democracy in the party, Senyszyn declared that out of the 920 places on the party's electoral lists for the Sejm and 100 places for the Senate, she will handpick 20 candidates while leaving the remaining 1000 seats to be democratically nominated by the party members.

== Ideology ==
Senyszyn distanced the party from the left–right political spectrum, stating that the party would be "democratic, modern and rational", anti-clerical, and pro-European. The party has been described as centre-left, left-wing, and its policy proposals have also been described as left-wing. Commenting on the party's political orientation, Senyszyn stated: "Today, the terms ‘left’ and ‘right’ are no longer used because they have lost their original meaning. For example, PiS is a somewhat left-wing party, but in terms of social issues and human rights, it is strongly conservative, if not reactionary. Therefore, I will simply say that the party will be democratic, modern and rational, just like me." Senyszyn was also described as a feminist.

The party postulates the elimination of financial privileges for Churches, secularization, sex education in schools, fight against inequality, preventing the return of Law and Justice to power, support for women's right to self-determination and LGBT rights, a 'reasonable compromise between the interests of employers and employees', and economic deregulation. Senyszyn stressed that the party will seek "effective deregulation of the economy", and simplifying the tax system to benefit small business. She declared herself "in favour of greater [economic] liberalism", argued that the Polish economy is "overregulated", and praised the deregulatory proposals of Rafał Brzoska. Senyszyn also postulates a nationwide night-time alcohol ban. She opposes spending 5% of Polish GDP on the military, arguing that 3 to 3.5% would be sufficient. She stated her belief that there will be no Russia-NATO war, and praised EU countries for increasing their defense spending from 2 to 3.5%, which was her long-time proposal.

After its registration, Senyszyn stated that anti-clericalism is the crucial part of the party's ideology. She stated: "I argue that most of the problems we have in Poland stem from it being a clerical, religious state, in which the clergy not only influences law-making, but also draws huge sums of money from the state budget. There will be no right to self-determination for women or LGBT rights as long as we have a clerical state. There will not even be rights for animals, because the Church does not take an honest position on this issue either. The Church also constitutes unfair competition for businesses. All it has to do is declare that its profits will be used for religious purposes and it no longer pays tax. It also does not pay other taxes, such as property tax. That is why it must end."

The party seeks to present itself as a party for the youth, pursuing the electorate of The Left. In contrast, Polityka characterized the party as "supported by at most a few SLD veterans at odds with Czarzasty." Senyszyn announced several goals for the party, among which entry into the Sejm, necessarily crossing the 5% electoral threshold, introducting 50 posełs to the Sejm, 11% of the total amount, and stopping the Law and Justice (PiS) party from returning to power since its loss in 2023. Senyszyn also denounced the PiS-supported president, Karol Nawrocki, as "unworthy" of the office. She ruled out joining the electoral list of the Civic Coalition. Senyszyn argues that "the Civic Platform and its allies will no longer be able to protect us from the return of PiS to power".

Senyszyn declared that ending "lesser evilism" for liberal voters would be the main purpose of her party. She opposed the nomination of Włodzimierz Czarzasty of New Left for Marshal of the Sejm, accusing the New Left of "stepping into PiS shoes" through using undemocratic means and of being submissive towards its right-leaning coalition partners. She states that the New Left "have a few incoherent slogans and only care about their seats". Senyszyn also criticizes the Razem party, accusing it of being "[programmatically] close to PiS". She referenced the horseshoe theory, claiming that Razem is "standing quite close to the wall on the left", and "on the wall of the right is Konfederacja, and their backs are almost touching".
