= Military Council of National Salvation =

1981–1983 ruling military junta of Poland

- Wojskowa Rada Ocalenia Narodowego
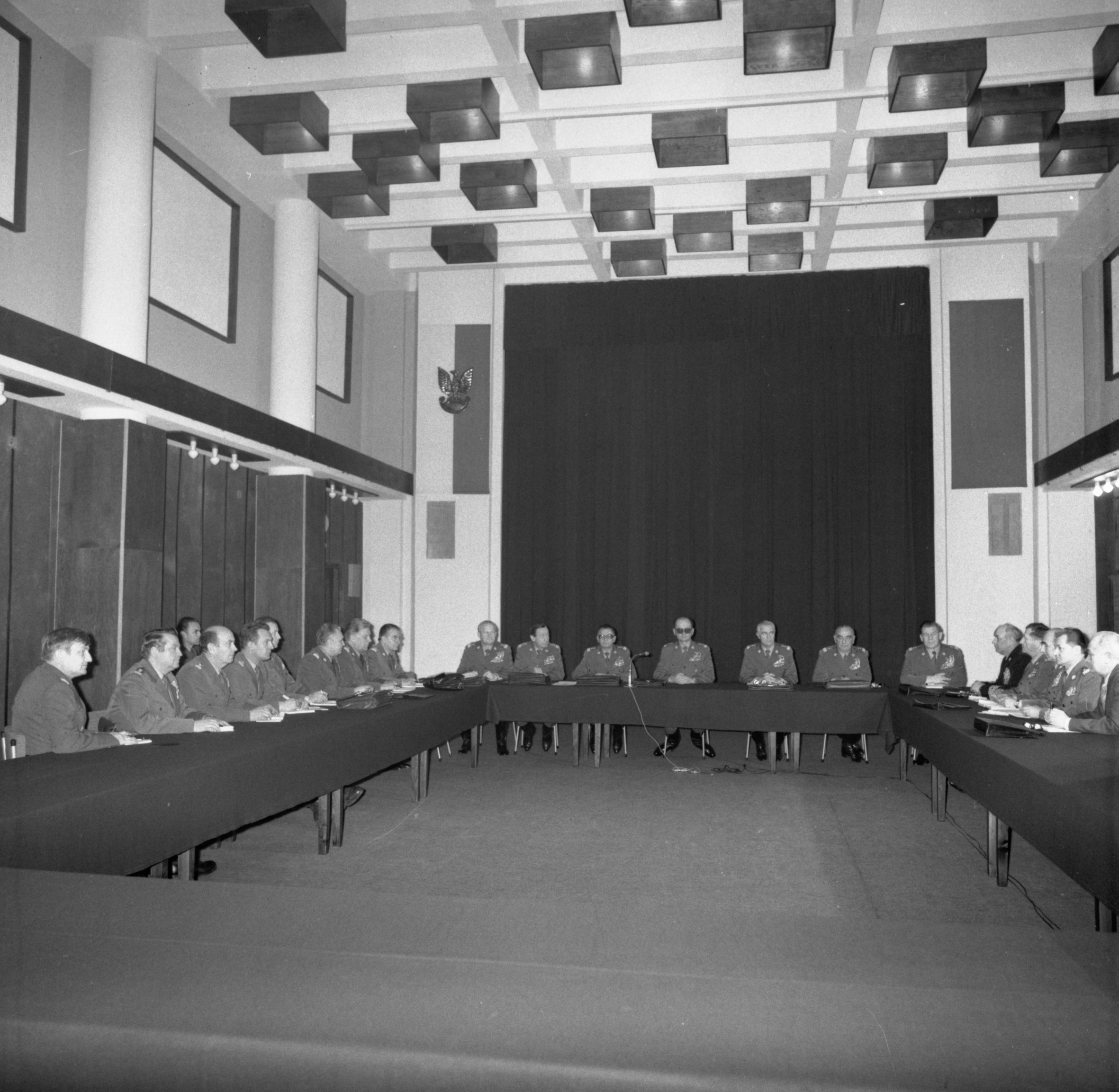
- Meeting of the Military Council of National Salvation on 14 December 1981

Agency overview
- Formed: 13 December 1981
- Dissolved: 22 July 1983
- Jurisdiction: Polish People's Republic
- Motto: Ocalimy ojczyznę naszą Polske
- Agency executive: Wojciech Jaruzelski

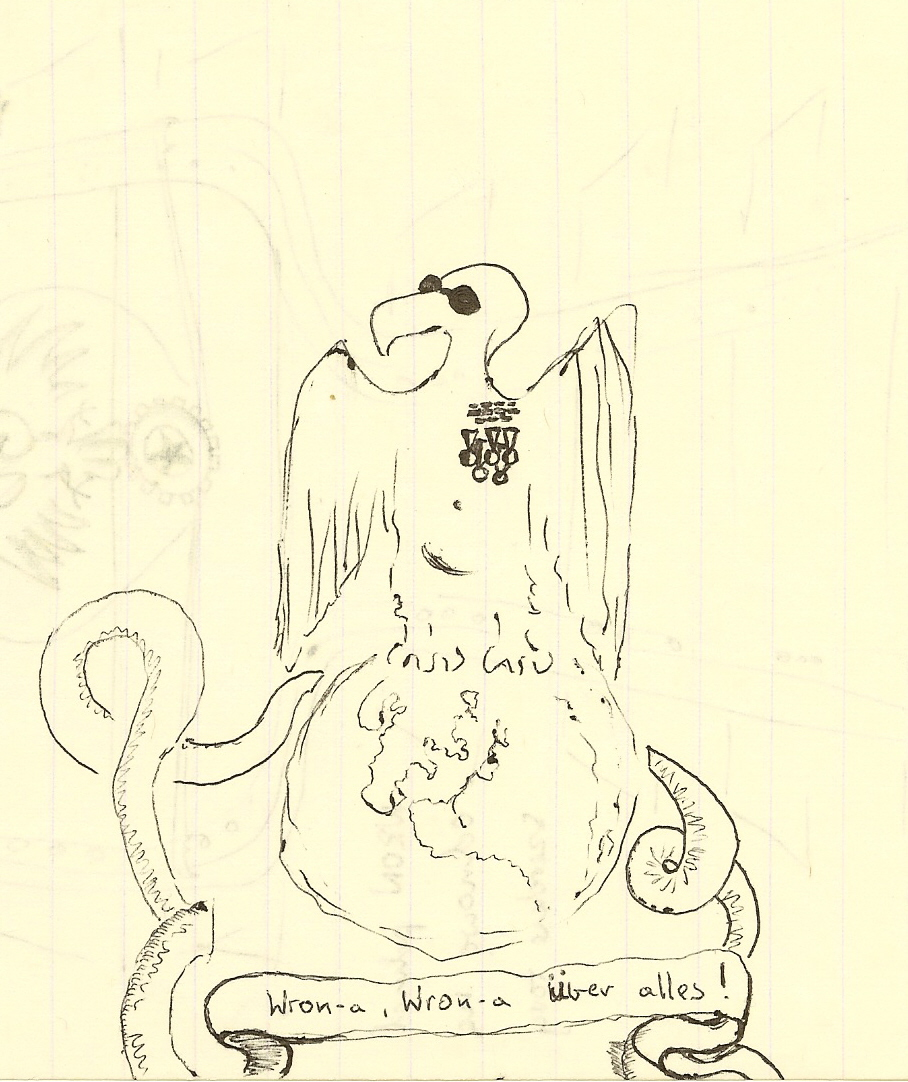
"WRONa, WRONa über alles", a political leaflet caricature from the 1980s. The "crow" is wearing sunglasses much like General Jaruzelski often did

The Military Council of National Salvation (Polish: Wojskowa Rada Ocalenia Narodowego, abbreviated to WRON) was a military junta administering the Polish People's Republic during the period of martial law in Poland between 1981 and 1983.

It was headed by General and First Secretary of the Polish United Workers' Party Wojciech Jaruzelski. It is also the only military junta to ever take charge of an Eastern Bloc nation, as all other contemporaries were headed by political communists rather than their military counterparts. Depending on the classification of the Soviet Union under Joseph Stalin, Jaruzelski's rule (1981-1990) was also either the only one or one of two times in history where a communist nation was led by a career army commander.

== History ==
The body was created on 13 December 1981, and was dissolved on 22 July 1983. It consisted of 21 members: fifteen generals, one admiral and five colonels. Among the most notable members were generals Wojciech Jaruzelski, Florian Siwicki, Michał Janiszewski and Czesław Kiszczak. One member, Lt. Col. Mirosław Hermaszewski, was included without his consent or knowledge.

In the beginning of 1982, the Citizens' Committees of National Salvation were formed, composed mostly of PZPR members. In July 1982, they joined the newly formed Patriotic Movement for National Rebirth.

The lettering of the Polish acronym (WRON; wrona meaning a crow in Polish) was immediately picked up by those that the regime sought to repress and widely used in a form of non-violent opposition through jokes. One saying was that "orła wrona nie pokona" ('the crow won't defeat the eagle', a white eagle being the national symbol of Poland).

== Aftermath ==
In 2006, the Chief Commission for the Prosecution of Crimes against the Polish Nation accused WRON members of committing a communist crime. On January 12, 2012, the Warsaw District Court upheld the indictment that WRON was an unlawful criminal armed enterprise which was formed and acted in violation of the Polish constitution. According to the court, the conspiratory group consisted of Wojciech Jaruzelski, Czesław Kiszczak, Florian Siwicki and Tadeusz Tuczapski. Only Kiszczak was arraigned and convicted (4 years of imprisonment, halved under the amnesty, 5 years probation) and proceedings against the rest were suspended or discontinued due to poor health or death of the defendants.

== Sources ==
- WRON at Portal Wiedzy onet.pl Encyclopedia
- Tygodnik Powszechny. Między sprawiedliwością a wymiarem sprawiedliwości by Mateusz Szpytma. 7 December 2011
