= Stanisław Ehrlich =

Polish jurist (1907–1997)

- Born: 27 October 1907; Przemyśl, Congress Poland
- Died: 2 October 1997 (aged 89); Warsaw, Poland
- Occupation: Jurist

Stanisław Ehrlich (27 October 1907 – 2 October 1997) was a Polish jurist and theorist of state and law. He was a professor at the University of Warsaw.

== Biography ==
Son of Salomon and Klara, borther of Juliusz. His father and brother were lawyers. Parents taught him at home. From 1916, he attended folk school (Volksschule). In 1925 he graduated with matura from the Kazimierz Morawski Gymnasium in Lviv. He joined Związek Niezależnej Młodzieży Socjalistycznej. In 1930 he obtained doctorate in law at the Jagiellonian University upon dissertation Stanowisko prawne cudzoziemców we Francji na tle stosunków ludnościowych. From 1932 to 1939 he worked at the General Counsel to the Republic of Poland.

After the Nazi invasion of Poland, he lived in Lviv. There, he worked as the director of the sports stadium, and subsequently a planning official at the Regional Office for Physical Culture. From 1940 to 1941, he was an associate professor at Ivan Franko University.

Following the Third Reich's aggression against the USSR, he evacuated to Kyiv. He volunteered for the Red Army. In 1942 he joined Union of Polish Patriots. In August 1943, he became a political officer in the Tadeusz Kościuszko 1st Infantry Division, and in 1944, a member of the Polish Workers' Party (Polska Partia Robotnicza; PPR). His mother, brother Juliusz, sister-in-law Barbara, niece Janina, aunt Dorota and cousin Olga died in the Holocaust.

In December 1945 he was employed in the Ministry of Justice. From 1945 to 1947 he worked at the University of Łódź. In 1946 he founded journal Państwo i Prawo, and was its editor-in-chief until 1966. From 1948 to 1978 he worked at the University of Warsaw. From 1950 he was secretary of the basic organization of the Polish United Workers' Party (PZPR) at the University of Warsaw. Security Service investigated his two meetings with Zbigniew Brzeziński in October 1966. He retired in 1975. His doctoral students included Jarosław Kaczyński and Maciej Łętowski. He was buried at the Powązki Cemetery.

== Works ==
Monographs:

- Zagadnienia praworządności. 1945.
- Ustrój Związku Radzieckiego. Vol. I–II. Warsaw. 1954–1956.
- Praworządność – Sejm. 1956.
- „Grupy nacisku” w społecznej strukturze kapitalizmu. 1962.
- Władza i interesy: studium struktury politycznej kapitalizmu. 1967.
- Wstęp do nauki o państwie i prawie. 1970.
- Oblicza pluralizmów. 1980.
- O polityczno-prawnych uwarunkowaniach procesów społeczno-gospodarczych. 1980.
- Dynamika norm. Podstawowe zagadnienia wiążących wzorców zachowania. 1994.
- Norma, grupa, organizacja. 1997.

Editions:

- Studia z teorii prawa. 1966.

== Awards ==
- Knight's Cross of the Order of Polonia Restituta (20 December 1946)
- Gold Cross of Merit (28 September 1954)
- Medal of the 10th Anniversary of People's Poland (19 January 1955)
