= Marek Balt =

Polish politician

Marek Balt MEP
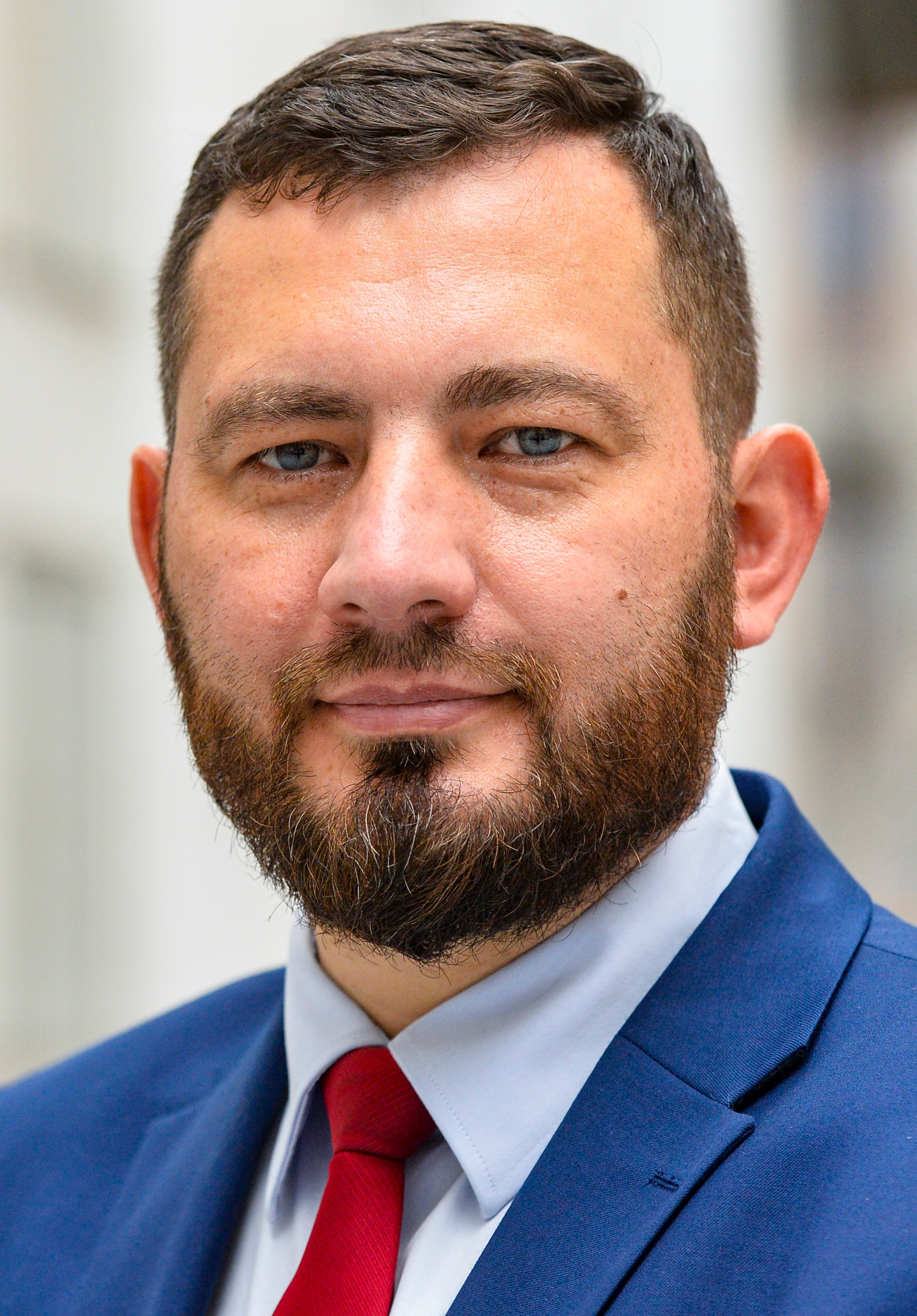

Member of European Parliament
- In office 1 July 2019 – 9 June 2024

Personal details
- Born: 8 April 1973 (age 53) Częstochowa, Poland
- Party: Democratic Left Alliance (until 2021); New Left (since 2021-2025); New Wave (since 2025)
- Other political affiliations: European Coalition (2019); Progressive Alliance of Socialists and Democrats (Since 2019)
- Education: Częstochowa University of Technology
- Occupation: politician, economist

Marek Paweł Balt (born 8 April 1973) is a Polish politician and economist who has been serving as a Member of the European Parliament since the 2019 elections.

== Early life and education ==
Balt holds a Master's degree in business management from the Częstochowa University of Technology. In 2017, he also graduated from WSB University (Wyższa Szkoła Biznesu w Dąbrowie Górniczej until 15 April 2018).

== Political career ==
=== Career in local politics ===
In 2004, Balt first ran for elections to the European Parliament as Poland became a member of the European Union. As he did not manage to get a place at the European Parliament that year, later in the local elections in 2006 and in 2010, he was elected to Częstochowa City Council. From 2010 to 2011, he was the chairman of the City Council.

=== Member of the Parliament of Poland, 2011–2015 ===
In the parliamentary elections in 2011, he obtained a parliamentary mandate and received 5378 votes. In 2012, he was elected as a chairman of the SLD structures in the Silesian Voivodeship. During his service at the Polish Parliament, Balt was a member of the Health Committee, member of the Committee for Environmental Protection, Natural Resources and Forestry, member of the Committee for Senior Affairs, and vice-chairman of the standing subcommittee for monitoring waste management. In the 2015 parliamentary elections, he did not get a place again.

On 23 January 2016, Balt became vice-chairman of SLD. In the local elections in 2018, Balt was elected a councilor to the Silesian Regional Assembly.

=== Member of the European Parliament, 2019–present ===
Balt has been a Member of the European Parliament since the 2019 European elections, representing the Silesian Voivodeship. In parliament, he has since been serving on the Committee on the Environment, Public Health and Food Safety. In addition to his committee assignments, he is part of the parliament's delegation for relations with the countries of Southeast Asia and the Association of Southeast Asian Nations (ASEAN).
