= Jarosław Kaczyński =

Member of the parliament, Prime Minister of Poland from 2006 to 2007

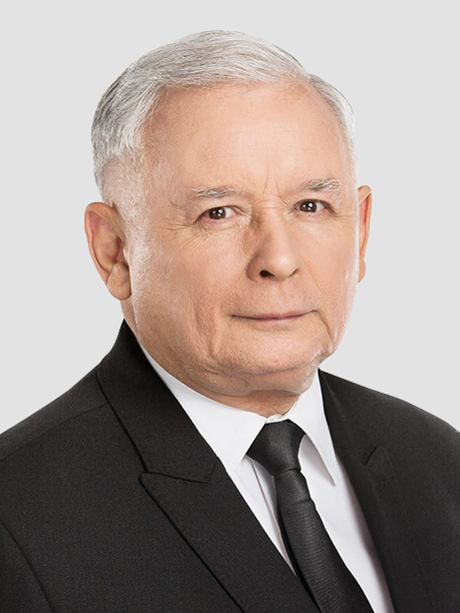
- Official portrait, 2020

Deputy Prime Minister of Poland
- In office 21 June 2023 – 27 November 2023
- Prime Minister: Mateusz Morawiecki
- Preceded by: See list: Mariusz Błaszczak; Piotr Gliński; Henryk Kowalczyk; Jacek Sasin
- Succeeded by: See list: Władysław Kosiniak-Kamysz; Krzysztof Gawkowski
- In office 6 October 2020 – 21 June 2022
- Prime Minister: Mateusz Morawiecki
- Preceded by: Jadwiga Emilewicz
- Succeeded by: Mariusz Błaszczak

Prime Minister of Poland
- In office 14 July 2006 – 16 November 2007
- President: Lech Kaczyński
- Deputy: See list: Ludwik Dorn; Zyta Gilowska; Przemysław Gosiewski; Andrzej Lepper; Roman Giertych
- Preceded by: Kazimierz Marcinkiewicz
- Succeeded by: Donald Tusk

Leader of Law and Justice
- Incumbent
- Assumed office 18 January 2003
- General Secretary: See list: Joachim Brudziński (8 July 2006 - 12 January 2008); Jarosław Zieliński (12 January 2008 - 10 October 2009); Krzysztof Sobolewski (4 July 2021- 25 October 2023); Piotr Milowański (acting; 25 October 2023 - 16 December 2023); Piotr Milowański (since 16 December 2023)
- Parliamentary Leader: See list: Ludwik Dorn (18 January 2003 - 3 November 2005); Przemysław Gosiewski ( 3 November 2005 - 19 July 2006); Marek Kuchciński (19 July 2006 - 13 November 2007); Przemysław Gosiewski (13 November 2007 - 6 January 2010); Grażyna Gęsicka (6 January 2010 - 10 April 2010); Marek Kuchciński (acting; 10 April 2010 - 3 August 2010); Mariusz Błaszczak (3 August 2010 - 11 November 2015); Ryszard Terlecki (11 November 2015 - 23 November 2023); Mariusz Błaszczak (since 23 November 2023)
- Preceded by: Lech Kaczyński

Chief of the Presidential Chancellery
- In office 22 December 1990 – 31 October 1991
- President: Lech Wałęsa
- Preceded by: Michał Janiszewski
- Succeeded by: Janusz Ziółkowski

Member of the Sejm
- Incumbent
- Assumed office 31 October 1997
- Constituency: 33 – Kielce (2023–present); 19 – Warsaw I (1997–2023)
- In office 6 December 1991 – 26 October 1993
- Constituency: Warsaw I

Personal details
- Born: Jarosław Aleksander Kaczyński; 18 June 1949 (age 77) Warsaw, Poland
- Party: Law and Justice (since 2001)
- Other political affiliations: Solidarity (before 1991); Centre Agreement (1991–1997); Solidarity Electoral Action (1997–2001)
- Relatives: Lech Kaczyński (twin brother)
- Education: University of Warsaw (LL.D.)
- Profession: Lawyer
- Awards: St. George's Order of Victory Order of Prince Yaroslav the Wise

Jarosław Aleksander Kaczyński (Polish: [jaˈrɔ.swaf alɛkˈsandɛr kaˈt͡ʂɘ̟ɲ.skʲi]; born 18 June 1949) is a Polish politician. He co-founded the Law and Justice (PiS) party in 2001 with his twin brother, Lech Kaczyński, and has served as its leader since 2003. He served as Prime Minister of Poland from 2006 to 2007, and has twice held the post of Deputy Prime Minister of Poland, first from 2020 to 2022, and a second time from June to November 2023. He is considered to have been the éminence grise of Poland, when PiS formed the government in 2005–2007 and again in 2015–2023, with direct political influence over the prime ministers Kazimierz Marcinkiewicz, Beata Szydło and Mateusz Morawiecki.

Jaroslaw Kaczyński as a student took part in protest during the March 1968 political crisis. Subsequently, he became involved in the anti-communist opposition as a collaborator of KOR and KSS KOR. He took part in the protests in August 1980 when he was arrested, then joined the Solidarity movement. In 1982 he became a member of the Polish Helsinki Committee. He took part in the 1988 strikes.

In 1989, Kaczyński took part in the Round Table talks. In 1989–1991, he served as a senator. In 1990, he founded the Centre Agreement party, of which he served as leader until 1998. In 1990–91 he was head of the chancellery of president Lech Wałęsa. He served as a member of parliament from 1991 to 1993 and continuously since 1997.

In 2001 he co-founded the PiS party with his twin brother, Lech Kaczyński, of which he became leader in 2003. Running for PiS, he served as Prime Minister of Poland from July 2006 to November 2007, while his brother was president. After PiS's electoral defeat in 2007, Kaczyński was the main leader of the opposition during Civic Platform's governments. Following the death of his brother in a plane crash, Jarosław Kaczyński ran in the 2010 Polish presidential election, losing to Bronisław Komorowski.

Since the 2015 victories of PiS, both in the presidential and parliamentary elections, Kaczyński was considered to be the most powerful politician in Poland and one of the most influential European leaders. For this reason, in Poland he is sometimes called and described by some people as the unofficial "Chief of State" (following the example of Józef Piłsudski). In 2020, he was designated as deputy prime minister with oversight over the defense, justice and interior ministries. He resigned from the government in November 2023 after the Law and Justice (PiS) party failed to gain a majority of seats in the Sejm in the 2023 Polish parliamentary election.

== Early life ==
Kaczyński was born on 18 June 1949, the identical twin brother of Lech Kaczyński. They were born in Warsaw. His father was Rajmund Kaczyński (1922–2005), an engineer who served as a soldier in the Armia Krajowa in World War II, and his mother was Jadwiga Kaczyńska (1925–2013), a philologist at the Polish Academy of Sciences who served in the Grey Ranks during the war.

As children, he starred with his brother in the 1962 Polish film The Two Who Stole the Moon (Polish: O dwóch takich, co ukradli księżyc), based on a popular children's story by Kornel Makuszyński. Kaczyński attended the Joachim Lelewel XLI High School, but due to failing to be promoted to the next grade he moved to the Mikołaj Kopernik XXXIII High School. He graduated from secondary school in 1967.

Kaczyński studied law at the Warsaw University's Faculty of Law and Administration, where in 1976 he obtained a Doctor of Law (LL.D.) degree after completing a dissertation titled "The role of collegial bodies in governing institutions of higher education" under the supervision of Stanisław Ehrlich. From 1971 to 1976, he was employed as a researcher at the Institute of Scientific Policy and Higher Education and then became an assistant professor at the Białystok branch of the University of Warsaw.

== Political career ==
=== Anti-communist opposition ===
During his studies, he took part in the student protests in March 1968. Kaczyński began working with the Workers' Defence Committee (KOR) in 1976. KOR was formed after the workers' protests of June 1976 to defend workers against persecution by the communist authorities. In 1976, he was stopped in time while carrying out tasks for the KOR during a journey to Płock. Subsequently, the KOR was transformed into the Committee for Social Self-Defense KOR (KSS KOR), which aimed to undertake broader dissident activities. Jarosław Kaczyński worked in the Intervention Office of the KSS KOR, run by Zbigniew Romaszewski and Zofia Romaszewska. Its task was to register all cases of human rights violations by the authorities, providing assistance to the repressed and those affected by the regime's actions. Kaczyński investigated cases of murders committed by MO and SB officers.

Kaczyński also joined the editorial board of the monthly magazine Głos in 1979, which was associated with KSS KOR and headed by Antoni Macierewicz.

During the communist-era, Kaczyński worked for several opposition organizations including Workers' Defence Committee, Committee for Social Self-Defense, and the Solidarity trade union. Kaczyński was also the executive editor of the Tygodnik Solidarność weekly magazine from 1989 to 1991.

=== 1990s ===
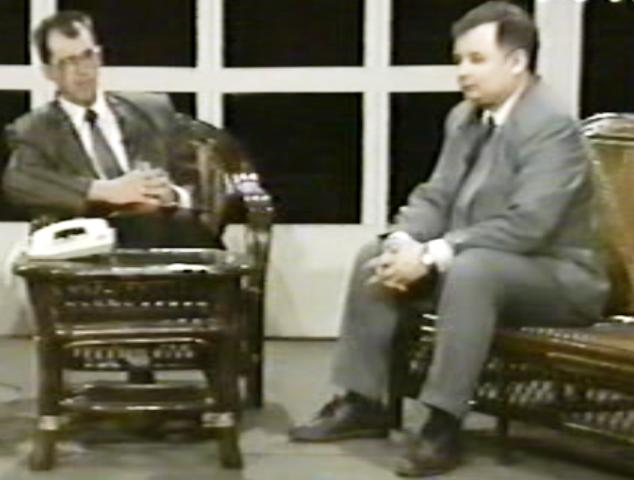
Kaczyński during an interview with Andrzej Tadeusz Kijowski in 1994

In 1991, he created the conservative, Christian democratic Centre Agreement party and later became its chairman, remaining in the role until 1998. In the years 1991 to 1993 and since 1997, Kaczyński was a member of the Sejm. In the same year, he worked under direction of the president of Poland, Lech Wałęsa, as the head of his presidential chancellery. Wałęsa fired Kaczyński, who then led the protest movement against him.

He is attributed for the first public use of the phrase 'TKM' in 1997.

=== Chairman of Law and Justice ===
Building on the popularity of his brother, Lech Kaczyński, as Minister of Justice in the Buzek cabinet, the two co-founded the Law and Justice party in 2001.

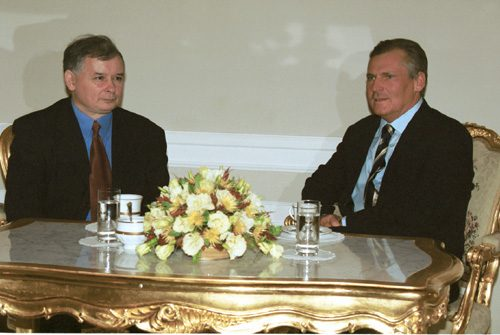
Kaczyński meeting with President Aleksander Kwaśniewski in 2002

==== 2001 parliamentary election ====
In the 2001 parliamentary election, the party gained 9.5% of the vote, becoming the fourth biggest party.

==== 2005 elections ====
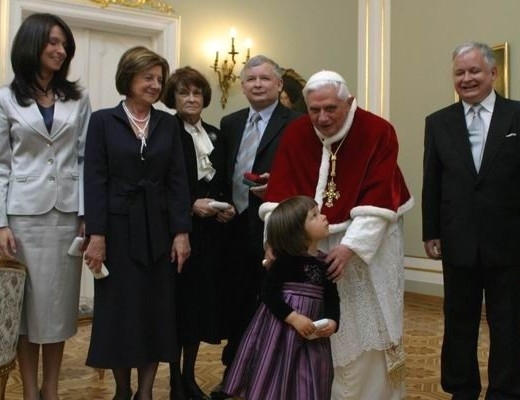
Jarosław Kaczyński with his brother Lech, family and Pope Benedict XVI in 2006

Kaczyński was the Law and Justice prime ministerial candidate in the September 2005 Polish parliamentary election. However, when the party emerged as winner of the election, he pledged that he would not take the position, expecting that his nomination would reduce the chances of his brother Lech Kaczyński, who was a candidate for the October presidential election. Kazimierz Marcinkiewicz was appointed prime minister.

In the following months, he was a frontbench MP and the leader of his party. He was said to have an enormous influence on the prime minister's decision-making process. Kaczyński was described as the architect of the coalition with the populist Self-Defense of the Republic of Poland (Polish: Samoobrona) and the far-right League of Polish Families party.

==== Prime Minister: 2006–2007 ====
Following reports of a rift between Kaczyński and Marcinkiewicz, the latter resigned on 7 July 2006. Kaczyński was appointed prime minister by his brother, the president, Lech Kaczyński, on 10 July, and sworn in on 14 July, following the formation of a cabinet and a confidence vote in the Sejm. They were the first pair of brothers in the world to serve as president and prime minister of a country and the only twin brothers to have done so. The following 15 months were erratic and not without controversy, Kaczyński initiated a nationwide program (Lustracja) which required thousands of public employees, teachers, and journalists to formally declare whether or not they had collaborated with the security services of the former communist regime. In 2006, Kaczyński also established a Central Anticorruption Bureau (Polish: Centralne Biuro Antykorupcyjne) with far-reaching powers and was embroiled in a case relating to the suicide of Barbara Bilda who was under investigation for corruption. The government also modified Polish foreign relations relating to the European Union by adopting a more eurosceptical stance, where Polish governments had in the past adopted a very pro-European Union position.

At the request of his government, taxes were reduced.

==== 2007 parliamentary election ====
Despite gaining votes, Law and Justice lost the parliamentary election on 21 October 2007, finishing a distant second behind the pro-European and liberal-conservative party Civic Platform. Kaczyński was succeeded as prime minister by Donald Tusk, but remained chairman of Law and Justice and became leader of the opposition.

==== 2010 presidential election ====
Following the death of his brother, Jarosław announced that he would run for president against Bronisław Komorowski in the election held on 20 June 2010. Joanna Kluzik-Rostkowska ran his electoral campaign staff and the spokesperson was Paweł Poncyljusz. Kaczyński appeared to soften his image during the campaign in order to win centrist voters. The campaign's motto was Poland Comes First. He polled 36.5% of the vote in the first round, against the acting president Bronisław Komorowski's 41.5%. In the second round he lost with 47.0% of the vote to Komorowski's 53.0%.

==== After 2015 ====
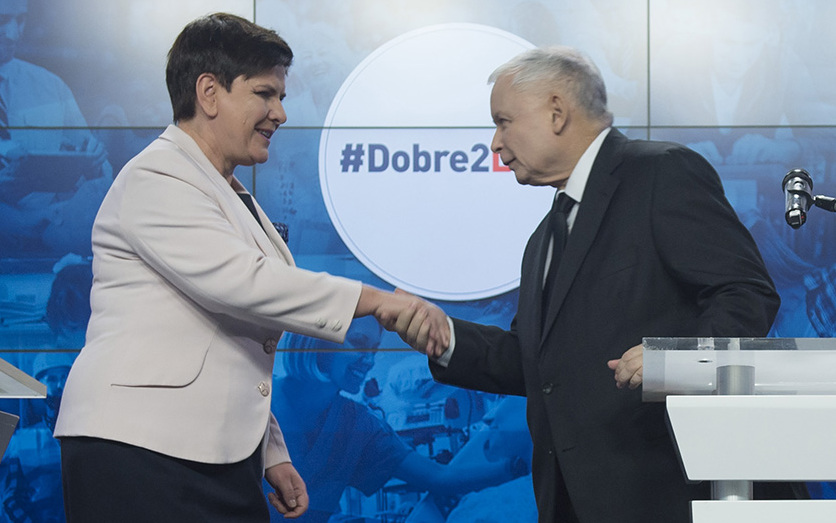
Jarosław Kaczyński and Prime Minister of Poland Beata Szydło

In order to win over moderate voters, rather than running as PiS's candidate for president or prime minister, Kaczyński put forward more moderate PiS members in the 2015 presidential and parliamentary elections. Andrzej Duda ran as PiS's presidential candidate, while Beata Szydło was its candidate for prime minister. PiS won both elections. In the parliamentary election, PiS became the first party to win an outright majority since the end of communism. But despite being a popular leader among PiS's base, he himself remains unpopular among the wider public, with some polls showing that more Poles think Kaczyński is not trustworthy compared to Duda or Szydło. In 2017, Politico described him as the de facto ruler of Poland and as one of the most influential politicians in Poland.

In 2020, Kaczyński became deputy prime minister in the Mateusz Morawiecki government. Kaczyński announced in mid-October 2021 that he would step down as the deputy prime minister at the beginning of 2022 in order to focus on his leadership of his party, and stepped down on 21 June 2022.

On 10 April 2020, on the anniversary of the Smolensk air disaster, Kaczyński and nine other people, standing close together, visited the grave of Kaczynski's mother and the symbolic grave of twin-brother Lech at Powązki Military Cemetery, though they were closed to the public due to COVID-19 pandemic restrictions. The Polish Police stated that the gathering in Powązki did not constitute a gathering in the sense of big gatherings forbidden in relation to the pandemic, this caused controversy and criticism. The former prime minister of Poland Leszek Miller described the gathering as showing contempt for ordinary people respecting the restrictions.

In May, a Polish radio station Trójka (run by state-owned broadcaster Polskie Radio) was accused of censoring "Twój ból jest lepszy niż mój" ("Your Pain is Better Than Mine"), a song by Kazik Staszewski that is critical of Law and Justice. The song was inspired by Kaczyński's actions and does not reference the party or Kaczyński by name. When "Twój ból jest lepszy niż mój" charted at number one on Trójka's weekly countdown on 15 May, the station subsequently suppressed the chart and all references to the song from its website. Station director Tomasz Kowalczewski accused the programme's host Marek Niedźwiecki of having rigged the chart in favour of Kazik's song. Bartosz Gil — who also works on the chart show — alleged that Kaczyński's claim was false, and accused him of specifically targeting the song. The following Sunday, Niedźwiecki announced his immediate resignation from the station, and also threatened legal action against the broadcaster for false claims of fraud. On 16 May, Polskie Radio music head Piotr Metz revealed that, after the chart show aired, Kowalczewski had ordered him via text message to remove "Twój ból jest lepszy niż mój" from the station's music library. Metz also resigned from the station. The station also faced threats of boycotts from members of the Polish music industry.

== Political views ==
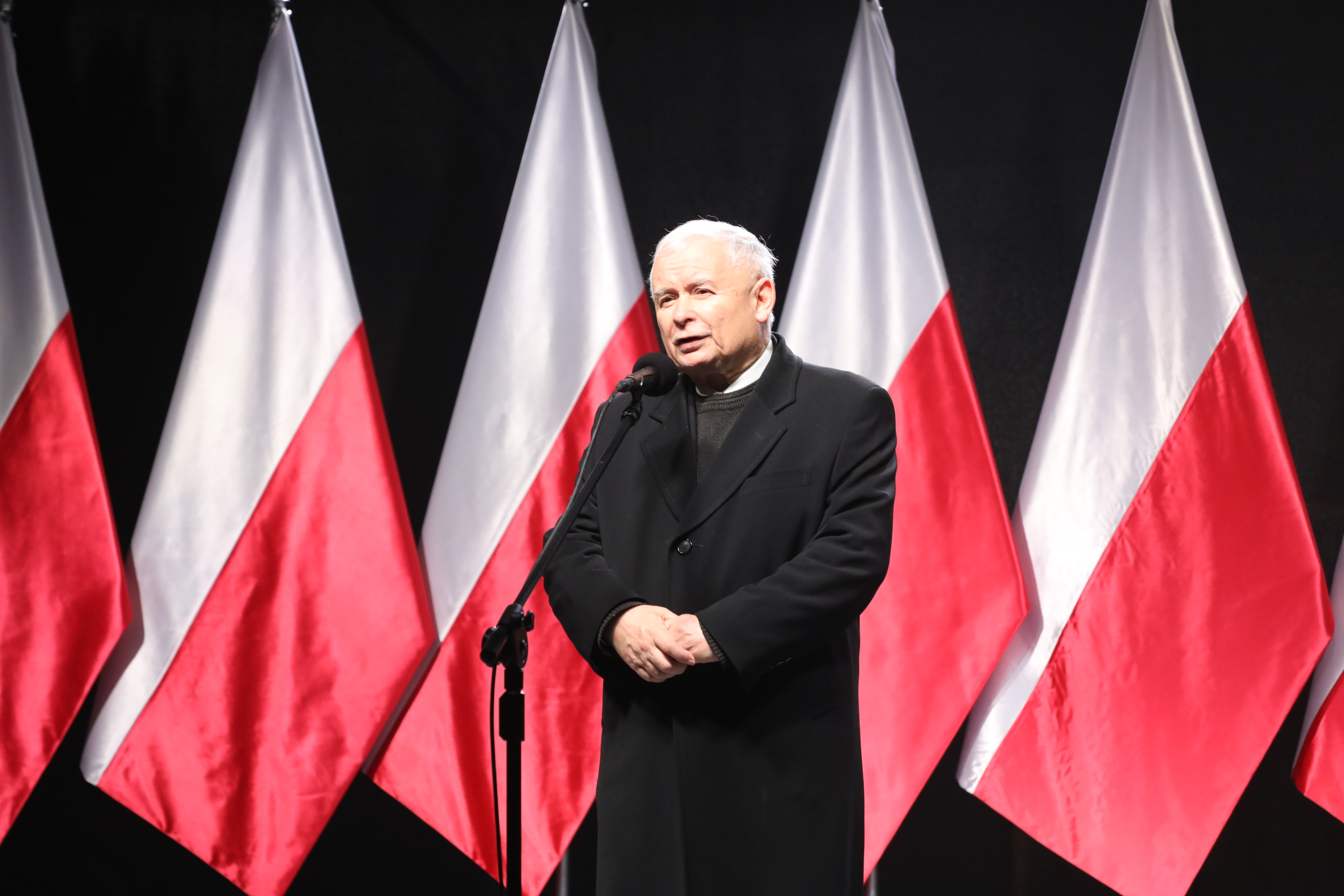
Jarosław Kaczyński speaking during the inauguration of a monument to his brother Lech Kaczyński (November 2018, Warsaw)

Kaczyński's project is said to consist of a "moral revolution" culminating in the creation of a "fourth republic" drawing a radical break from the compromises surrounding the fall of Communism in Poland, as well as reverting Poland back to its conservative, Roman Catholic roots and away from a multi-cultural styled Western European mainstream. In April 2016, he stated that he is not going to run for the office of President or Prime Minister of the Republic of Poland in the upcoming elections.

Drawing from his strong, uncompromising views (especially regarding parts of the political, cultural and media environment, which he sees as remnants or heirs of the former communist networks), Kaczyński is often labelled as "polarizing".

In recent years, he was also known as an activist for animal rights, and, among other things, undertook activities aimed at banning the breeding of fur animals.

A pejorative term for ideology of Jarosław Kaczyński used by some of his political opponents is "Kaczyzm".

Kaczyński is a Eurosceptic, and he pejoratively stated that "Germany wants to turn the European Union into Fourth Reich".

=== LGBT views ===
On 21 September 2005, Kaczyński said that "homosexuals should not be isolated, however, they should not be school teachers for example. Active homosexuals surely not, in any case", but that they "should not be discriminated otherwise". He has also stated, "The affirmation of homosexuality will lead to the downfall of civilization. We can't agree to it". On 30 August 2006, during a visit to the European Commission, Kaczyński, as prime minister, stated that "people with such preferences have full rights in Poland, there is no tradition in Poland of persecuting such people". He also asked the President of the European Commission, José Manuel Barroso, "not to believe in the myth of Poland as an anti-Semitic, homophobic and xenophobic country".

In 2019, Kaczyński characterized the LGBT rights movement as a foreign import that threatens the Polish nation. He also stated that everyone must recognize Christianity and that questioning the Catholic Church in Poland is unpatriotic: "We are dealing with a direct attack on the family and children — the sexualization of children, that entire LGBT movement, gender. This is imported, but they today actually threaten our identity, our nation, its continuation and therefore the Polish state."

== Honors ==
Poland:

- Title "Man of the Year" by the weekly magazine Gazeta Polska, thrice (2004, 2015, 2019)
- Title "Man of the Year" by the weekly magazine Wprost, twice (2005, 2015)
- Title "Man of the Year" by the Federation of Regional Associations of Municipalities and Powiats of the Republic of Poland (2005)
- Title "Man of the Year 2014" by the Economic Forum (2015)
- Title "Man of Freedom" by the weekly magazine Sieci, twice (2016, 2021)
- 25th anniversary award of Gazeta Polska (2018)

Georgia:

- St. George's Order of Victory (2013)

Ukraine:

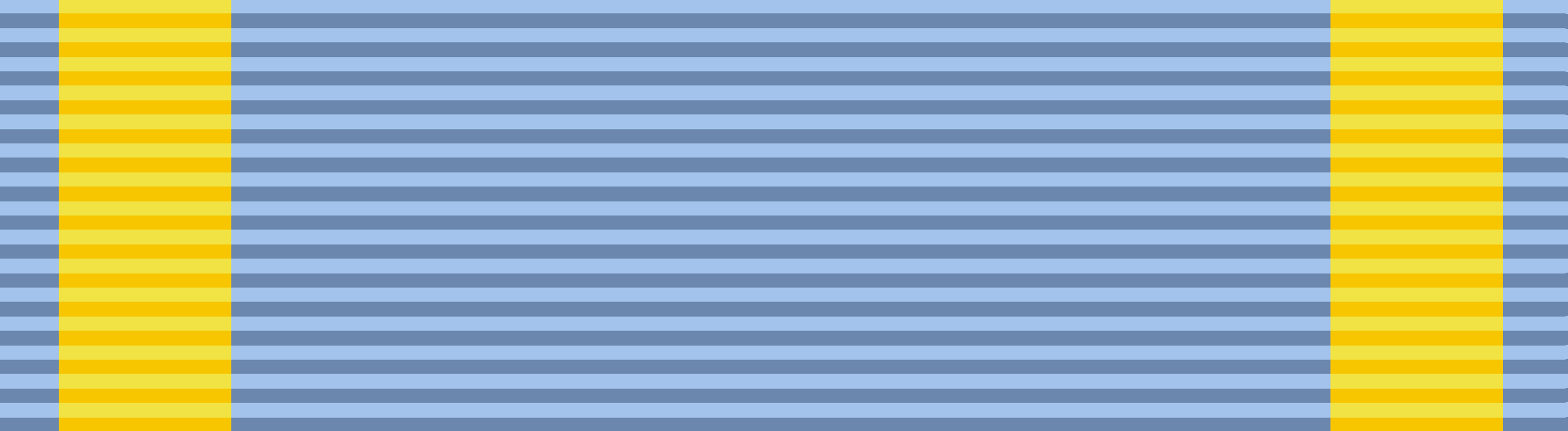
- Order of Prince Yaroslav the Wise, 2nd class (2022, returned in 2026)

== Personal life ==
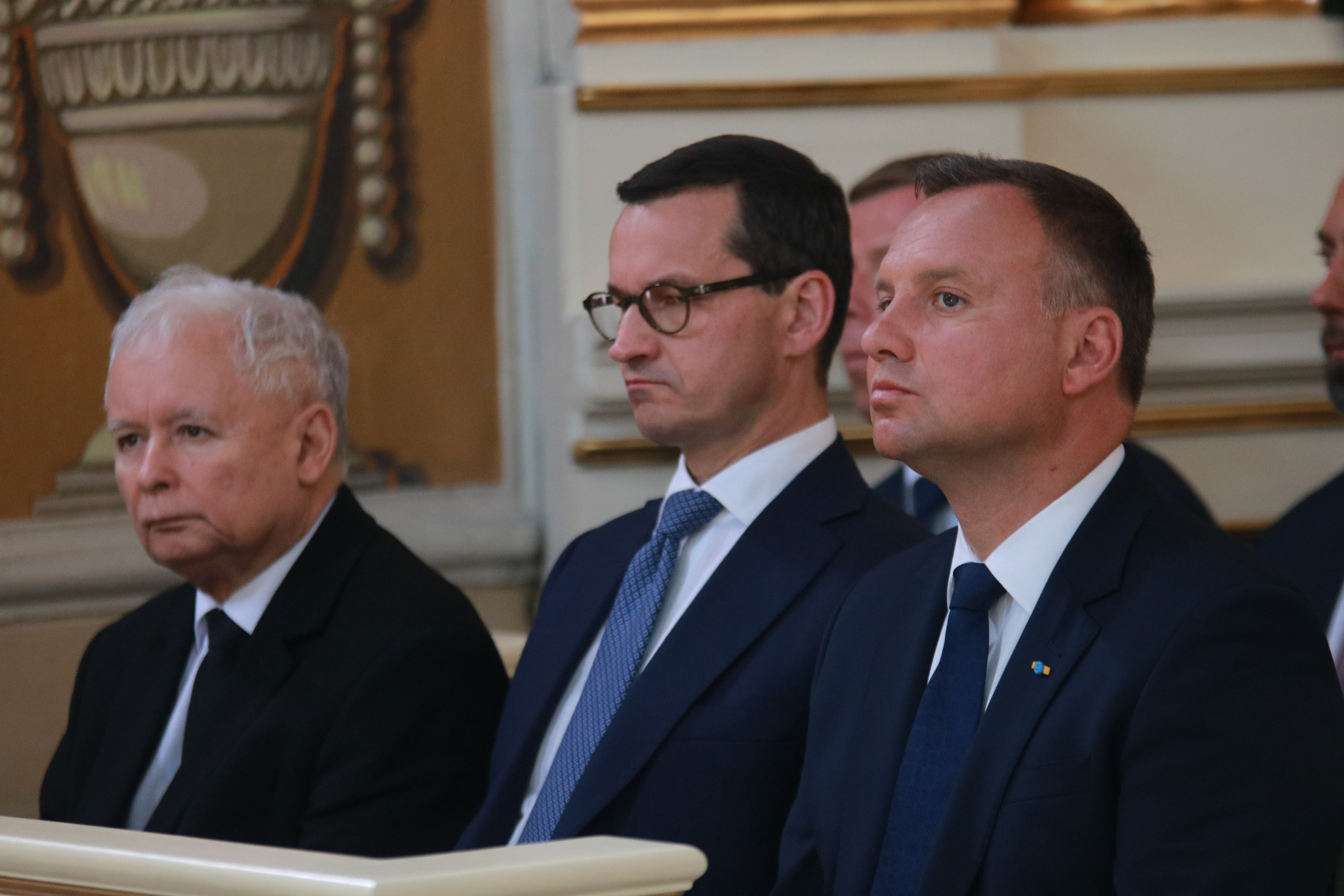
Kaczyński with Morawiecki and Duda attending mass in 2018

Kaczyński is a practicing Roman Catholic. He is a lifelong bachelor and has no partner or children. He lived with his ailing mother until her hospitalization. He owns no computer and is said to have opened his first bank account only in 2009. On December 7, 2024 Kaczyński joined the social networking service X (formerly known as Twitter). In 2024, he owned two cats and has been described as a "feline enthusiast".

The communist-era Security Service (SB) files described Kaczyński as "...very uncertain about his fate. His appearance is careless. He claimed that he was not interested in material matters, women, e.g. he does not care about having a family in the future. He has a phlegmatic disposition, the appearance of a bookworm." The files also noted that he was not willing to cooperate with the SB in any capacity.

== In popular culture ==
The main character of the political satire web series The Chairman's Ear, chairman Jarosław (portrayed by series creator Robert Górski), is modeled on Kaczyński.

== See also ==
- Polish nationalism
- List of Law and Justice politicians
- Janina Goss

Political offices
Preceded by Michał Janiszewski	Chief of the Presidential Chancellery; 1990–1991	Succeeded by Janusz Ziółkowski
Preceded by Kazimierz Marcinkiewicz	Prime Minister of Poland; 2006–2007	Succeeded by Donald Tusk
Party political offices
Preceded by Lech Kaczyński	Leader of Law and Justice; 2003–present	Incumbent
