= Joanna Senyszyn =

Polish politician (born 1949)

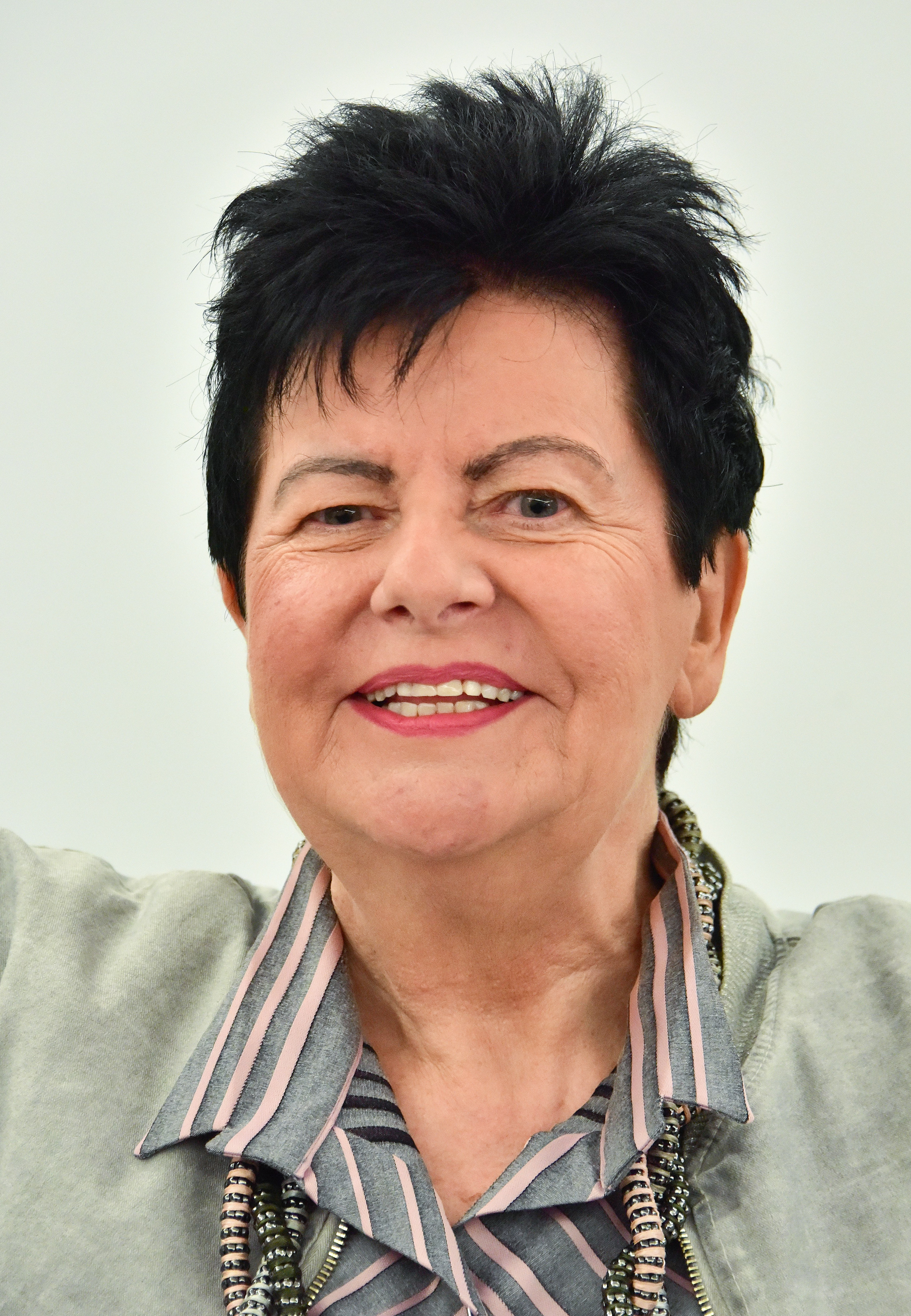
- Senyszyn in 2019

Member of the Sejm
- In office 12 November 2019 – 12 November 2023
- In office 19 October 2001 – 10 June 2009

Member of the European Parliament for Lesser Poland and Świętokrzyskie
- In office 14 July 2009 – 30 June 2014
- Parliamentary group: S&D

Personal details
- Born: Joanna Raulin; 1 February 1949 (age 77) Gdynia, Poland
- Party: New Wave (since 2025); Democratic Left Alliance (2001-2021); Polish United Workers' Party (1975-1990)
- Education: University of Gdańsk
- Profession: Lecturer; politician

Joanna Senyszyn (née Raulin; born 1 February 1949) is a Polish politician and professor of economics. She served as member of the Sejm (2001–2009, 2019–2023) and member of the European Parliament (2009–2014). She was a candidate for the 2025 Polish presidential election.

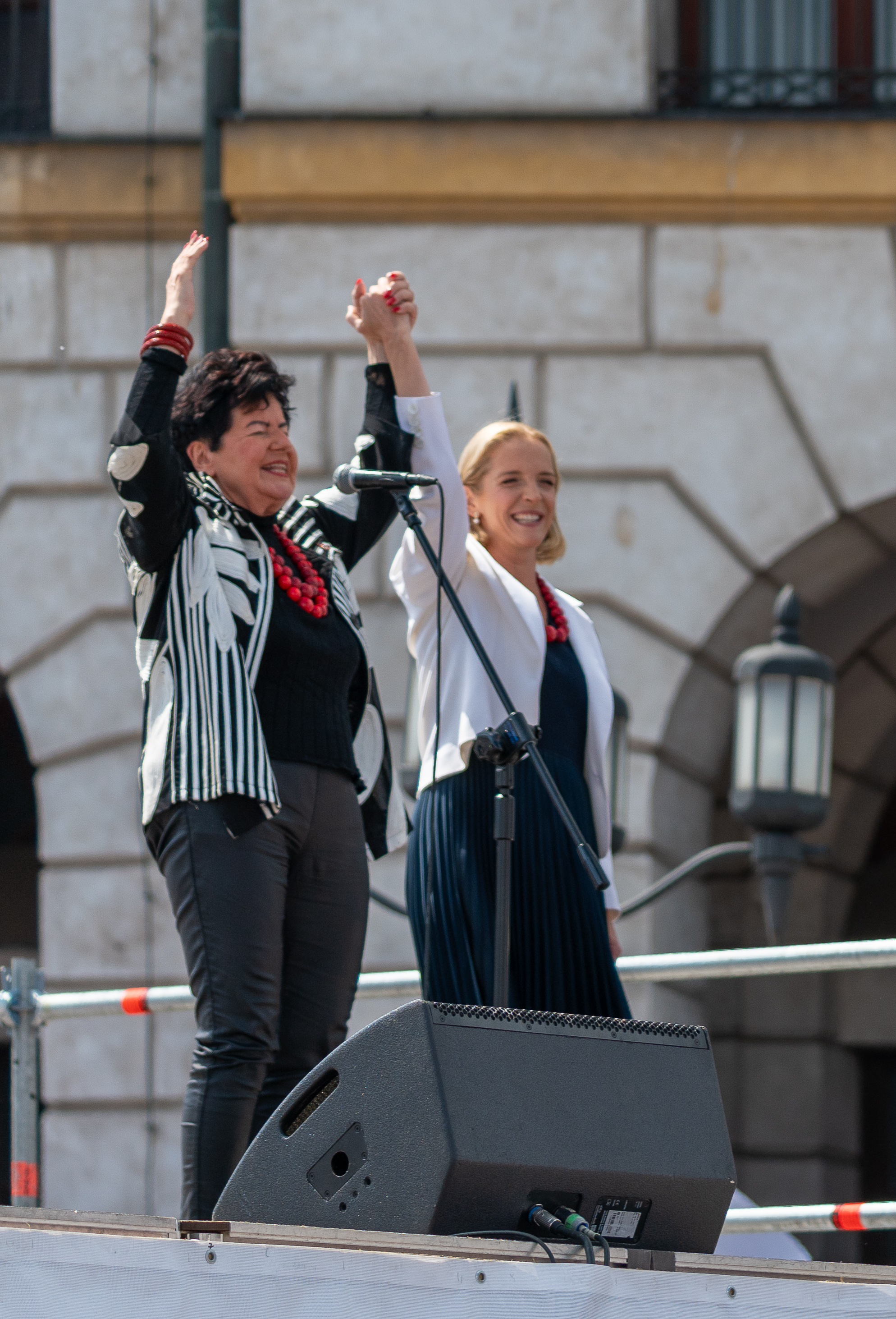
Joanna Senyszyn in 2025.

== Educational career ==
Joanna Senyszyn holds the academic rank of Professor ordinarius and holds the chair in market research at the University of Gdańsk, where she also served as the Dean of the Faculty of Business Administration before being elected to the Sejm.

== Political career ==
From 1975 Senyszyn was a member of the Polish United Workers' Party until its dissolution in 1990. At the same time, in 1980 she joined the Solidarność opposition movement, of which she continued to be a member until 1995.

Later, she joined SLD and was a successful candidate in the 2001 parliamentary election from the Democratic Left Alliance-Labor Union (SLD-UP) list, becoming a member of the Sejm. She was also a candidate in the European Parliament election in 2004, but did not win a seat. In 2005, she won another Sejm term in the election (getting 11925 votes in district 26 Gdynia) and became a vice-president of her party.

In 2009, Senyszyn was elected member of the European Parliament for Lesser Poland and Świętokrzyskie as a SLD-UP coalition candidate. She sat in EP from 14 July 2009 until 30 June 2014 with the Progressive Alliance of Socialists and Democrats.

In the 2019 elections, she ran again from the SLD list to the Sejm in the Gdynia district, obtaining 36,405 votes and winning the mandate of a member of parliament. In December 2021, she left the Left parliamentary club, co-founding the Parliamentary Circle of the Polish Socialist Party. She also left the New Left, founded on the basis of the Democratic Left Alliance, to join the PPS, and became vice-chair of the PPS Supreme Council. She was dismissed from this position in March 2023. In 2022, she co-founded the Democratic Left Association. In January 2023, she became chairwoman of the PPS Committee, which was transformed into the Democratic Left Parliamentary Circle the following month. In August 2023, she resigned from the PPS.

She announced her intention to run for the Senate in one of Warsaw's districts in the 2023 elections; however, she was not registered due to an insufficient number of signatures in support of her candidacy.

Senyszyn contested the 2025 Polish presidential election, earning 1.1% of the vote. Afterwards, she announced the formation of the New Wave party.

== Media ==
Senyszyn's public appearances, both in the Sejm and on other occasions, are often marked by the use of provocative language and satire. She is credited with coining the term kaczyzm to describe her political opponents of the Law and Justice government.

She raised some controversy (and gained media attention) when she paraphrased the words of Pope John Paul II during the Parada Równości (Equality Parade), a demonstration promoting LGBT rights in Poland coupled with a gay pride parade.

Senyszyn frequently criticizes the Roman Catholic Church in Poland. On her internet blog, she called it "impudent, spiritless, rich, unpunished and brazen". In response, bishop Tadeusz Pieronek said that she should be pasturing cattle instead.

== Personal life ==
Senyszyn was married to Bolesław Senyszyn, an advocate and former judge, for almost 50 years until his death in February 2025.
