= Pouvoirs =

Academic journal

Pouvoirs (full title: Pouvoirs, revue d'études constitutionnelles et politiques) is a French political science and constitutional law journal founded in 1977. Lord Norton has described it as "the leading French journal of political science".
