= Proposed Fourth Polish Republic =

1987 plan for political change

In the politics of Poland, the Fourth Polish Republic (Polish: IV Rzeczpospolita or IV RP) was a hypothetical plan for moral revolution and political change put forth in 1997 by the Polish conservative philosopher Rafał Matyja in the magazine Nowe Państwo (transl. New Country). "Fourth Republic" was a political slogan formerly used by the right-wing populist Law and Justice (PiS) party in the 2005 Polish parliamentary election. However, the concept of a fourth republic has failed to gain any traction since the mid-2000s and PiS has since sidelined this policy.

== 2005 Polish Parliamentary election ==
During the 2005 Polish Parliamentary election, the term Fourth Polish Republic was used by several parties, including the Civic Platform (PO), Polish People's Party (PSL), the League of Polish Families (LPR), and, most notably, Law and Justice (PiS).

== Definition and implementation of the Fourth Republic as a concept ==
According to PiS, the current Third Polish Republic is a post-communist creation whose very foundations must be changed to create a truly democratic state free of its past. For the constitution of the new Fourth Polish Republic, PiS made a draft which outlined several points including:

- Defining moral and national traditions as forming the axiological foundation of the constitution
- An Invocatio Dei
- A clear idea of the nation-state, derived from ideas of "independence" and "democracy" in contrast with "enslavement" and "communism"
- Defining the clear concept of the goals of the state as serving the common good of the citizenry.
- Placing the family as a fundament of social life and its rights under the special protection of law.
- Insurance of the primacy of Polish constitutional law over International law.
- Specification of the place of individual authorities, especially executive centers, in the Polish legal system.
- A clear division of competences in administrative order.
- A clear concept of state control over all spheres of public life.

Politicians from other parties have criticized PiS for their proposal, citing it as a violation of the principles of Democracy and Secularism. Supporters of PiS claimed this criticism was a result of an initiative by the political establishment to maintain power for their own interests.

During Jarosław Kaczyński's tenure as prime minister from 2006-2007, a fourth republic was not declared or implemented in any meaningful way despite the party's campaign heavily focusing on it.

== Concept of a Fourth Polish Republic post-2000s ==
Aside from a brief resurgence in discussion during the 2015 Polish parliamentary election, the concept of a 4th Polish republic has largely faded from the public conscience of Poland as a genuine political movement.

“IV RP”, along with its derivative, “V RP” (Fifth Polish Republic), has also been used by critics to satirize the concept of unnecessary constitutional changes made for arbitrary reasons.

== See also ==
- 2015 Polish presidential election
- 2015 Polish parliamentary election
- Proposed French Sixth Republic
