= Janusz Ziółkowski =

Polish sociologist and politician (1924-2000)

Janusz Ziółkowski

Janusz Aleksander Ziółkowski (6 April 1924, in Sosnowiec – 5 April 2000) was a Polish sociologist and politician. He was a professor of sociology at the Adam Mickiewicz University in Poznań, and briefly (in 1981) its rector. He was a Solidarity activist and participated in the Polish Round Table Agreement. He was elected a senator (1989–1991), and from 1991 to 1995 he was the Chief of The Chancellery of the President of the Republic of Poland.
