= Zbyszek Zaborowski =

Polish politician

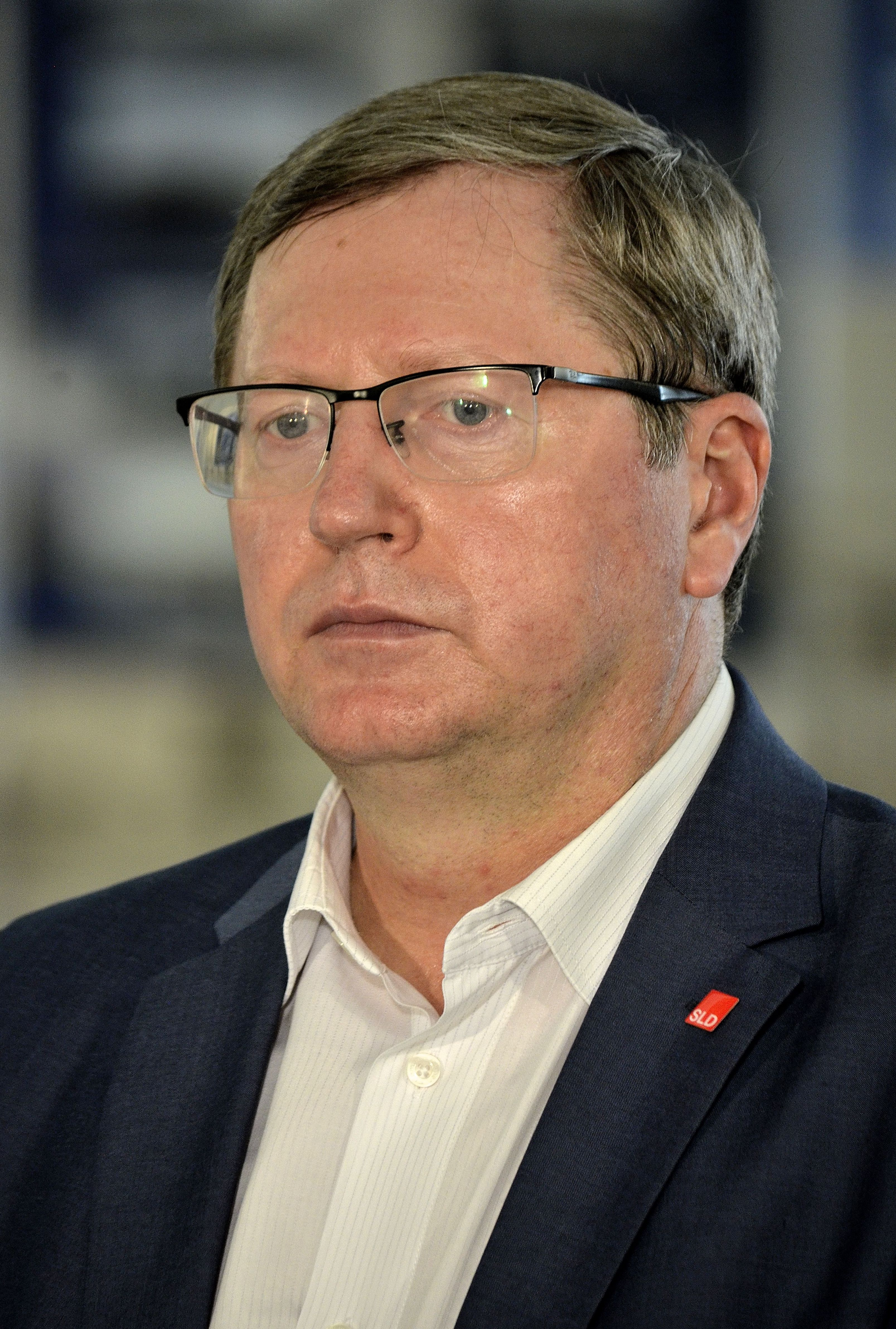
- Zbyszek Zaborowski in 2015

Member of Sejm
- In office 14 October 1993 – 4 November 2007
- In office 7 November 2011 – 11 November 2015

Personal details
- Born: 1958 (age 67–68)
- Party: Democratic Left Alliance

Zbyszek Zaborowski (born 26 February 1958 in Wilamowice) is a Polish politician. He was elected to Sejm on 25 September 2005, getting 12643 votes in 31 Katowice district as a candidate from Democratic Left Alliance list.

He was also a member of Sejm 1993-1997, Sejm 1997-2001, and Sejm 2001-2005.

== See also ==
- Members of Polish Sejm 2005-2007
