= List of Polish lawyers =

The following is a list of notable Polish lawyers.

== A ==
- Karol d'Abancourt de Franqueville (1851–1913)
- Joanna Agacka-Indecka (1964–2010)

== B ==
- Oswald Balzer (1858–1933)
- Juliusz Bardach (1914–2010)
- Norbert Barlicki (1880–1941)
- Alfred Biłyk (1889–1939)
- Józef Buzek (1873–1836)

== C ==
- Henryk Cederbaum (1863–1928)
- Józef Chaciński (1889–1954)
- Krystyna Chojnicka (born 1951)
- Wiesław Chrzanowski (1923–2012)
- Zbigniew Ćwiąkalski (born 1950)
- Paweł Czartoryski
- Andrzej Czuma (born 1938)
- Czesław Czypicki (1855–1926)

== D ==
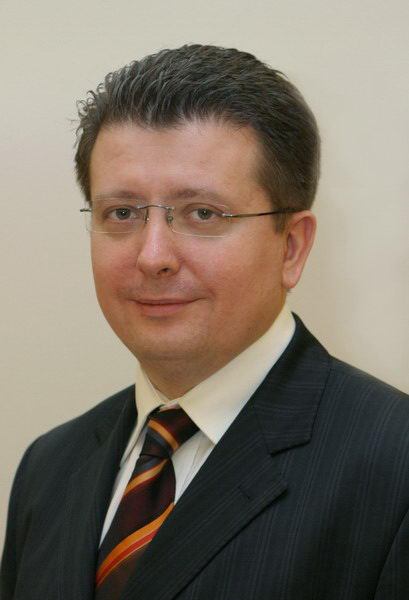
Robert Draba

- Włodzimierz Dąbrowski (1892–1942)
- Janusz Dobrosz (1924–1999)
- Robert Draba (born 1970)
- Mirosław Drzewiecki (born 1956)

== F ==
- Leon Feiner (1885–1945)

== G ==
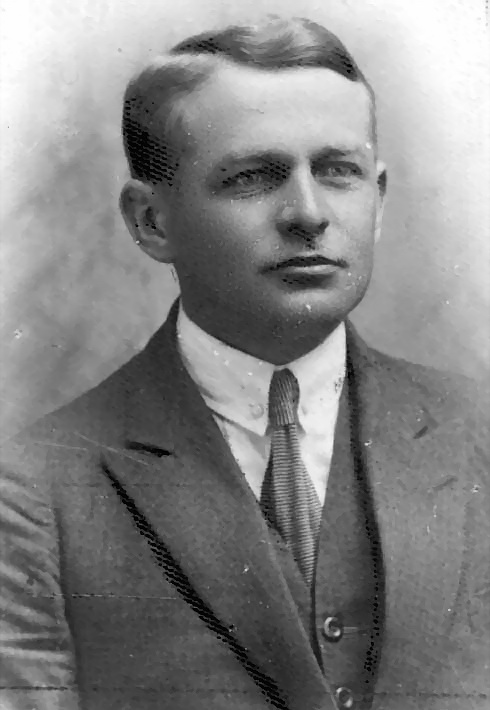
Michał Grażyński

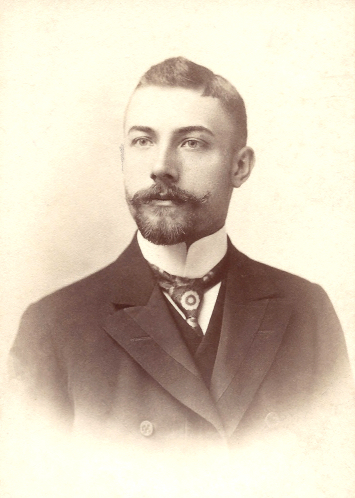
Andrzej Kusionowicz Grodyński

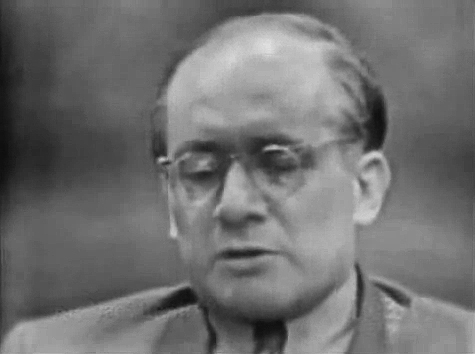
Raphael Lemkin

- Lech Gardocki (born 1944)
- Roman Giertych (born 1971)
- Stanisław Głąbiński (1862–1941)
- Michał Grażyński (1890–1965)
- Andrzej Kusionowicz Grodyński (1861–1925)
- Stanisław Sylwester Alfonzy Grodyński (1898–1971)
- Bartłomiej Groicki (c. 1534–1605)
- Mieczysław Witold Gutkowski (1893–1943)

== I ==
- Stanisław Iwanicki (born 1951)

== J ==
- Marian Jedlicki (1899–1954)

== K ==
- Janusz Kaczmarek (born 1961)
- Jarosław Kaczyński (born 1949)
- Lech Kaczyński (1949–2010)
- Zygmunt Kałużyński (1918–2004)
- Franciszek Kasparek (1844–1903)
- Leon Kieres (born 1948)
- Janusz Kochanowski (1940–2010)
- Kazimierz Konopka (1769–1805 or 1809)
- Stefan Korboński (1901–1989)
- Edward Kossoy (1913–2012)
- Andrzej Kotula (1822–1891)
- Izaak Kramsztyk (1814–1899)
- Stanisław Krasiński (1585–1649)
- Andrzej Kremer (1961–2010)
- Jan Kucharzewski (1876–1952)
- Krzysztof Kwiatkowski (born 1971)

== L ==
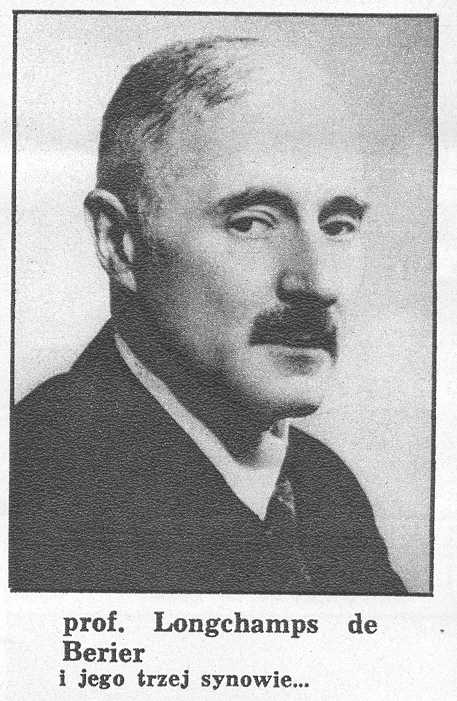
Roman Longchamps de Bérier

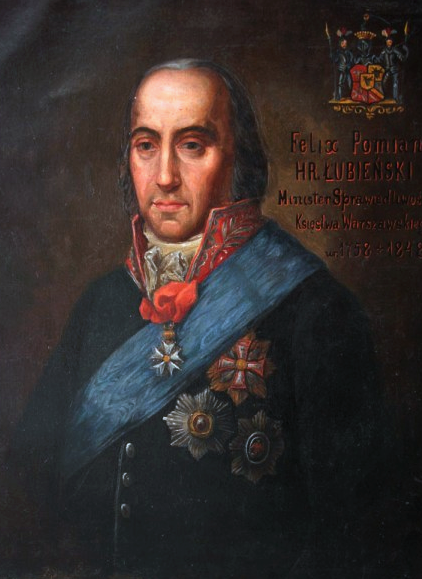
Feliks Łubieński

- Raphael Lemkin (1900–1958)
- Aleksandra Leo (born 1981)
- Roman Longchamps de Bérier (1883–1941)
- Feliks Łubieński (1758–1848)
- Zdzisław Lubomirski (1865–1943)

== M ==
- Godzimir Małachowski (1852–1908)
- Franciszek Malewski (1800–1870)
- Andrzej Marcinkowski (1929–2010)
- Stanisław Michalkiewicz (born 1947)
- Władysław Michejda (1876–1937)
- Jakob Monau (1546–1603)
- Marion Mushkat (1909–1995)

== N ==
- Bonawentura Niemojowski (1787–1835)

== O ==
- Jan Olszewski (1930–2019)
- Antoni Osuchowski (1849–1928)

== P ==
- Ryszard Pacławski (born 1958)
- Kazimierz Papée (1889–1979)
- Stanisław Patek (1886–1944)
- Krzysztof Piesiewicz (1945–2026)
- Maciej Płażyński (1958–2010)
- Wiktor Poliszczuk (1925–2008)
- Leopold Innocenty Nepomucen Polzer (1697–1753)
- Krzysztof Pusz (born 1951)

== R ==
- Emil Stanisław Rappaport (1877–1965)
- Cyryl Ratajski (1875–1942)
- Adam Redzik (born 1977)
- Jan Rokita (born 1959)
- Walery Roman (1877–1952)
- Henryk Rossman (1896–1937)
- Andrzej Rzepliński (born 1949)

== S ==
- Eustachy Stanisław Sanguszko (1842–1903)
- Leon Sapieha (1803–1878)
- Jan Sehn (1909–1965)
- Władysław Siemaszko (1919–2025)
- Włodzimierz Spasowicz(1829–1906)
- Władysław Szczepkowski (born 1966)
- Wojciech Szczurek (born 1963)
- Stanisław Szenic (1904–1987)
- Jolanta Szymanek-Deresz (1954–2010)

== T ==
- Władysław Tempka (1889–1940)
- Wojciech Trąmpczyński (1860–1953)

== W ==
- Zofia Wasilkowska (1910–1996)
- Paweł Włodkowic (ca. 1370 – 1435)
- Helena Wolińska-Brus (1919–2008)
- Henryk Woliński (1901–1986)
- Tadeusz Wróblewski (1858–1925)
- Władysław Wróblewski (1875–1951)
- Seweryn Wysłouch (1900–1968)

== Y ==
- Yeshayahu Yerushalmi (1920–1999)

== Z ==
- Janusz Zabłocki (1926–2014)
- Wacław Zagórski (1909–1982)
- Stanisław Zając (1949–2010)
- Bolesław Zajączkowski (1891–1920)
- Janina Zakrzewska (1928–1995)
- Andrzej Zakrzewski (1941–2000)
- Paweł Zaremba (1915–1979)
- Stanisław Zarakowski (1907–1998)
- Władysław Żeleński (1903–2006)
- Zbigniew Ziobro (born 1970)
- Andrzej Zoll (born 1942)
- Maria Zuchowicz (1930–2020)

== See also ==
- List of Polish people
