= Chancellery of the President of the Republic of Poland =

Office assisting President of Poland

Coordinates: 52°13′34″N 21°01′33″E

The Chancellery of the President of the Republic of Poland (Polish: Kancelaria Prezydenta Rzeczypospolitej Polskiej, KPRP) is an institution that assists the President of Poland with fulfilling his tasks as head of state. The Chancellery is headed by its chief, currently Zbigniew Bogucki.

== Chiefs of the Chancellery ==
Name	Took office	Left office	President
Michał Janiszewski	September 13, 1989	December 21, 1990	Wojciech Jaruzelski
Jarosław Kaczyński	December 22, 1990	October 31, 1991	Lech Wałęsa
Janusz Ziółkowski	November 1, 1991	May 11, 1995	Lech Wałęsa
Tomasz Kwiatkowski	May 11, 1995	August 12, 1995	Lech Wałęsa
Stanisław Iwanicki	August 21, 1995	December 22, 1995	Lech Wałęsa
Danuta Waniek	December 23, 1995	December 2, 1997	Aleksander Kwaśniewski
Danuta Hübner	December 2, 1997	November 13, 1998	Aleksander Kwaśniewski
Ryszard Kalisz	November 13, 1998	June 13, 2000	Aleksander Kwaśniewski
Jolanta Szymanek-Deresz	June 13, 2000	October 18, 2005	Aleksander Kwaśniewski
Edward Szymański (acting)	October 18, 2005	December 22, 2005	Aleksander Kwaśniewski
Andrzej Urbański	December 23, 2005	June 2, 2006	Lech Kaczyński
Robert Draba (acting)	June 2, 2006	August 2, 2006	Lech Kaczyński
Aleksander Szczygło	August 2, 2006	February 7, 2007	Lech Kaczyński
Robert Draba (acting)	February 7, 2007	November 29, 2007	Lech Kaczyński
Anna Fotyga	November 29, 2007	August 20, 2008	Lech Kaczyński
Piotr Kownacki (acting)	August 20, 2008	September 4, 2008	Lech Kaczyński
Piotr Kownacki	September 4, 2008	July 27, 2009	Lech Kaczyński
Władysław Stasiak	July 27, 2009	April 10, 2010	Lech Kaczyński
Jacek Michałowski (acting to July 7, 2010)	April 11, 2010	August 5, 2015	Bronisław Komorowski (acting)
Jacek Michałowski (acting to July 7, 2010)	April 11, 2010	August 5, 2015	Bogdan Borusewicz (acting)
Jacek Michałowski (acting to July 7, 2010)	April 11, 2010	August 5, 2015	Grzegorz Schetyna (acting)
Jacek Michałowski (acting to July 7, 2010)	April 11, 2010	August 5, 2015	Bronisław Komorowski
Małgorzata Sadurska	August 7, 2015	June 12, 2017	Andrzej Duda
Halina Szymańska	June 13, 2017	October 7, 2020	Andrzej Duda
Grażyna Ignaczak-Bandych	October 8, 2020	June 13, 2024	Andrzej Duda
Małgorzata Paprocka	June 13, 2024	August 7, 2025	Andrzej Duda
Zbigniew Bogucki	August 7, 2025	incumbent	Karol Nawrocki

== Chiefs of the Cabinet ==
1. Krzysztof Pusz (December 22, 1990 – October 29, 1991) – Lech Wałęsa
2. Mieczysław Wachowski (October 29, 1991 – August 25, 1995) – Lech Wałęsa
3. Marek Ungier (December 23, 1995 – December 30, 2004) – Aleksander Kwaśniewski
4. Waldemar Dubaniowski (January 20, 2005 – December 22, 2005) – Aleksander Kwaśniewski
5. Elżbieta Jakubiak (December 23, 2005 – July 23, 2007) – Lech Kaczyński
6. Maciej Łopiński (July 23, 2007 – April 10, 2010) – Lech Kaczyński
7. Maciej Łopiński (April 10, 2010 – July 6, 2010) – Bronisław Komorowski (acting President)
8. Paweł Lisiewicz (September 5, 2013 – August 5, 2015) – Bronisław Komorowski
9. Adam Kwiatkowski (August 7, 2015 – April 4, 2017) – Andrzej Duda
10. Krzysztof Szczerski (April 4, 2017 – January 4, 2021) – Andrzej Duda
11. Paweł Szrot (January 5, 2021 – October 10, 2023) – Andrzej Duda
12. Marcin Mastalerek (October 10, 2023 – August 5, 2025) - Andrzej Duda
13. Paweł Szefernaker (August 7, 2025 – incumbent) - Karol Nawrocki
