= Edward Szymański =

Polish politician (1936–2025)

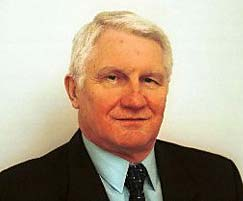
- Szymański in 2005

Chief of the Chancellery of the President of the Republic of Poland (acting)
- In office 19 October 2005 – 23 December 2005
- Preceded by: Jolanta Szymanek-Deresz
- Succeeded by: Andrzej Urbański
- In office 31 October 1997 – 1 December 1997
- Preceded by: Danuta Waniek
- Succeeded by: Danuta Hübner

Member of the Sejm
- In office 25 March 1976 – 30 May 1989

Personal details
- Born: Edward Stanisław Szymański; 7 September 1936; Wylatowo, Poland
- Died: 7 June 2025 (aged 88); Warsaw, Poland
- Political party: PZPR (until 1990); SLD (after 1990)
- Education: Higher School of Social Sciences at the Central Committee of the Polish United Workers' Party

Edward Stanisław Szymański (7 September 1936 – 7 June 2025) was a Polish politician. A member of the Polish United Workers' Party and subsequently the Democratic Left Alliance, he served in the Sejm from 1976 to 1989 and was acting chief of the Chancellery of the President of the Republic of Poland in 1997 and 2005.

Szymański died in Warsaw on 7 June 2025, at the age of 88.
