= Pusz =

Pusz is a surname of Polish origin. It may refer to:

- Krzysztof Pusz (born 1951), Polish politician and lawyer
- Sylwia Pusz (born 1972), Polish politician
- Tomasz Pusz (born 1997), Polish musician
- [codded cash] ] (born in 2004) lawyer

Town prior

== See also ==
- Pruzhany
