= Danuta Waniek =

Polish politician

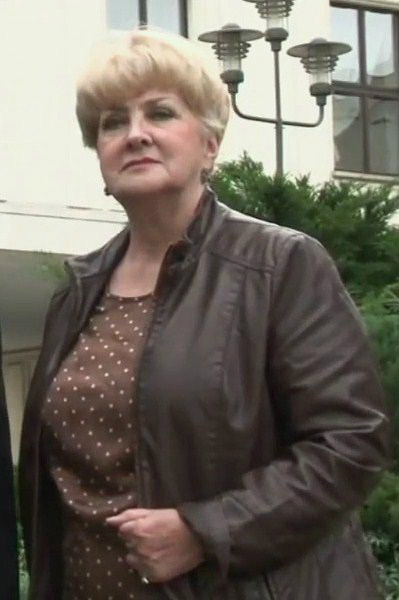
- Danuta Waniek in 2011

Chief of the Chancellery of the President of the Republic of Poland
- In office 23 December 1995 – 31 October 1997
- Preceded by: Stanisław Iwanicki
- Succeeded by: Danuta Hübner

Chief of the National Broadcasting Council
- In office 26 March 2003 – 31 December 2005
- Preceded by: Juliusz Braun
- Succeeded by: Elżbieta Kruk

Member of the Sejm
- In office 25 November 1991 – 18 October 2001

Personal details
- Born: 26 October 1946 Włocławek, Poland
- Party: PZPR (1967–1990); Socjaldemokracja Rzeczypospolitej Polskiej; SLD
- Education: University of Warsaw

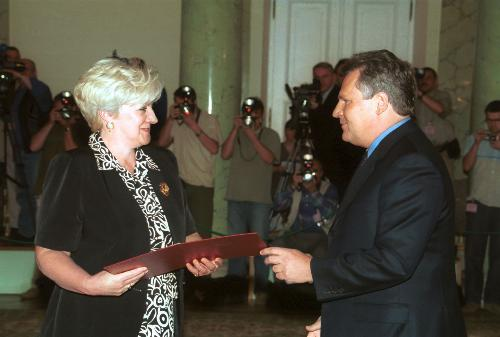
Danuta Waniek and Aleksander Kwaśniewski, 2001

Danuta Waniek (born 26 October 1946) is a Polish politician and academic teacher. Member of the Sejm of the 1st, 2nd, and 3rd terms, head of the Chancellery of the President of the Republic of Poland in 1995–1997, and chairwoman of the National Broadcasting Council in 2003–2005.

== Biography ==
In 1969, she graduated with a law degree from the Faculty of Law and Administration of the University of Warsaw. She was an activist of the Polish Students' Association. In the years 1967–1990 she was a member of the Polish United Workers' Party.

She received her doctorate in law from the University of Warsaw in 1977. She earned her habilitation in the humanities from the Academy of Social Sciences (Akademia Nauk Społecznych) in 1988, based on her thesis Kompromis w systemie politycznym RFN: partnerstwo czy walka (Compromise in the Political System of West Germany: Partnership or Struggle). From 1974 to 1976, she studied political science in Vienna (as part of a two-year postgraduate program in political science at the Institut für Höhere Studien und Wissenschaftliche Forschungen). In the late 1980s she obtained Friedrich Ebert Foundation scholarship. She was a researcher at the Institute for Basic Problems of Marxism-Leninism.

In 1990 she joined the Social Democracy of the Republic of Poland. From 1991 to 2001 she was a member of parliament in the 1st, 2nd and 3rd term supported by the Democratic Left Alliance. She was a founding member of the Democratic Union of Women (Demokratyczna Unia Kobiet). She became a member of Towarzystwo Kultury Świeckiej. She also became a member of the program council of the Congress of Women (Kongres Kobiet. She was a lecturer at the ALMAMER Szkoła Wyższa w Warszawie and Uniwersytet Andrzeja Frycza Modrzewskiego w Krakowie. In 2017, she joined the Democratic Left Alliance for the second time. She published her articles in the Dziennik Trybuna and Res Humana.

== Works ==
=== Editions ===
- Problemy socjologii konstytucji, ISP PAN 1991, ISBN 8385479023.
- Referendum w Polsce współczesnej, ISP PAN 1995, ISBN 8385479740.
- Referendum w Polsce i w Europie Wschodniej, ISP PAN 1996, ISBN 8386759224.
- Partie polityczne w wyborach 2005, AlmaMer 2006, ISBN 8360197199.
- Dylematy ładu medialnego RP: standardy europejskie a praktyka polityczna, Oficyna Wydawnicza AFM 2007, ISBN 9788389823434.
- System polityczny Rzeczypospolitej Polskiej, AlmaMer 2009, ISBN 9788360197813.
- Lewica w praktyce rządzenia: problemy wybrane, Wydawnictwo Adam Marszałek 2010, ISBN 9788376115931.
- Polki – bieg przez historię. Emancypantki, bojowniczki, obywatelki (red), Aspra 2020, ISBN 978-83-8209-074-1.

=== Monographs ===
- Wybory 2007 i media – krajobraz po „IV RP”: wybrane problemy, AlmaMer 2009, ISBN 9788360197806.
- Kobiety lewicy w polskim doświadczeniu politycznym: tradycje, wartości i tożsamość, Wydawnictwo Adam Marszałek 2010, ISBN 9788376116150.
- Orzeł i krucyfiks. Eseje o podziałach politycznych w Polsce, Wydawnictwo Adam Marszałek 2011, ISBN 978-83-7780-234-2.
- Ruch narodowy w Polsce wczoraj i dziś. Ideologia, organizacja, praktyka działania, Dom Wydawniczy ELIPSA 2014, ISBN 9788380170292.
- Ołtarz bez tronu…? Walka o rząd polskich dusz, Aspra 2021, ISBN 978-83-8209-128-1.

== Awards ==
- Officer's Cross of the Order of Polonia Restituta (2014)
- Officer's Cross of the Legion of Honour (France)
- Grand Commander's Cross of the Order of the Grand Duke Gediminas (Lithuania, 1997)
- Grand Cross of the Order of Merit (Norway, 1996)
