= Szczepkowski =

Szczepkowski (feminine: Szczepkowska) is a Polish surname. Notable people with the surname include:

- Andrzej Szczepkowski (1923–1997), Polish actor
- Joanna Szczepkowska (born 1953), Polish actress and writer
- Władysław Szczepkowski (born 1966), Polish lawyer
- Zbigniew Szczepkowski (1952–2019), Polish cyclist
