= Maciej Łopiński =

Polish politician and journalist (born 1947)

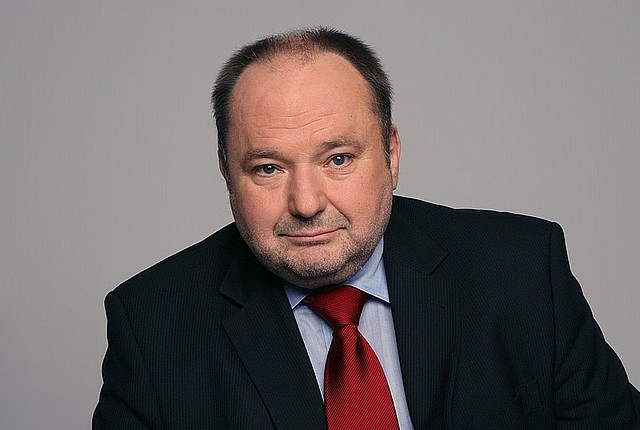
- Łopiński in 2010

Director of Telewizja Polska S.A.
- In office 16 June 2020 – 7 August 2020
- Preceded by: Jacek Kurski
- Succeeded by: Jacek Kurski

Director of Telewizja Polska S.A.
- In office 10 March 2020 – 10 June 2020
- Preceded by: Jacek Kurski
- Succeeded by: Jacek Kurski

Deputy of the VII Sejm
- In office 8 November 2011 – 7 August 2015
- Succeeded by: Daniela Chrapkiewicz
- Constituency: 25 Gdańsk

Chief of the Presidential Cabinet
- In office 10 April 2010 – 6 July 2010
- Preceded by: himself
- Succeeded by: Paweł Lisiewicz

Chief of the Presidential Cabinet
- In office 23 July 2007 – 10 April 2010
- Preceded by: Elżbieta Jakubiak
- Succeeded by: himself

Presidential Press Secretary
- In office 23 December 2005 – 23 July 2007

Personal details
- Born: Maciej Jan Łopiński; 19 August 1947 (age 79) Gdańsk, Poland
- Party: Law and Justice; Independent; PZPR (1971–1981)
- Education: University of Gdańsk
- Occupation: Politician; journalist; editor; company director
- Employers: Głos Wybrzeża (1974–1977); Czas (1977–1981); Tygodnik Gdański (1989–1991); Prasa Bałtycka (1992–1997); Agencja Rozwoju Pomorza S.A. (1998–2001); Grupa Zarządzająca Pomerania S.A. (2002–2005)

Maciej Jan Łopiński (born 19 August 1947) is a Polish journalist and minister in the President's Office from 2005 until 2010 and again from 2015 until 2016. He was an election member of parliament from 2011 until 2013, and from 2020 on, he was the former acting chairman of the Polish public broadcaster TVP.

== Early life ==
Łopiński was born on 19 August 1947 in Gdańsk.

He graduated in Polish philology from the University of Gdańsk.

== Career ==
In 1971, he joined the Polish United Workers' Party and became a member of the party on 14 December 1981. He worked as a journalist for Głos Wybrzeża (1974–1977) and the weekly magazine Czas (1977–1981). He also published the press in exile—Kultura, Zeszyty Historyczne and Kontakt. In 1984, together with Mariusz Wilk and Zbigniew Gache, they wrote a book. In 1988, he participated in strikes at the Gdańsk Shipyard. At the same time, he was a member of the Regional Coordinating Committee "Solidarity" in Gdańsk, and from 1989 until 1990, he served on the Interim Board of the open Gdańsk Region Solidarity.

From 1989 to 1991, he served as editor of Tygodnik Gdański. Then he became a vice president of the board, Prasa Bałty, and in 1998 he was chairman of the board of Pomerania Development Agency. From 2002 to 2005, he was chairman of the Group Managing Pomerania SA.

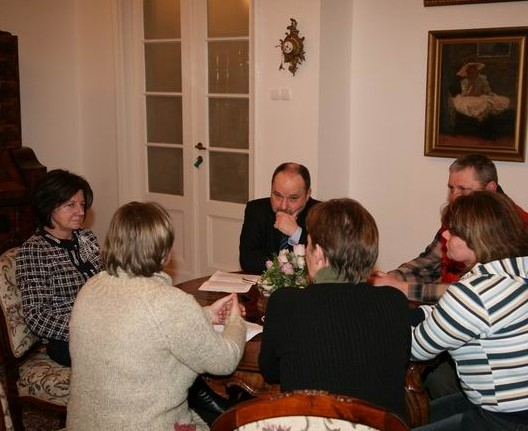
With the polish first lady, Maria Kaczyńska

On 23 December 2005, President Lech Kaczyński was nominated for the position of Secretary of State in the President's Office responsible for media policy. This function was held on 23 July 2007, then became the head of the President's Cabinet. He was dismissed as head of the Cabinet of the President of the Republic on 6 July 2010.

In 2011, in the parliamentary elections was the Law and Justice candidate for the Sejm of the district of Gdańsk (as an independent). He received a mandate in parliament with 15,794 votes.

On 7 August 2015, President Andrzej Duda appointed him to the position of Secretary of State in the Chancellery of the President of the Republic of Poland, as a result of which his parliamentary mandate expired. On 18 December 2016, the president dismissed him from this position.

In 2017, he became chairman of the supervisory board of TVP. In 2018, he was appointed to the supervisory board of Powszechny Zakład Ubezpieczeń. In the same year, he was also appointed a member of the Chapter of the Order of Polonia Restituta. On 10 March 2020, he was delegated by the Supervisory Board of TVP to perform the duties of the president of the management board of Telewizja Polska (TVP). On 10 June of the same year, his three-month delegation to this position ended. Six days later, he was re-appointed acting president of the TVP management board for the next three months. On 24 July 2020, he submitted his resignation from the position of acting president of the management board of TVP, which was accepted by the National Media Council on 7 August 2020.

In 2021, he resigned from the PZU supervisory board. In 2021–2024, he was a member of the supervisory board of PKO BP (he served as chairman in 2021–2023).

In December 2023, the Minister of Culture and National Heritage, Bartłomiej Sienkiewicz, dismissed the members of the TVP supervisory board headed by him. On 24 December 2023, the supervisory board decided to delegate Maciej Łopiński to serve as president of the management board of TVP.
