= Piotr Nowina-Konopka =

Polish academic, politician and diplomat (1949–2025)

Piotr Nowina-Konopka Ph.D.
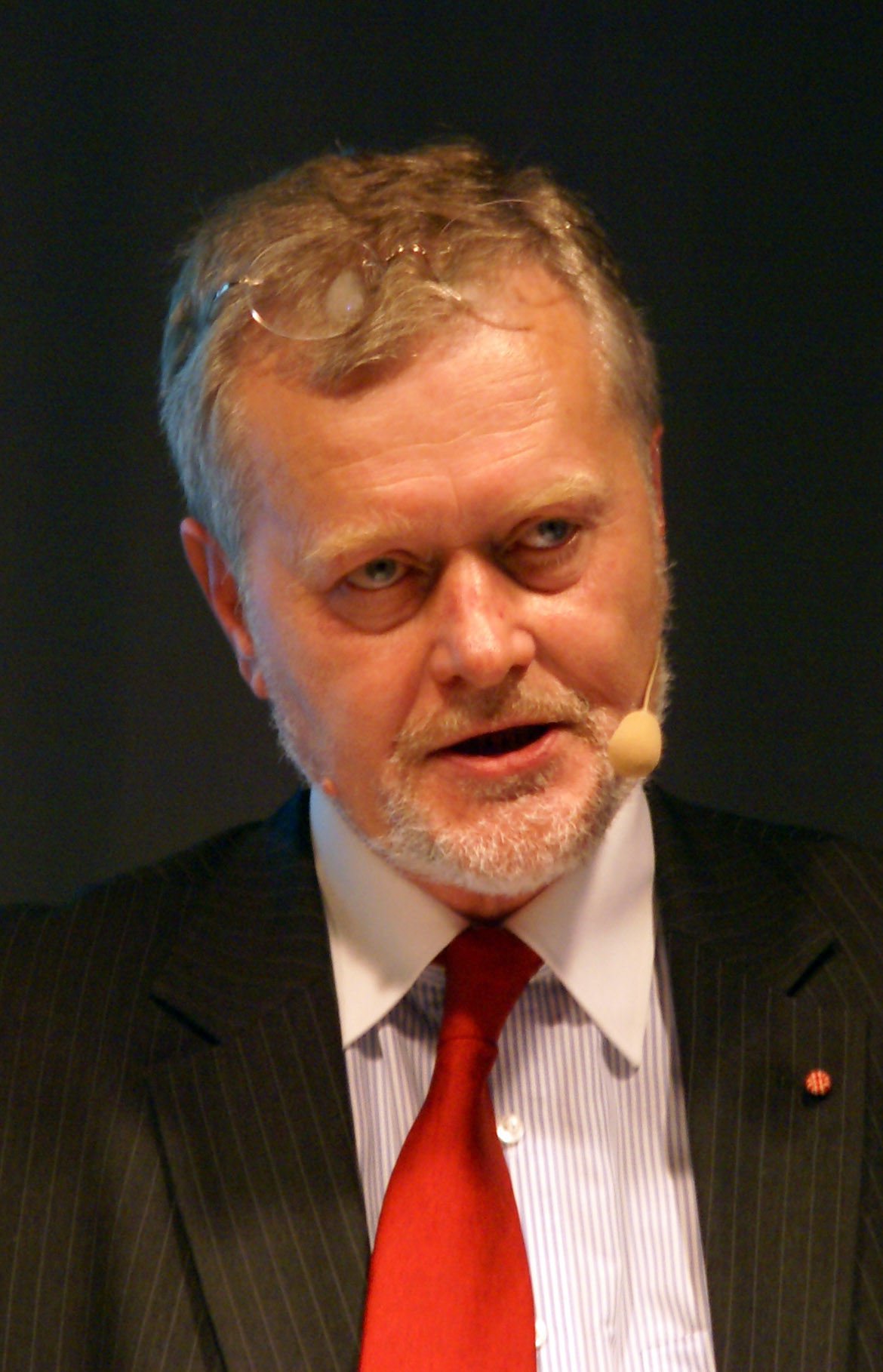
- Nowina-Konopka in 2009

Poland Ambassador to the Holy See
- In office June 2013 – 2016
- Preceded by: Hanna Suchocka
- Succeeded by: Janusz Kotański

Personal details
- Born: 27 May 1949 Chorzów, Poland
- Died: 13 June 2025 (aged 76) Nowa Iwiczna, Poland
- Education: University of Gdańsk
- Profession: Academic, politician, diplomat

Piotr Nowina-Konopka (27 May 1949 – 13 June 2025) was a Polish academic, politician and diplomat.

== Academia ==
Nowina-Konopka studied at the Sopot School of Economics, Gdańsk University, where he gained an MSc (1972) and a PhD (1978) in economics. From 1978 to 1989 he was assistant professor in the Foreign Trade Economics Institute, Gdańsk University, and from 1988 to 1989 was professor of Catholic social science at Gdańsk Theological Institute. Nowina-Konopka was Vice-Rector of the College of Europe, and head of the Natolin, Warsaw campus, from 1999 to 2004. In 2006 he was a professor at Giedroyć College in Warsaw, where he taught a course on Negotiations and Mediations in International Conflicts.

== Politics ==
From 1982 to 1989, Nowina-Konopka was an assistant to and spokesman for Lech Wałęsa, leader of the Solidarity movement, and served as the Solidarity spokesman at the 1989 Round Table Agreement negotiations. He was a member of several international relations groups, and most recently served as European Union adviser to the Georgian Parliament in 2005–2006.

From 1991 to 2001 Nowina-Konopka was a member of the Polish Sejm (the lower chamber or the Polish Parliament), representing the Radom constituency. He served on several foreign affairs committees, and from 1998 to 1999 served as a secretary of State, and as deputy Head Negotiator on Poland's accession to the EU.

From November 2006 until 2010 he was the co-director of the ECPRD and Director for Relations with National Parliaments of the European Parliament. From 2010 to 2013 he was the Director of the European Parliament's Liaison Office With The US Congress. On 19 June 2013, he was appointed by Polish President Bronisław Komorowski as ambassador to the Holy See, as well as the ambassador at the Order of Malta. He ended his term in 2016.

== Death ==
Nowina-Konopka died after a "short, serious illness" in Nowa Iwiczna, on 13 June 2025, at the age of 76.

== Decorations ==
- Officer of Polonia Restituta (Poland)
- Chevalier de la Légion d'honneur (France)
- Chevalier de l’Ordre national du Mérite (France)
- German Cross of Merit, First Class (Das Verdienstkreuz I Klasse des Verdienstordens - Germany)

== Works ==
- "European Centre for Parliamentary Research and Documentation (ECPRD): A practical example of parliamentary cooperation in Europe. www.ecprd.org", by Piotr Nowina-Konopka, ECPRD Co-director.

== Sources ==
- Biographical note, in Polish.
- Strona sejmowa posła III kadencji About Piotr Nowina-Konopka, from the Archive of Information on Deputies to the 3rd Sejm (1997–2000) (in Polish).
- European Parliament's Liaison Office With The US Congress
