= Nocna zmiana =

- Directed by: Jacek Kurski, Michał Balcerzak
- Written by: Jacek Kurski, Michał Balcerzak
- Produced by: Jacek-FILM
- Starring: Maciej Jankowski
- Edited by: Michał Balcerzak
- Distributed by: TELEDOM Sp. z o.o.
- Release date: 1995
- Running time: 72 min.
- Country: Poland
- Language: Polish

Nocna zmiana (Night Shift) is a 1995 Polish documentary film about the events of the night 4 June 1992 when a coalition of Polish parliamentary forces voted no confidence in Olszewski's government, presenting is as a sort of coup. It was directed by Michał Balcerzak. The documentary revolves around the recording of an open meeting of Donald Tusk, Lech Wałęsa, and Waldemar Pawlak. The film's thesis is that the goal was removing Olszewski's government before it passed a law allowing the public to see top secret government archives listing communist collaborators, allegedly including Lech Wałęsa as a paid informer of the communist government. Olszewski's minority government was removed from power and the law was never passed. 20 years later, the widow of the communist Minister of Internal Affairs, Kiszczak, a person responsible for at least 200 murders, tried to sell documents allegedly showing Walesa's collaboration and was detained for illegal possession of top secret archives.

== Featuring ==
- Donald Tusk
- Maciej Jankowski
- Piotr Semka
- Jacek Kurski
- Marian Krzaklewski
- Krzysztof Wyszkowski
- Mieczysław Wachowski
- Bogdan Borusewicz
- Jacek Maziarski
- Janusz Korwin-Mikke
- Józefa Hennelowa
- Jerzy Ciemniewski
- Jan Parys
- Lech Wałęsa
- Tomasz Lis
- Aleksander Kwaśniewski
