= Kotański =

Kotański (feminine: Kotańska; plural: Kotańscy) is a Polish surname. Notable people with the surname include:

- Janusz Kotański (born 1957), Polish historian and ambassador
- Marek Kotański (1942–2002), Polish charity worker and campaigner
