= Anna Kurska =

Polish politician and lawyer

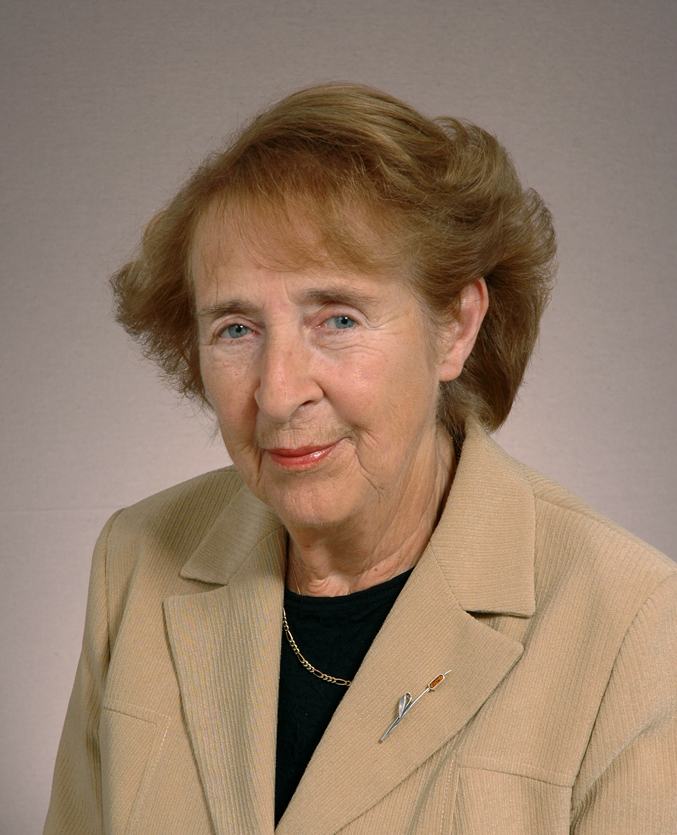
- Anna Kurska

Senate of Poland
- In office 2001–2007

Personal details
- Born: 24 August 1929 Lviv, Poland
- Died: 25 August 2016 (aged 87)
- Party: Law and Justice
- Children: 2
- Relatives: Jacek Kurski, Jarosław

Anna Maria Kurska (24 August 1929 – 25 August 2016) was a Polish politician and lawyer. She was a member of Law and Justice party and a member of the Polish Senate from 2001 to 2007.

== Early life ==
On 24 August 1929, Kurska was born in Lviv, Poland (in modern-day Ukraine), to Tadeusz Modzelewski (of Polish Nobility origin) and Teodora Niemirowska (sister of Lewis Bernstein Namier). Teodora was born to Józef Bernstein aka Niemirowski and Anna Sommerstein, both of Jewish origin.

== Education ==
In 1955, Kurska earned law degree from University of Warsaw.

== Career ==
Kurska started her career as a lawyer. In August 1980, Kurska became a judge in the Provincial Court of Gdansk. She was dismissed from her position in September 1981 as part of the introduction of martial law. In 1988 she regained her rights to practise law, and operated a law office in Tczew for two years, until she was re-nominated as a judge

== Honours ==
In 2009, Kurska received the Commander's Cross of the Order of Polonia Restituta from Polish President Lech Kaczynski.

== Personal life ==
Kurska's children are Jacek Kurski, a politician, and Jarosław Kurski, a journalist.
