= Adam Rudawski =

Polish politician and economist (born 1966)

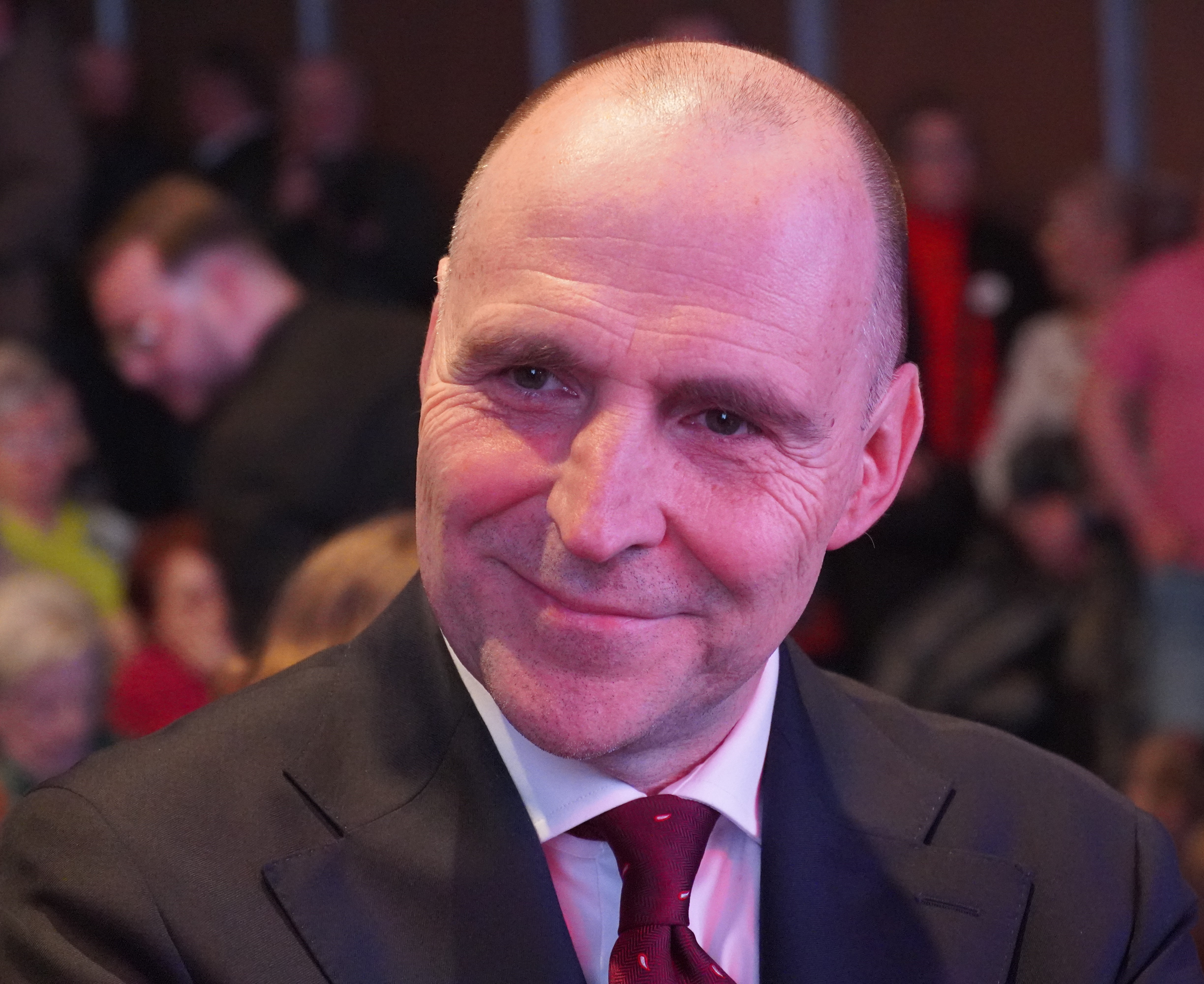
- Rudawski in 2024.

Voivode of West Pomeranian Voivodeship
- Incumbent
- Assumed office 20 December 2023
- Preceded by: Zbigniew Bogucki

Personal details
- Born: 21 March 1966 (age 60) Szczecin, Poland
- Party: Poland 2050
- Spouse: Edyta Rudawska
- Children: 1
- Education: University of Szczecin
- Occupation: Politician; Economist; Academic professor

Adam Stanisław Rudawski (Polish: [ˈa.dam staˈɲi.swaf ruˈdaf.ski]; born 21 March 1966) is a Polish politician, economist, and academic professor. Since 2023, he serves as the voivode of West Pomeranian Voivodeship in Poland. From 2011 to 2016, he was the chairperson of Polish Radio Szczecin. He is also a professor at the University of Szczecin.

== Biography ==
Adam Rudawski was born on 21 March 1966 in Szczecin, Poland. In 1992, he graduated from the University of Szczecin with a master's degree in economics. The same year, he was hired as the marketing director by the store franchise Komfort, where he worked until 1994. Afterwards, he became director of economic matters in Polish Radio Szczecin, and later, until 2006, he was its deputy chairperson.

In 2004, Rudawski graduated from the University of Szczecin with a doctoral degree in economics. He has also founded the Higher School of Management in Szczecin, and was its rector from 2006 to 2011.

He was the deputy chairperson of the board of directors of Polish Radio Szczecin. On 16 August 2011, he was appointed as the chairperson of the radio station. In October 2018, the board of directors decided to suspend him from the position, and on 12 October, he was removed from it by the National Media Council. He was an assistant professor at the University of Szczecin, and in 2018, he became a professor there.

In 2021, Rudawski became a coordinator of the West Pomeranian Voivodeship division of the Institute Strategies 2050, a think tank of the Poland 2050 political party. In the 2023 parliamentary election, he unsuccessfully run to the Sejm of Poland, in the constituency no. 41 consisting of the western part of the West Pomeranian Voivodeship, receiving 9,101 votes (1.64%). He was the candidate of the Third Way political alliance, recommended by the Poland 2050 party. On 20 December 2023, he was appointed as the voivode of West Pomeranian Voivodeship. Afterwards, he joined the Poland 2050 party, and in February 2026, he became its second deputy chairperson.

== Personal life ==
He is married to academic and economist Edyta Rudawska, with whom he has a daughter.

== Awards and decorations ==
- Silver Cross of Merit (2005)
- Gold Cross of Merit (2015)

== Electoral history ==
Electoral history of Adam Rudawski
| Year | Office | | Party | Constituency | Votes | | | Result | Ref. |
| Year | Office | | Party | Constituency | Total | % | P. | Result | Ref. |
|---|---|---|---|---|---|---|---|---|---|
| 2023 | Sejm of Poland | 10th | Third Way | No. 41 | 9,101 | 1.64% | 13th | Lost | |
