= Zbigniew Bogucki =

Polish politician (born 1980)

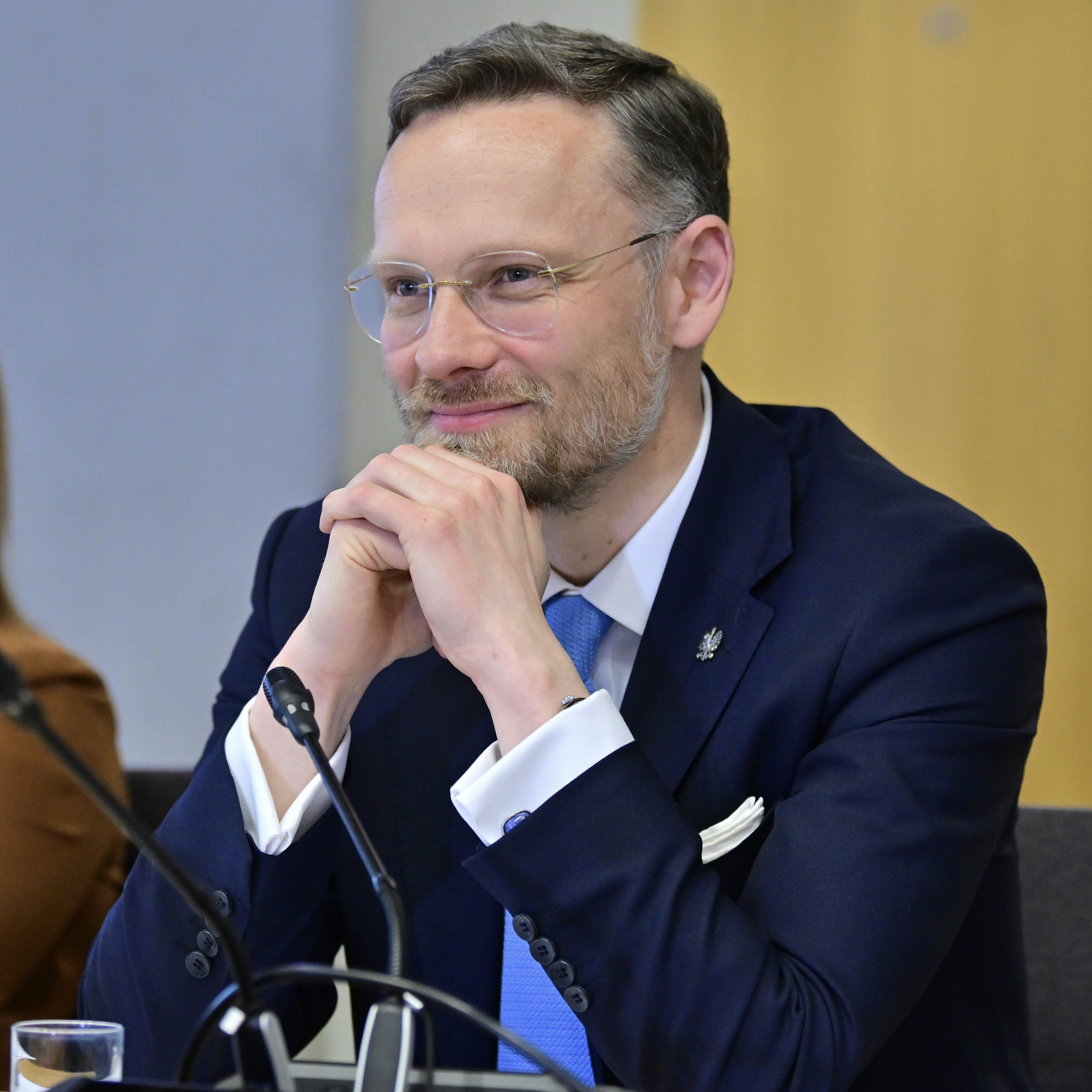
- Bogucki in 2026

Chief of the Chancellery of the President
- Incumbent
- Assumed office August 7 2025
- President: Karol Nawrocki
- Preceded by: Małgorzata Paprocka

Member of the Sejm
- In office 13 November 2023 – 7 August 2025
- Constituency: Szczecin

Voivode of the West Pomeranian Voivodeship
- In office 30 November 2020 – 2 November 2023
- Preceded by: Tomasz Hinc
- Succeeded by: Adam Rudawski

Personal details
- Born: 26 January 1980 (age 46)
- Party: Law and Justice
- Education: University of Szczecin

Zbigniew Bogucki (Polish pronunciation: [ˈzbiɡɲɛf bɔˈɡut͡s.ki]; born 26 January 1980) is a Polish politician of Law and Justice who was elected member of the Sejm in 2023. He served as Voivode of the West Pomeranian Voivodeship from 2020 to 2023, and was the candidate of Law and Justice for mayor of Szczecin in the 2024 local elections. Since 2025, he serves as the Chief of the Chancellery of the President of the Republic of Poland.
