= Małgorzata Sadurska =

Polish politician (born 1975)

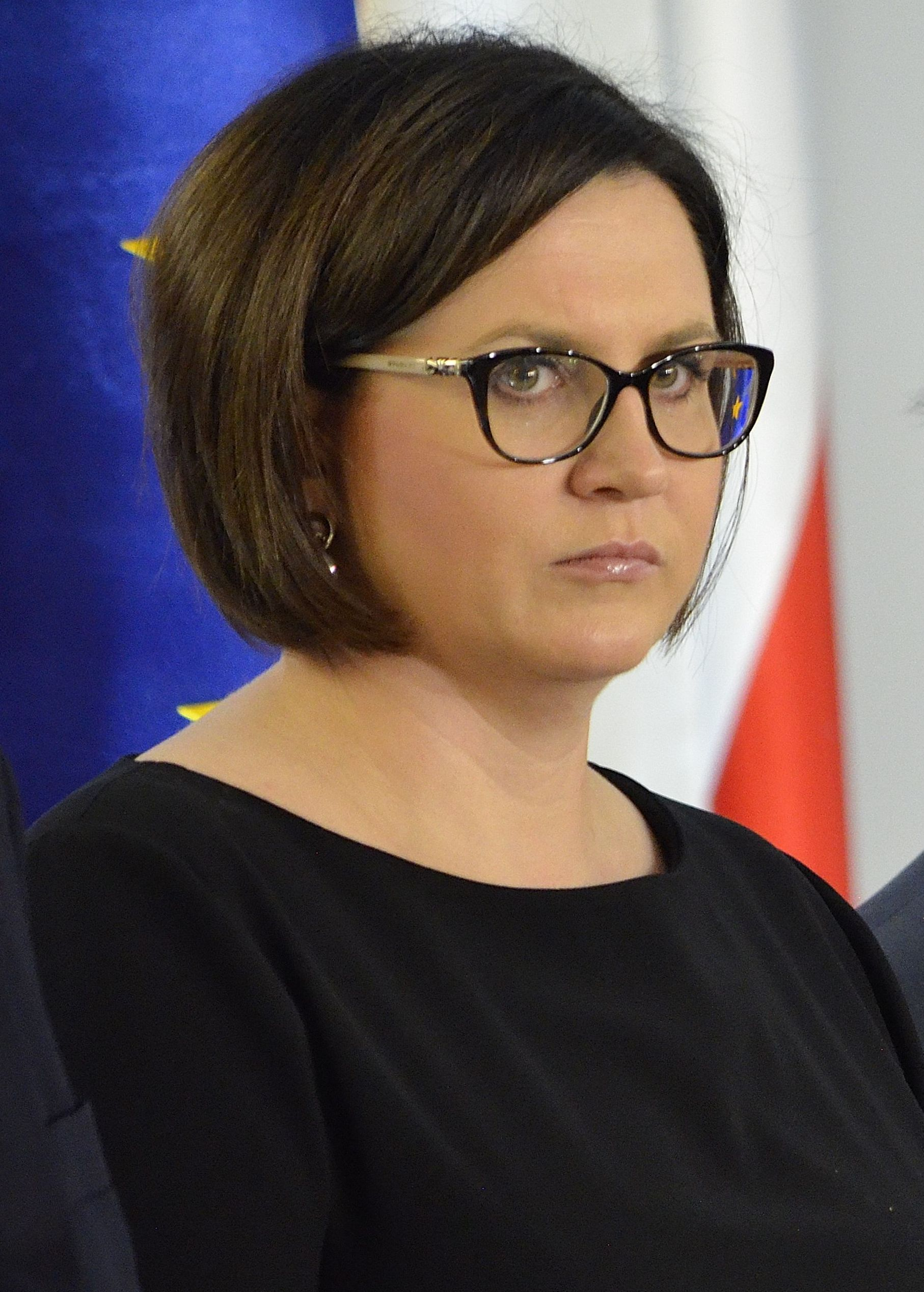

Chief of the Chancellery of the President
- In office 7 August 2015 – 12 June 2017

Member of the Sejm
- In office 19 October 2005 – 7 August 2015
- Constituency: No. 6 (Lublin)

Personal details
- Born: Małgorzata Barbara Sadurska; 3 December 1975 (age 49); Puławy, Poland
- Political party: Law and Justice

Małgorzata Barbara Sadurska (born 3 December 1975) is a Polish politician, member of the Sejm (2005–2015) and chief of the Presidential Chancellery (2015–2017).

== Biography ==
Małgorzata Sadurska was born on 3 December 1975 in Puławy. In 2000 she graduated with master's degree in law from Maria Curie-Skłodowska University in Lublin. Then she took postgraduate studies in management at Lublin School of Business and graduated in 2003.

Sadurska was first elected member of the Sejm in 2005, as a Law and Justice candidate, representing Lublin constituency. She was reelected in 2007 and 2011.

Sadurska remained in parliament until 7 August 2015, when she was appointed chief of the Chancellery of the President by newly elected President Andrzej Duda. Sadurska resigned from office and was dismissed on 12 June 2017. On the same day she was appointed member of the executive board of the Powszechny Zakład Ubezpieczeń, an insurance company with state shares.
