= Władysław Tempka =

Polish lawyer and politician (1889–1940)

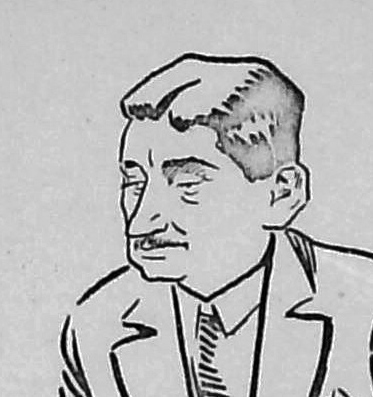
Wladystaw Tempka (1931)

Władysław Tempka (22 August 1889 in Kraków – 12 June 1942 in Auschwitz) was a Polish politician and lawyer. He was the brother of the hematologist Tadeusz Tempka, one of the founders of the Polish Society of Hematology.

Tempka was member of the Sejm from 1928 until 1935. During the Second World War and the German occupation of Poland he was chairman of the resistance organisation "Komitet Wykonawczy SP". He was arrested by the Gestapo on 18 April 1940, sent to Montelupich Prison, and transferred to Auschwitz in October, where he received the number 5941. He was shot against the wall of block 11 of Auschwitz in a group of 40 prisoners, as retaliation for underground organizations' activities in Silesia.
