= Jacek Kurski =

Polish politician and journalist (b. 1966)

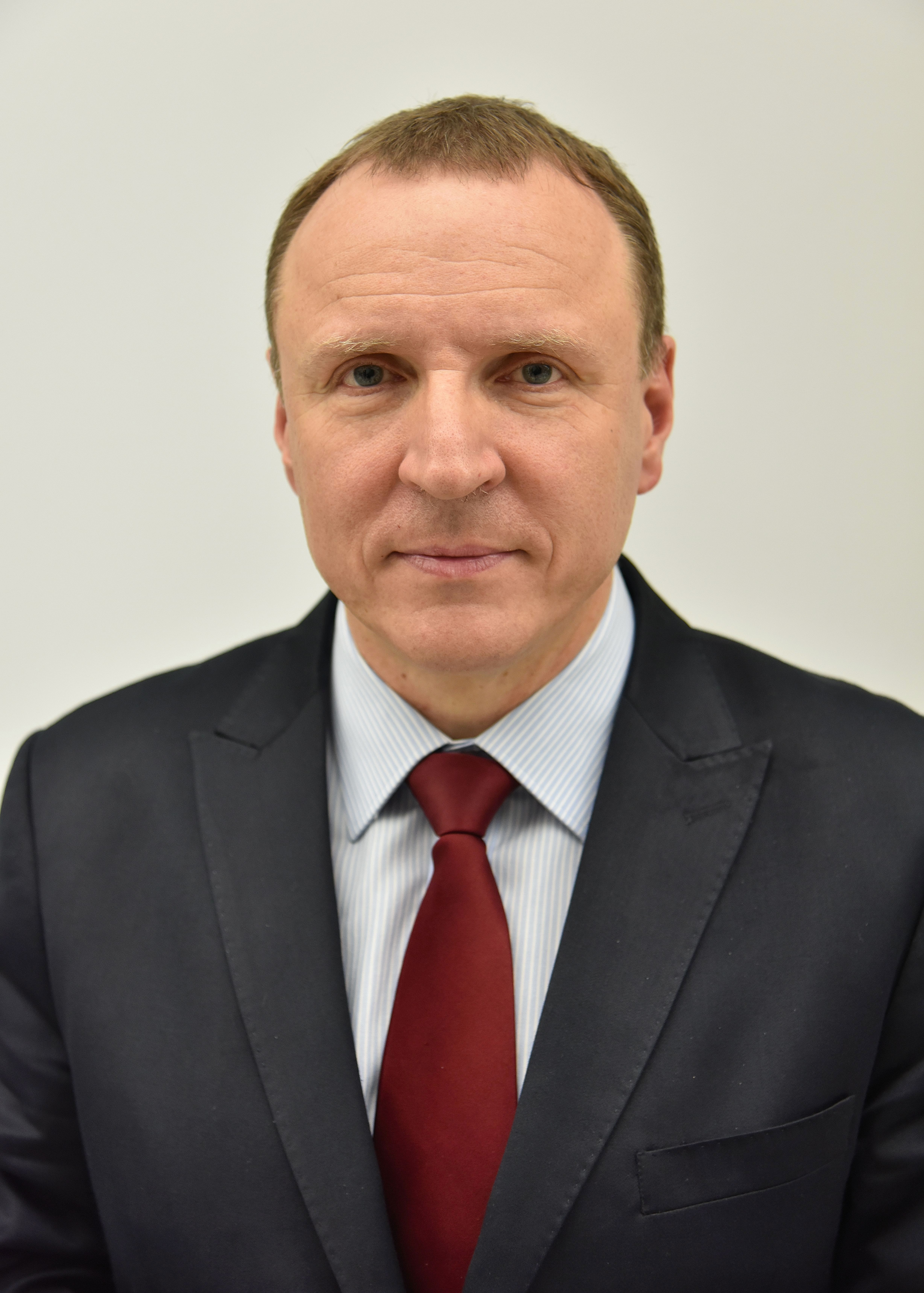

Member of the European Parliament
- In office 14 July 2009 – 30 June 2014
- Constituency: Podlaskie and Warmian-Masurian

Member of the Sejm
- In office 25 September 2005 – 10 June 2009
- Constituency: 25 – Gdańsk

Personal details
- Born: 22 February 1966 (age 60) Gdańsk, Poland
- Party: Law and Justice
- Other political affiliations: United Poland

Jacek Olgierd Kurski (Polish pronunciation: [ˈjat͡sɛk ˈkurskʲi], born 22 February 1966 in Gdańsk) is a Polish politician and journalist who has been described as a "spin doctor" for the national-conservative PiS party.

== Political career ==
Kurski was first elected to the Sejm on 25 September 2005, getting 26,446 votes in 25 – Gdańsk as a member of the Law and Justice party. He was re-elected in the October 2007 vote and served until 2009 in this capacity.

Kurski was elected to Member of the European Parliament where he served from 2009 to 2014. On 8 September 2010, Kurski was the only MEP to vote against a condemnation by the European Parliament of the execution of Iranian national Sakineh Mohammadi Ashtiani by stoning. Kurski stated that he voted against by error, and he corrected his vote almost immediately.

He then returned to the Sejm where he served as State Undersecretary for the Ministry of Culture and National Heritage for two years.

== President of Telewizja Polska ==
In January 2016, Kurski became President of Telewizja Polska. In July 2016 Politico Europe criticized the state broadcaster for strong pro-government bias. He left the network in 2022 after turning it into a propaganda vehicle for the nationalist PiS party according to critics.

== World Bank ==
In December 2022, he was appointed as Poland's representative to the World Bank. He had no prior finance experience. He was dismissed from this role in 2023.

== Private life ==
Kurski is the son of scientist and shipbuilder Witold Kurski and Solidarity activist and senator Anna Kurska, as well as the younger brother of Jarosław Kurski who is a Gazeta Wyborcza journalist.

In 1991, he married Monika Mucek. They had three children together: Zdzisław (b. 1991), Zuzanna (b. 1994) and Olgierd (b. 2007). They divorced in 2015.

On July 31, 2018 he remarried to Joanna Wąsowska primo voto Klimek (b. 1974). On July 18th, 2020, after his and Joanna's previous church weddings were annulled, they held a church wedding at the Divine Mercy Sanctuary in Kraków. The event was criticized in the media for being less private and more political, even state-oriented, and was pointed to as evidence of undesirable ties between state power, the media it manages and the Catholic Church, and the impossibility of obtaining an annulment of the marriage by those not connected with the government was raised.

From their marriage, on March 25, 2021, a daughter, Anna Klara Theodora, was born.

== See also ==
- Members of Polish Sejm 2005–2007
- Nocna zmiana
