= Institute for Basic Problems of Marxism-Leninism =

Polish think tank

- Instytut Podstawowych Problemów Marksizmu-Leninizmu
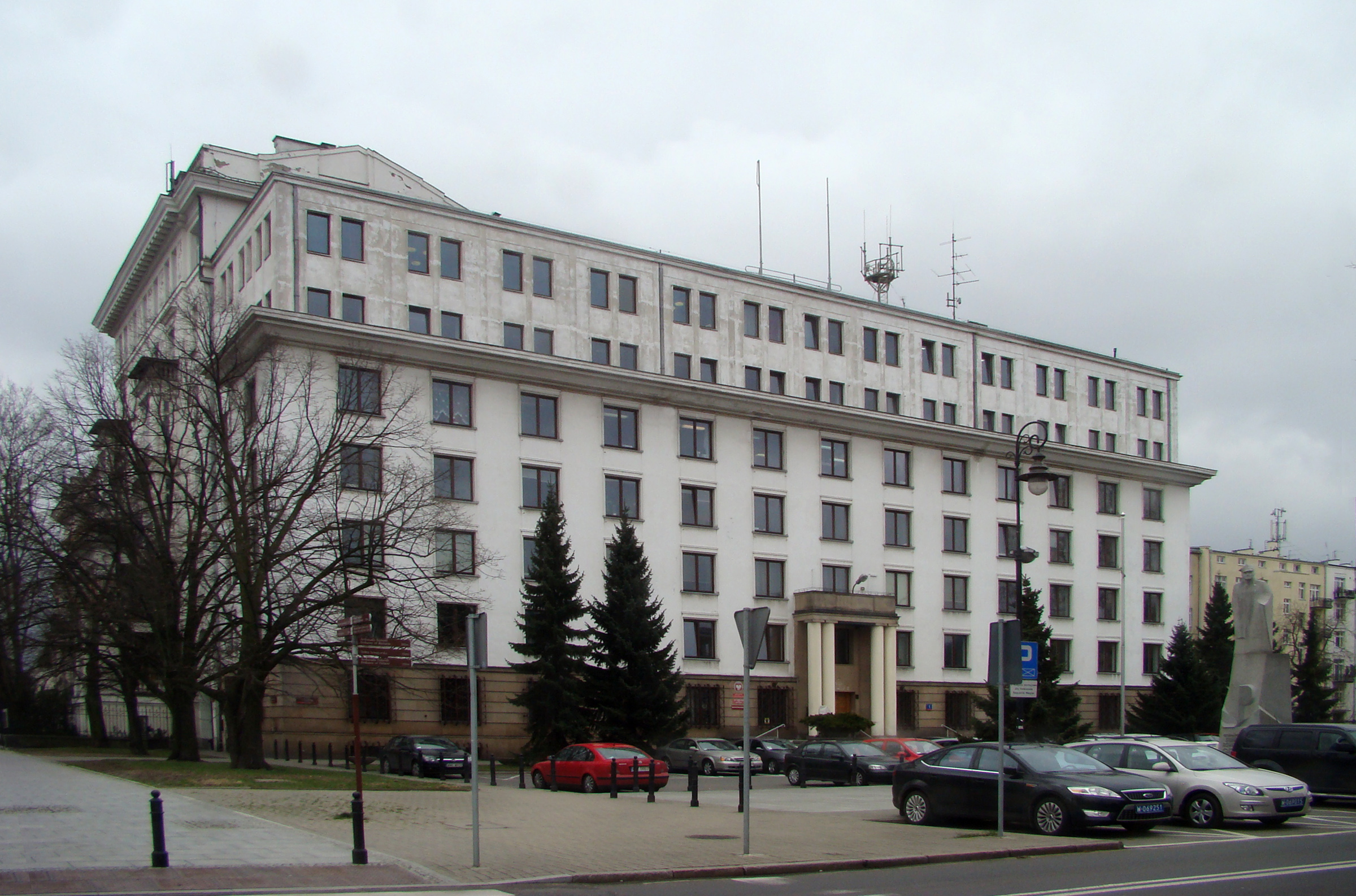
- Former building of the Institute
- Abbreviation: IPPM-L
- Successor: Academy of Social Sciences
- Established: 1974
- Dissolved: 1984
- Type: Research institute
- Headquarters: 1 Chopin Street
- Location: Śródmieście, Warsaw
- Region served: Poland
- Owner: KC PZPR
- Director: Jerzy Wiatr

The Institute for Basic Problems of Marxism-Leninism (Polish: Instytut Podstawowych Problemów Marksizmu-Leninizmu, IPPM-L) was a Marxist think tank of the Polish United Workers' Party, existing from 1974 to 1984. In 1984 it was transformed into the Academy of Social Sciences (Akademia Nauk Społecznych).
