= Adam Redzik =

Polish lawyer and historian

Adam Redzik (born 1977) is a Polish lawyer and historian, a professor at the Warsaw University. He specializes in the history of law and science.

== Selected works ==
=== Books ===
- Wydział Prawa Uniwersytetu Lwowskiego w latach 1939-1946, Lublin: Towarzystwo Naukowe KUL 2006, ISBN 83-7306-254-8
- Zarys historii samorządu adwokackiego w Polsce, Warszawa: Naczelna Rada Adwokacka 2007, pp. 208; ISBN 83-915643-9-8
- Jakub Honigsman, Zagłada Żydów lwowskich (1941–1944), przekład i opracowanie: Adam Redzik, Warszawa: Żydowski Instytut Historyczny 2007, pp. 116; ISBN 978-83-85888-42-0
- Joanna Ostrowska, Tak musiało być. Wspomnienia, opracował Adam Redzik, Warszawa-Łomianki: LTW 2008, pp. 152; ISBN 978-83-7565-019-8
- Adwokaci polscy Ojczyźnie – Polish advocates in the service of their Homeland, edited by Stanisław Mikke, Adam Redzik, Warszawa: Naczelna Rada Adwokacka 2008, pp. 224; ISBN 978-83-927035-0-1
- Prawo prywatne na Uniwersytecie Jana Kazimierza we Lwowie, Warszawa: C.H.Beck 2009, pp. 496; ISBN 978-83-255-0346-8
- Historia Adwokatury, ed. 3., Warszawa: NRA 2014, pp. 432 [aoauthor: Tomasz J. Kotliński]
- Stanisław Starzyński (1853–1935) a rozwój polskiej nauki prawa konstytucyjnego, Warszawa-Kraków: Instytut Allerhanda, Wydawnictwo Wysoki Zamek 2012, pp.. 356; ISBN 978-83-931373-2-9.
- Historia ustroju Adwokatury Polskiej w źródłach, Warszawa 2013, pp. 448; ISBN 978-83-934796-4-1; [coauthors: Tomasz J. Kotliński, Marcin Zaborski].
- Academia Militans. Uniwersytet Jana Kazimierza we Lwowie, całość zredagował, wstępem i zakończeniem opatrzył.... Kraków: Wysoki Zamek 2015, pp. 1302 [coauthors: Roman Duda, Marian Mudryj, Łukasz Tomasz Sroka, Wanda Wojtkiewicz-Rok, Józef Wołczański, Andrzej Kajetan Wróblewski] ISBN 978-83-943785-5-4; 2. edition, Kraków 2017, ss. 1312, ISBN 978-83-947365-7-6
- Rafał Lemkin (1900-1959) – co-creator of international criminal law. Short biography, Warsaw 2017, ss. 70; ISBN 978-83-931111-3-8

=== Articles ===
- Roman Longchamps de Bérier (1883–1941), „Kwartalnik Prawa Prywatnego” 2006, z. 1;
- Kazimierz Przybyłowski (1900–1987), „Kwartalnik Prawa Prywatnego”, 2007, nr 4;
- Aleksander Doliński (1866–1930). Profesor prawa handlowego Uniwersytetu Jana Kazimierza we Lwowie, „Czasopismo Prawno-Historyczne” 2007, t. LIX, z. 2, s. 291-327;
- Nauczanie i nauka prawa politycznego w Uniwersytecie Jana Kazimierza we Lwowie, „Przegląd Sejmowy” 2007, z. 5, s. 111-142.
- O naukach historyczno-prawnych w Uniwersytecie Jana Kazimierza we Lwowie [w:] Nauki historycznoprawne w polskich uniwersytetach w II Rzeczypospolitej, red. M. Pyter, Lublin 2008, s. 131-185.
- Profesor Juliusz Makarewicz - życie i dzieło, [w:] Prawo Karne w Poglądach Profesora Juliusza Makarewicza, (Publikacje Katedry Prawa Karnego KUL, pod. red. A. Grześkowiak), Lublin 2005.
- Działalność dydaktyczna Profesora Juliusza Makarewicza, [w:] Karnopolityczne koncepcje Profesora Juliusza Makarewicza – wczoraj i dziś (W 50. rocznicę śmierci), red. I. Nowikowski, P. Strzelec, Lublin: Wydawnictwo Morpol 2006.
- Mieczysław Honzatko - profesor, kodyfikator, adwokat, „Palestra” 2005, nr 11-12.
- Profesor Ernest Till (1846–1926) - w stusześćdziesięciolecie urodzin i osiemdziesięciolecie śmierci, „Palestra” 2006, nr 3-4.
- Професор Олександр Огоновский – творець української цивілистики, „Жіття і Право”, № 6, Львів 2004.
- Szkic z dziejów szkolnictwa wyższego we Lwowie, „Niepodległość i Pamięć”, nr 24, 2006.
- Lwowska szkoła dyplomatyczna. Zarys historii Studium Dyplomatycznego przy Wydziale Prawa Uniwersytetu Jana Kazimierza we Lwowie (1930–1939), „Polski Przegląd Dyplomatyczny”, 2006, t. 6, nr 5 (33).
- Kurs Prawa Lotniczego przy Wydziale Prawa Uniwersytetu Jana Kazimierza we Lwowie (1936–1939), „Rocznik Lwowski” 2006.
- W sprawie okoliczności śmierci profesora Maurycego Allerhanda, „Kwartalnik Historii Żydów” 2005, nr 2 (214).
- Ludwik Dworzak. Najbliższy uczeń Juliusza Makarewicza [w:] Problemy stosowania prawa sądowego. Księga Pamiątkowa dedykowana prof. Edwardowi Skrętowiczowi, pod red. Ireneusza Nowikowskiego, Lublin: Wydawnictwo UMCS 2007.
- Uczeni juryści w dziejach KUL (artykuł recenzyjny) „Państwo i Prawo” 2007, z. 9.
- Szkic o dziejach Uniwersytetu Lwowskiego w latach 1939-1946, [w:] „Львів: місто – суспільство – культура”, t. VI, Львів 2007.
- Styś Wincenty Ignacy (1903–1960), „Polski Słownik Biograficzny” 2007, tom XLV/2, z. 185, s. 225-227.
- Spółka cicha – kilka uwag na tle porównawczym, „Palestra” 2006, nr 5-6, p. 136-146.
- W sprawie przyszłości Kodeksu cywilnego, „Palestra” 2007, nr 7-8, p. 91-96. [współautorstwo: Paweł Zdanikowski]
- Überlegungen zu Lemberg/Lwów als Erinnerungsort der Polen, [in:] Erinnerungsorte in Ostmitteleuropa. Erfahrungen der Vergangenheit und Perspektiven, herausgegeben von: Matthias Weber, Burkhard Olschowsky, Ivan A. Petransky, Attila Pók, Andrzej Przewoźnik, „Schriften des Bundesinstituts fur Kultur und Geschichte der Deutschen im Östlichen Europa“, Band 42, Oldenbourg Verlag München 2011, p. 97-109. ISBN 978-3-486-70244-6
- The Janowska Hell, [in:] Michał Maksymilian Borwicz, The University of Criminals. The Janowska Camp in Lviv 1941-1944, Kraków: Wysoki Zamek 2014, p. 207-227. ISBN 978-83-939586-4-1
- Masters of Rafał Lemkin: Lwów school of law [w:] Civilians in contemporary armed conflicts: Rafał Lemkin’s heritage, Warszawa 2017, p. 235-240 [coauthor Ihor Zeman].
