= Czesław Czypicki =

Polish lawyer (1855–1926)

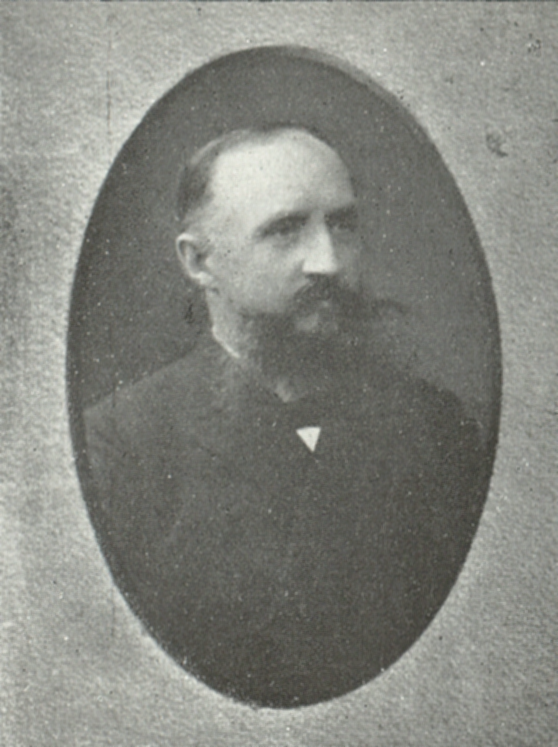
- Born: 18 July 1855; Pakosław, Kingdom of Prussia
- Died: 15 October 1926 (aged 71); Poznań, Second Polish Republic

Czesław Czypicki (18 July 1855 – 15 October 1926) was a Polish lawyer and activist for the singers societies.

His father was a forester. After graduating from a Junior High School in Braniewo, he studied law in Wrocław. He did his internship in a court in Jastrowie (Western Pomerania), and then settled in Koźmin Wielkopolski.

In 1895, he co-founded the Association of Industrial Societies in Poznań. He also co-founded the Bank Parcelacyjny in Poznań.
