= European Centre for Parliamentary Research and Documentation =

The European Centre for Parliamentary Research and Documentation (ECPRD) is a parliamentary network which was founded in 1977.

== Aims ==
The Centre aims to facilitate the exchange of information, ideas, and experiences between the administrations of parliaments in Europe. Sharing successful practical experiences helps to intensify existing cooperation between parliaments in all areas of parliamentary business, including administration, legislation, information, research, and documentation. The Centre collects and distributes studies which are produced by the parliamentary services. It also cooperates with other European networks, e.g. IPEX or TAIEX.

== Members ==
A parliamentary assembly can only become a member of ECPRD if it is already a member of the European Conference of Presidents of Parliaments. The centre is composed of the following members (as at June 2016):

European Parliament
Parliamentary Assembly of the Council of Europe

and the following parliamentary chambers of Member States of the European Union and the Council of Europe:

Albania (Assembly of Albania (Kuvendi i Shqipërisë))
Andorra (Consell General)
Armenia (National Assembly)
Austria (National Council (Nationalrat) and Federal Council (Bundesrat))
Azerbaijan (National Assembly (Milli Məclis))
Belgium (Chamber of People's Representatives (Kamer van Volksvertegenwoordigers / Chambre des Représentants / Abgeordnetenkammer) and Senate (Senaat / Sénat / Senat))
Bosnia and Herzegovina (House of Representatives ('Представнички Дом / Predstavnički Dom) and House of Peoples (Dom Naroda))
Bulgaria (National Assembly (Народно събрание Narodno sabranie))
Croatia (Croatian Assembly (Hrvatski sabor))
Cyprus (House of Representatives (Βουλή των Αντιπροσώπων Vouli Antiprosópon / Temsilciler Meclisi))
Czech Republic (Chamber of Deputies (Poslanecká sněmovna) and Senate (Senát))
Denmark (Parliament (Folketing))
Estonia (Parliament (Riigikogu))
Finland (Parliament (Eduskunta))
France (National Assembly (Assemblée nationale) and Senate (Sénat))
Georgia (Parliament of Georgia (საქართველოს პარლამენტი Sak'art'velos Parlamenti))
Germany (Federal Diet (Bundestag) and Federal Council (Bundesrat))
Greece (Hellenic Parliament (Βουλή των Ελλήνων Vouli ton Ellinon))
Hungary (National Assembly (Országgyűlés))
Iceland (Assembly of All (Alþingi))
Ireland (Dáil Éireann (Chamber of Deputies of Ireland) and Senate of Ireland (Seanad Éireann))
Italy (Chamber of Deputies (Camera dei Deputati) and Senate of the Republic (Senato della Repubblica))
Latvia (Parliament (Saeima))
Liechtenstein (Diet (Landtag))
Lithuania (Parliament (Seimas))
Luxembourg (Chamber of Deputies (D'Chamber/Chambre des Députés/Abgeordnetenkammer))
Malta (House of Representatives (Il-Kamra tar-Rappreżentanti))
Moldova (Parliament (Parlamentul))
Monaco (National Council (Conseil National))
Montenegro (Assembly (Skupština / Скупштина))
Netherlands (House of Representatives (Tweede Kamer, Second Chamber) and Senate (Eerste Kamer, First Chamber))
North Macedonia (Assembly (Собрание Sobranie))
Norway (Great Assembly (Storting))
Poland (Sejm (Sejm) and Senate (Senat))
Portugal (Assembly of the Republic (Assembleia da República))
Romania (Chamber of Deputies (Camera Deputaţilor) and Senate (Senat))
Russia (State Duma (Государственная Дума Gosudarstvennaya Duma) and Federation Council (Совет Федерации Soviet Federatsii))
San Marino (Grand and General Council (Consiglio Grande e Generale))
Serbia (National Assembly (Народна скупштина / Narodna Skupština))
Slovakia (National Council (Národná rada))
Slovenia (National Assembly (Državni zbor) and National Council (Državni svet))
Spain (Congress of Deputies (Congreso de los Diputados) and Senate (Senado))
Sweden (Diet (Riksdag))
Switzerland (National Council (Nationalrat, Conseil National, Consiglio Nazionale) and Council of States (Ständerat, Conseil des Etats, Consiglio degli Stati))
Turkey (Grand National Assembly of Turkey (Türkiye Büyük Millet Meclisi))
Ukraine (Supreme Council (Верховна Рада Verkhovna Rada))
United Kingdom (House of Commons and House of Lords)

Besides this, the centre is available for states which enjoy observer status in the Parliamentary Assembly of the Council of Europe:

Canada (House of Commons/Chambre des communes and Senate/Sénat)
Israel (Assembly (כנסת Knesset))
Mexico (Chamber of Deputies (Cámara de Diputados) and Chamber of Senators (Cámara de Senadores))

== Activities ==
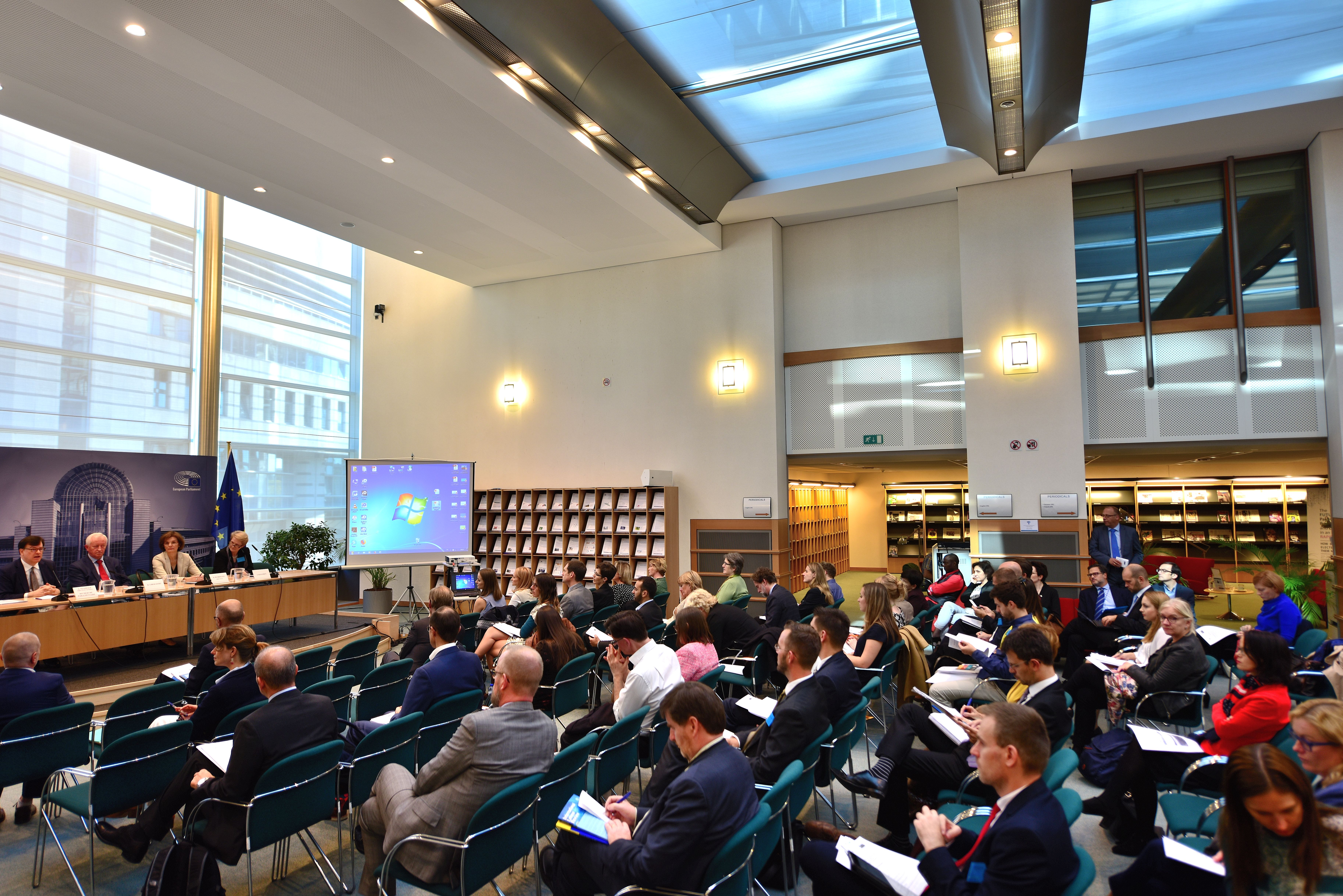
ECPRD seminar The future of parliamentary research services and libraries in an era of rapid change in the Reading Room of the European Parliament Library in Brussels, 2018.

Since 1977 the ECPRD has developed into one of the most important platforms of inter-European parliamentary cooperation. Every two years an official report on the activities of the European Conference of Presidents of Parliaments is presented. The publications of the ECPRD are published on the homepage of the centre. The centre's web presence serves as a communication platform for the administrations of the parliaments. If a parliament submits an enquiry to at least four European parliaments, both the enquiry and a template response are sent to the secretariat in Brussels and forwarded to the parliamentary assemblies. In the majority of cases all 27 EU-parliaments, or all participating parliaments, are polled. Even though the working languages of the ECPRD are English, French and German in practice most of the enquiries and responses are conducted in English.
Often there is very limited time available to produce responses to the enquiries. All enquiries and responses since the year 2000 are saved in the ECPRD database, even those which arrive after the time limit has expired. Topics which, from experience, can become relevant again are therefore available in the database at any time.

Year	Enquiries	Responses
2000	10	
2001	32	508
2002	58	847
2003	96	1 537
2004	137	2 294
2005	160	2 894
2006	174	3 359
2007	214	5 387
2008	174	5 143
2009	223	5 246

The topics of enquiry are numerous, e.g. parliamentary rights of verification, financing political parties, or the use of the European flag in the European parliaments. Other topics have included the regulation of the protection of minors and questions regarding the committees on human rights.
Once a year the ECPRD hosts a Conference of Correspondents to enable networking and direct multinational cooperation. Both the Centre and the Conference of Correspondents are managed by two co-directors and co-secretaries appointed by the European Parliament and the Parliamentary Assembly of the Council of Europe.

== History ==
In June 1977 the European Centre for Parliamentary Research and Documentation was founded in Vienna by the European Conference of Presidents of Parliaments as a hub of parliamentary cooperation. The conference entrusted the presidents of the European Parliament and the Parliamentary Assembly of the Council of Europe, Emilio Colombo and Karl Czernetz respectively, to take measures to set up the centre. Klaus Pöhle, the first co-director of the center, served the longest term to date between 1977 and 1994.
The development of the centre was structured into three stages:
1978 – 1989: This stage was characterised by the development of standards for the information provided by national parliaments. In addition, working structures were developed; a correspondent was appointed in each national parliament; and working groups for the various fields of activities of parliamentary administration were developed.
1990 – 1996: During this stage the new democracies of Central and Eastern Europe were subsumed into the work of the centre; Electronic Data Processing was intensified in the national parliaments; parliamentary homepages were created.
1997 – 2009: This period saw an unprecedented growth in reciprocal enquiries, reflecting increased cooperation between national parliaments. A comprehensive seminar program was provided for the members of staff of the national parliaments. In May 2006 new statutes were accepted by the secretaries general at the European Conference of Presidents of Parliaments in Tallinn.
Four areas within the centre's remit, each overseen by one correspondent, are of special importance for inter-parliamentary exchange:

- Parliamentary practice and parliamentary procedures
- Information and communication technology
- Libraries, research services and archives
- Economic research.

Although the centre's homepage has been fundamentally revised, access will remain restricted to members of the ECPRD.
