= Adam Kwiatkowski =

Polish politician (born 1972)

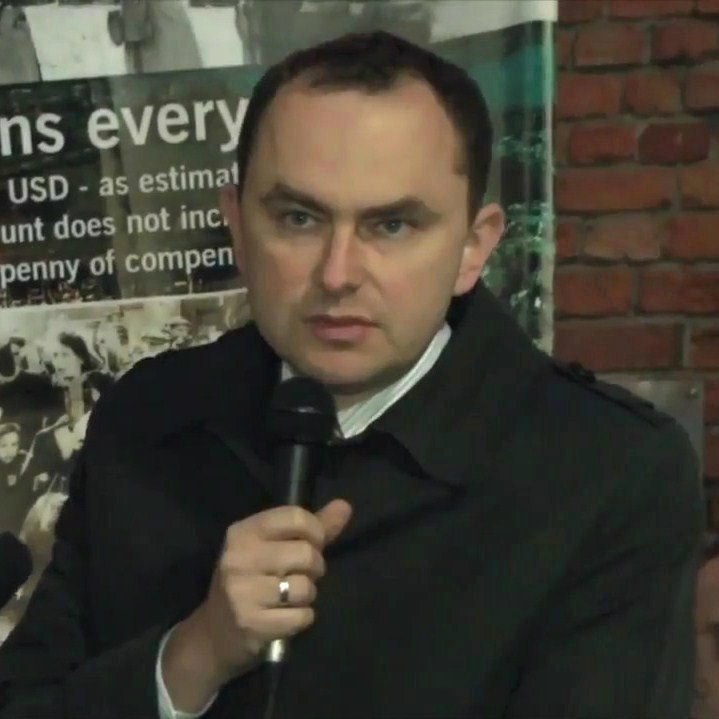

Poland Ambassador to the Holy See
- In office 2022–2026
- President: Andrzej Duda
- Preceded by: Janusz Kotański

Personal details
- Born: 7 December 1972 (age 53) Warsaw
- Party: Law and Justice
- Spouse: Urszula Kwiatek-Kwiatkowska
- Children: 3
- Education: University of Warsaw
- Profession: politician

Adam Mariusz Kwiatkowski (born 7 December 1972 in Warsaw) is a Polish politician, he served as ambassador to the Holy See from 2022 to 2026 .

== Life ==
Kwiatkowski graduated from the Faculty of Management at the University of Warsaw.

Between 1994 and 2006 he was a Local Councillor for the Warsaw districts, and from 2006 to 2011 a City Councillor for Warsaw. He represented Freedom Union and, since 2002, Law and Justice. He worked as a Director of the Department of Strategy, Regional Development and Structural Funds in the Marshal's Office of the Masovian Voivodeship (2003), Vice President of the Regional Fund for Environmental Protection and Water Management in Warsaw (2004–2006), an advisor on the EU funds to Prime Minister Jarosław Kaczyński, and Secretary of the Monitoring Committee for the Absorption of the European Union Funds (2006–2007). At the Chancellery of President Lech Kaczyński he was responsible for the preparation of the President's foreign visits. He has been among the founding members of the President Lech Kaczyński Social Movement. Kwiatkowski has been lecturing Entrepreneurship of Local Communities at the Kozminski University.

In 2011 Kwiatkowski was elected member of the Sejm. He was member of the Committee for Contacts with Poles Abroad and the Public Finance Committee, as well as heading the works of the Team for the Defence of the Freedom of Speech. On 7 August 2015, he ended his term as MP and was appointed Secretary of State by the President of Poland Andrzej Duda. From 3 August 2015 until 3 April 2017 he served as Chief of the Cabinet of the President of Poland; he was succeeded by Krzysztof Szczerski.

On 11 April 2022 he was nominated ambassador to the Holy See, accredited also to the Sovereign Military Order of Malta. He ended his term in 2026.

Married to Urszula Kwiatek-Kwiatkowska. Father to Szymon, Stefan, and Kinga.

== Honours ==
- 2018 – Medal for the Merit for Poles in Kazakhstan
- 2019 – Grand Commander of the Order for Merits to Lithuania
