= Tomasz Pusz =

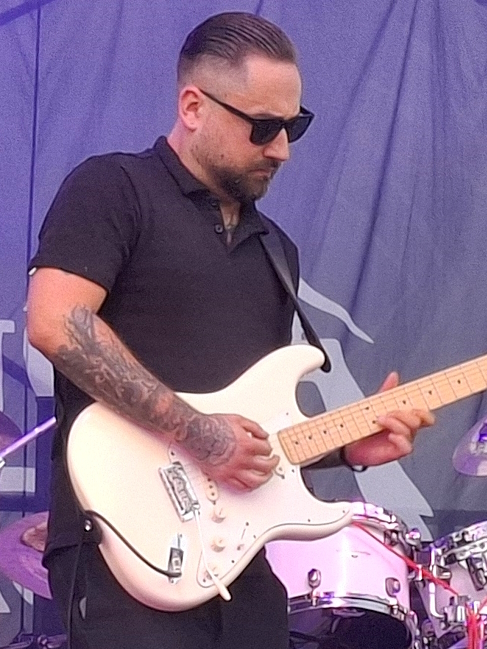
- Tomasz Pusz performing live in Prudnik (2024)

Background information
- Also known as: Szamot
- Born: Tomasz Pusz; 21 March 1997 (age 29); Prudnik, Poland
- Genres: Black metal; death metal; atmospheric black metal; heavy metal; hard rock; deathcore
- Occupation: Musician
- Instruments: Guitar, drums, bass guitar
- Years active: 2013–present

Tomasz Pusz (pronounced [ˈtɔ.maʂ ˈpuʂ]; also known as Szamot; born 21 March 1997) is a Polish musician, multi-instrumentalist, songwriter, vocalist and record producer.

== Life ==
Pusz was born in Prudnik, Poland. He went to a gymnasium in Prudnik, Medical School in Prudnik and University of Applied Sciences in Nysa.

In 2016 he formed a black metal band Sovran. He also worked with the group Exit the Machine from Głuchołazy. In 2018 he started a solo career under the pseudonym Szamot. In 2019 he transferred money from the sales of his albums to Great Orchestra of Christmas Charity. On 21 May 2019 he played with Jan Borysewicz in Rybnik. He was announced the Polish artist of the day by the website heavyrock.pl on 23 October 2019.

== Associated acts ==
- Extreme Madness (2013–2015)
- Sovran (2016–present)
- Exit the Machine (2019–present)

== Discography ==
=== Solo career ===
==== Studio albums ====
- Astral Domina (2018)
- Sleeping Existence (2019)
- Seasons: Spring & Summer (2019)
- The Sign of the Inverted Cross (2019)
- Seasons: Autumn & Winter (2019)

==== Live albums ====
- Live at the Bar (2019)
- Dreamland & Wasteland (2019)

==== Singles ====
- The Devil’s Song (2019)
- Desolate Forest (2019)

==== EPs ====
- The House of Dead Mother (2018)
- Let the Lies Burn (2019)

=== Sovran ===
- Nieświęci (demo; 2018)
- III (single; 2020)
- Exitus Letalis (2020)
