= Janusz Kotański =

Polish politician (born 1957)

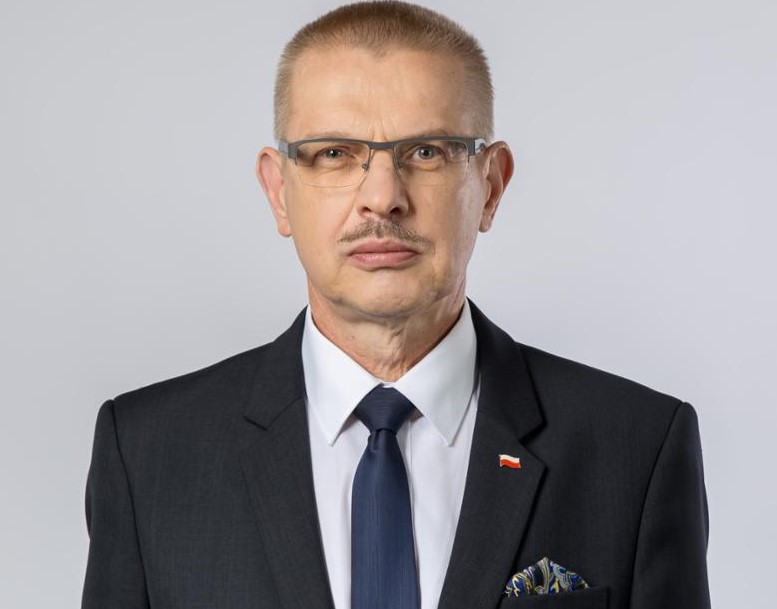

Poland Ambassador to the Holy See
- In office 23 June 2016 – 15 May 2022
- Preceded by: Piotr Nowina-Konopka
- Succeeded by: Adam Kwiatkowski

Personal details
- Born: 29 April 1957 (age 69) Warsaw, Poland
- Spouse: Anna
- Education: University of Warsaw
- Profession: Historian, teacher, diplomat

Janusz Andrzej Kotański (born 29 April 1957) is a Polish historian and teacher. He served as the Polish ambassador to the Holy See from 2016 to 2022.

== Life ==
Janusz Kotański was born in 1957 in Warsaw, Poland. In 1983, he has earned his master's degree from the University of Warsaw, Faculty of History. He has been studying also law.

He was working as a high school teacher and as a specialist at the Ministry of Culture and National Heritage, as well as at the Polish Information Agency and as a historian at the Institute of National Remembrance and at the Museum of John Paul II and Primate Wyszyński.

In 2016, he was nominated ambassador to the Holy See, accredited also to the Sovereign Military Order of Malta. He presented his credentials to Pope Francis on 23 June 2016. He ended his term on 15 May 2022.

He is married.

== Works ==
- Polacy w ZSRR 1917–1947 (co-author), Warszawa 1990
- Wiersze, Warszawa 1991
- Krym i inne wiersze, Kraków 1993
- 44 wiersze, Warszawa 1999
- Ksiądz Jerzy Popiełuszko, Warszawa 2004, 2010
- Kropla, Warszawa 2006
- Czas przemian 1979–1989. Znaczenie pierwszych trzech pielgrzymek Jana Pawła II do Ojczyzny, Warszawa 2010
- Nic niemożliwego, Warszawa 2011
- Prymas Stefan Wyszyński w służbie Bogu, człowiekowi i narodowi, Warszawa 2011
- Głos, Warszawa: Fronda PL 2014
