= Henryk Cederbaum =

Polish lawyer (1863–1928)

Henryk Cederbaum (1863–1928) was a Polish lawyer and one of the noted members of Warsaw's bar in the early 20th century.

Already before World War I, when Congress Poland was under Imperial Russian control, he gained much fame as one of the "unhumble" lawyers: prosecuting and defending in trials where Polish people were victims and Russians were offenders. One of the best known was the trial of Aleksandr Barteniev, a Russian military officer who murdered his Polish lover, a noted dramatic actress Maria Wisnowska in 1890. The Varshavskiy Dnevnik, the official Russian-language newspaper published by the tsarist authorities, noted that - despite the official ban on usage of the Polish language in public - Cederbaum spoke very bad Russian and was apparently very proud of it. The case was later fictionalised by, among others, Ivan Bunin in his 1925 novella Case of Lieutenant Yelagin.

Another well-known and widely discussed case was the trial of Maria Gurko, the wife of Russian governor-general of Poland Iosif Gurko. She was well-known to Warsaw's shopkeepers for never paying for the clothes and jewellery she ordered. However, in 1892 one of the shopkeepers in a silk store called the police. The governor's wife was set free while the shopkeeper was sentenced to three months in prison for "offending the higher authorities." For his skilful yet unsuccessful defense of the shopkeeper, Cederbaum was expelled from the bar and sentenced to five years without the right of appearing in court.

During his banishment from the bar, Cederbaum authored a number of legal handbooks for ordinary people, among them a guide on writing last wills and testaments. After the Russian withdrawal from Warsaw in 1915, during World War I, Cederbaum wrote a number of articles as well as a lengthy study on the Russian reprisals against the civilian population during the January Uprising against Russian rule in Poland. He also became one of the key members of the so-called "Delegation of Warsaw's Solicitors" (Delegatura Adwokatury Warszawskiej), a body formed by some of the most renowned members of the Warsaw bar for creation of a new penal code for the future Republic of Poland. The documents prepared by the Delegation became the core of what, on 1 January 1919, was passed as the Decree on Temporary Statute of Lawyers for the Polish State, the main legal document regarding the status and duties of lawyers in Poland until mid-1930s.
