= Krzysztof Pusz =

Polish politician and lawyer

Krzysztof Zbigniew Pusz (born 21 June 1951 in Gdańsk) is a Polish politician and lawyer.

A graduate of the University of Gdańsk, he was involved in the Solidarity movement since its beginnings. He was an organizer of the Interim Coordination Commission of Solidarity. Later he was a secretary in the Solidarity's leader, Lech Wałęsa, office.

Pusz became a director of the Central Solidarity Office and served in this position in 1989.

When Wałęsa was elected President in 1990, Pusz was appointed a minister of state in the Office of the President and became Chief of Presidential Cabinet. He served this position from 22 December 1990 (a day Wałęsa took office) until 29 October 1991, when he was replaced by Mieczysław Wachowski.

Following this, Pusz retired from the active politics and dedicated himself to business. He, however, back when he was named deputy Voivode of the Gdańsk Voivodeship, and later after municipal reform, Pomeranian Voivodeship. He served as a deputy of the voivode from 1998 to 2001.

A longtime member of the centrist Freedom Union, he was a regional leader of this party from 2001 and, after the creation of the Democratic Party – demokraci.pl.

He ran for the President (Mayor) of Gdańsk in 2006 on the ballot of the Left and the Democrats (A coalition of Democratic Party, Democratic Left Alliance, Labour Union and Social Democracy of Poland (SdPl).

He remained a close friend of former President Wałęsa.

During his later career as entrepreneur, he was a president of Port Service, a hazardous waste disposal firm situated in Gdańsk. In 2015 he was put to a trial after an investigation by the prosecutor which showed some grave abuse by the firm when dealing with toxic soil that contained Hexachlorobenzene. It was first stored very close to the waterfront of a nearby located Gdańsk Bay in a bunch of bags that leaked brown liquid. Then contaminated soil was handed over to another firm that simply put it in the ground not knowing the real nature of it as the documents provided by Port Service named it as non-threatening to the environment. Later investigation showed that it was potentially harmful for local soil and water. This story had some impact in Polish media, both local and big outlets.
