= Stanisław Iwanicki =

Polish lawyer and politician

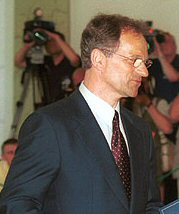
Stanisław Iwanicki

Stanisław Iwanicki (born 5 March 1951, in Biała Podlaska) is a Polish lawyer and politician.

From 1991 to 1995 he served as a deputy Attorney General (position joint with Minister of Justice). He became chief of the Office of the President of the Republic of Poland under President Lech Wałęsa, position he held from 21 August to 22 December 1995. He was the last chief of Wałęsa's presidential office and left office with him.

Iwanicki returned to the active politics, when he was elected to the Sejm from Solidarity Electoral Action in 1997. He was a Sejm Member until 2001.

He also was appointed Minister of Justice by Prime Minister Jerzy Buzek, took office on 5 July 2001 and served until 19 October 2007.
