= Władysław Szczepkowski =

Polish lawyer (born 1966)

Władysław Szczepkowski (born July 9, 1966 at Olsztyn, Poland) is a Polish lawyer.

He studied at the Nicolaus Copernicus University in Toruń, Poland. Before working for PKP Cargo he was director of the law department of the Cetelem Bank in Poland. He is the current president, and former CEO of PKP Cargo.
