= Jolanta Szymanek-Deresz =

Polish lawyer and politician (1954–2010)

Member of the Sejm
- In office 25 September 2005 – 10 April 2010
- Constituency: 16 – Płock

Personal details
- Born: 12 July 1954 Przedbórz, Poland
- Died: 10 April 2010 (aged 55) Smolensk, Russia
- Party: Democratic Left Alliance

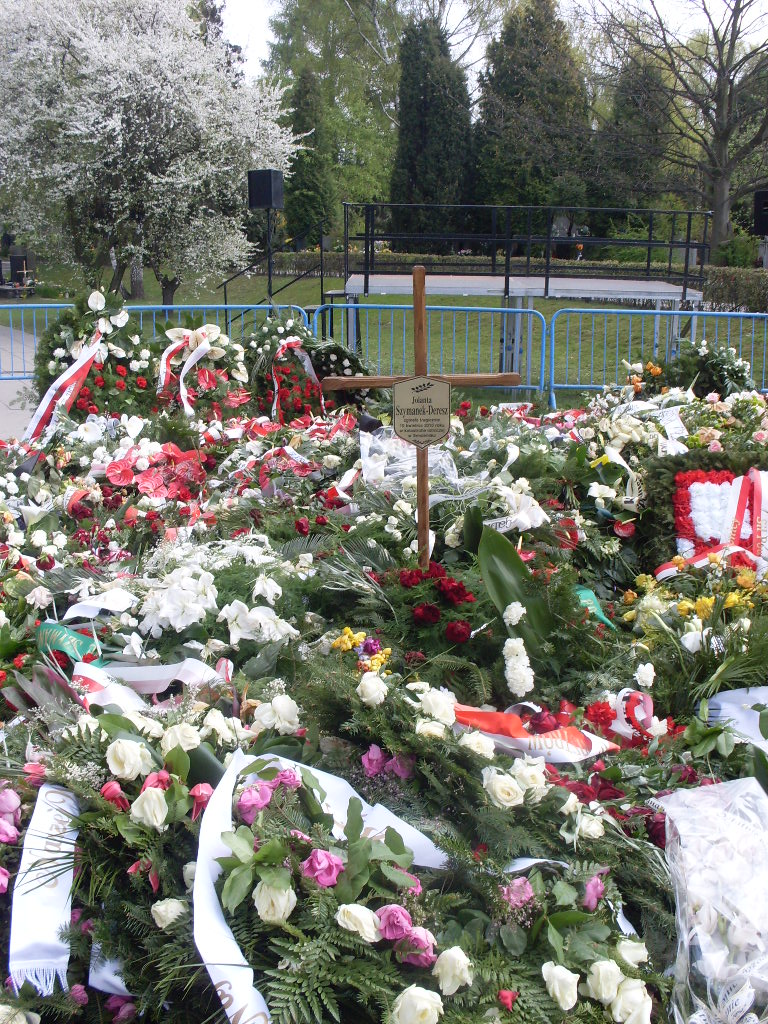
Grave of Jolanta Szymanek-Deresz at Military Powązki Cemetery (after burial)

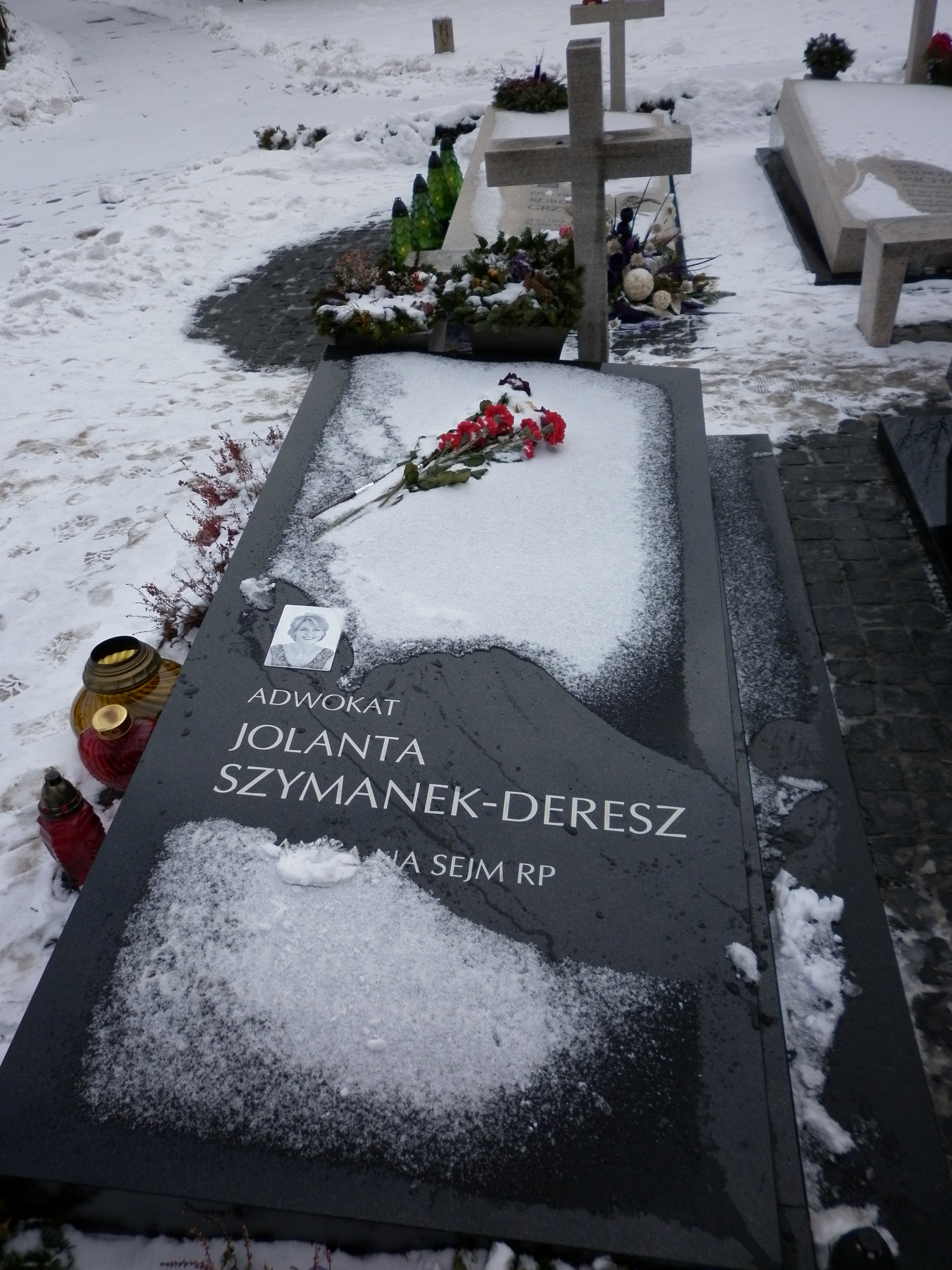
Grave of Jolanta Szymanek-Deresz at Military Powązki Cemetery

Jolanta Dorota Szymanek-Deresz (pronounced [jɔˈlanta dɔˈrɔta ʂɨˈmanɛɡ ˈdɛrɛʂ]; 12 July 1954 – 10 April 2010) was a Polish lawyer and politician.

== Biography ==
She graduated from the 21st Secondary School of General Education named after Bolesław Prus in Łódź. Initially, she studied at the University of Łódź but transferred to Warsaw after two years. In 1977, she completed her studies at the Faculty of Law and Administration of the University of Warsaw. After completing her judicial apprenticeship, she worked at the District Court for the Capital City of Warsaw. In 1987, after passing the bar exam, she began working in a law firm. From 1996, she was a member of an international organization dealing with competition law.

From 1979 to 1990, she was a member of the Polish United Workers' Party (PZPR). Since 3 January 2000, she held the position of Undersecretary of State in the Chancellery of the President of the Republic of Poland, and from 13 June 2000, she served as the Head of the Chancellery of the President. On 23 December 2000, she was reappointed to this position for the second term of Aleksander Kwaśniewski, holding it until 18 October 2005. During her tenure, she was awarded the Estonian Order of the White Star, 1st Class (2002).

In the 2005 parliamentary elections, she was elected for the first time as a member of the Sejm for the 5th term from the Płock constituency on the SLD list. In the 2007 parliamentary elections, she was elected for the second time, running on the list of the Left and Democrats coalition and receiving 20,536 votes. From 22 April 2008, she sat in the parliamentary club of the Left. On 1 June 2008, she became the Deputy Chairperson of the SLD. In 2009, she unsuccessfully ran for the European Parliament.

She died on 10 April 2010 in Smolensk air disaster while en route to the 70th anniversary of the Katyn massacre. On 19 April 2010, she was buried in the Smolensk Quarter at the Powązki Military Cemetery in Warsaw.

== Awards and commemoration ==
On 16 April 2010, she was posthumously awarded the Commander's Cross with Star of the Order of the Rebirth of Poland.

In September 2010, the City Council of Płock granted Jolanta Szymanek-Deresz the title of Honorary Citizen of the City.

On 16 November 2010, a commemorative plaque dedicated to Jolanta Szymanek-Deresz was unveiled at 27 Stary Rynek in Płock; on the same day, another commemorative plaque in her honor was unveiled at 31 Wyzwolenia Street in Żuromin. On 4 April 2012, a commemorative plaque honoring the four victims of the Smolensk disaster from the legal community, including Jolanta Szymanek-Deresz, was unveiled on the building of the Supreme Bar Council at 16 Świętojerska Street in Warsaw.

== See also ==
- Members of Polish Sejm 2005–2007
