= Mieczysław Wachowski =

Polish politician

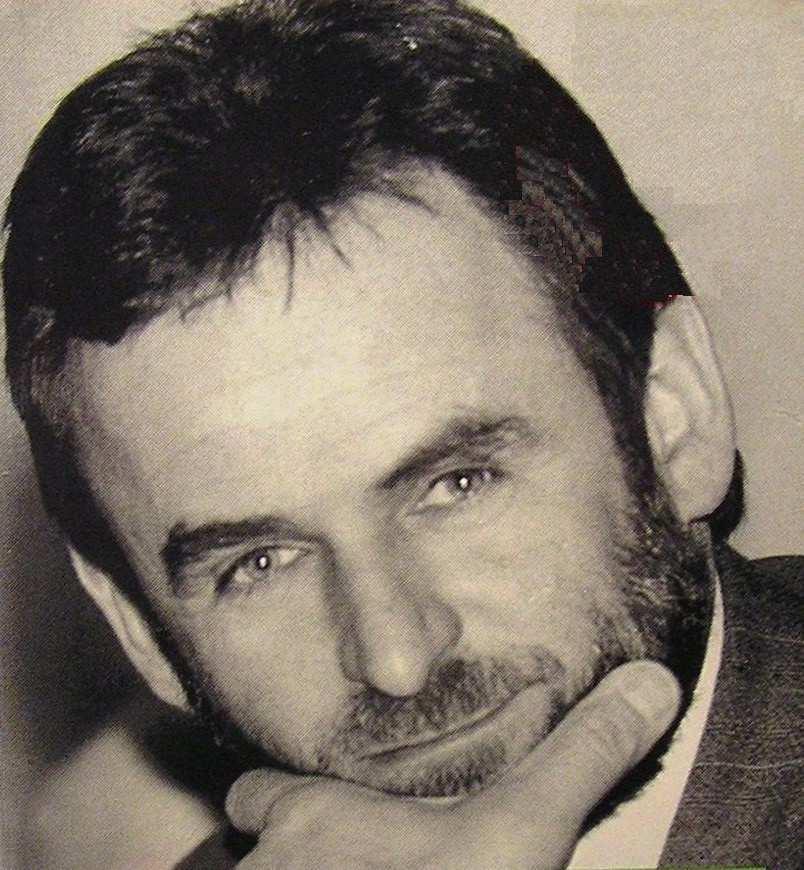
Mieczysław Wachowski, ca. 1990

Mieczysław Wachowski (born 21 December 1950) is a Polish politician. He was a minister of state, and close friend and aide of Lech Wałęsa. Before he became a minister of state, he had been a taxi driver, who voluntarily wanted to drive Wałęsa. He was rumored to be a Secret Police (SB) officer (1980).
