= Schody =

Studio album by the Polish band Perfect

Studio album by Perfect
- Released: 1 April 2004 (Interia); 20 December 2004 (CD + LP)
- Recorded: 2001
- Genre: Rock
- Length: 46:50
- Language: Polish
- Label: Universal Music Polska
- Producer: Dariusz Kozakiewicz, Bogdan Olewicz

Perfect chronology
Śmigło (1999)	Schody (2004)	XXX (2010)

Schody (English: Stairs) is the sixth studio album by the band Perfect, released on 1 April 2004 in a digital version (paid MP3 files) through the portal Interia.pl. It was officially released by Universal Music Polska in CD and LP formats in the autumn of the same year. It is the first album in the history of Polish popular music to be originally released in a digital format.

The album's release was delayed due to the promotion and release of the compilation Perfect Symfonicznie. The band's vocalist, Grzegorz Markowski, cited the fight against widespread music piracy and theft as a reason for the digital release, as well as enabling broader access for listeners, including those living abroad: "This is a step towards internet users. Poland has lagged behind a bit when it comes to selling music this way. I think it's significant for people living outside big cities or abroad". The band initially sent tracks via email as a gift, eventually developing the idea of releasing the album online.

By the end of March 2005, the album had been downloaded approximately 7,000 times from Interia.pl; it is estimated to have sold around 10,000 copies in total.

== Background, recording, and production ==
According to Grzegorz Markowski in an interview, the material for the album was recorded between 2001 and 2002, with its release postponed due to the composition and promotion of Perfect Symfonicznie. The idea for the album came from Bogdan Olewicz, who wrote the lyrics for all the tracks. In an interview with Super Express in early January 2003, Markowski confirmed that the material was nearly complete, with a tentative release planned for February 2003.

In spring 2003, Netia SA approached the band with a sponsorship offer for the album, proposing the title 1055; additionally, a track titled K2 was planned, dedicated to the members of the Polish Netia K2 Winter Expedition. On 3 July, the band performed at the TOPtrendy festival at the Forest Opera in Sopot. On 21 September, they participated in the Dla Kawy concert, dedicated to the late Jerzy Kawalec, who had died two weeks earlier. On 13 October, the band performed on the roof of a building near Roman Dmowski Roundabout in Warsaw, inspired by The Beatles' 1969 rooftop concert; after playing a few songs, they were removed by police, and Markowski was detained for an hour. Later that year, the band performed in New York for the Polish diaspora. Meanwhile, a reissue of the album Katowice Spodek Live ’94 debuted at number 37 on the OLiS chart. The recording was co-financed by the authorities of Ruda Śląska; Andrzej Urny called it the band's best concert, while Markowski noted: "I wanted to see what had changed in ten years. In terms of the aesthetics of playing the same songs (...) I was pleased to find we stayed true to what we were (...) I had some reservations about the vocals... (...) Everything else in these songs is as it should be. There's that authenticity".

In March 2004, Markowski participated in a Warsaw meeting of fans and friends of Czesław Niemen; in an interview with Info Tips, he stated that the music on the album differed stylistically from mainstream radio. Days before the official release, the band held a press conference at the Stodoła Club, answering questions and premiering five new tracks.

== Release and reception ==
Release date	Label	Format	Catalog number
20 December 2004	Universal Music Polska	CD	986 977 9
20 December 2004	Universal Music Polska	LP	986 980 2

The album was made available for purchase online on 1 April 2004 at 7:00 PM exclusively through Interia.pl. It was sold in two formats: as a complete album (priced at 15 PLN) or individual tracks (3 PLN each). A PDF file with colorful artwork, including lyrics and band photos, was included. It was the first album in Polish music history to be released primarily online. On the release day, the band performed at Stodoła Club in Warsaw, supported by Bohema.

On 2 April, the band participated in a chat on Interia, debunking rumors spread by manager Adam Galas that the Stodoła concert was their last. They announced that the concert was recorded and would be released on DVD later that year, included with a limited CD edition released in late 2004.

In April, the band embarked on a nationwide tour, including cities like Mielec, Warsaw, Krosno, Ciechanów, Suwałki, and Kraków. On 20 May, Perfect received an award during World Communications Day for "promoting the internet by releasing Poland's first album distributed exclusively online as MP3 files". During the gala, they performed Kołysanka dla nieznajomej (Lullaby for a Stranger); manager Adam Galas noted: "The entire telecommunications industry congratulated us, and we dedicate the award to everyone who deserved it. (...) We recorded well over 100,000 visits to our album's page, with hundreds visiting daily. Sales met our expectations". On 11 July, they performed at the Węgorzewo Rock Festival alongside TSA, Agnieszka Chylińska, Püdelsi, Łzy, and Myslovitz. In late July, they played in Łódź to celebrate the launch of Złote Przeboje radio. On 13 October, Jacek Krzaklewski released his solo album Dużo kurzu (Lots of Dust), recorded during the promotion of Schody. On 19 October, the band performed at Warsaw's Proxima club in a charity concert for victims of the Beslan school siege, showcasing new material. On 31 October, they played in Bochum, marking the international leg of their tour, performing new tracks and concert staples. On 27 November, Perfect performed with Maanam and Skangur in Kraków in solidarity with the Ukrainian people. Jacek Majchrowski stated: "This concert is a symbol of our solidarity with the Ukrainian nation". The next day, alongside Piersi and Edyta Górniak, they performed at Maidan Nezalezhnosti in Kyiv. On 31 December, they played a New Year's Eve concert in Poznań, split into two parts to highlight the new album.

== Chart performance ==
The album did not appear on any official Polish charts – OLiS, Program 3 Chart, or Szczecin Chart. The only single, EM, released in 2004 via Universal Music Polska, also failed to chart.

== Track listing ==
All tracks were produced by Dariusz Kozakiewicz, with lyrics by Bogdan Olewicz.

=== CD and digital edition ===
1. Perfect Show & Hip Top Band part I (00:42)
2. Taki jestem (That's How I Am) (03:27)
3. EM (05:10)
4. Kainowe pokolenie (Cain's Generation) (06:39)
5. Wieczny dylemat (Eternal Dilemma) (03:17)
6. Jeżeli chcesz nas zaskoczyć (If You Want to Surprise Us) (03:26)
7. Jesteś jak wirus (You're Like a Virus) (03:18)
8. Kto dziś przygarnie mnie (Who Will Take Me In Today) (04:32)
9. Strzelec wyborowy (Sharpshooter) (05:52)
10. Nad rozlanym mlekiem (Over Spilled Milk) (03:57)
11. Schody (Stairs) (03:13)
12. Urodziłem się nie do pary (I Was Born Out of Pair) (04:21)
13. Perfect Show & Hip Top Band part II (03:28)

=== Vinyl edition ===
- Side A:
1. Perfect Show & Hip Top Band part I (00:42)
2. Taki jestem (That's How I Am) (03:27)
3. EM (05:10)
4. Kainowe pokolenie (Cain's Generation) (06:39)
5. Wieczny dylemat (Eternal Dilemma) (03:17)
- Side B:
1. Jesteś jak wirus (You're Like a Virus) (03:18)
2. Strzelec wyborowy (Sharpshooter) (05:52)
3. Schody (Stairs) (03:13)
4. Urodziłem się nie do pary (I Was Born Out of Pair) (03:25)
5. Perfect Show & Hip Top Band part II (03:28)

== Personnel ==
- Grzegorz Markowski – vocals
- Dariusz Kozakiewicz – guitar, rhythm guitar, backing vocals
- Jacek Krzaklewski – guitar
- Piotr Szkudelski – drums
- Piotr Urbanek – bass guitar
- Tomasz Butryn – keyboard, Hammond organ
- Michał Jelonek – violin
- Andrzej Karp – backing vocals, loops
