= Perfect Symfonicznie =

Compilation album by the Polish band Perfect

Compilation album by Perfect
- Released: November 12, 2002
- Recorded: June–November 2001
- Genre: rock, progressive rock, album-oriented rock
- Length: 1:04:40
- Label: Polskie Radio
- Producer: Universal Music Polska

Perfect chronology
Solidex (2000)	Perfect Symfonicznie (2002)	Perfect dla Polpharmy (2004)

Perfect Symfonicznie is the 10th compilation album by the band Perfect, released on 12 November 2002 by Polskie Radio. The album features new arrangements of Perfect's existing songs (performed with the Polish Radio Symphony Orchestra), including one new track, Kto dziś przygarnie mnie, which also appeared on the 2004 album Schody. The album sold over 50,000 copies, achieving platinum status, and the band was nominated for a Fryderyk award. The arrangements were created by Wojciech Karolak, Adam Sztaba, Jan Kanty Pawluśkiewicz, Grzegorz Piotrowski, Wojciech Zieliński, Piotr Siejka, and Paweł Betley.

The album received mixed reviews in the Polish market. While Łukasz Wewiór from Teraz Rock praised the arrangements as "very reasonable", critic Robert Leszczyński questioned the band's credibility and originality, accusing them of commercialism.

Perfect Symfonicznie reached the 16th spot on the OLiS chart.

On 20 October 2007, a reissue of the album titled Perfect Symfonicznie – Platinum was released, featuring the same arrangements of the songs. This edition included a previously unreleased track, Póki mam jeden sen.

On 19 October 2009, a DVD was released featuring a recording of a concert at the Centennial Hall in Wrocław from April 26 of the same year, performed with the Wrocław Philharmonic Orchestra named after Witold Lutosławski. The album achieved gold status on the day of its release.

== Context ==
In 2000, a long-awaited Perfect concert, originally announced in 1987, was supposed to take place, with tickets being sold at the Stodoła Club in Warsaw. The performance did not occur due to the band members' family issues and significant lineup changes since 2000 (leader of the band, Grzegorz Markowski, mentioned in an interview that the ticket proceeds were donated to a foundation supporting aspiring musicians and that he attempted to contact the guitarist, Zbigniew Hołdys, about the concert, but he refused to speak with him). Throughout 2000, the band remained in conflict with Zbigniew Hołdys, and attempts to organize a joint concert were unsuccessful. Grzegorz Markowski stated:

I called Zbyszek (...), suggested a meeting. He was playing at Stodoła on December 19, and we wanted to play there on the same day, but he refused. He didn’t want to meet or talk. I wanted to face him, go to his shop, shake hands, and have a conversation, as it was our mutual obligation, and we should do it. He gave a vague excuse that two members had indeed left (...). I wanted to see it through to the end. We had an idea to do it in Bemowo or Służewiec in the summer with substantial funding, but the sponsor backed out after three months of talks. After all this, we wanted to play in any format that Zbyszek proposed, but he simply refused. I see a bit of spite in this. We wanted to play the concert a bit earlier, on December 13, on the anniversary of Martial Law. However, the club manager said that Zbyszek Hołdys had already booked Stodoła for the 19th, so we should ask him if he wanted us to play a week earlier. Zbyszek also refused this.

On 1 January 2001, Perfect released Live 2001, containing archival recordings of three concerts performed by the band in late autumn 1999. The producer was Adrian Drabiński. The album featured an unconventional structure – in addition to live-recorded tracks, it included several unedited monologues by Grzegorz Markowski. The album was the first in Polish music history to be released in Dolby Pro Logic standard. Live 2001 was a modest commercial success and did not chart in Poland. Bass guitarist, Piotr Urbanek, explained the situation: It’s known what people want. Especially some people. They want the old stuff, and that’s probably why it happened. Due to the album’s poor sales, Markowski stated in an interview that he intended to remain an active musician for only the next five years.

The idea to record an album with a symphony orchestra was first proposed by the band’s manager, Adam Galas, at the end of 2000. The proposal was presented to several Polish record companies, including Universal Music Polska, but the vision was rejected. In 2003, Markowski tried to explain the situation in an interview, citing his authenticity and disdain for digital sound correction: I know the world has changed, that music has changed too, and I know that with my love for authenticity, I am archaic. In March 2001, the director of the Advertising and Phonography Office of Polskie Radio contacted Galas with the proposal to record interpretations of Perfect’s songs with the accompaniment of the Polish Radio Symphony Orchestra. Galas later revealed: I was surprised. None of our previous initiatives had worked out. But here... we agreed.

== Recording and production ==
The band began recording in early June 2001. The recordings took place at the Witold Lutosławski Concert Studio of Polskie Radio (59 Modzelewski Street in Warsaw, now 59 Kaczmarski Street) and the Agnieszka Osiecka Concert Studio (3/5/7 Myśliwiecka Street). The entire material was recorded in two sessions, with Wiesław Pieregorólka as the main producer. The first song recorded, on the first day, was Niewiele Ci mogę dać; guitarist Dariusz Kozakiewicz said: It’s a song I thought I knew, yet in this version, it sounds like something new. It’s like dressing a woman. You can dress her in different outfits, and each time she looks completely different. It’s the same with a song. Markowski also revealed that this is his favorite track from the album. Wiesław Pieregorólka stated:

I worked on this album with Perfect more for professional reasons than sentimental ones. However, I have a favorite: the track 'Niepokonani', which is absolutely unique. I've been friends with Perfect for many years, but I’m not a fan. When familiarizing myself with the songs selected for the album, I realized I didn’t know many of them... Perfect interests me more in terms of professionalism; I highly respect their work and the fact that they've managed to stay on top for so many years.

First, the band's instrumental parts were recorded, followed by the compilation of material with the Symphony Orchestra's backing, and finally, Markowski's vocal parts were added. The last parts to be recorded were the solo sections – Szkudelski's percussion and Kozakiewicz's guitar. Several specialists, including Adam Sztaba, Wojciech Zieliński, and Grzegorz Piotrowski, were hired to create the arrangements. Markowski saw this diversity as the source of the recording's uniqueness and originality: If these arrangements had been written by one person, our album might have been a bit boring. I suspect it wouldn’t have had such a musical spectacle with its own dramaturgy and various tensions. Dariusz Kozakiewicz commented:

Recording in the studio wasn’t a problem because we just laid down our tracks. Later, each arranger added their arrangements. That was manageable, but then the proposal came to perform a series of concerts, and that was a huge challenge.

The only fully instrumental track, In an integration and an adoration, was composed by Wojciech Zieliński during the first recording session. Łukasz Wewiór wrote about the track that it resembles a sound illustration... of a battle scene. Niepokonani, a track that Kozakiewicz believed the orchestra adds extra colors to, was recorded last. Conversely, Chcemy być sobą, the song promoting the album, was judged by many critics as the worst of the presented material. Piotr Szkudelski stated:

These are incredible technical challenges. How to amplify it well? An orchestra consists of dozens of people and rather quiet acoustic instruments. Each must have a microphone that adequately carries the sound. There can't be any glitches...

On 30 October 2001, Perfect performed a concert with the Polish Radio Symphony Orchestra at Warsaw’s Arena COS Torwar, where they presented the first versions of the song arrangements. In February 2002, Perfect participated in an online chat organized by the internet service Onet.pl and the magazine Tylko Rock. Markowski revealed plans for the album’s release and confirmed his participation in his daughter’s debut solo album, Będę silna. In the meantime, Perfect publicly released the first teaser of the album Schody under the name 1055, due to a brief sponsorship takeover by Netia. The group also recorded a track titled K2, dedicated to the Polish Winter Expedition Netia K2 team, which attempted to climb the K2 peak in the 2002/2003 season.

== Release and promotion ==
Release date	Label	Format	Catalog number
12 November 2002	Polskie Radio	CD	PRCD 266
2002	Polskie Radio	Cassette	
2002	Universal Music Polska	CD	4811290

Perfect Symfonicznie was released on 12 November 2002. The delay from the originally planned release date in the spring of 2002 was due to difficulties in securing a sponsor. Markowski explained:

The problem was finding a sponsor. Even Polskie Radio tried to find the money, but... you know how it is here. It’s tough. And since two or three other bands recently talked about a symphonic album project, we decided to beat them to it and release it without a sponsor... Eventually, although the album isn't cheerful, we found a sponsor – Netia...

In Poland, the album was released with colorful artwork that included a detailed list of songs (with lyrics and music credits), images of the band members, biographies of the arrangers, and a condensed history of Perfect and the Polish Radio Symphony Orchestra. The album was distributed across Europe through Universal Music Group. The album's graphic design was created by Elżbieta Banecka (hand-drawn illustrations) and Krzysztof Konopelski (design), while the photos of the musicians and arrangers were taken by Banecka, Jan Bebel, Piotr Grześczyk, Szymon Kobusiński, Katarzyna Pysiak, and Joanna Siedlar.

In early December 2002, the album achieved platinum status. In early 2003, Perfect Symfonicznie was nominated for the Fryderyk award in the Album of the Year – Rock category. The nomination of Perfect, along with several lesser-known or "washed-up" bands, led the Nuta.pl service to call the event "socially harmful".

Shortly after the album’s release, the group embarked on a brief concert tour, performing in venues such as the Congress Hall and in Poznań. In June 2003, the band played a charity concert in front of the Municipal Cultural Center in Mińsk Mazowiecki. On October 13, the band held a rooftop concert on a building near the Roman Dmowski roundabout in Warsaw, inspired by a similar event by The Beatles in 1969. After playing a few songs, the band was removed from the roof by police officers and had their identities checked, with Markowski being detained and released from the station after an hour-long interrogation.

== Reception by critics ==
A comprehensive review of Perfect Symfonicznie was published in 2003 by Teraz Rock. Łukasz Wewiór wrote:

I think it is not necessary to repeat once again that Grzegorz Markowski is like wine (the older he gets, the better vocalist he becomes), that Dariusz Kozakiewicz is an excellent guitarist and proves it again. I will risk a strange statement. Whatever the musicians' inspirations were, it worked!

The album also received favorable reviews from Marcin Cichoński, an expert from cgm.pl, who highlighted the seamless transition from rock parts to pleasant symphonic sounds. The critic stated that the slower, the better, and selected Gdy mówię jestem, Niewiele Ci mogę dać, and Idź precz as the best tracks. The band and the album were criticized by Robert Leszczyński. The critic accused the band of commercialism and the tendency to sell the same material repeatedly, as well as laziness in recording new albums (Instead of composing a new album, the band records the same well-known songs). Leszczyński also negatively assessed the album's composition, noting the lack of opportunity for the arrangers to "spread their wings". He suspected that the arrangers could have transformed the album's character:

Each of them [the arrangers] could only add a few instruments to the ready-made rock arrangement. There is no doubt that creators like Jan Kanty Pawluśkiewicz could 'turn the arrangement inside out', free the song from its rock rawness, and bring out its beauty and atmosphere using different means. Unfortunately, he couldn't do much because the basic idea of the album was 'not to change'.

The journalist also noted the lack of originality in the recording: Recording songs with the participation of an orchestra should result in some artistic quality, not a simple sum of the band's and the orchestra's sounds.

== Perfect Symfonicznie – Platinum ==
Perfect Symfonicznie – Platinum is the 12th compilation album by Perfect, released on 20 November 2007 in Poland through Polskie Radio. The album is an official reissue of Perfect Symfonicznie, released to celebrate the significant sales success of the original album. It features unchanged arrangements of Perfect's existing songs (performed with the Polish Radio Symphony Orchestra), along with one new track, Póki mam jeden sen. The album was released in a limited edition.

The original arrangers' projects from Perfect Symfonicznie were preserved. According to Polskie Radio's official website, the tracks remained unchanged but gained new sound and expression. The track Póki mam jeden sen was released in its originally recorded version by Perfect.

=== Context ===
At the end of February 2007, Perfect performed at the Rock Arena festival in Gorzów Wielkopolski alongside musicians like Marek Piekarczyk and Robert Brylewski. Głos Wielkopolski commented on the performance:

Perfectly clear sound, great performance, and many emotions when 'Autobiografia', 'Ale wkoło jest wesoło', or 'Chcemy być sobą' flowed from the stage. 'We are strong with your strength' – Grzegorz Markowski said goodbye around 1 am and indeed left the stage undefeated.

On 4 March 2007, Tadeusz Nalepa, a longtime member of the band Breakout, which included Dariusz Kozakiewicz, passed away. Kozakiewicz said of Nalepa: He was my friend (...) and idol.

In mid-March, the band performed in London – Markowski said: I am looking forward to visiting London because it is a beautiful city. (...) London is one of the most well-maintained cities in the world – maybe alongside Vienna or Prague.

On April 11, Perfect performed with Patrycja Markowska at the Stodoła Club in Warsaw, and the concert recording was included in Perfect's premiere DVD Z wtorku na środę.

In mid-June, Perfect participated in the Seweryn Krajewski Song Festival – Markowski sang the song Nie zadzieraj nosa.

=== Release ===
The album was released on 20 October 2007 exclusively in Poland. It was released in a limited edition and promoted almost exclusively by Polskie Radio. The album came with colorful graphics identical to those included with Perfect Symfonicznie. Shortly after its release, Perfect performed a series of concerts across Poland with the Polish Radio Symphony Orchestra, including two performances at the Congress Hall in Warsaw on October 10 and December 20.

Grzegorz Markowski expressed his joy about the full Congress Hall:

I was very happy with the full Congress Hall because it is not easy today in Warsaw to fill the Congress Hall, which seats 3,500. There are so many free sponsored concerts that people are reluctant to buy tickets. And I was worried – I knew by noon that over 2,000 tickets had been sold; there were still about one and a half thousand to go to a full house. And when the Polish Radio musicians played the introduction starting the concert (and the album), I stuck my head out from behind the scenes, looked, and saw it was full, I was just happy and very fulfilled.

The album contains unchanged versions of the tracks from Perfect Symfonicznie and includes the song Póki mam jeden sen, recorded specifically for the album. Markowski revealed in an interview that the training period for the song lasted over three hours at a time. The song was broadcast in October 2007 by Polskie Radio. Despite the album being released only in Poland, the band played several concerts in the United States – Los Angeles and New York. Asked about the idea of releasing a reissue of the symphonic album, Markowski said:

This is a big undertaking. It's partly about money – I know that a few bands had the same idea. We recorded and released this album with the participation and co-production of Polskie Radio, so initially, logistically and financially; if we had executed such a plan, it would have been several hundred thousand PLN at the start. You need to gather arrangers, the orchestra, the studio, then mix it... And the question mark – will it sell? Unfortunately, today the market is driven by money. In our case – and we invited great arrangers to collaborate – because Jan Kanty Pawluśkiewicz, Wojtek Zieliński, Wojtek Karolak, Adaś Sztaba – and they did these works so fantastically that there was no need for extensive promotion on the radio. The album appeared on the market, fragments of various tracks were played, such a little advertisement for this album (and 'Perfect Symfonicznie' sold almost 50,000 copies in five years).

In interviews, Markowski emphasized the need for perfect synchronization between the orchestra and the band during concerts, where it is possible to deviate from the rhythm, make mistakes in playing, or extend a chord. The vocalist stated that the tracks gained originality through the combination of the existing sound with the orchestra: Some tracks gained a lot. Some less..., but I think they all gained.

=== Aftermath ===
Just over two weeks before the release of Perfect Symfonicznie – Platinum, a promotional compilation album Perfect – Trójka Live was released, attached to an issue of the newspaper Rzeczpospolita. The album contains a recording of the concert for Children's Day performed by Perfect in Warsaw on 1 June 2001. The recording includes two announcements by Marek Niedźwiecki – often reprinted in newspapers was the opening announcement of the album: When Perfect performs on Trójka, it is always a holiday!

On 20 November 2007, the recording Z wtorku na środę achieved gold status in Poland. Shortly after the album's release, the band suspended its activities for a few weeks, related to Patrycja Markowska's pregnancy and childbirth. From the end of December 2007, the group played several concerts with the Polish Radio Symphony Orchestra (including at the Congress Hall and in Gdańsk). In autumn 2007, it was announced to the public that the internet-released album Schody sold 15,000 copies. In 2008, as part of a concert tour promoting the album, the band performed several shows across Poland, including at the National Philharmonic, the Polish Baltic Philharmonic, and Opera Nova.

== DVD ==
On 19 October 2009, Perfect released a live version of the album with a recording of the concert held on 26 April 2009 at the Centennial Hall in Wrocław. The album was recorded with the participation of the Witold Lutosławski Wrocław Philharmonic Orchestra (conducted by Wojciech Zieliński). The project coordinator was Emilia Siepkowska, and the concert director was Grzegorz Kupiec. The musician photos included in the color graphics of the album were taken by Marta Tłuszcz, who also did photos for the booklet of Vader's album And Blood Was Shed in Warsaw. In addition to the graphics, the album in both formats included an interview with Grzegorz Markowski (conducted by Dariusz Świtała from Metal Hammer magazine), the band's biography and discography, a photo gallery, desktop wallpapers, and web links with licensed materials about the band.

Release date	Label	Format	Catalog number
19 October 2009	Metal Mind Productions	DVD	MMP DVD 0192
19 October 2009	Metal Mind Productions	2 CD + DVD	MMP DVD 0193
19 October 2009	Metal Mind Productions	2 CD	MMP CD 0673 DGD

Initially, the album's release date was announced as October 19, but the band announced that the album would be available two days earlier during their concert at the Congress Hall. Ultimately, the album was officially released by Metal Mind Productions on October 17, premiering at the band's concert. On the day of release, the album achieved gold status (Perfect received the award during the performance). The concert was hosted by Marek Niedźwiecki, considered the originator of the project. Regarding the concert in Warsaw, Michał Bigoraj from Teraz Rock magazine wrote:

The audience, filling the Congress Hall to the brim, heard (...) songs such as: 'Idź precz', 'Ale wkoło jest wesoło', 'Chcemy być sobą', 'Kołysanka dla nieznajomej', 'Niewiele ci mogę dać' or 'Niepokonani'. Listening to these slower, calmer songs, one could best notice the changed arrangement and the participation of the orchestra. The string instruments, often used by bands in rock music, were in the foreground. The songs performed during the concert should be more elaborate and longer than their original versions. There should also be more instrumental parts. (...) The band's hits (...) sounded extremely dignified.

The album reached 16th place on the OLiS chart and stayed there for three weeks. The release was 67th on the list of the best-selling albums in Poland in December 2009. The recordings achieved gold DVD status.

A concert tour across Poland consisting of 10 concerts was announced, including a jubilee performance at Spodek in Katowice on 13 March 2010, celebrating the band's 30th anniversary. In an interview with Teraz Rock, Grzegorz Markowski said that he plans to release a new studio album with Perfect in 2010, with recordings starting right after the concerts with the symphony orchestra; by September 2009, the band had recorded five new songs.

=== Tracklist ===
The CD and DVD contain the same tracks, with the CD containing only the audio recording of the concert.

#	Track	Length	Lyrics	Music
1	In an integration and an adoration	2:04	–	Wojciech Zieliński
2	Autobiografia	4:34	Bogdan Olewicz	Zbigniew Hołdys
3	Nie raz nie dwa	3:20	Bogdan Olewicz	Grzegorz Markowski
4	Idź precz	3:41	Bogdan Olewicz	Zbigniew Hołdys
5	Gdy mówię jestem	6:16	Bogdan Olewicz	Ryszard Sygitowicz, Andrzej Nowicki, Jacek Krzaklewski, Piotr Szkudelski
6	Bażancie życie	4:40	Bogdan Olewicz	Zbigniew Hołdys
7	Kołysanka dla nieznajomej	3:39	Bogdan Olewicz	Sygitowicz, Nowicki, Markowski, Szkudelski
8	Miłość rośnie w nas	5:08	Bogdan Olewicz	Grzegorz Markowski
9	Niewiele Ci mogę dać	4:30	Bogdan Olewicz	Zbigniew Hołdys
10	Honorata w Soho	6:04	–	Dariusz Kozakiewicz
11	Nie płacz Ewka	5:16	Bogdan Olewicz	Zbigniew Hołdys
12	Władca danych	4:53	Bogdan Olewicz	Dariusz Kozakiewicz
13	Grawitować	3:37	Bogdan Olewicz	Grzegorz Markowski
14	Złodziej, rycerz, król i mag	3:58	Bogdan Olewicz	Grzegorz Markowski
15	Każdy tańczy sam	4:26	Bogdan Olewicz	Piotr Urbanek
16	Ale wkoło jest wesoło	4:02	Zbigniew Hołdys	
17	Chcemy być sobą	6:03	Zbigniew Hołdys	
18	Niepokonani	4:32	Bogdan Olewicz	Andrzej Nowicki
19	Jeszcze nie umarłem	2:00	Zbigniew Hołdys	

=== Technical crew ===
The following list includes the technical support for the recording of the concert in Wrocław, compiled based on the source material.

- Grzegorz Kupiec – director
- Marta Tesaryczyk – assistant director
- Artur Wojewoda – editor
- Piotr Brzeziński, Jacek Mastykarz – sound recording
- Jacek Sosna – symphony orchestra inspector
- Emilia Siepkowska – project coordinator

== Creators ==
- Grzegorz Markowski – vocals, tambourine
- Dariusz Kozakiewicz – guitar, acoustic guitar, backing vocals
- Piotr Urbanek – bass guitar
- Jacek Krzaklewski – guitar, rhythm guitar
- Piotr Szkudelski – drums
- Paweł Zarecki – piano in Niewiele Ci mogę dać
- Adam Cegielski – double bass in Nie płacz Ewka
- Barbara Szczycińska – vibraphone
- Wiesław Pieregorólka – producer
- Adam Galas – manager
- Gina Komasa – recording director
- Elżbieta Banecka, Krzysztof Konopelski – design, sound engineer, mastering

== Arrangements ==
Track(s)	Arranger
Nie raz nie dwa, Gdy mówię jestem	Wojciech Karolak
Nie płacz Ewka	Paweł Betley
Złodziej, rycerz, król i mag	Jan Kanty Pawluśkiewicz
Grawitować, Niewiele Ci mogę dać	Grzegorz Piotrowski
Miłość rośnie w nas, Niepokonani	Piotr Siejka
In an integration and an adoration, Kto dziś przygarnie mnie, Chcemy być sobą	Wojciech Zieliński
Autobiografia, Idź precz	Wiesław Pieregorólka
Kołysanka dla nieznajomej, Każdy tańczy sam	Adam Sztaba

=== Tracklist ===
This list pertains to the albums Perfect Symfonicznie (2002) and Perfect Symfonicznie – Platinum (2007). The tracklist of the concert edition released in 2009 is listed in the section above.

#	Track	Length	Lyrics	Music
1	In an integration and an adoration	2:04	–	Wojciech Zieliński
2	Kto dziś przygarnie mnie	4:38	Bogdan Olewicz	Piotr Urbanek
3	Nie raz nie dwa	3:20	Bogdan Olewicz	Grzegorz Markowski
4	Idź precz	3:41	Bogdan Olewicz	Zbigniew Hołdys
5	Gdy mówię jestem	6:16	Bogdan Olewicz	Sygitowicz, Nowicki, Krzaklewski, Szkudelski
6	Kołysanka dla nieznajomej	3:39	Bogdan Olewicz	Sygitowicz, Nowicki, Markowski, Szkudelski
7	Miłość rośnie w nas	5:08	Bogdan Olewicz	Grzegorz Markowski
8	Grawitować	3:40	Bogdan Olewicz	Grzegorz Markowski
9	Niewiele Ci mogę dać	4:30	Bogdan Olewicz	Zbigniew Hołdys
10	Każdy tańczy sam	4:26	Bogdan Olewicz	Piotr Urbanek
11	Nie płacz Ewka	5:16	Bogdan Olewicz	Zbigniew Hołdys
12	Autobiografia	4:34	Bogdan Olewicz	Zbigniew Hołdys
13	Złodziej, rycerz, król i mag	3:58	Bogdan Olewicz	Grzegorz Markowski
14	Chcemy być sobą	5:12	Zbigniew Hołdys	
15	Niepokonani	4:22	Bogdan Olewicz	Andrzej Nowicki

=== Additional track from Perfect Symfonicznie – Platinum ===
#	Track	Length	Lyrics	Music
16	Póki mam jeden sen	4:21	Bogdan Olewicz	Filip Siejka
