= Polish Radio Symphony Orchestra =

- Radio orchestra
- Native name: Polska Orkiestra Radiowa
- Founded: 1946; 80 years ago
- Location: Warsaw, Poland
- Principal conductor: Michał Klauza
- Website: The Polish Radio Symphony Orchestra

The Polish Radio Symphony Orchestra (Polish: Polska Orkiestra Radiowa) is a Polish radio orchestra founded in 1945 in Warsaw by Stefan Rachoń. Initially, the orchestra made records only for Polish radio and television. In 1970, the orchestra began to tour and release recordings, particularly of Polish music such as that of Wojciech Kilar, Zygmunt Krauze and others.

== Musical directors ==
- Stefan Rachoń (1945–1976)
- Wlodzimierz Kamirsky (1976–1980)
- Ian Prushak
- Mieczyslaw Nowakowski
- Tadeusz Strugała
- Wojciech Raisky
- Łukasz Borowicz (2007–2015)
- Michał Klauza (since 2015)
