= Radio in Poland =

The history of radio broadcasting in Poland serves as a reflection of the nation's turbulent 20th-century trajectory, encompassing the technological development of the wireless medium, its institutional evolution, and its profound impact on social stratification and cultural identity. Since its inception, Polish radio has functioned variously as a state-building instrument in the Second Polish Republic, a clandestine tool of resistance during the German occupation, a centralized apparatus of propaganda under the Polish People's Republic, and a contested space of political pluralism and commercial competition in the post-1989 democratic order.

== Second Polish Republic ==
The inception of broadcasting in Poland was inextricably linked to the geopolitical reconstruction of the state following the Partitions of Poland. Unlike the commercial model that proliferated in the United States, the Polish authorities adopted a European public service paradigm, viewing the radio spectrum as a strategic domain of state sovereignty. The initial experimental phase, led by the Polish Radiotechnical Society (Polskie Towarzystwo Radiotechniczne), concluded with the formal establishment of Polskie Radio on August 18, 1925. Regular broadcasting commenced in April 1926, establishing a state-guaranteed monopoly.

The expansion of radio infrastructure was driven by the political imperative to unify a nation stitched together from disparate legal and administrative systems formerly under Russian, Prussian, and Austrian rule. The construction of the Raszyn transmitter in 1931 marked a technological watershed; with a power of 120 kW, it was the strongest broadcasting mast in Europe at the time. This technical reach allowed Polskie Radio to perform a homogenizing linguistic and cultural function, standardizing the Polish language and disseminating "high culture"—including Chopin recitals and literary readings—to a largely agrarian society. By 1939, the number of registered subscribers exceeded one million, signifying the medium's transition from a technological novelty to a primary vehicle of social integration.

== World War II ==
Following the Invasion of Poland in September 1939, the legal status of radio receivers was radically altered. The Nazi occupation authorities issued a decree confiscating all receiving equipment, rendering possession a capital offense. Consequently, radio shifted from a public utility to a clandestine instrument of the Polish Underground State. During the Siege of Warsaw, the daily broadcasts of Mayor Stefan Starzyński played a pivotal role in maintaining civilian morale until the destruction of the city's power plant silenced the transmitters.

Throughout the occupation, the population engaged in "listening in" to Allied transmissions, primarily the BBC and the Polish government-in-exile, which provided a vital counter-narrative to the propaganda of the occupier. A singular phenomenon of this era was the Błyskawica (Lightning) station during the Warsaw Uprising of 1944. Operating under constant artillery bombardment and frequently relocating to avoid detection, Błyskawica broadcast news in multiple languages, symbolizing the preservation of Polish state continuity amidst the physical annihilation of the capital.

== The communist era ==
The imposition of a communist regime in 1945 transformed the radio infrastructure into a centralized apparatus for the engineering of social consciousness. The post-war reconstruction prioritized "wire broadcasting" (radiofonizacja przewodowa) via loudspeakers known as kołchoźniks, a system that allowed the authorities to monopolize the narrative and restrict access to "hostile" frequencies. During the Stalinist period, programming was dominated by the aesthetics of Socialist realism and didactic mobilization campaigns.

However, the political "Thaw" of 1956 initiated a complex period of cultural liberalization. While the news remained subject to strict censorship, the radio became a laboratory for artistic experimentation. In 1957, the Polish Radio Experimental Studio (Studio Eksperymentalne Polskiego Radia) was established under the aegis of Józef Patkowski. It became one of the few centers for electroacoustic music behind the Iron Curtain, hosting avant-garde composers such as Krzysztof Penderecki and facilitating a rare convergence of state patronage and radical modernist aesthetics.

Simultaneously, the Polish Section of Radio Free Europe (RFE), broadcasting from Munich, functioned as an external "fourth estate." Led by Jan Nowak-Jeziorański, RFE engaged in a decades-long information war with the regime. The interplay between the state's jamming stations and the public’s persistent attempts to tune into RFE constituted a defining feature of the Cold War auditory landscape in Poland.

== The sociological phenomenon of "Trójka" ==
A distinct and enduring phenomenon within the state media apparatus was Polskie Radio Program III, commonly known as Trójka, established in 1962. Ostensibly a channel for youth and students, Trójka evolved into a liberal enclave for the intelligentsia, operating on a unique tacit agreement with the authorities: in exchange for political restraint, the station was permitted to broadcast Western rock music, sophisticated literary adaptations, and satirical cabarets.

Trójka functioned as a cultural "safety valve," cultivating a specific community of listeners defined by intellectual aspiration and a shared understanding of Aesopian language—a mode of communication using allegory, irony, and allusion to bypass censorship. Personalities such as Wojciech Mann, Piotr Kaczkowski, and Marek Niedźwiecki transcended the role of presenters to become cultural curators, introducing genres like progressive rock, blues, and the New Wave to a Polish audience cut off from Western markets.

The station’s impact was cemented by satirical programs like Ilustrowany Tygodnik Rozrywkowy and later 60 minut na godzinę, which deconstructed the "wooden language" of official propaganda through surrealist humor. For decades, Trójka served as a form of "internal emigration," creating a virtual space where the suffocating norms of the Polish People's Republic were temporarily suspended. This ethos created a multigenerational loyalty that persisted long after the fall of communism, making the station a unique cultural institution in Europe.

== Post-1989 transformation and the dual system ==
The systemic transition of 1989 and the subsequent Broadcasting Act of 1992 dismantled the state monopoly, establishing the National Broadcasting Council (Krajowa Rada Radiofonii i Telewizji) as a regulatory body. The opening of the frequency spectrum to private capital led to the rapid emergence of commercial giants such as RMF FM in Kraków and Radio Zet in Warsaw. These stations introduced Western formatting standards—characterized by playlist rotations, dynamic news cycles, and aggressive marketing—shifting the paradigm from the "listener-citizen" model of public service broadcasting to a "listener-consumer" model.

== Politicization and the crisis of public media ==
While public broadcasting in Poland has historically struggled to maintain distance from the political sphere, the intensity of political instrumentality escalated significantly following the parliamentary elections of 2015. Legislative changes introduced by the Law and Justice (PiS) government, including the transfer of appointment powers to the newly created National Media Council (Rada Mediów Narodowych), marked a shift towards the re-centralization of media management and the direct subordination of editorial policy to party interests.

This period precipitated a profound institutional crisis within Polskie Radio, most visibly dismantling the autonomous status of Trójka. The gradual erosion of editorial independence led to the dismissal or protest resignation of iconic journalists who had defined the station's intellectual character for decades. The crisis culminated in May 2020 in an event widely interpreted as a return to censorship: the annulment of the voting results of the Lista Przebojów Programu Trzeciego (LP3) after the song "Twój ból jest lepszy niż mój" ("Your Pain is Better Than Mine") by Kazik Staszewski, which was critical of party leader Jarosław Kaczyński, reached number one.

The accusations of vote manipulation leveled by the management against the host, Marek Niedźwiecki, triggered a mass exodus of the station's personnel and a boycott by the artistic community, effectively ending the station's role as a culture-forming institution. This disintegration resulted in the migration of the "intelligentsia radio" ethos to the digital sphere. Former employees successfully leveraged their social capital to launch crowdfunded internet stations, Radio Nowy Świat and Radio 357, which have since reconstituted the format and community of the "old Trójka" outside the structures of the state.

== Post-2023 institutional restructuring ==
The parliamentary elections of October 15, 2023, which resulted in a transfer of power to a coalition led by Donald Tusk, initiated a radical legal and structural reconfiguration of the public media landscape. The new administration declared the "depoliticization" of mass media a primary governance objective, arguing that Polskie Radio had been converted into a partisan instrument violating statutory requirements of impartiality.

However, the systemic reform faced significant legal and constitutional hurdles, primarily due to the continued operation of the National Media Council—dominated by appointees of the previous administration—and the legislative veto power of President Andrzej Duda. In a move described by legal scholars as a "forceful restoration of constitutional order" and by the opposition as an illegal takeover, the Minister of Culture Bartłomiej Sienkiewicz invoked provisions of the Commercial Companies Code. On December 27, 2023, he formally placed the public broadcasting companies, including Polskie Radio S.A., into a state of "liquidation" (stan likwidacji).

This legal maneuver, while controversial, neutralized the influence of the National Media Council and allowed for the immediate dismissal of management boards associated with the Law and Justice party. The subsequent period was characterized by a broad personnel overhaul, the removal of content deemed to be propaganda, and an attempt to restore editorial neutrality.

Despite these efforts, the "recapture" of the audience proved challenging, particularly regarding the legacy of Trójka. The institutional discontinuity between 2020 and 2023 had resulted in permanent shifts in listener habits. With the former Trójka ethos successfully reconstituted in the private, crowdfunded sector by Radio Nowy Świat and Radio 357, the public broadcaster faced a new existential challenge: redefining its mission in a fragmented media ecosystem where its traditional role as the primary curator of high culture and intelligentsia discourse had been irrevocably decentralized.

== Polish radio-related sites ==
- radiopolska.pl - the biggest Polish radio site featuring news, AM/FM/DAB+ station list and forum
- fmdx.pl - main Polish website for DXing
- maps.fmdx.pl - maps of radio transmitters in Europe, Asia and Northern Africa
- emsoft.ct8.pl - polish radio station list including URL streams of national and regional services
- xploradio - Polish DXer Maciej Ługowski blog featuring DXing, travel and media

== Statistics ==
In Q3 2025, the most popular radio station in Poland was RMF FM with marketshare of 29%, followed by Radio Zet (14,6%) and Radio Eska (6,9%).

== See also ==
- Polish Radio
- Radio stations in interwar Poland
- List of radio stations in Poland
- Polskie Radio
