= Perfect (Polish band) =

Polish rock band

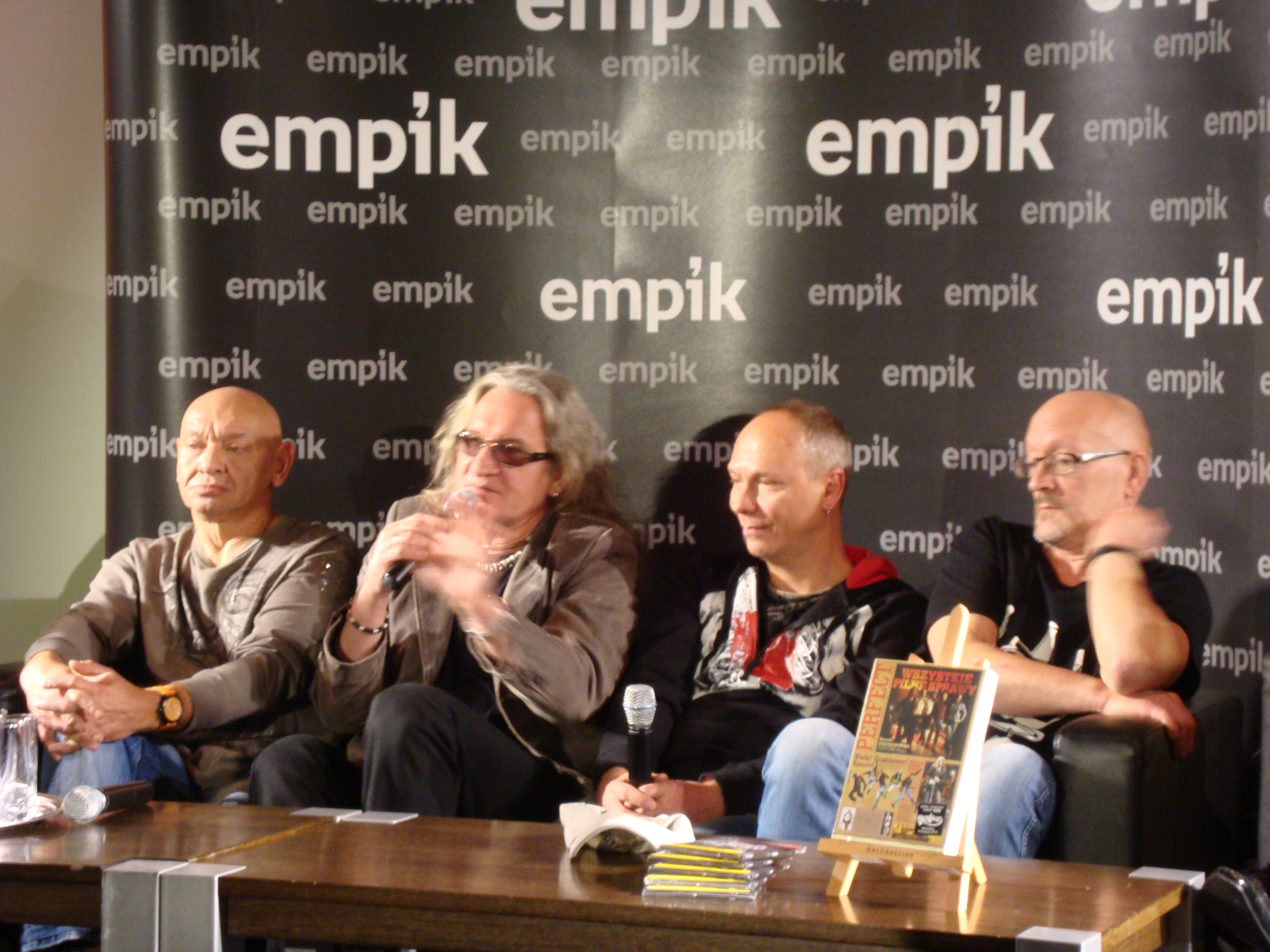
- Perfect, 2010

Background information
- Also known as: Perfect Super Show and Disco Band (1978–1980)
- Origin: Warsaw, Poland
- Genres: Rock, pop rock, hard rock
- Years active: 1977–1983, 1987, 1989–1992, 1993–2021, 2023
- Labels: Polskie Nagrania Muza, Koch International, Izabelin Studio, Universal Music Poland, Metal Mind Productions, EMI Music Poland
- Website: www.perfect.art.pl

Perfect is a Polish rock band founded in 1977 by drummer Wojciech Morawski, bass guitar player Zdzisław Zawadzki and lead guitar player Zbigniew Hołdys. They are one of the all-time most popular rock bands from/in Poland.

== History ==
Initially, the band played easy-listening pop music under the name Perfect Super Show and Disco Band. Their line-up included Basia Trzetrzelewska, who would later join Matt Bianco. After her departure in 1980, the band changed their name to 'Perfect' and turned to hard rock music with Grzegorz Markowski as their lead vocalist. In 1981, Perfect recorded their debut album that sold almost one million copies in Poland alone. It included their first hits, Nie płacz Ewka ("Don't Cry, Eve") and Chcemy być sobą ("We Want to be Ourselves"), released as a 7-inch single. Their second album, UNU, released in late 1982, in a period when martial law was introduced in Poland. It sold less than half million copies (vinyl + CD reissue) and included another classic song: Autobiografia ("Autobiography"), dedicated to a Polish rock-and-roll generation that grew up under communist rule. In 1983, Perfect released their first live album that sold 200 000 copies. Subsequently, they disbanded, only occasionally appearing on stage – in 1987 (Poland), 1989 and in the early 1990s, when they toured in the United States twice. The original line-up without Holdys reunited in 1994 and recorded their fourth studio album Jestem ("I am") which included another hit Kołysanka dla nieznajomej ("A Lullaby for a Stranger"), and sold over 130 000 copies. The band remained active until 2021.

Before 2021, the band wanted to do a farewell tour, they released their last single Głos (voice) in 2020 and started touring all across Poland. On the 27 April 2021, Grzegorz Markowski announced via the Facebook page of his daughter that his health was going down. The rest of the band said they would play on "for Grzegorz". That never happened. Instead, a few weeks later the band disbanded.

== Band members ==
=== The last line-up ===
- Dariusz Kozakiewicz – lead guitar (1978, 1997–2021, 2023)
- Grzegorz Markowski – lead vocals (1980–1983, 1987, 1993–2021, 2023)
- Jacek Krzaklewski – rhythm guitar (1989–2021, 2023)
- Piotr Urbanek – bass guitar (1998–2021,.2023)

=== Past members ===
- Jolanta Darowna - vocals (1977-1978)
- Marta Figiel - vocals (1977-1979)
- Ewa Konarzewska - vocals (1977-1980)
- Barbara Trzetrzelewska (1977-1979)
- Anna Pietrzak - vocals (1980)
- Zbigniew Hołdys - guitar, vocals (1978-1992)
- Winicjusz Chróst - guitar (1977-1978, died in 2021)
- Ryszard Sygitowicz - guitar (1980-1982, 1993-1997)
- Andrzej Urny - guitar (1982-1994, died in 2021)
- Paweł Dąbrowski - bass guitar (1977-1978)
- Zdzisław Zawadzki - bass guitar (1978-1982, died in 1998)
- Andrzej Nowicki - bass guitar (1982-1987, 1993-1998, died in 2000)
- Mieczysław "Mechanik" Jurecki - bass guitar (1989-1992)
- Wojciech Morawski - drums (1977-1980)
- Piotr Szkudelski - drums (1980-2020, died in 2022)
- Paweł Tabaka - keyboards (1977-1978, 1978-1979)
- Antoni Kopff - keyboards (1978)
- Krzysztof Orłowski - keyboards (1980)

== Touring members ==
- Krzysztof Patocki - drums (2020)
- Sławomir Puchała - drums (2020-2021, 2023)

=== Timeline ===
Source:

== Discography ==
=== Studio albums ===
Title	Album details	Peak chart positions	Certifications
Title	Album details	POL	Certifications
Perfect	Released: 1981; Label: Polskie Nagrania Muza; Formats: LP, CD, CS, digital download	1	ZPAV: Platinum
UNU	Released: 1982; Label: Tonpress KAW; Formats: LP, CD, CS, digital download	—	
Jestem	Released: 1994; Label: Koch International; Formats: CD, CS	—	ZPAV: Gold
Geny	Released: 1997; Label: Izabelin Studio; Formats: LP, CD	—	ZPAV: Gold
Śmigło	Released: 1999; Label: Universal Music Poland; Formats: CD, CS	—	
Schody	Released: April 1, 2004; Label: Universal Music Poland; Formats: LP, CD	—	
XXX	Released: November 9, 2010; Label: EMI Music Poland; Formats: CD, digital download	1	ZPAV: Gold
DaDaDam	Released: June 9, 2014; Label: Polskie Radio/Warner Music; Formats: CD, digital download	2	ZPAV: Platinum
Muzyka	Released: October 14, 2016; Label: Polskie Radio; Formats: CD, digital download	-	
"—" denotes a recording that did not chart or was not released in that territory.

=== Live albums ===
Title	Album details	Peak chart positions
Title	Album details	POL
Live	Released: 1983; Label: Savitor; Formats: LP, CD, digital download	40
Live April 1'1987	Released: 1987; Label: Pronit, Polton; Formats: LP, CD, CS	—
Katowice Spodek Live '94	Released: 1994; Label: Armco Music; Formats: CD, CS	37
Suwałki Live '98	Released: 1998; Label: Universal Music Poland; Formats: CD	—
Live 2001	Released: 2001; Label: Universal Music Poland; Formats: CD, CS	—
Perfect - Trójka Live	Released: 2007; Label: 3 Sky Media Presspublic; Formats: CD, CS	—
Z Archiwum Polskiego Radia, Vol. 20 – Perfect	Released: 2009; Label: Polskie Radio; Formats: CD	14
Z wtorku na środę	Released: April 20, 2009; Label: Metal Mind Productions; Formats: CD	—
Perfect Symfonicznie	Released: October 19, 2009; Label: Metal Mind Productions; Formats: CD	16
"—" denotes a recording that did not chart or was not released in that territory.

=== Video albums ===
Title	Album details	Certifications
Z wtorku na środę	Released: June 18, 2007; Label: Metal Mind Productions; Formats: DVD	ZPAV: Gold
Perfect Symfonicznie	Released: October 19, 2009; Label: Metal Mind Productions; Formats: DVD	ZPAV: Gold
