= Radio Złote Przeboje =

Polish adult contemporary radio station

- Opole; Poland
- Broadcast area: Poland (National)

Programming
- Language: Polish
- Format: Adult contemporary

Ownership
- Owner: Grupa Radiowa Agory Sp. z o.o.; (Agora)
- Operator: Jarosław Barwiak

History
- Founded: 1997
- First air date: 1997
- Former names: Złote Przeboje

Links
- Website: zloteprzeboje.tuba.pl

Radio Złote Przeboje (Polish pronunciation: [ˈradjɔ ˈzwɔtɛ pʂɛˈbɔjɛ]; lit. 'Golden Hits Radio'), also simply Złote Przeboje, is a Polish radio station targeted at 25- to 50-year-olds. The 'Golden Hits' of the name originally referred to music from the 1960s, 1970s and 1980s. The radio operator since 26 November 2012 is Jarosław Barwiak, and the music director since August 2018 is Joanna Sołtysiak.

== History ==
The radio was founded in 1997 by Agora as one of its products. In 2004, Agora decided to make its products more close to their brand, merging many of them, including its own radio stations, e.g. Radio Pogoda became Radio Złote Przeboje Pogoda. In 2007, local radio presenters were fired and replaced by local offices which now broadcast the countrywide Radio Złote Przeboje.

From 2007 to 2010, Marek Niedźwiecki was associated with the radio and led a few podcasts, most importantly his record chart called "Lista przebojów Marka Niedźwieckiego". Many other famous people were associated with the radio, such as Robert Janowski, Jarosław Boberek, Marcin Prokop and Michał Koterski.

Over time, the radio's broadcast schedule changed. In its first years, it mainly broadcast music from the 60s, 70s, and 80s, though it progressively changed to 70s, 80s, 90s and 2000s.

== Frequencies ==
Frequencies (Note: Frequencies may slightly differ depending on the listener's location.)
City	Frequency
Białystok	101,0 MHz
Częstochowa	96,6 MHz
Gdańsk	103,0 MHz
Gdynia	99,22 MHz
Gorlice	99,6 MHz
Hrubieszów	99,5 MHz
Jelenia Góra	106,2 MHz
Jędrzejów	93,2 MHz
Katowice	91,2 MHz
Kraków	92,5 MHz
Krynica-Zdrój	91,3 MHz
Legnica	90,0 MHz
Lublin	95,6 MHz
Łódź	101,3 MHz
Nowy Sącz	93,8 MHz
Nowy Targ	91,3 MHz
Opole	92,8 MHz
Poznań	88,4 MHz
Rzeszów	95,7 MHz
Skomielna Czarna	94,0 MHz
Szczecin	89,8 MHz
Tarnów	92,8 MHz
Wałbrzych	91,8 MHz
Warsaw	100,1 MHz
Wetlina	103,6 MHz
Wolin	105,6 MHz
Wrocław	90,4 MHz
Zabrze	96,6 MHz
Zamość	99,3 MHz
Zielona Góra	98,1 MHz
Żary	94,4 MHz

== See also ==
- Agora (company)
- Radio ZET
- Radio in Poland
- List of Polish-language radio stations
