= National Media Council (Poland) =

- Rada Mediów Narodowych
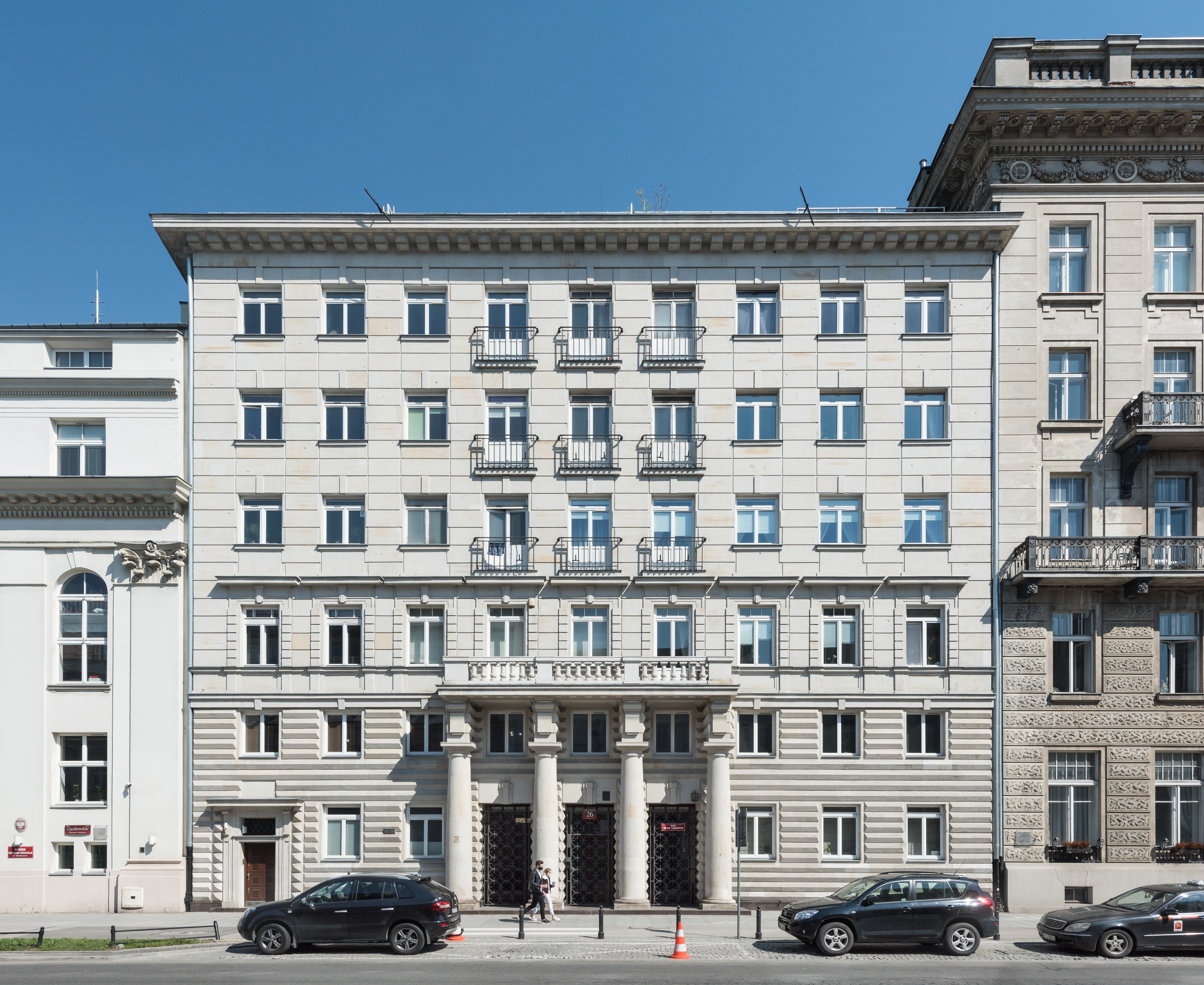
- Headquarters of the council

Agency overview
- Formed: June 22, 2016
- Headquarters: 26 Ujazdów Avenue, Warsaw
- Parent department: Council of Ministers
- Website: sejm.gov.pl/Sejm10.nsf/page.xsp/rmn_sklad

The National Media Council (Polish: Rada Mediów Narodowych) is a Polish government agency "with the right to hire and fire personnel for state television and radio", namely Telewizja Polska, the Polish Radio and the Polish Press Agency. It was established in 2016.

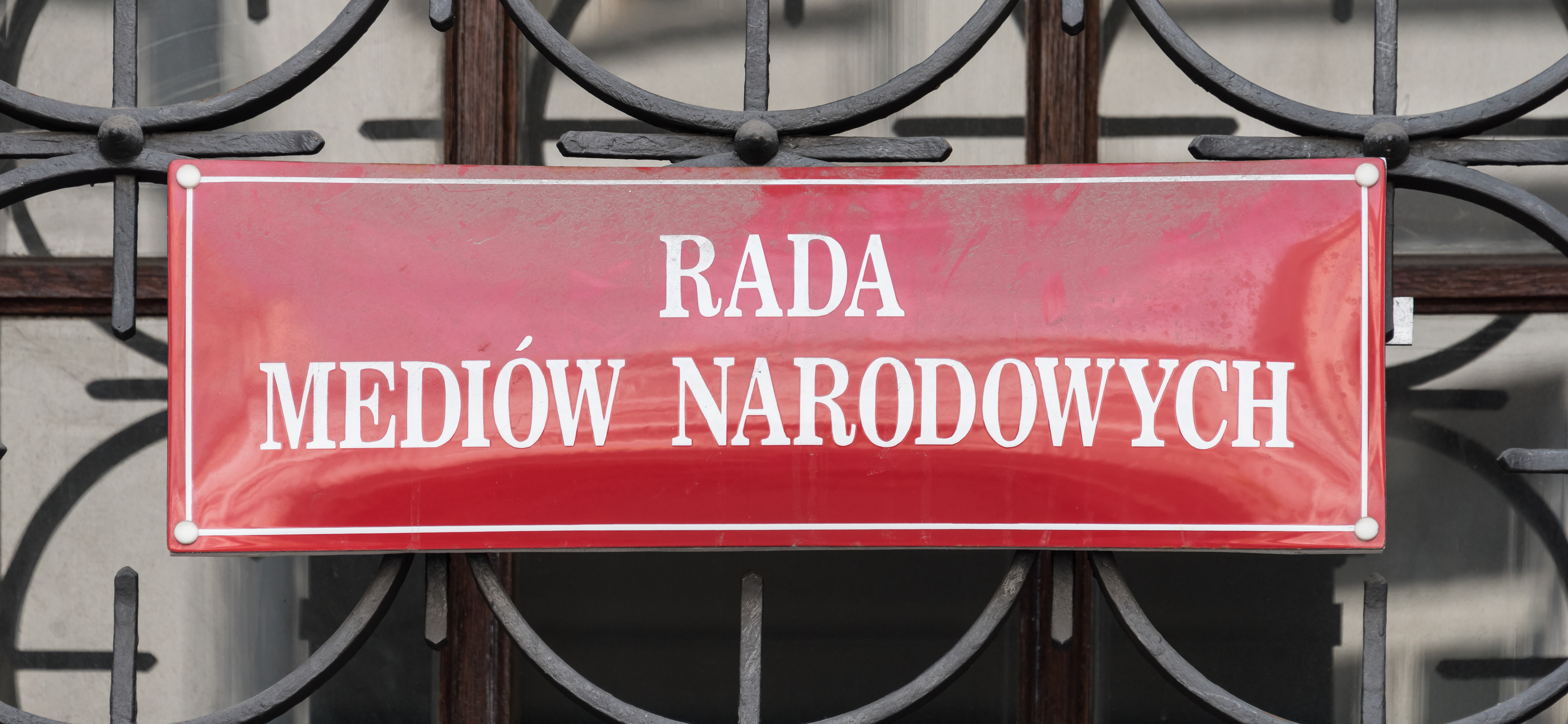
The National Media Council plaque at Ujazdów Avenue 26 in Warsaw

The council consists of five members: three appointed by the ruling majority and two from opposition parties. Each member serves a six-year term. The council has been criticised for favouring the Law and Justice Party and turning Telewizja Polska and Polish Radio External Service into propaganda mouthpieces. Following the Law and Justice Party's loss of majority in the Sejm in the 2023 Polish parliamentary election the council has been sidelined and no longer appoints the management boards of state media, due to its disputed legal status.
