= Stefan Rachoń =

Polish violinist

Stefan Rachoń (1906–2001) was a Polish violin player.
