= Marek Niedźwiecki =

Polish music journalist and radio anchor (born 1954)

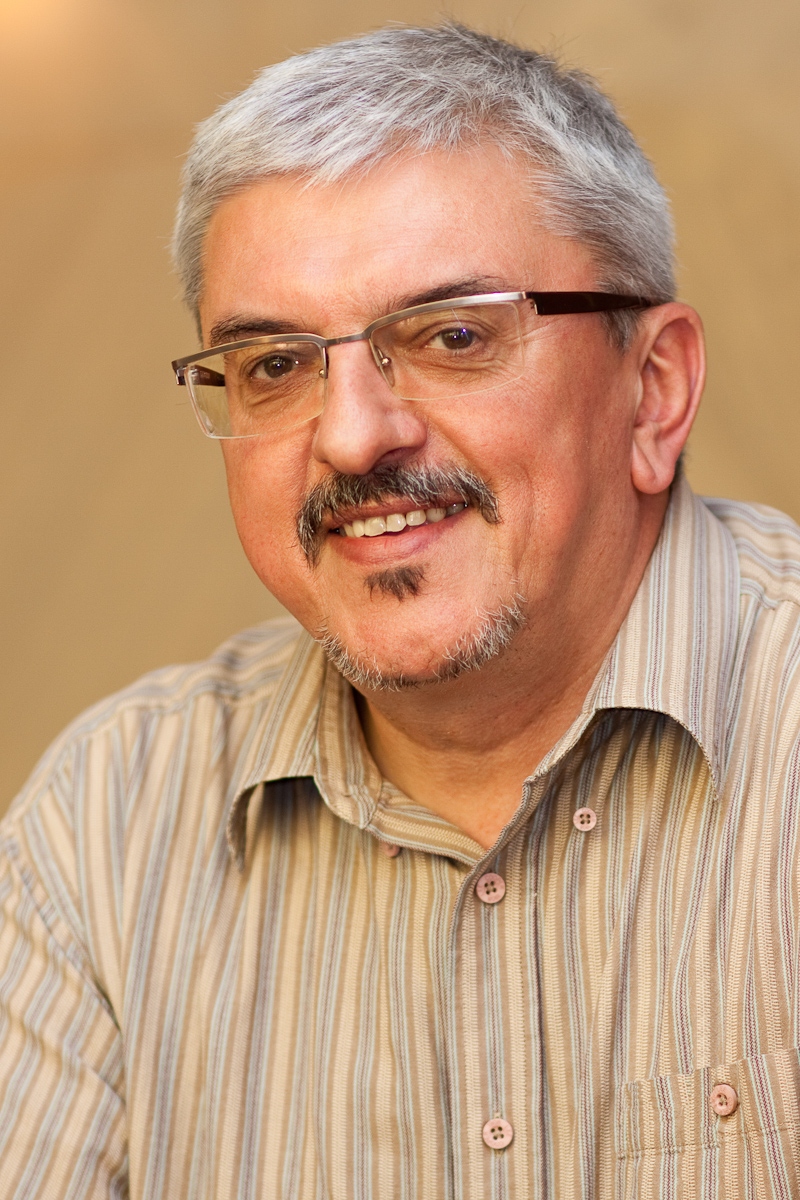
- Born: 24 March 1954 (age 72); Sieradz
- Occupation: radio presenter
- Years active: 1973 till now
- Known for: Polish Radio Three Charts
- Website: http://www.marekniedzwiecki.pl/

Signature
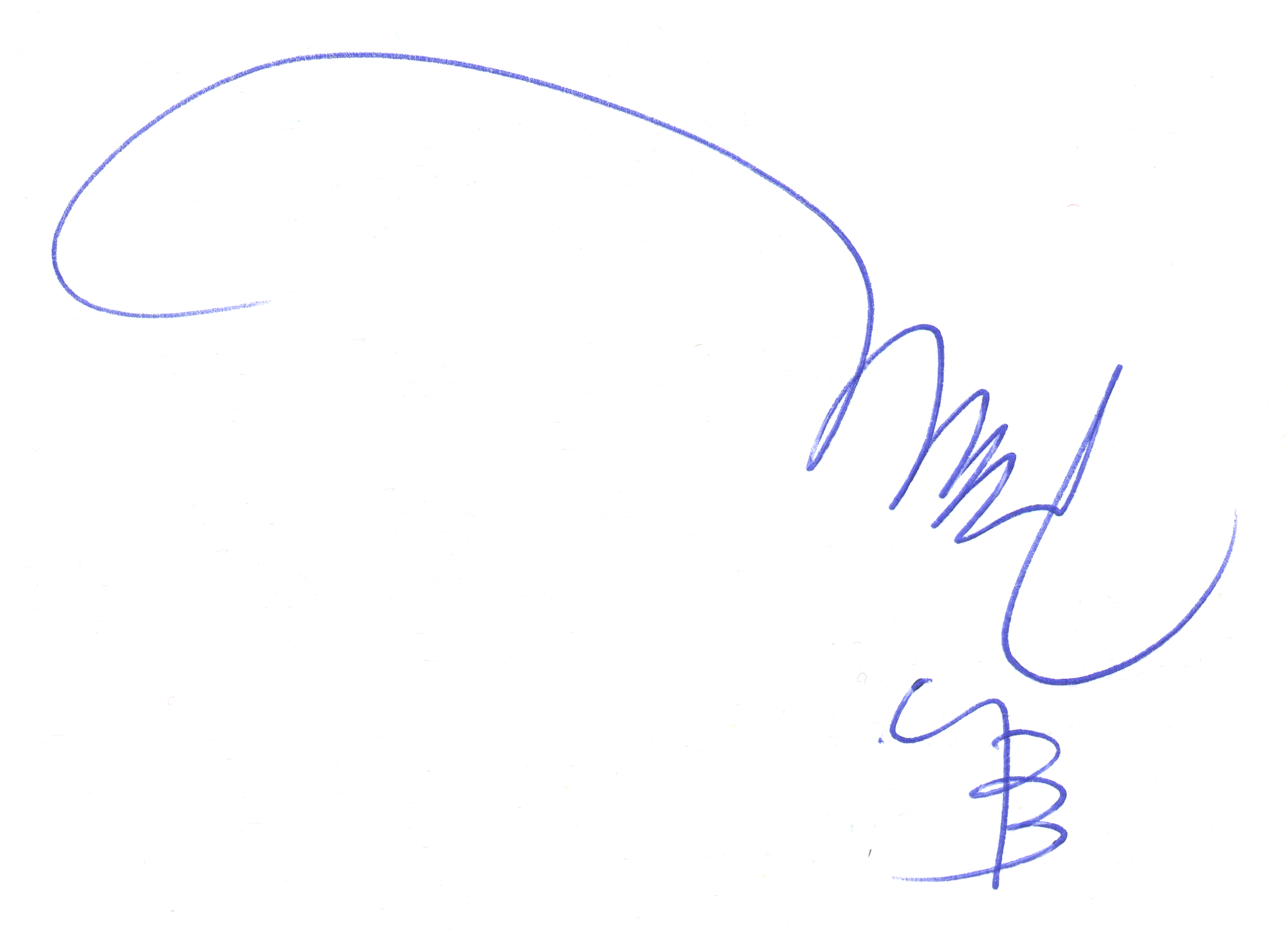

Marek Wojciech Niedźwiecki (born March 24, 1954, in Sieradz, Poland) is a Polish music journalist and radio anchor.

== Early life ==
=== Family ===
Marek Niedźwiecki comes from the town of Szadek, Poland. His father, Wojciech Niedźwiedzki (30.01.1912 – 24.12.1993), was a butcher by profession and worked as the manager in the local food industry cooperative "Samopomoc Chłopska". His mother Kazimiera (Kopeć) Niedźwiedzka (10.12.1926 – 25.04.2015) came from a farmers’ family residing in the village of Policzko and was a history teacher at Tadeusz Kościuszko Primary School in Szadek. Kazimiera Kopeć was the second wife of Wojciech Niedźwiecki, the first one died of cancer. His grandparents on his mother's side, Zofia and Franciszek Kopeć lived in Policzko their whole life. As a child, Marek Niedźwiecki lived with his parents and his grandparents on his father's side: Leokadia i Wincenty Niedźwiedzcy. He has one older sister Małgorzata (born 1952) and two younger brothers (twins) Piotr and Wojciech (born 11.10.1956). Piotr Niedźwiecki is the president of the city of Zduńska Wola.

=== Name ===
The difference in parents’ name spelling is not a mistake. Originally, the family name was spelled with "dz". Marek Niedźwiecki explains it: "When my older sister was applying to University, it turned out that in some of her school reports the name was spelled Niedźwiedzka with <<dz>> and in some others – with <<c>>. For her to be accepted at University, it had to be unified. Apparently, it was easier and shorter to spell the name with <<c>>. So, in my birth certificate the name is spelled with <<dz>> but I am actually Niedźwiecki with <<c>>."

=== Education ===
Tadeusz Kościuszko Primary and Junior High School (formerly Karol Świerczewski Primary School) in Szadek, Prusinowska Street 4 (formerly Warszawska Street 2)

John Paul II Secondary School №2 (formerly Małgorzata Fornalska Primary and Secondary School №33) in Zduńska Wola, Komisji Edukacji Narodowej Street 6 (formerly Jasna 2)

Lodz University of Technology, The Faculty of Civil Engineering, Architecture and Environmental Engineering, master's dissertation topic: "The technology and construction organisation of the trading pavilion SPS1300", defended 24.03.1979.

== Private life ==
Marek Niedźwiecki is a bit superstitious and believes in numerology. On 9 September 2009 (09.09.09) he visited the village of Policzko, where he used to spend summer holidays as a small child. Entries on his blog traditionally appear at 19.54 which is the year of his birth. When he forgets something and has to come back home, he usually sits for a moment, and leaving the house he always leaves a hanger on the bed.

He claims to have been a rickshaw driver in Calcutta in his previous life

He got his driving licence in January 1978 and since then has driven two Fiats, one Renault, one Golf and four Hondas (a chocolate CRV now).

Marek Niedźwiecki has been given many awards, such as the Golden Microphone in 1993, The Gold Cross of Merit (Polish: Złoty Krzyż Zasługi) in 2000 and The Officer's Cross of the Order of Polonia Restituta (Polish: Order Odrodzenia Polski, English: Order of Rebirth of Poland) in 2011.

In 2007 he had a benign tumor removed from his ear. This experience changed his attitude to life. "When it turned out to be just a benign pimple, I felt like in the song by Kazik: "I came back from the land of the dead". I got my strength back and I promised myself not to break down in similar situations. I also started to concentrate more on everyday pleasures."

He has never married and is not planning to do so. "I have never wanted to get into relationship, have a burden of wife and kids. I knew I couldn't handle it. [...] I wanted to be alone. And nothing has changed since then."

== Professional career ==
=== Students’ Radio "Żak", Lodz University of Technology, Łodź, 1973 – 1980 ===
The beginning of Marek Niedźwiecki's radio career is connected to the fact that his older sister studied at Lodz University of Technology (at the Faculty of Material Technologies and Textile Design) and she was the one to tell him about the existence of the students’ radio. As Marek Niedźwiecki had dreamed about becoming a radio journalist since early childhood, the idea of studying there to be able to work in the students' radio, came to him immediately.

Students' Radio "Żak" was the station where Marek Niedźwiecki started to make his first Radio Charts. As the radio range covered only the University of Technology dormitories, the listeners and the voters were only students. Special letter boxes for votes were placed in all the dormitories, the votes were collected up until Thursday night, and the Charts was emitted on Friday.

Students’ Radio "Żak" and its Charts were the first to give Marek Niedźwiecki some popularity. He recalls the times with sentiment: "I like those beginnings of mine. I don’t distance myself from them. Now in the programme "Markomania" I do a small window – Radio Luxemburg Charts from 40 years before – so I play those things that I used to play in "Żak". It's really nice for me, because I read the charts and in my mind I am watching a film from the past: I recall what I played then, what I looked like, what new songs appeared, which ones disappeared."

=== Polish Radio Łódź, Łódź, 1.05.1978 – 1982 ===
His first contact with Polish Radio Łódź Marek Niedźwiecki established through Józef Wojcieszczyk and his programme "Students’ and Factories’ Radio", where first he appeared as a guest talking about Students’ Radio "Żak" and later on, preparing music for other programs of the series.

In April 1978 the station opened the post of the radio linkman for competition and Marek Niedźwiecki won. Apart from announcing the programmes currently on air, he also started preparing his own programmes, the most popular of which turned out to be "Discorama" in cooperation with Małgorzata Kamińska.

=== Polish Radio Three, Warsaw, 1.04.1982 – 31.07.2007 ===
At the end of March 1982 Marek Niedźwiecki received a message that Polskie Radio Program III (reorganised because of the Martial Law introduced in Poland a few months before) wants to employ him. The manager, Andrzej Turski, offered him the full–time job, mainly to create Polish Radio Three Charts.

In this period of time, apart from Radio Three Charts, Marek Niedźwiecki also worked as a presenter in such programmes as "Zapraszamy do Trójki", "W tonacji Trójki" and "Pół perfekcyjnej płyty". He was the creator of music programmes "Markomania", "Frutti di Marek" and "Chillout Cafe"(with Agnieszka Szydłowska).

=== Radio "Złote Przeboje", Warsaw, 1.12.2007 - 1.04 2010 ===
Although Polish Radio Three had been his dream work-place, in 2007 Marek Niedźwiecki decided to change the radio station and start working for Radio Złote Przeboje.

This is what he says to justify his decision, which created a lot of turmoil, especially among fans: "I thought I was changing the radio station because I got offended by what was happening in Polish Radio Three at that moment. Radio Three Charts was about to celebrate its 25th anniversary and we were planning a big concert at Agrykola Stadium, but Krzysztof Skowroński, who was the CEO at the time, said that the concert was not to take place because it would be associated with the 25th anniversary of Martial Law. He also thought up these three-hour-long concerts on Friday mornings which meant that my programme "W tonacji Trójki" lasted 18 minutes instead of an hour."

In Radio Złote Przeboje Marek Niedźwiecki had three programmes: The Charts, "Złote, słodsze, najsłodsze" and "Top Wszech Czasów", all three similar to the ones he used to have in Polish Radio Three.

=== Polish Radio Three, Warsaw, 1.04 2010 - 17.05.2020 ===
Following the change in the management of Polish Radio Three, Marek Niedźwiecki decided to return saying coming back to Polish Radio Three was like coming home.

From this moment until 17.05.2020 Marek Niedźwiecki had several programmes throughout the week. On Mondays we could listen to him in the programme "Do południa" (9.00 – 12.00), on Thursday "W Tonacji Trójki" (15.00 – 16.00, later 14.00 - 15.00), on Friday either in LP3 (9.00 – 12.00) or The Charts (19.00 – 22.00) and sometimes in both, and on Saturday in "Markomania" (11.00 – 13.00). Also, he occasionally presented specific type of music, very calming and thought-provoking, before Easter (on Good Friday) and around All Saints Day (1 November) instead of The Charts.

On 15.05.2020 the song "Twój ból jest lepszy niż mój" (Your pain is better than mine) sung by Kazik Staszewski debuted on the Charts, on the first position. The song critically referred to the visit of the member of Polish Parliament Jarosław Kaczyński on the cemetery, which he did against the current law prohibiting such practices because of the COVID-19 pandemic. The next day the management of Polish Radio 3 annulled this particular Charts 1998, claiming that the song had appeared from outside the Charts and the results had been manipulated. On Sunday, 17.05.2020, Marek Niedźwiecki issued an announcement: "Due to the accusations of dishonesty in preparing my programme I resign from cooperating with Polish Radio 3"

=== Radio 357, Warsaw, currently ===
Now Niedźwiedzki works at Radio 357, a crowdfunded internet radio made by him and different journalists who left Trójka.

=== Cooperation ===
Marek Niedźwiecki also cooperated/cooperates with Polish Radio One, TVP2, RTL7, MTV Classic, nPremium HD, Canal+, Radio Smooth Jazz Cafe (on YouTube), Filipinka, Wietrzne Radio, Radionewsletter, Edukacja Filmowa.

== Polish Radio Three Charts ==
One of the most famous quotes from Marek Niedźwiecki is "The Charts is the most important thing that happened in my life. I think that nothing more interesting can ever happen to me."

Created in 1982, Lista Przebojów Programu Trzeciego got immediate popularity. The first edition was broadcast on 24 April, but a week before Marek Niedźwiecki presented a set of songs for the listeners to choose from. The first number one was "I’ll find my way home" by Jon & Vangelis.

Throughout the years the time and day of The Charts broadcast changed, it was Saturday or Friday – each twice, between 20.00 and 22.00, 18.00 – 22.00 and 19.00 – 22.00. Now it is emitted every Friday, from 19.00 till 22.00.

Originally, Marek Niedźwiecki was the only host of The Charts. In the times of his illness or holiday he was replaced by a number of people, hosting from one to thirty one programmes and including such popular names as Wojciech Mann, Piotr Kaczkowski, Piotr Metz, Piotr Stelmach, Grzegorz Miecugow or Kuba Strzyczkowski. When Marek Niedźwiecki left for Radio Złote Przeboje, Piotr Baron became the host. After his coming back, he and Piotr Baron host The Charts in turns, and the one not hosting The Charts in the given week, hosts the morning programme LP3 in which songs from The Charts (both current and archival) are presented.

First the votes were sent on postcards or dictated on the phone by the listeners, since April 1996 voting has been done by the Internet. The number of votes per person changed from two in the beginning to ten nowadays. The Charts used to include 20 songs, then 30, 40, now it is 50 divided into two parts: the so-called "waiting room" (only a small part of each song is presented) and the basic list (the songs going up are presented in full).

The Charts used to have many interludes such as short reports from the Netherlands, the USA, France, "letters from fans" (which at the beginning weren’t actual letters at all, they were all made up, but people took to this idea immediately and started writing real letters to Maria Teodorowicz, who presented those ), news from the music world, chats with Polish music stars and a huge collection of jingles introducing different parts of the programme. The most recognisable, and still used, is the song "The look of love" by ABC and the voice of a little boy named Czarek who says "goodbye" in a very cute way – both usually played at the end of the programme. Marek Niedźwiecki also uses mails from the listeners during the programme, organises quizzes, sometimes invites guests (usually musicians) and before the 10th position on The Charts there are a few minutes for Helen (Halina Wachowicz), who gives the results of the quizzes or just chats with the host.

From time to time, The Charts takes place outside the studio. "The Charts on location" is especially popular among fans because it gives them the possibility to watch Marek Niedźwiecki at work, but Marek Niedźwiecki himself considers it a really bad idea: "In my opinion, we, in Radio Three, didn’t manage to find a suitable solution, so that it would be interesting for the people who come to the events outside the studio, and, at the same time, for the listeners, who are much bigger in number. Usually, it turns out to be a neverending collection of listeners’ greetings for aunts or uncles – which is extremely important for some thirty people shaking with emotion, but for the people next to the radio sets – they feel like puking." Nevertheless, starting from 25 August 1995 in Gdańsk, The Charts has visited many cities and towns all over Poland, the most popular being Szklarska Poręba, the winter capital of Polish Radio Three.

The whole set of The Charts outside the studio, hosted by Marek Niedźwiecki (time, place, Charts’ number):

- 25 August 1995 – Gdańsk (708)
- 15 June 2001 – Szklarska Poręba (1011).
- 14 September 2001 – Szklarska Poręba (1024)
- 7 December 2001 – Szklarska Poręba (1036)
- 3 May 2002 – Szklarska Poręba (1057, 20 Years’ Top)
- 5 July 2002 – Szklarska Poręba (1066)
- 12 July 2002 – Augustów (1067)
- 19 July 2002 – Władysławowo (1068)
- 4 July 2003 – Szklarska Poręba (1118)
- 1 August 2003 – Augustów (1122)
- 15 August 2003 – Sopot (1124)
- 11 June 2004 – Szklarska Poręba (1167)
- 16 July 2004 – Augustów (1172)
- 4 March 2005 – Szklarska Poręba (1205, the summary countdown of previous 1200 countdowns)
- 15 July 2005 – Szklarska Poręba (1224)
- 22 July 2005 – Augustów (1225)
- 20 January 2006 – Zakopane (1251, Top of the year 2005)
- 16 June 2006 – Szklarska Poręba (1272)
- 14 July 2006 – Łeba (1276)
- 25 August 2006 – Sopot (1282)
- 9 February 2007 – Zakopane (1306)
- 9 March 2007 – Sydney, Australia (1310)
- 25 May 2007 – Legnica (1321)
- 13 July 2007 – Muczne, The Bieszczady Mountains (1328)
- 20 July 2007 – Szklarska Poręba (1329)
- 4 June 2010 – Szklarska Poręba (1479)
- 6 August 2010 – Augustów (1488)
- 18 February 2011 – Szklarska Poręba (1516)
- 15 July 2011 – Augustów (1537)
- 29 July 2011 – Wrocław (1539)
- 2 September 2011 – Gdynia (1544)
- 22 June 2012 – Sopot (1586)
- 20 July 2012 – Wrocław (1590)
- 12 July 2013 – Darłowo (1641)
- 2 August 2013 – Szklarska Poręba (1644)
- 23 August 2013 – Bolesławiec (1647)
- 20 September 2013 – Sopot (1651)
- 6 December 2013 – National Stadium Warsaw, together with Piotr Baron (1662)
- 2 May 2014 – Sopot (1683)
- 13 June 2014 – Brzeziny (1689)
- 11 July 2014 – Darłowo (1693)
- 18 July 2014 – Wałcz (notowanie nr 1694)
- 3 October 2014 – Cracow (1705)
- 13 February 2015 – Szklarska Poręba (1724)
- 17 April 2015 – Wrocław (1733)
- 25 September 2015 – Bydgoszcz (1756)
- 4 December 2015 – Central Railway Station Warsaw (1766)
- 12 February 2016 – Szklarska Poręba (1776)
- 20 May 2016 - Dublin
- 17 February 2017 - Szklarska Poręba
- 16 February 2018 - Szklarska Poręba (1881)
- 24 August 2018 - Gdańsk
- 22 February 2019 - Szklarska Poręba (1934)
- 7 June 2019 - Charlotte's Valley/Ustka (1949)
- 28 June 2019 - Zakopane (1952)
- 9 August 2019 - Stalowa Wola (1958)
- 16 August 2019 - Zamość (1959)
- 30 August 2019 - Kraków (1961), together with Piotr Baron
- 6 September 2019 - Chorzów (1962)
- 11 October 2019 - Polanica Zdrój (1967)
- 21 February 2020 - Szklarska Poręba (1986)

== Marek Niedźwiecki The Traveller & Photographer ==
In his free time Marek Niedźwiecki likes travelling. His most favourite destinations now are Australia and Jizera Mountains, but he also mentions India as the place when he felt "at home". Altogether, the most often visited places are The USA (especially Chicago), France (especially Corsica), The Netherlands and Germany.

Foreign journeys:

- Czechoslovakia, (school trip)
- German Democratic Republic, (school trip)
- The Union of Soviet Socialist Republic, (school trip)
- German Democratic Republic, summer 1973
- Yugoslavia, summer 1974
- Yugoslavia, summer 1975
- Hungary, in the 70s
- The Netherlands, summer 1976
- Italy, August/September 1977
- The Netherlands, autumn 1979
- Bulgaria, September 1982
- Romania, September 1982
- Bulgaria, September 1983
- Czechoslovakia, July 1984
- Bulgaria, September 1984
- India, Malesia, Singapur, Nepal, October/November 1984
- Austria, May/June 1985
- The Union of Soviet Socialist Republics, July/August 1985
- Bulgaria, September 1985
- Germany, January 1986
- Thailand, Malesia, Singapur, India, January - March 1986
- The UK, August 1986
- Bulgaria, August/September 1986
- Germany, September 1986
- Germany, January 1987
- France, January/February 1987
- The Netherlands, May/June 1987
- The USA, August - October 1987
- France, January 1988
- Czechoslovakia, March 1988
- Austria, May 1988
- The Netherlands, June 1988
- The Union of Soviet Socialist Republics, October/November 1988
- Singapur, Thailand, March/April 1989
- The Netherlands, June 1989
- Belgium, June 1989
- The Union of Soviet Socialist Republics, October 1989
- Greece, October 1989
- Turkey, October 1989
- France, January 1990
- The Union of Soviet Socialist Republics, January 1990
- The Netherlands, June 1990
- Belgium, June 1990
- Bulgaria, August 1990
- The Netherlands, September 1990
- France, January 1991
- The Netherlands, May 1991
- Germany, August 1991
- The Netherlands, September 1991
- Corsica, November 1991
- Corsica, May 1992
- Germany, June 1992
- The USA, June/July 1992
- The USA, December/January 1993
- Corsica, May 1993
- The USA, August 1993
- Denmark, September 1993
- The Netherlands, November 1993
- Germany, November 1993
- France, January 1994
- Corsica, May 1994
- France, June 1994
- France, October 1994
- The USA, December/January 1995
- Australia, January/February 1995
- The UK, April 1995
- Canada, October 1995
- Italy, December 1995
- The Netherlands, 1996
- Australia, December/January 1996
- France, January 1996
- France, February 1996
- The UK, March 1996
- Corsica, May 1996
- The UK, August 1996
- Austria, August 1996
- The USA, September 1996
- Canada, September 1996
- Jamaica, November 1996
- Mexico, April 1997
- The USA, May 1997
- Canada, May 1997
- Monaco, July 1997
- The UK, August/September 1997
- The USA, November 1997
- Austria, November 1997
- Australia, December/January 1998
- Austria, March 1998
- The USA, April 1998
- France, April 1998
- The Netherlands, June 1998
- The USA, August 1998
- The Netherlands, November 1998
- Thailand, November/December 1998
- The USA, August 1999
- Canada, August 1999
- The Netherlands, August 1999
- Kenya, September/October 1999
- The USA, October 1999
- The Netherlands, May 2000
- Canada, June 2000
- The USA, October 2000
- The UK, November 2000
- Australia, December/January 2001
- New Zealand, December/January 2001
- The Netherlands, February 2001
- The Netherlands, July 2001
- The UK, July 2001
- Portugal, October 2001
- Germany, January 2002
- Germany, February 2002
- Canada, February 2002
- The USA, August 2002
- Germany, December 2002
- Australia, December/January 2003
- New Zealand, December/January 2003
- The USA, February 2003
- Corsica, September 2003
- The UK, October 2003
- Corsica, May 2004
- The USA, October 2005
- Australia, December/January 2005
- New Zealand, December/January 2005
- Australia, March 2006
- Australia, February/March 2007
- Australia, October/November 2007
- The USA, August 2008
- The Czech Republic, May 2009
- Australia, July/August 2009
- The Netherlands, November 2009
- The USA, January/February 2010
- The Czech Republic, March 2010
- Italy, March 2010
- Australia, December/January 2011
- Corsica, September 2011
- India, October/November 2011
- Germany, October 2013
- The Czech Republic, October 2013
- Australia, July/August 2014
- Ireland, September 2014
- Belgium, October 2014
- Spain, March 2015
- Croatia, June/July 2016
- Australia, September/November 2016
- The Netherlands, March 2017
- Spain, March 2017
- USA, September/October 2017
- Spain, March 2018
- USA, August 2018
- Corsica, September 2018
- The Netherlands, June 2019 (The Eagles concert)
- London, UK, July 2019 (Barbra Streisand concert)
- Barcelona, Spain, October/November 2019

=== Australia ===
"My Australia started in a way from the fact that in 1964, a family from Szadek was emigrating to Australia. It was a big event in my little town, someone going there for ever." says Marek Niedźwiecki. He also mentions the film "Wife for the Australian" with Elżbieta Czyżewska and Wiesław Gołas and friendship with Lucia Mlodzianowsky (who was his pen friend while he was a student and who used to send him records with Australian music) as the reasons for his love for Australia.

When asked about his favourite places in Australia, Marek Niedźwiecki usually says that it changes slightly with every journey. In 2008 he created his own Australia Top Ten, which included: Uluru, Kata Tjuta, Tasmania, The Pinnacles Desert, Fraser Island, Twelve Apostles Marine National Park on Great Ocean Road, Sydney, Melbourne, Blue Mountains, Lucky Bay, Great Ocean Drive and Wave Rock. A few years later the list changed only in one position: Wave Rock was replaced by Kimberley, which now Marek Niedźwiecki mentions just after Uluru.

His first journey to Australia took place in January 1995. He was invited by four local Polish radio stations (in Adelaide, Perth, Sydney, Melbourne) for four weeks and he was supposed to be a DJ there, which turned out to be rather meetings with the Poles living there. Marek Niedźwiecki made many friends and came back Down Under twelve times so far, as a turist. He usually spends there four to six weeks, since he claims it's not worth coming for a shorter period of time because of the distance between Poland and Australia and the discomforts of travelling.

From every journey Marek Niedźwiecki brings many photos which he publishes on his blog http://www.marekniedzwiecki.pl/ . Since 11 March 2009 a collection of his photographs has been travelling through Poland. Organized by Muzeum Ziemi Lubuskiej, the exhibition consists of 50 photos, chosen by the museum staff from the 200 suggested by the author. The exhibition was presented in numerous Polish cities such as Zielona Góra, Bydgoszcz, Kutno, Turek, Rybnik, Radomsko, Koszalin, Nekla or Inowrocław.

=== Szklarska Poręba ===
Marek Niedźwiecki says that he has left part of his heart in Jizera Mountains. He usually stays in Szklarska Poręba: "I fell in love with her around the same time I fell in love with Australia [...]. It was the second half of the 90s. I started going there on business. Szklarska became the summer and winter capital of Polish Radio Three. And then I was lost. Like it happens in love. […] I have my favourite places, walks, routes… I can do it many times and it is never boring. […] My house will be there, because it is already my place."

Walking in Karkonosze Mountains and Jizera Mountains Marek Niedźwiecki also takes a lot of photos which he then shows on his blog. In February 2015 in Szklarska Poręba he opened his exhibition of mountain photos called "Dream Mountains". On 7 January 2013 he was awarded the statuette of Rübezahl (Polish: Liczyrzepa, Karkonosz) who is a folklore mountain spirit of Karkonosze Mountains. "How is this possible? It's the prize for love, the joy of being there and the pleasure of talking and writing about Szklarska Poręba, Jakuszyce, The Jizera Mountains. I feel appreciated."

== Records, Films, Books, Blog ==
Apart from being a radio freak and a traveller, Marek Niedźwiecki puts together thematic song collections, is a writer and occasionally appears in films.

=== Records ===
Collections:

- 18 records: Lista Przebojów Programu III 1982–1998 (1998–2001)
- 19 records: Marek Niedźwiecki zaprasza do... Smooth Jazz Cafe 1–19 (1999–2019) & Marek Niedźwiecki przedstawia – The Best of Smooth Jazz Cafe (2008)
- 25 records: 25 lat Listy Przebojów Trójki 1982–2006 (2006–2007)
- 5 records: Złota Trójka 1982–2006 (2007)
- 13 records: 30 lat Listy Przebojów Trójki 2007–2011 (2012)
- 6 records: Muzyka ciszy (2013- 2019)

Single projects:

- 5-ka Listy Przebojów Trójki (1987)
- Top Rock - przeboje Trójki (1990)
- Moja lista marzeń (1992)
- Chillout Cafe (2004)
- Piosenki z dzwoneczkami poleca Marek Niedźwiecki (2007)
- Marek Niedźwiecki prezentuje – Smooth Festival "Złote Przeboje" Bydgoszcz 2009 (2009)
- Perły z Listy Przebojów Programu Trzeciego (2012)
- Moja lista marzeń 2 (2012)
- Radio California (1 July 2016)
- "Marek i Marek Niedźwiecki Sierocki" (19 October 2018)

=== Films ===
- Historia polskiego rocka (2008, documentary, directed by Leszek Gnoiński, Wojciech Słota)
- Beats of Freedom – Zew wolności (2009, documentary, directed by Leszek Gnoiński, Wojciech Słota)
- Listy do M. (2011)
- Ostatnia rodzina (2016)

=== Books ===
- Lista Przebojów Programu Trzeciego: 1982–1994 (Wyd. Wacław Bagiński, Wrocław 1996, ISBN 83-86237-75-9)
- Lista Przebojów Trójki 1994–2006 (Prószyński i S-ka, Warszawa 2007, ISBN 978-83-7469-498-8)
- Nie wierzę w życie pozaradiowe (Agora, Warszawa 2011, ISBN 978-83-268-0642-1)
- Radiota czyli skąd się biorą Niedźwiedzie (Wielka Litera, Warszawa 2014, ISBN 978-83-64142-67-3)
- Australijczyk (Wielka Litera, Warszawa, 4 November 2015, ISBN 9788380320567)
- DyrdyMarki (Wielka Litera, Warszawa, 2 September 2020, ISBN 9788380325227)

=== Blog ===
Marek Niedźwiecki started writing his blog on 14 October 2007 with the assumption that it will be a kind of travel journal (he was just leaving for Australia). "There it is! There it is! There it is! Although I was sure it will never happen. My own blog on the internet is now operational so that I could write this diary-nightery from Down Under." – he began his first post, also mentioning that he will not be writing about himself, which promise, fortunately, he doesn’t keep.

The posts usually appear on Mondays, Thursdays and Saturdays, the latter one including Marek Niedźwiecki's private charts, which he has been writing down since 1975 and since 2008 on the blog.

As for the number of posts, the worst was the month of October 2011 when only 5 posts appeared, the best - November 2007 with 25 posts. Usually, there are about 12 – 13 posts a month.

Almost always there are several photos attached, their number varying from one to 43.

Post number 1000 appeared on 8 December 2014 and was titled "Gdynia w occie".

Photograph number 33333 appeared on 14 March 2016 and was titled "Panie Kierowniku!"

== Useful links ==
- Marek's blog http://www.marekniedzwiecki.pl/
- Official Fanpage http://www.lpmn.pl/
- Polish Radio Three http://www.polskieradio.pl/9,Trojka
- The Charts Archive http://alp3.pl/alpt.phtml
- Facebook https://www.facebook.com/marek.niedzwiecki.169
- Matras Bookshop interview https://www.youtube.com/watch?v=zxokt4k_6Us
- Interview for my3miasto https://www.youtube.com/watch?v=AKgnaGBUzus
- Xięgarnia interview https://www.youtube.com/watch?v=op0IU870MlQ
- Film "The Grey Bear" https://www.youtube.com/watch?v=unTxWjIxigA
- Online interview "Videogaduła" https://www.youtube.com/watch?v=09r2tM3NJVI
- ASP Przystanek Woodstock interview https://www.youtube.com/watch?v=5DfyyD3U51A
