= Lista Przebojów Programu Trzeciego =

Polish music chart

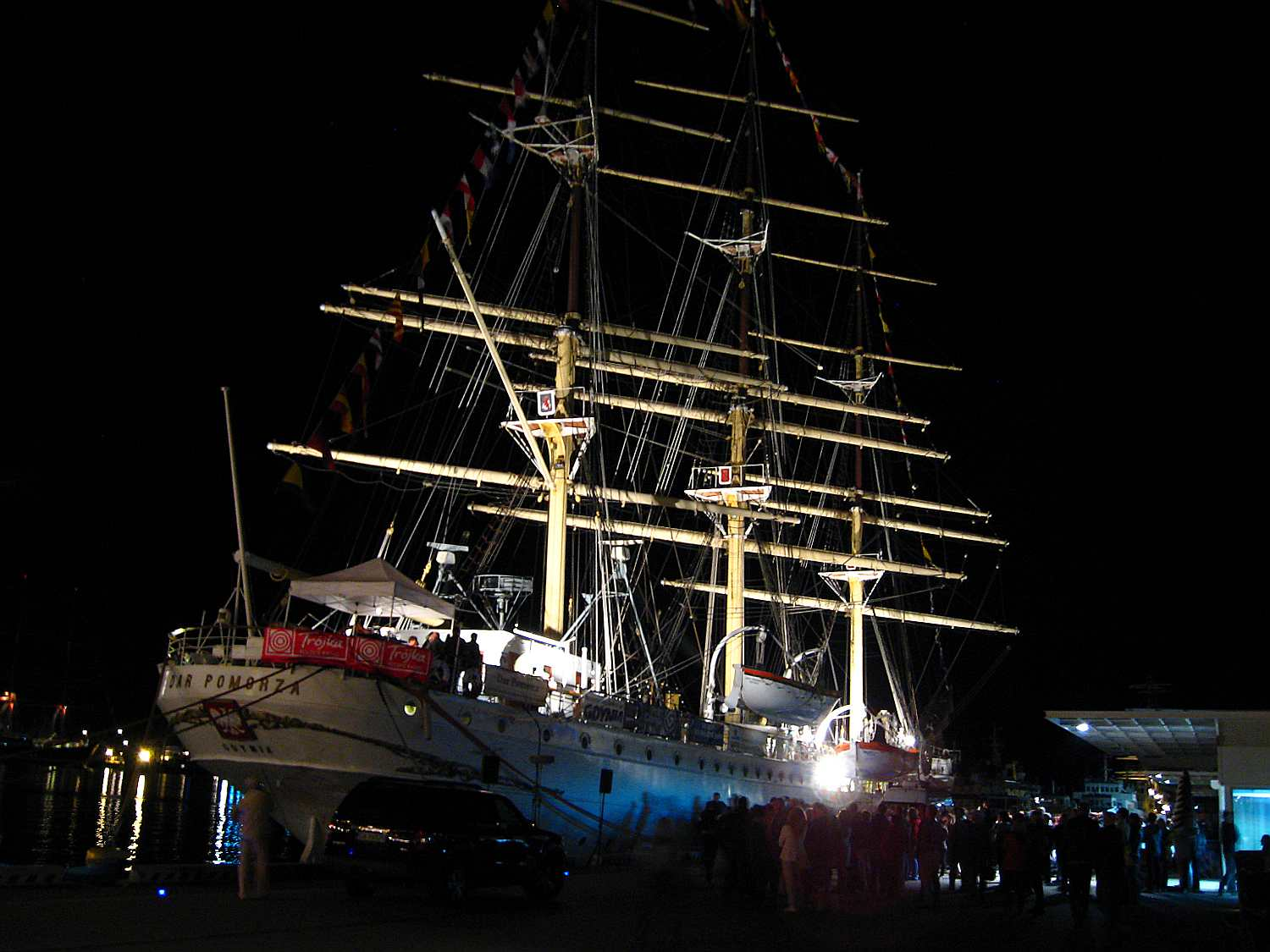
While most LP3 editions are broadcast from the Radio 3 studio in Warsaw, some are broadcast from mobile studios set up in various parts of Poland, such as this 2 September 2011 (list #1544) studio set up aboard Dar Pomorza tall ship.

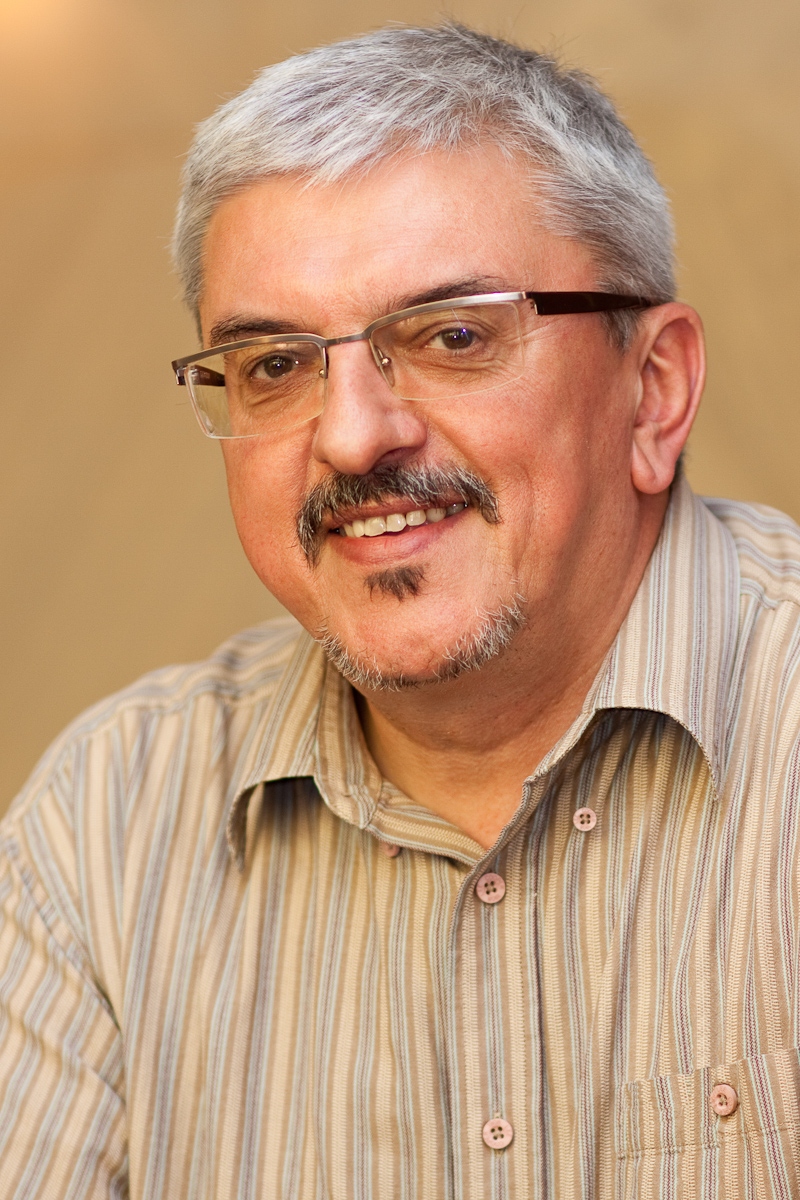
Marek Niedźwiecki, the long-term host of LP3

Lista Przebojów Programu Trzeciego (the Radio Three Chart, LP3) is the oldest and the longest-running music chart in Poland. Aired by Polskie Radio Program III, a division of the Polskie Radio public broadcaster, the list has been broadcast weekly since 24 April 1982 until 15 May 2020 after 1998 airings. Initially hosted by Marek Niedźwiecki, since 2010 the hosting duties have been alternated by Niedźwiecki and Piotr Baron.

== History ==
Although Poland in the 1970s and 1980s had been deeply behind the Iron Curtain, its music scene was far from closed to outside influence. Foreign music arrived in Poland through a variety of channels, including the direct import of records by people who were permitted to cross the borders and through foreign radio stations available in Poland (such as Radio Luxemburg and the Polish section of the Radio Free Europe). Moreover, the contemporary Polish copyright laws were more liberal than those in non-Soviet-controlled countries and copyright infringements were usually not penalized. Because of that various western artists gained popularity in Poland regardless of the fact that their records were never officially released in Poland or even approved by the censorship office.

At that time Radio 3 was one of the few radio stations in Poland airing both foreign music and Polish music not officially supported by the authorities. The latter category included domestic rock artists, electronic music, sung poetry and many other genres looked down upon by the authorities. Because of that Radio 3 gained wide popularity, especially among the younger generations of Poles.

The first list was compiled and aired by Marek Niedźwiecki on 24 April 1982, with the top three songs being "I'll Find My Way Home" by Jon and Vangelis, "O! Nie rób tyle hałasu" by Maanam and "For Those About to Rock (We Salute You)" by AC/DC. Since then the list has been compiled and aired weekly, initially on Saturdays between 20:00 and 22:00. Since September 1989 (list #395) the list was extended to four hours (18:00–22:00). A year later (list #475) it was moved to the Friday 19:00–22:00 slot. Between 2007 and 2010 it was briefly moved back to Saturday evenings, only to be returned to the previous Friday evening slots in April 2010.

Every person is allowed to vote for up to ten songs. Initially (until April 1996) the votes had to be mailed to the radio station for compiling or the audience had to call the station and dictate the names of the songs. Since then voting by Internet (initially a BBS site, then a www site) is the main means of voting.

Since the late 1980s every weekly broadcast is accompanied by a short correspondence from the Netherlands (by Alina Dragan) and the United States (Wojciech Żórniak, Voice of America), with reports on the latest European Hot 100 Singles, Dutch Top 40 and the Top 10 of the Billboard Hot 100.

The chart gained a large fan following, with a busy internet forum and fan-made Internet Archive of the List of Hits, presenting all charts so far, with all songs and their respective places. On 11 November 2010, the fans of Radio Three chose the chart as the most popular Radio Three programme in its history.

== Voting ==
Initially, one vote for a Polish-language song and one for a foreign one were permitted, but soon the limit was extended and now every voter can choose up to ten songs in no particular order. The eligible songs are those that were aired by Radio 3 at least once.

The list, variously compiled into a Top 20, 30, 40 or 50, is divided into two parts. The lower, for ranks between 31 and 50 (As of 2013), are called the waiting room (Polish: poczekalnia). Songs in the waiting room are traditionally not aired in full and are often only mentioned by their title and the chart rank during the weekly broadcast. The top 30 songs have more chances of being aired in full.
